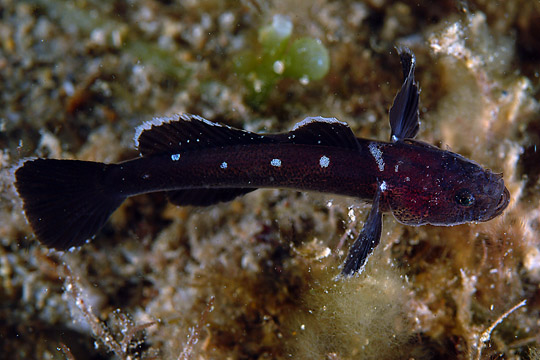
- Didogobius schlieweni

Scientific classification
- Kingdom: Animalia
- Phylum: Chordata
- Class: Actinopterygii
- Division: Teleostei
- Order: Gobiiformes
- Family: Gobiidae
- Subfamily: Gobiinae; G. Cuvier, 1816

= Gobiinae =

Subfamily of fishes

True gobies were a subfamily, the Gobiinae, of the goby family Gobiidae, although the 5th edition of the Fishes of the World does not subdivide the Gobiidae into subfamilies. They are found in all oceans and a few rivers and lakes, but most live in warm waters. Altogether, the Gobiinae unite about 1149 described species in 160 genera, and new ones are still being discovered in numbers.

== Description and ecology ==
They are usually mid-sized to small ray-finned fishes; some are very colorful, while others are cryptic. Most true gobies are less than 10 cm (3.9 in) long when fully grown. The largest species Glossogobius giuris can reach up to 50 cm (20 in); the smallest known species as of 2010, Trimmatom nanus, is just about 1 cm (0.39 in) in length when fully grown, making it one of the smallest vertebrates.

In many true gobies, the pelvic fins have grown together into a suction cup they can use to hold on to substrate. Most have two dorsal fins, the first made up from spiny fin rays, while the other has some spines in the front followed by numerous soft rays.

They are most plentiful in the tropical and subtropical regions, but as a group are almost cosmopolitan in marine ecosystems. A few species tolerate brackish water, and some – Padogobius and Pomatoschistus species – even inhabit fresh water. They are generally benthic as adults (the spawn can distribute widely by ocean currents), only Sufflogobius bibarbatus is noted to be quite pelagic throughout its life. Most inhabit some sort of burrow or crevice and are somewhat territorial. In some cases, they live in symbioses with unrelated animals, such as crustaceans.

The larger species are fished for food, in some cases on a commercial scale. Many Gobiinae species are popular aquarium fish. Especially popular are the colorful species, some of which are regularly traded. In general, the interesting behavior and bold habits make most true gobies seem attractive pets. However, their territoriality and because even the smallest species are fundamentally carnivorous and need living food to thrive make them not easy to keep (particularly compared to the related family Eleotridae). As typical for oceanic fishes, many Gobiinae tend to be almost impossible to breed in captivity, and some species have become rare from habitat destruction and overfishing.

== Genera ==
This subfamily contains 152 genera and 1332 species:

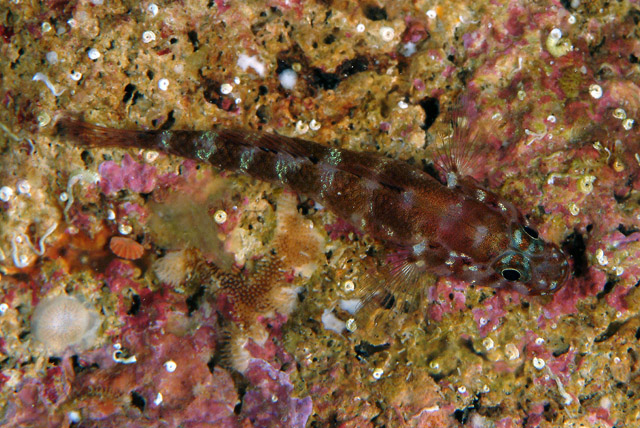
Gammogobius steinitzi

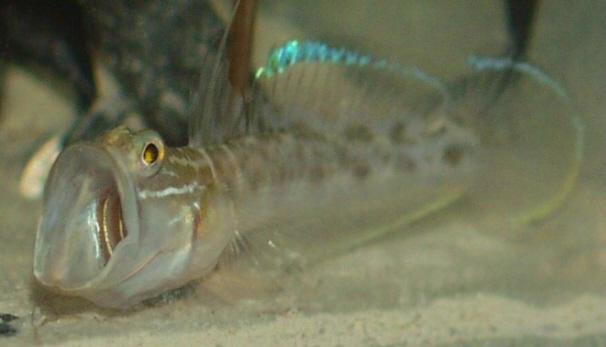
Microgobius gulosus in threatening pose

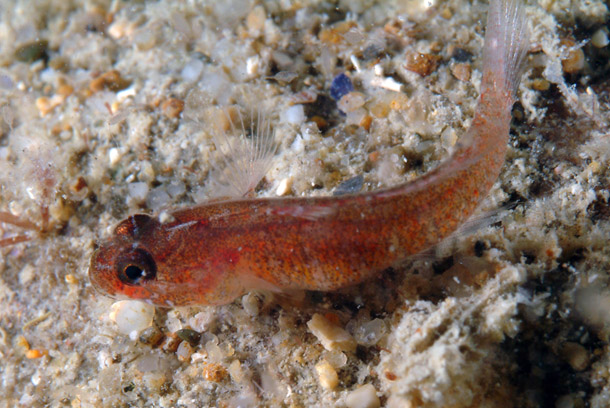
Odondebuenia balearica

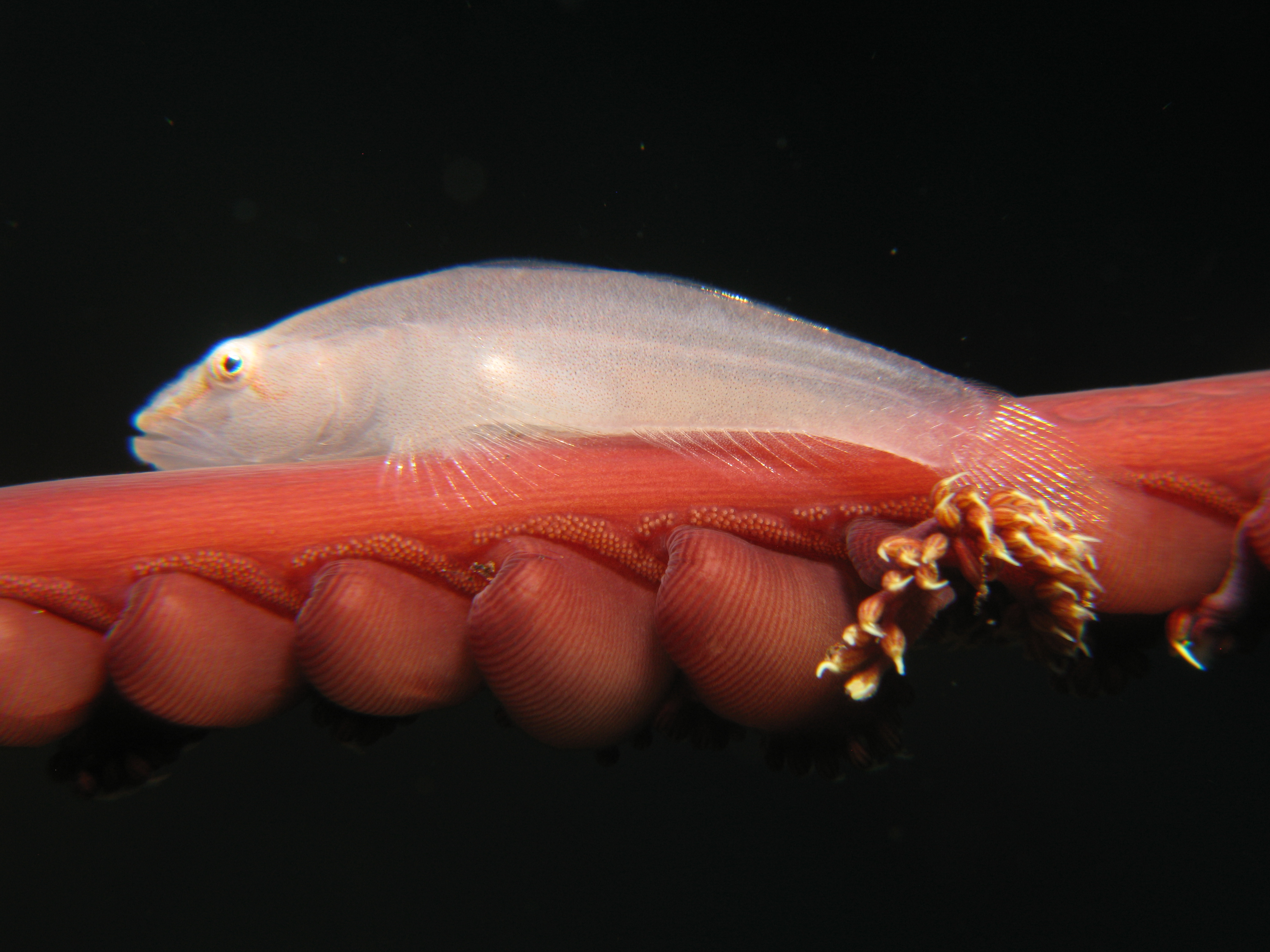
Pleurosicya boldinghi on a sea pen

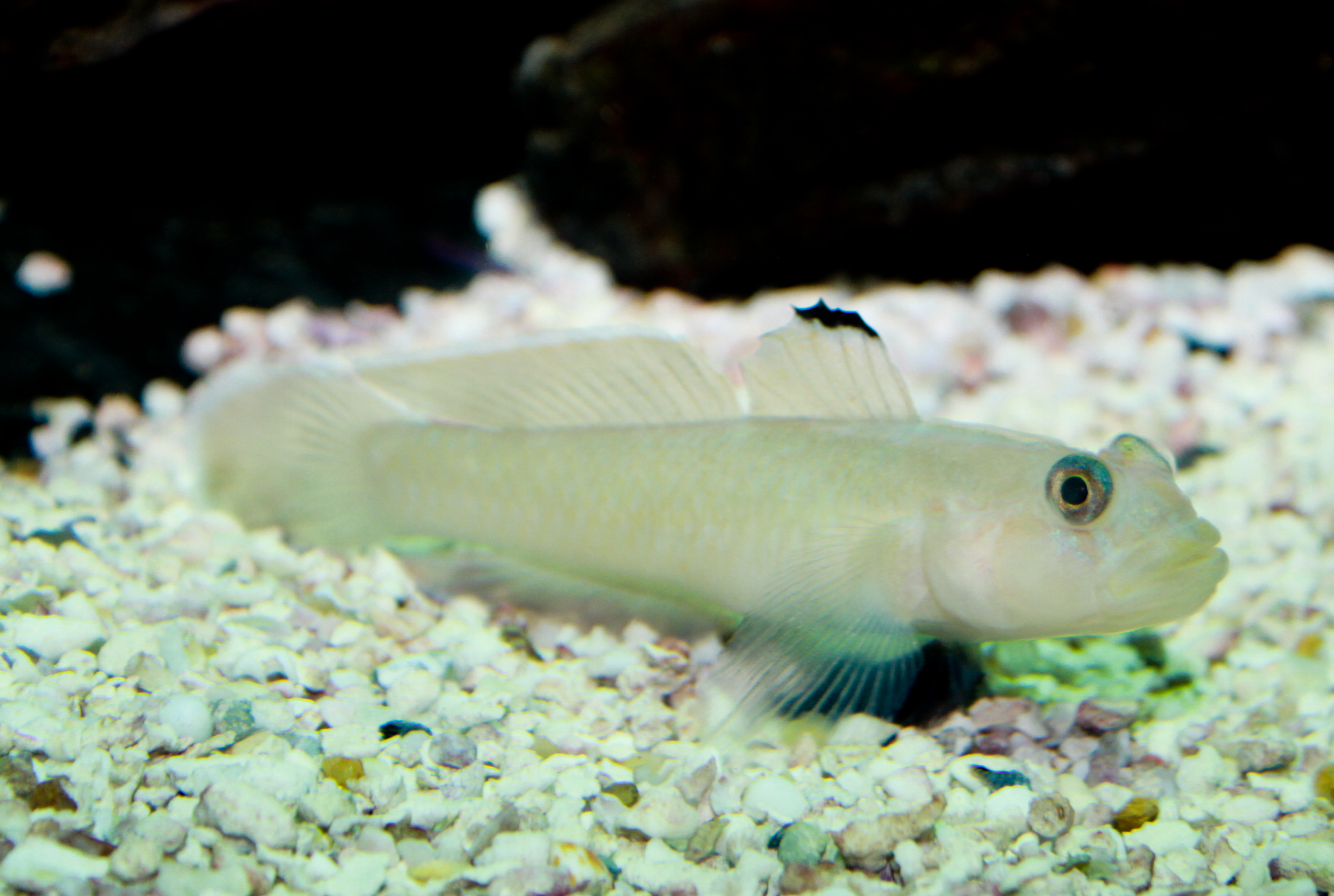
Rhinogobiops nicholsii can change its color, but the black dorsal fin spot remains the same.

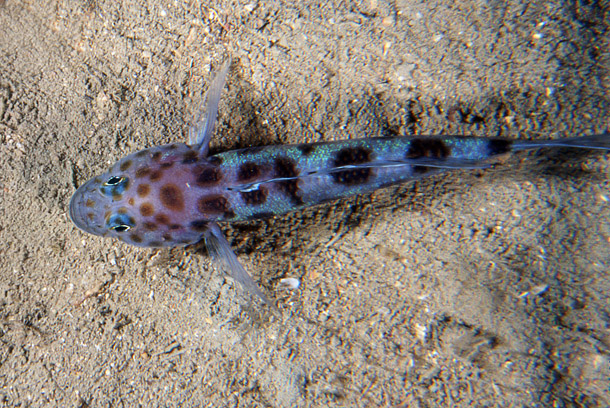
Thorogobius ephippiatus

- Aboma
- Acentrogobius
- Afurcagobius
- Akko
- Amblyeleotris
- Amblygobius
- Anatirostrum
- Ancistrogobius
- Antilligobius
- Aphia
- Arcygobius
- Arenigobius
- Aruma
- Asterropteryx
- Aulopareia
- Austrolethops
- Babka
- Barbulifer
- Barbuligobius
- Bathygobius
- Benthophiloides
- Benthophilus
- Birdsongichthys
- Bollmannia
- Bryaninops
- Cabillus
- Caffrogobius
- Callogobius
- Caspiosoma
- Cerogobius
- Chriolepis
- Chromogobius
- Corcyrogobius
- Coryogalops
- Coryphopterus
- Cristatogobius
- Croilia
- Cryptocentroides
- Cryptocentrus
- Cryptopsilotris
- Ctenogobiops
- Didogobius
- Discordipinna
- Dotsugobius
- Drombus
- Ebomegobius
- Echinogobius
- Egglestonichthys
- Elacatinus
- Eleotrica
- Evermannia
- Eviota
- Exyrias
- Favonigobius
- Feia
- Fusigobius
- Gammogobius
- Ginsburgellus
- Gladiogobius
- Glossogobius
- Gobiodon
- Gobiopsis
- Gobiosoma
- Gobius
- Gobulus
- Gorogobius
- Grallenia
- Gymneleotris
- Gymnesigobius
- Hazeus
- Hetereleotris
- Heterogobius
- Heteroplopomus
- Istigobius
- Kelloggella
- Koumansetta
- Larsonella
- Lesueurigobius
- Lobulogobius
- Lophogobius
- Lotilia
- Lubricogobius
- Luposicya
- Lythrypnus
- Macrodontogobius
- Mahidolia
- Mangarinus
- Marcelogobius
- Mauligobius
- Mesogobius
- Microgobius
- Millerigobius
- Minysicya
- Mizogobius
- Myersina
- Nematogobius
- Neogobius
- Nes
- Obliquogobius
- Odondebuenia
- Ophiogobius
- Oplopomops
- Oplopomus
- Padogobius
- Paedovaricus
- Palatogobius
- Palutrus
- Parachaeturichthys
- Paragobiodon
- Paratrimma
- Pariah
- Parkraemeria
- Parrella
- Pascua
- Peter
- Phoxacromion
- Phyllogobius
- Pinnichthys
- Platygobiopsis
- Pleurosicya
- Ponticola
- Porogobius
- Priolepis
- Proterorhinus
- Psammogobius
- Psilogobius
- Psilotris
- Rhinogobiops
- Risor
- Robinsichthys
- Schindleria
- Signigobius
- Silhouettea
- Stonogobiops
- Sueviota
- Sufflogobius
- Thorogobius
- Tigrigobius
- Tomiyamichthys
- Trimma
- Trimmatom
- Tryssogobius
- Valenciennea
- Vanderhorstia
- Vanneaugobius
- Varicus
- Vomerogobius
- Wheelerigobius
- Yoga
- Yongeichthys
- Zebrus
- Zosterisessor

The following fossil genera are also known:

- †Hesperichthys Schwarzhans, Ahnelt, Carnevale & Japundžić, 2016
- †Proneogobius Schwarzhans, Ahnelt, Carnevale & Japundžić, 2016
