= Pinnichthys =

Scientific classification
- Kingdom: Animalia
- Phylum: Chordata
- Class: Actinopterygii
- Order: Gobiiformes
- Family: Gobiidae
- Subfamily: Gobiinae
- Genus: Pinnichthys; Van Tassell, Tornabene & Gilmore, 2016

Type species
- Pinnichthys aimoriensis Van Tassell & Tornabene 2016

Genus of fishes

Pinnichthys is a genus of ray-finned fish from the family Gobiidae. They are found in the western Atlantic and the eastern Pacific, the genus was named in 2016. Three species previously classified in the genus Chriolepis have been included in Pinnichthys.

== Species ==
Five species have been assigned to this genus:

- Pinnichthys aimoriensis Van Tassell & Tornabene, 2016 (Thiony's goby)
- Pinnichthys atrimelum (Bussing, 1997) (Black-cheek goby)
- Pinnichthys bilix (Hastings & Findley, 2013) (Double-filament goby)
- Pinnichthys prolata (Hastings & Findley, 2015) (Platform goby)
- Pinnichthys saurimimica Gilmore, Van Tassell & Tornabene, 2016 (Lizardfish goby)
