= FEIA =

FEIA may refer to:

- Feia, a genus of gobies
- Fluorescent enzyme immunoassay, a blood test to diagnose allergies
