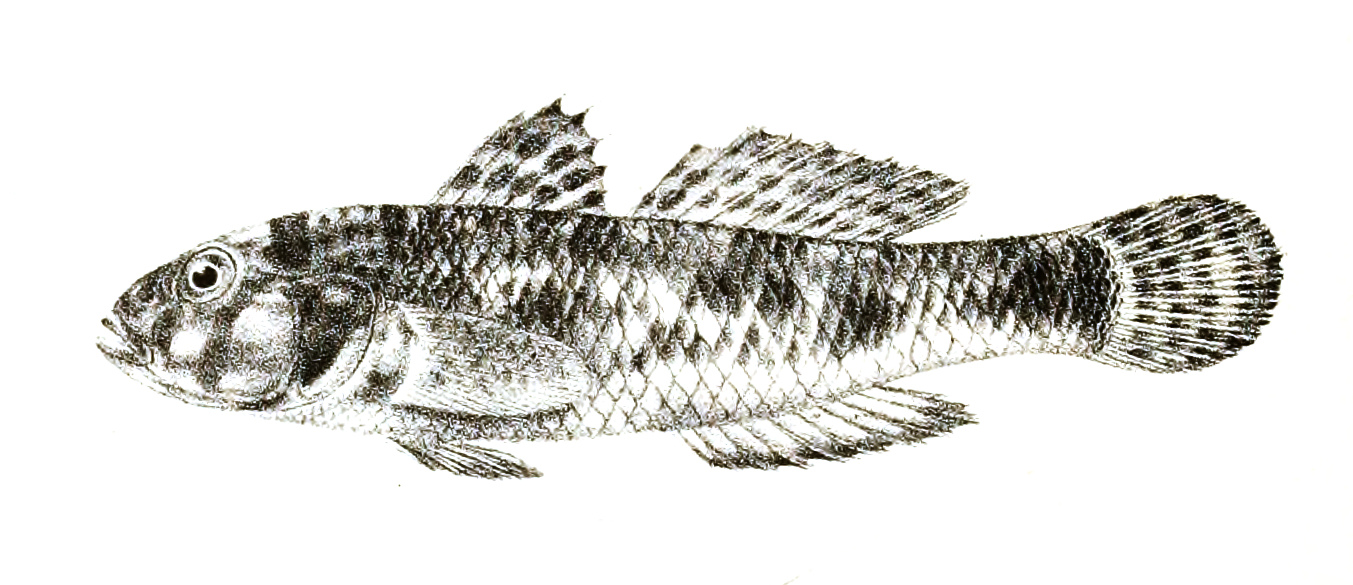
- Yongeichthys criniger

Scientific classification
- Kingdom: Animalia
- Phylum: Chordata
- Class: Actinopterygii
- Order: Gobiiformes
- Family: Gobiidae
- Subfamily: Gobiinae
- Genus: Yongeichthys; Whitley, 1932

Type species
- Gobius criniger Valenciennes, 1837

= Yongeichthys =

Genus of fishes

Yongeichthys is a genus of gobies native to the coastal waters of the Atlantic coast of Africa, Indian Ocean and the western Pacific Ocean. The name of this genus honours the zoologist Charles Maurice Yonge (1899-1986), who led the Great Barrier Reef Expedition of 1928–1929.

== Species ==
There are currently seven recognized species in this genus:

- Yongeichthys audax (Smith, 1959)
- Yongeichthys nebulosus (Forsskål, 1775)
- Yongeichthys signatus (Peters, 1855)
- Yongeichthys suluensis (Herre, 1927)
- Yongeichthys thomasi (Boulenger, 1916)
- Yongeichthys tuticorinensis (Fowler, 1925)
- Yongeichthys viganensis (Steindachner, 1893)
