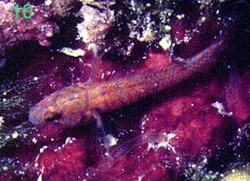
- Corcyrogobius liechtensteini

Scientific classification
- Kingdom: Animalia
- Phylum: Chordata
- Class: Actinopterygii
- Order: Gobiiformes
- Family: Gobiidae
- Subfamily: Gobiinae
- Genus: Corcyrogobius; P. J. Miller, 1972

Type species
- Gobius liechtensteini Kolombatović, 1891

= Corcyrogobius =

Genus of fishes

Corcyrogobius is a genus of gobies native to the eastern Atlantic Ocean and the Mediterranean Sea.

== Species ==
There are currently three recognized species in this genus:

- Corcyrogobius liechtensteini (Kolombatović, 1891) (Liechtenstein's goby)
- Corcyrogobius lubbocki P. J. Miller, 1988
- Corcyrogobius pulcher Kovačić et al., 2020

== Discovery and naming ==
The first species of the genus Corcyrogobius was first described by the Croatian zoologist Juraj Kolombatović in 1891, based on twelve specimen he collected off the coast of Korčula, an adriatic island now belonging to Croatia. He first described this new species as Gobius liechtensteini. In 1972, Peter J. Miller, a British ichthyologist, recognized four of the original twelve specimen, which Kolombatović had supposed to be juvenile stages of the species lifecycle, to actually belong to a different species, Odondebuenia balearica. Miller redescribed the species, based on the remaining eight specimen, under the name Corcyrogobius liechtensteini, meaning "Liechtenstein's goby from Korčula".

In 1988, the very same Peter J. Miller discovered two older samples of gobiids collected for the British Museum of Natural History off the coast of Annobon, Equatorial Guinea, in 1927, to belong to the same genus of Corcyrogobius. Matching the traits with specimen collected in 1976 in Prampram, Ghana, he described another species: Corcyrogobius lubbocki, meaning Lubbock's goby from Korčula.

Lastly, in 2020, an ichthyological expedition to the Île de Ngor off the coast of Senegal recovered two specimen of another Corcyrogobius species. Corcyrogobius pulcher, meaning "Beautiful goby from Korčula", was genetically analysed and placed in the genus' phylogenetic tree as the outgroup to the more closely related species C. lubbocki and C. liechtensteini.
