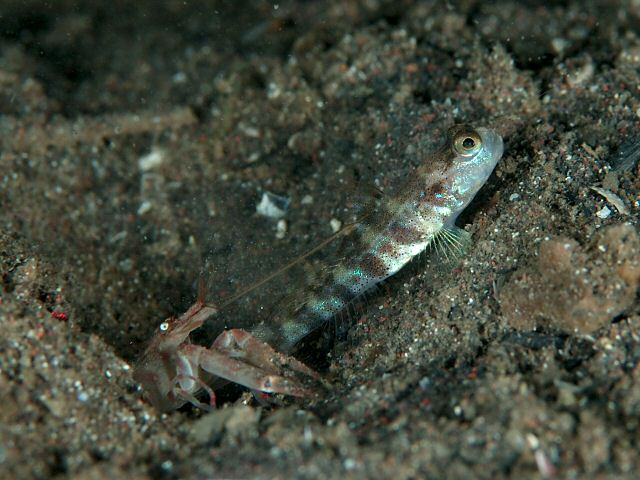
- Myersina filifer

Scientific classification
- Kingdom: Animalia
- Phylum: Chordata
- Class: Actinopterygii
- Order: Gobiiformes
- Family: Gobiidae
- Subfamily: Gobiinae
- Genus: Myersina; Herre, 1934

Type species
- Myersina macrostoma Herre, 1934

Synonyms
- Paragobius Bleeker, 1872

= Myersina =

Genus of fishes

Myersina is a genus of ray-finned fish from the family Gobiidae, the true gobies which are found from the Atlantic coast of South Africa through the Indian Ocean to the western Pacific Ocean. The generic name honours the American ichthyologist George S. Myers (1905-1985) who was a younger colleague of Herre's at the time at which he described the genus and who went on to be president of the American Society of Ichthyologists and Herpetologists, the head of the Division of Fishes at the United States National Museum and an ichthyologist for the United States Fish and Wildlife Service.

== Species ==
There are currently nine recognized species in this genus:

- Myersina adonis Shibukawa & Satapoomin, 2006 (Adonis shrimpgoby)
- Myersina balteata Greenfield & Randall, 2018
- Myersina crocata (Wongratana, 1975) (Yellow-spotted shrimpgoby)
- Myersina filifer (Valenciennes, 1837) (Filamentous shrimpgoby)
- Myersina lachneri Hoese & Lubbock, 1982 (Lachner's shrimpgoby)
- Myersina macrostoma Herre, 1934 (Bigmouth shrimpgoby)
- Myersina nigrivirgata Akihito & Meguro, 1983 (Black-line shrimp-goby)
- Myersina papuana (W. K. H. Peters, 1877)
- Myersina pretoriusi (J. L. B. Smith, 1958) (Pondoland sailfin goby)
- Myersina yangii (T. R. Chen, 1960)
