= Ancistrogobius =

Scientific classification
- Kingdom: Animalia
- Phylum: Chordata
- Class: Actinopterygii
- Order: Gobiiformes
- Family: Gobiidae
- Subfamily: Gobiinae
- Genus: Ancistrogobius; Shibukawa, Yoshino & G. R. Allen, 2010

Type species
- Ancistrogobius dipus Shibukawa, Yoshino & G. R. Allen, 2010

Genus of fishes

Ancistrogobius is a genus of gobies native to the western Pacific Ocean. The first fossil record of this genus is Ancistrogobius indicus (only otoliths known) from the Burdigalian of southwestern India.

== Species ==
There are currently four recognized species in this genus:

- Ancistrogobius dipus Shibukawa, Yoshino & G. R. Allen, 2010 (Double-fin cheek-hook goby)
- Ancistrogobius squamiceps Shibukawa, Yoshino & G. R. Allen, 2010 (Scaly cheek-hook goby)
- Ancistrogobius yanoi Shibukawa, Yoshino & G. R. Allen, 2010 (Yano's cheek-hook goby)
- Ancistrogobius yoshigoui Shibukawa, Yoshino & G. R. Allen, 2010 (Threadless cheek-hook goby)
- †Ancistrogobius indicus Carolin, Bajpai, Maurya & Schwarzhans, 2022 (fossil)
