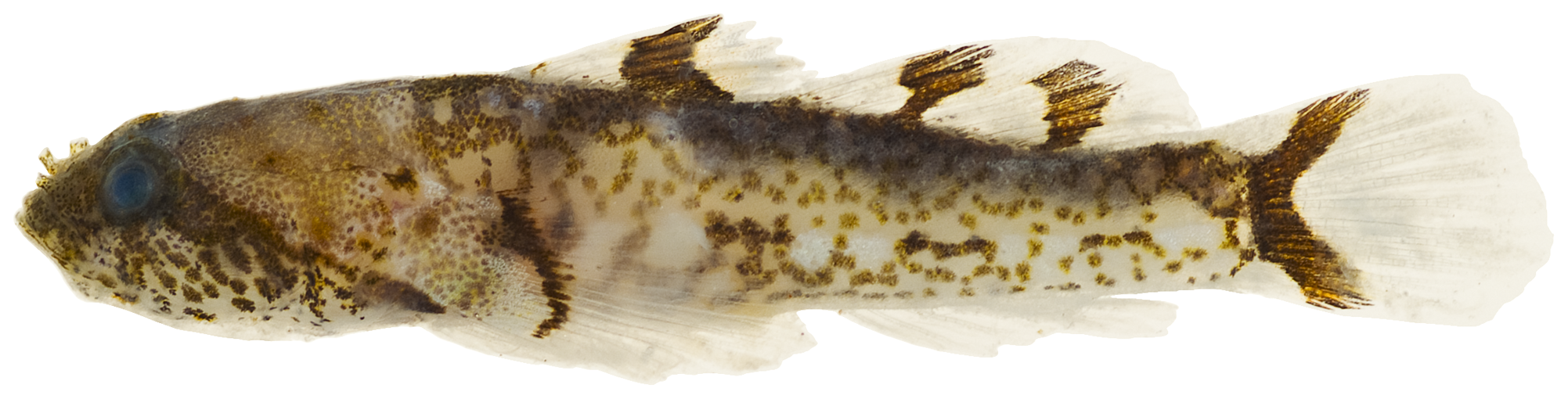

Conservation status
- Least Concern (IUCN 3.1)

Scientific classification
- Kingdom: Animalia
- Phylum: Chordata
- Class: Actinopterygii
- Order: Gobiiformes
- Family: Gobiidae
- Genus: Cryptopsilotris; Tornabene, Van Tassell & Gilmore, 2016
- Species: C. batrachodes

Binomial name
- Cryptopsilotris batrachodes (Böhlke, 1963)

Synonyms
- Psilotris batrachodes Böhlke, 1963

= Toadfish goby =

Species of fish

The toadfish goby (Cryptopsilotris batrachodes) is a species of bony fish in the family Gobiidae which is found in areas of sandy substrates among coral reefs. It occurs in the western Atlantic Ocean from the Bahamas south through the Caribbean Sea as well as along the Central and South American coast from Belize to Santa Marta, Colombia. It is the only species in the monotypic genus Cryptopsilotris, although it was formerly classified under Psilotris and its generic name means "hidden Pilotris", meaning that it was hidden within that genus.
