= Henry E. Nichols =

U.S. Navy officer

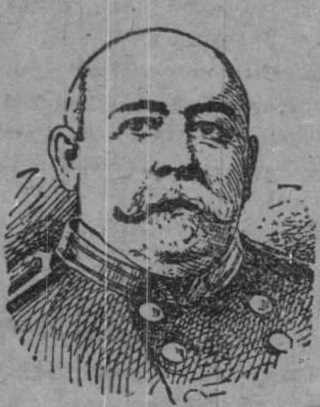
- Darlington Democrat (Darlington, Wisconsin), July 6, 1899
- Born: February 27, 1842; Greene, New York, U.S.
- Died: June 10, 1899 (aged 57); Parañaque, Philippines
- Burial place: Mountain View Cemetery, Oakland, California, U.S.
- Spouse: Juliet Emily Fish (m. 1888–1899, his death)
- Military career
- Allegiance: Union; United States
- Service: Union Navy; United States Navy
- Service years: 1865 (Union); 1865–1899 (United States)
- Rank: Captain
- Commands: USS Pinta; USS Bennington; USS Monadnock
- Wars: American Civil War; Spanish–American War

Henry Ezra Nichols (February 27, 1842 – June 10, 1899) was an American naval officer who served as the commander of the Department of Alaska from September 14, 1884 to September 15, 1884. He was also commander of the USS Pinta.

== Biography ==
Nichols graduated from the US Naval Academy in September 1865, and served in the U.S. Navy for the rest of his life, reaching the rank of captain in March 1899, a few months before his death.

== Legacy ==
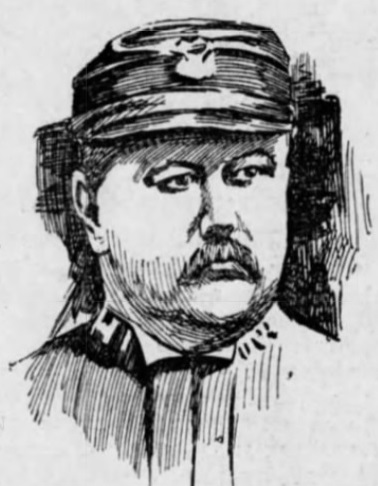
Philadelphia Times, June 12, 1899

Nichols is the namesake for the specific epithet of the blackeye goby (Rhinogobiops nicholsii). He collected the specimen and captained the ship during the voyage.
