= Barbulifer =

Scientific classification
- Kingdom: Animalia
- Phylum: Chordata
- Class: Actinopterygii
- Order: Gobiiformes
- Family: Gobiidae
- Subfamily: Gobiinae
- Genus: Barbulifer; C. H. Eigenmann & R. S. Eigenmann, 1888

Type species
- Barbulifer papillosus as a synonym of Barbulifer ceuthoecus C. H. Eigenmann & R. S. Eigenmann, 1888

Genus of fishes

Barbulifer is a genus of gobies native to the tropical Atlantic coast of the Americas as well as the Gulf of California on the Pacific coast.

== Species ==
There are currently five recognized species in this genus:

- Barbulifer antennatus J. E. Böhlke & C. R. Robins, 1968 (Barbulifer)
- Barbulifer ceuthoecus (D. S. Jordan & C. H. Gilbert, 1884) (Bearded goby)
- Barbulifer enigmaticus Joyeux, Van Tassell & Macieira, 2009 (Goateed goby)
- Barbulifer mexicanus Hoese & Larson, 1985 (Saddlebanded goby)
- Barbulifer pantherinus (Pellegrin, 1901) (Panther goby)
