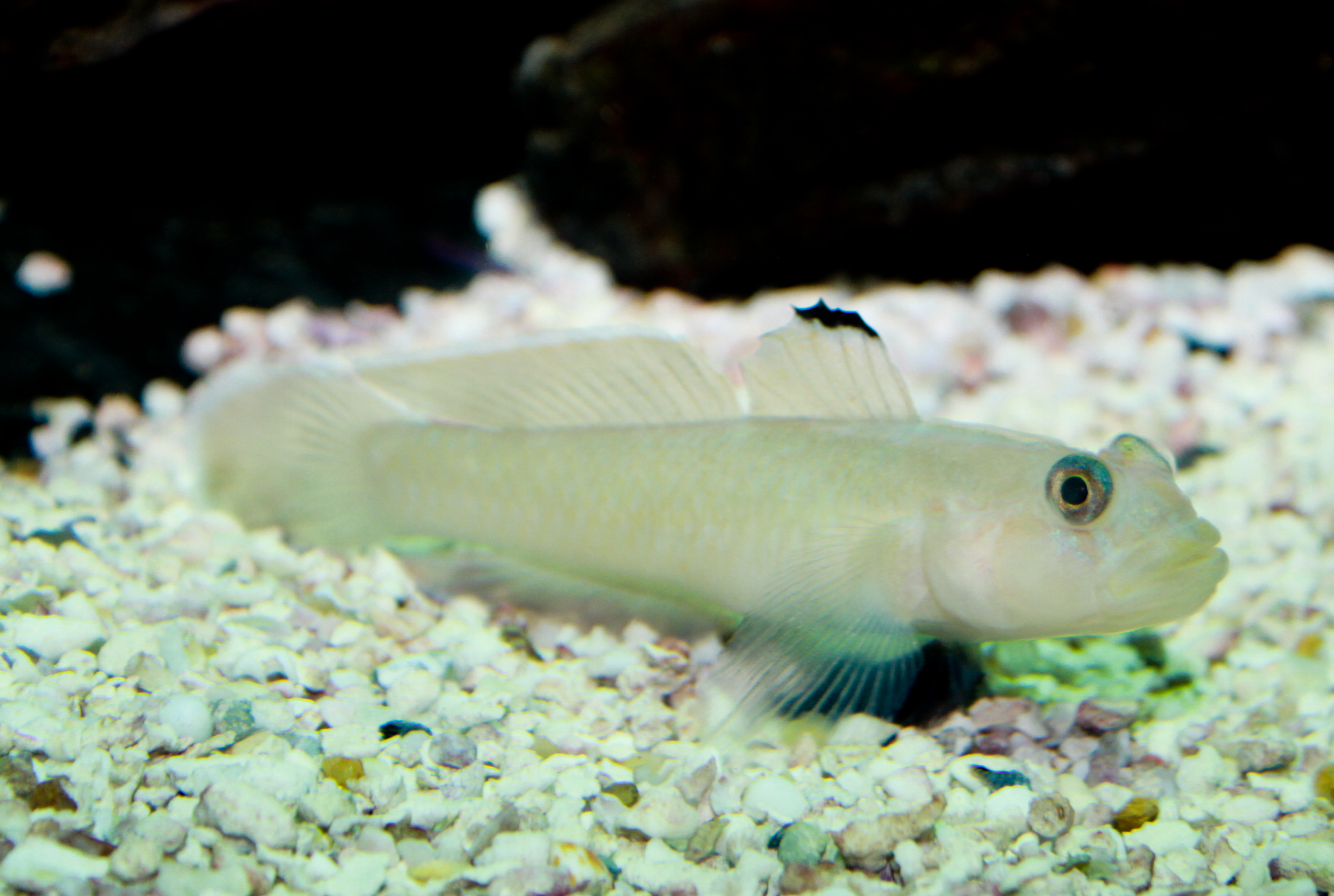

Scientific classification
- Kingdom: Animalia
- Phylum: Chordata
- Class: Actinopterygii
- Division: Teleostei
- Order: Gobiiformes
- Family: Gobiidae
- Subfamily: Gobiinae
- Genus: Rhinogobiops; C. L. Hubbs, 1926
- Species: R. nicholsii

Binomial name
- Rhinogobiops nicholsii (T. H. Bean, 1882)
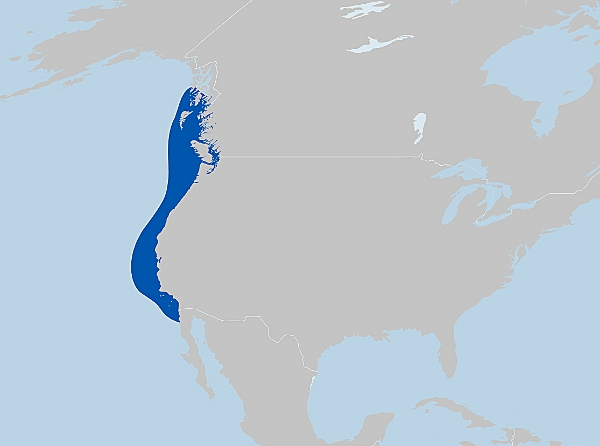
- distribution

Synonyms
- Gobius nicholsii T. H. Bean, 1882; Coryphopterus nicholsii (T. H. Bean, 1882)

= Rhinogobiops =

Rhinogobiops Temporal range: Pliocene to present

Genus of fishes

Rhinogobiops is a genus of true gobies in the family Gobiidae. It is monotypic, being represented by the single species, Rhinogobiops nicholsii, also known as the blackeye goby, bluespot goby, and crested goby. They are common inhabitants of coral reefs and rocky habitats along the eastern Pacific Ocean coasts of Mexico, the United States, and Canada, although they are hardly noticed, as they often rest motionless near their shelters.

Blackeye gobies range in color from creamy white to a mottled dark purple-brown, but can easily be recognized by the distinctive black spot on their first dorsal fins and an iridescent blue spot beneath their eyes. They are capable of rapidly changing their color in response to social situations or threats. They are also protogynous hermaphrodites, starting out in life as females. They are highly territorial and each male usually maintains a harem of two to eight females.

== Taxonomy ==
The blackeye goby is the only species recognised in the genus Rhinogobiops. It is a true goby, being classified in the subfamily Gobiinae.

The species was first described in 1882 by the American ichthyologist Tarleton Hoffman Bean from a specimen from Departure Bay, British Columbia, recovered in 1881 by the American survey vessel Hassler. He named it Gobius nicholsii, after Henry E. Nichols, the collector of the specimen and the captain of the ship.

It was transferred to the genus Rhinogobius in 1907 by Edwin Chapin Starks and Earl Leonard Morris. In 1926, American ichthyologist Carl Leavitt Hubbs moved it to its own genus, Rhinogobiops. The name comes from Greek, meaning "resembling Gobius".

In 1960, James E. Böhlke and C. Richard Robins synonymized Rhinogobiops with the genus Coryphopterus, though they noted that it differed from other members of the latter in the number of fin rays and scales and should be treated as a subgenus. In 1995, John E. Randall expressed doubts as to the validity of this move. He was supported by ichthyologists Ray S. Birdsong and even Robins himself in believing that Rhinogobiops is in fact distinct from Coryphopterus.

This was confirmed in 2002 in a phylogenetic study on the genus Coryphopterus by Christine E. Thacker and Kathleen S. Cole. They concluded that blackeye gobies were more closely related to a clade containing Lophogobius cyprinoides than to the rest of the genus. They transferred it back to the genus Rhinogobiops and it is now valid as Rhinogobiops nicholsii.

=== Fossil record ===
Abundant otolith fossils of blackeye gobies from the Pliocene epoch (5.3 to 3.6 million years ago) have been found in Lomita Marl. Pleistocene fossils of the species have also been recovered from other fossil localities in California.

== Description ==
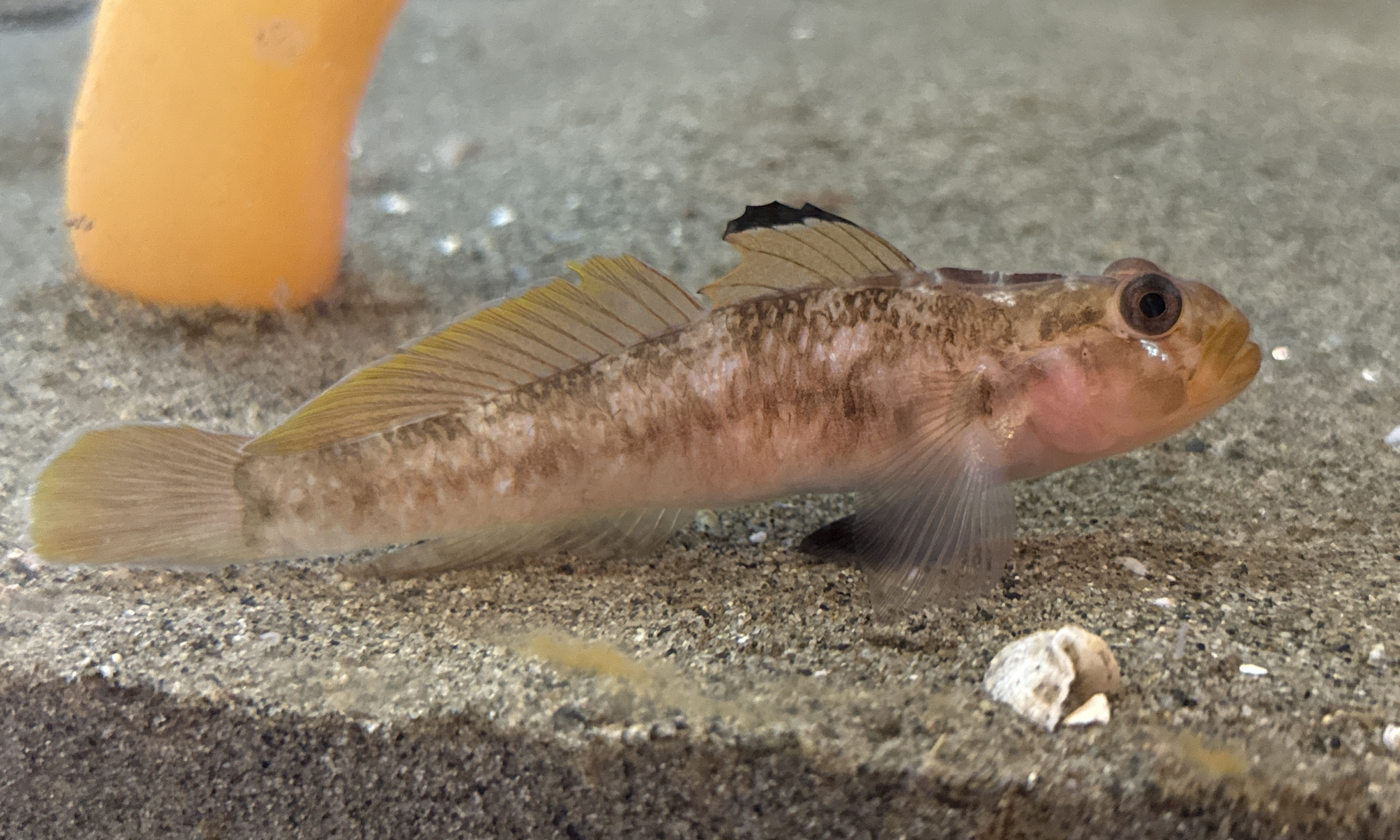
At the Vancouver Aquarium

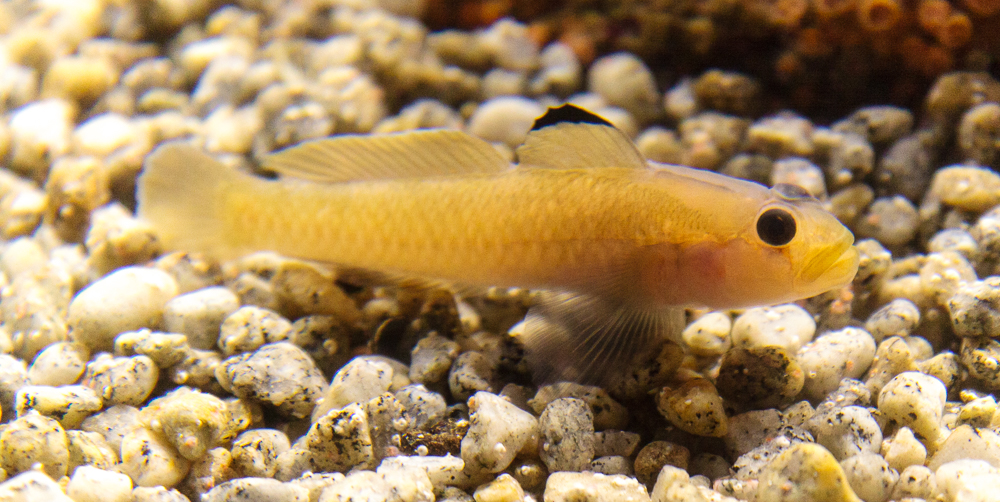
At the Monterey Bay Aquarium

Blackeye gobies can easily be identified by the fleshy crest on the upper surface of their heads, the distinctive black upper anterior edge of the first dorsal fin, their large scales, and large, dark eyes. They are small fish, reaching a maximum length of only 15 cm (6 in). The body is elongated, slightly compressed, and almost completely covered by scales. The head lacks scales and is wider than it is deep, with a small terminal mouth and a projecting lower jaw. The maxilla does not extend below the anterior margin of the eye. The teeth are conical and are present in double rows on both jaws. The eyes are directed slightly upwards and sideways.

The dorsal fins are close together, with the first dorsal fin having five to seven rays and the second having 12 to 15. The pectoral fins have 21 to 24 rays, all of which are rigid. The anal fin has 11 to 14 rays with no spines. It is about the same size as the second dorsal fin. The caudal fin is rounded with about 17 rays, 12 of which are segmented and branched. The pelvic fins are completely fused with each other, forming a disk, each with four rays. These function as suckers.

Coloration can vary, as blackeye gobies are capable of rapidly changing color during social interactions and for camouflage. The basic body color is creamy white to pale tan, but can become a mottled dark purple-brown. The body is irregularly speckled with metallic blue-green. Below the eye is an iridescent bluish spot clearly visible if illuminated (the source of their other common name – bluespot goby). The first dorsal fin has a distinctive black upper anterior edge that is retained even when the fish changes color. During breeding season, the pelvic fins of the males (normally gray in both sexes) turn jet black.

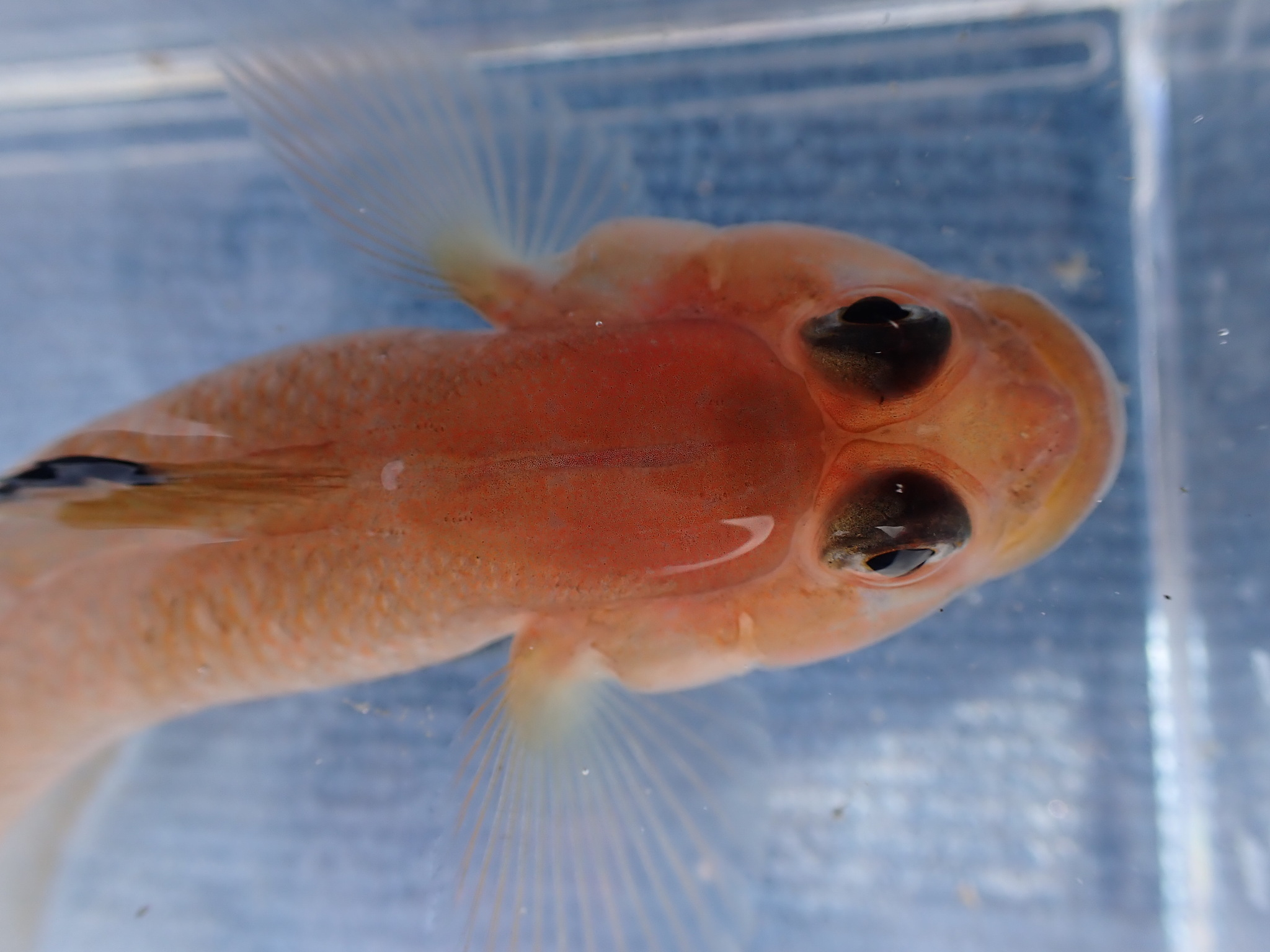
Showing the fleshy crest above the head

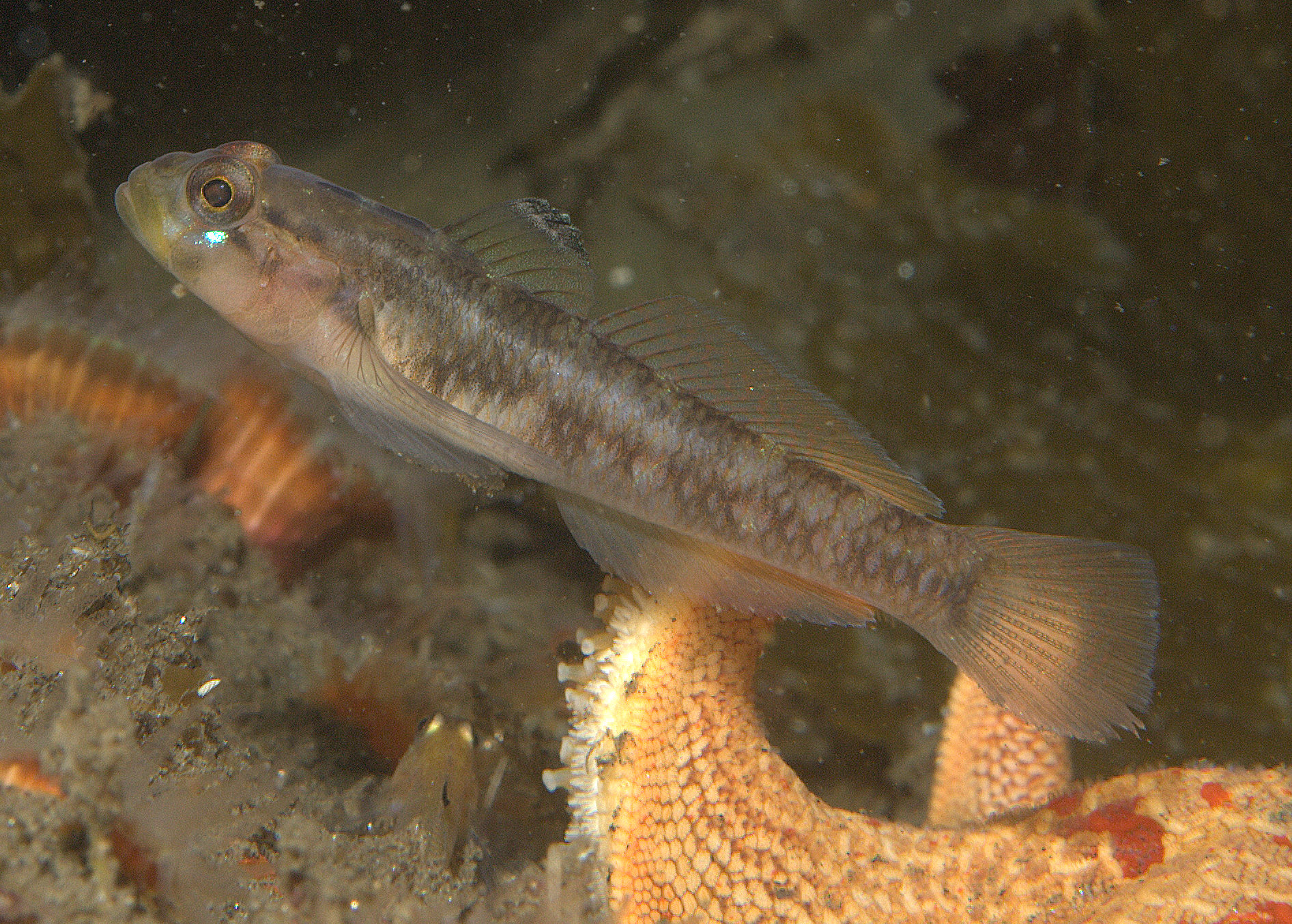
Showing the eponymous iridescent blue spot below the eye

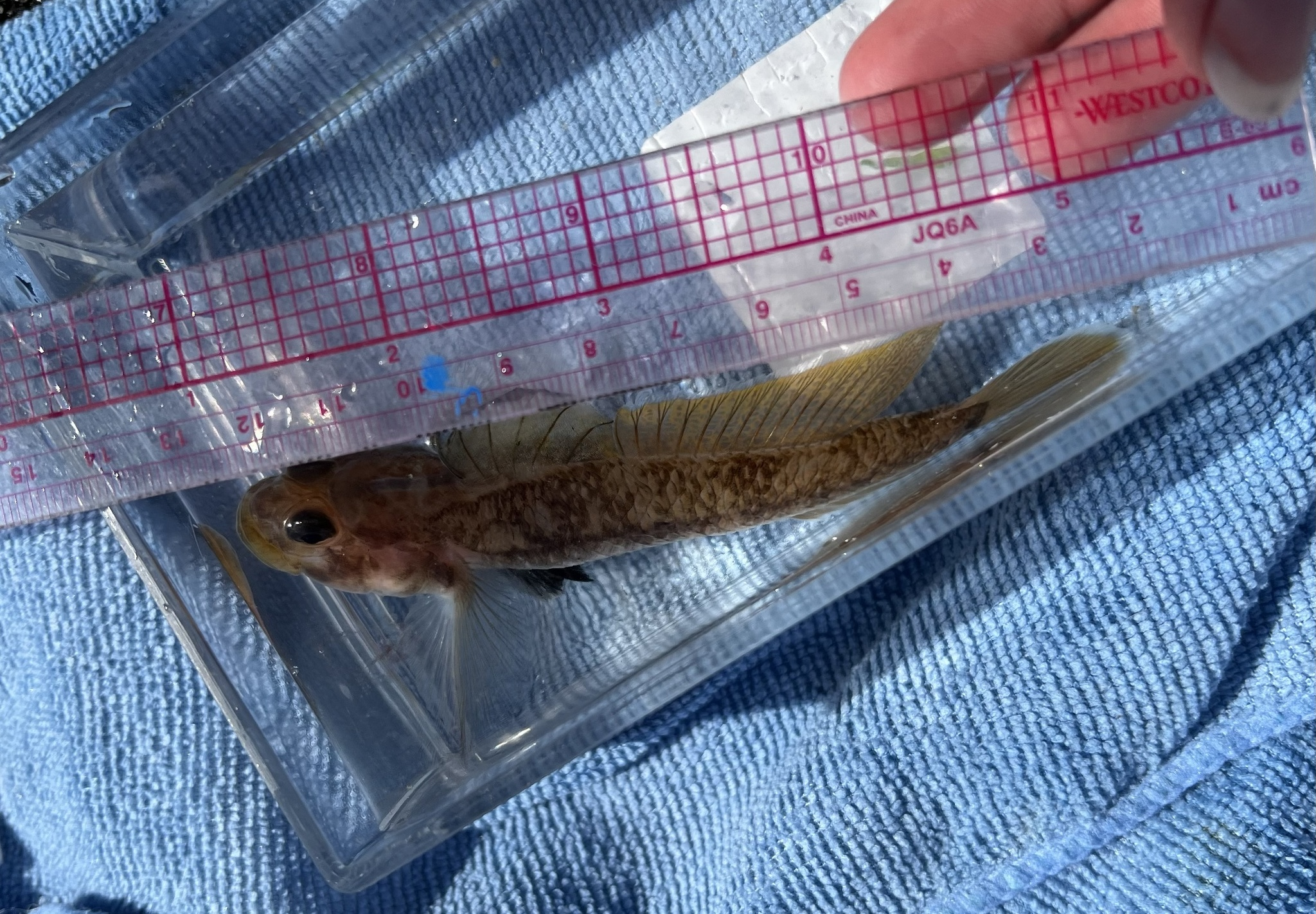
With scale bar

== Distribution and habitat ==
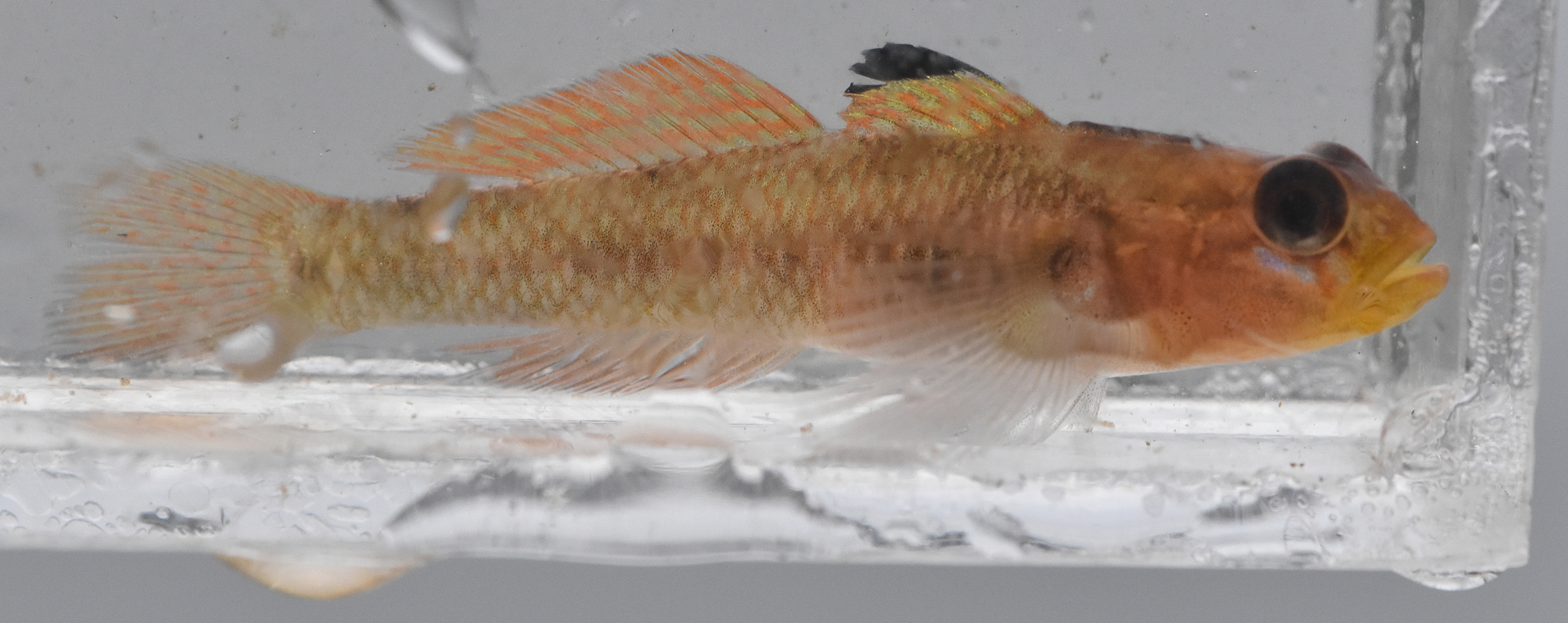
In British Columbia

Blackeye gobies are found in the eastern North Pacific, along the coasts of Canada, the United States, and Mexico. It reaches as far north as St. John Baptist Bay (near Partofshikof Island) in Alaska to as far south as San Martin Island of Baja California, Mexico. Its range does not extend into the Gulf of California, however.

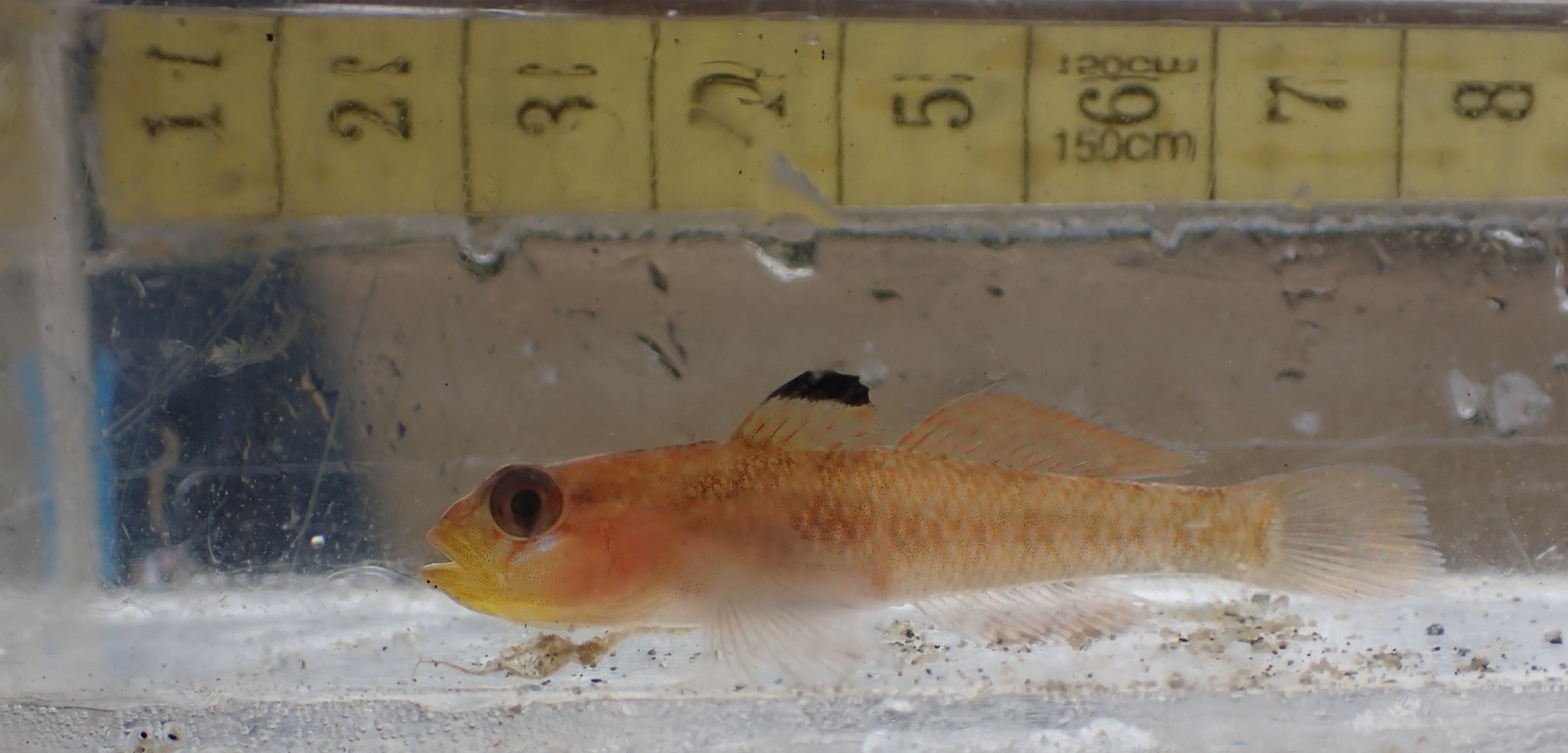
With scale bar, in British Columbia

Its northern range was previously believed to have reached only as far as Skidegate Channel in the Haida Gwaii Archipelago and the waters around Wales Island, both in British Columbia. However, a 2000 survey recovered blackeye gobies from Sitka and Klawock in southeastern Alaska. This makes the blackeye goby the only known species of goby to be found in Alaskan waters, though the arrow goby (Clevelandia ios) and the bay goby (Lepidogobius lepidus) have also been recovered from northern British Columbia. Subsequent observations on the recovered specimens in aquaria noted that blackeye gobies could only survive in temperatures exceeding 4 °C (39 °F), making them unlikely to be found further north than St. John Baptist Bay.

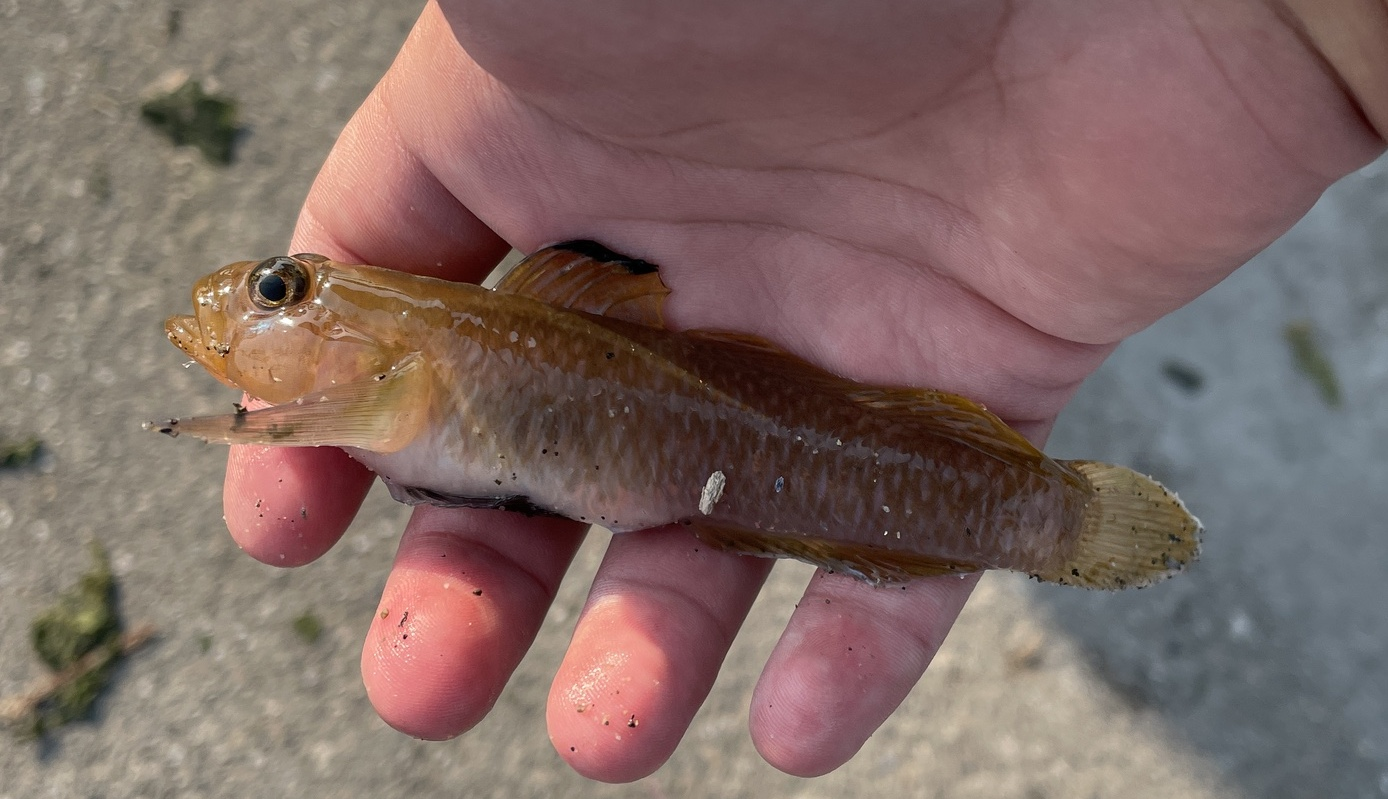
In Puget Sound (WA)

Blackeye gobies are extremely abundant. They are exclusively marine and usually inhabit rocks and reefs from intertidal areas to depths of 60 m (200 ft) from the surface, though they have been found in depths as much as 106 m (348 ft). They are most commonly found in the border area between reefs and sand bottoms. They usually seek out natural crevices and holes in the rock and reef surfaces but are capable of digging their own burrows in softer substrates if needed. They are difficult to see due to their habit of resting completely still until approached closely. When threatened they dart quickly back to their shelters.

== Ecology and behaviour ==
Blackeye gobies are highly territorial. Each male usually guards a harem of two to eight females and a small territory around a shelter. They are diurnal and mostly prey on small crustaceans and mollusks. They are protogynous hermaphrodites, with all individuals being born females and turning into males once they reach a certain size under the correct conditions. They exhibit courtship display and breed between April and October. The larvae are pelagic.

=== Social behavior ===
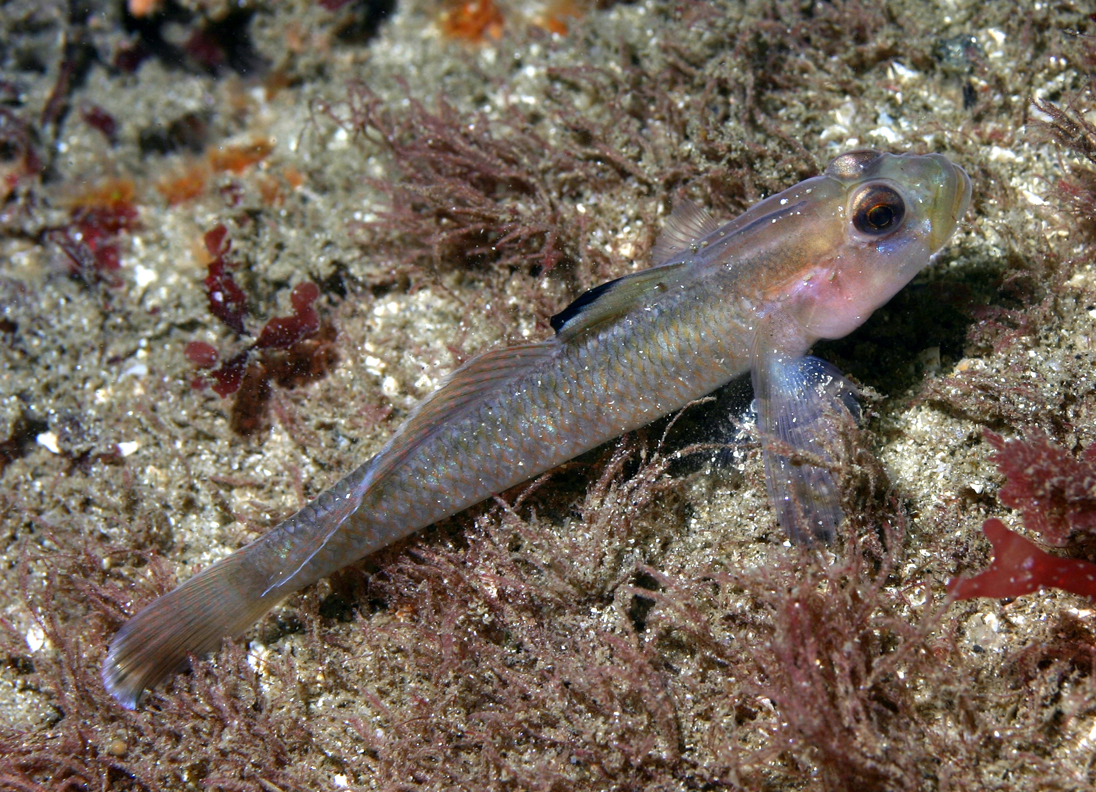
Showing coloration typical of a subordinate individual

Male blackeye gobies form harem with both females and juveniles. The males in such groups are usually larger than the female members, typically 9 to 11 cm (3.5 to 4.3 in) in length, while the females range in size from 3.2 to 8.1 cm (1.3 to 3.2 in).

Males are highly territorial and actively defend nest sites and females from intruders. Their territories can range from as small as 0.01 m^{2} (16 sq in) to as large as 1.18 m^{2} (12.7 sq ft). Larger males defend larger territories. During breeding season, the size of the territorial range can decrease even further as males concentrate on closely guarding the nests instead of foraging.

Due to the relative closeness of the territories, males often encounter each other. When two males meet, they approach each other, slowly undulating their bodies, and assume combat-threat display with all fins stiffly outstretched. Once directly face-to-face, they gape their mouths and expand their throats. They take turns doing this until the "loser" assumes a mottled darker coloration and retreats to his shelter. From then on, the established dominant fish may harass the subordinate fish by chasing or nipping him if he strays too close.

=== Reproduction and life history ===
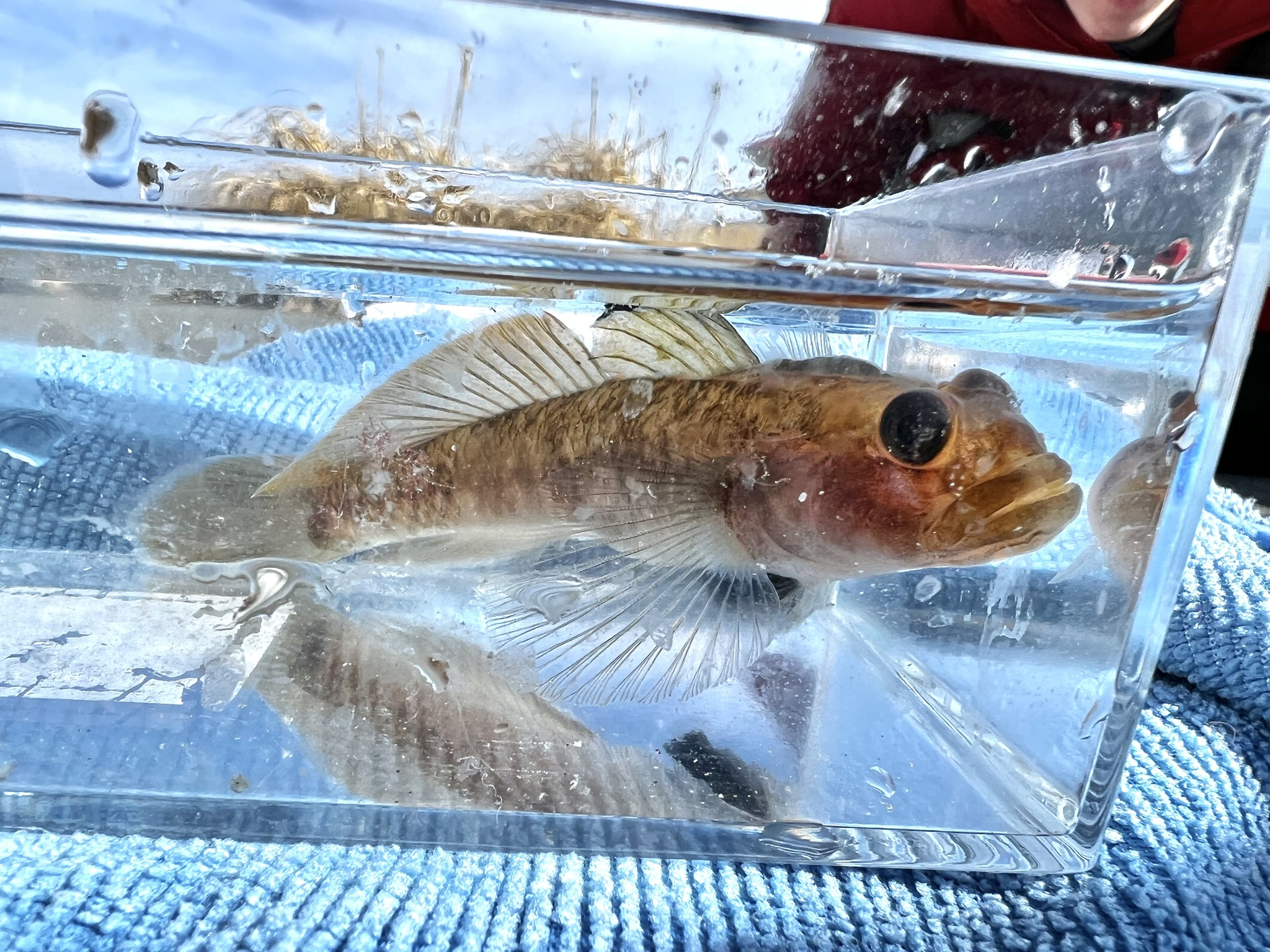
In mottled brown colouration, in B.C.

Blackeye gobies are sexually dimorphic, with different sexes distinguishable from genital papilla, size, and length of dorsal and anal fins. Females attain sexual maturity at 4.73 to 7.35 cm (1.86 to 2.89 in) in length, while males mature at 7.21 to 8.3 cm (2.84 to 3.27 in) in length. The breeding season lasts for five to seven months, between April and October. During this, the fused pelvic fins (the disk) of the males turn very dark in color.

They exhibit interesting courtship behavior. Males first prepare a nesting site by fanning, rubbing, scooping, and nibbling a selected area. They then entice females into the nesting site by swimming up for 2 ft (0.61 m) or more with mouths open and fins outstretched then back down again. After doing this once or several times, they resume cleaning the nest site. At times, the males may also rush towards the females. Uninterested females often swim away to a shelter, in which case the males give chase, often nipping her fins. Interested females directly approach the males and slowly undulate their bodies while opening their mouths widely and spreading their fins.

The females spawn a single layer of around 1700 eggs on the bottom surface of the nest, and may spawn several times. The males follow the females around as they lay the eggs, constantly nipping and bumping them. The males then fertilize the eggs during or immediately after they have been laid. The eggs are spindle-shaped and attached directly to rock surfaces. They are a pinkish to orange color when freshly laid but darken as they mature. The males defend the eggs until they hatch (after 10 to 33 days).

The newly hatched planktonic larvae are 3 mm (0.12 in) in length and grow rapidly. They are pelagic, and can be found more than 104.6 km (65.0 mi) from the shore at depths of several thousands of feet. They differ from adults in having dark-orange vertical bands. They mature after their first winter.

The longest known lifespan in an individual is five years.

=== Protogynous hermaphroditism ===
Blackeye gobies are protogynous hermaphrodites – all of them are born females but can shift once to become males once they reach a length of 2 to 3 in (5.1 to 7.6 cm). This is likely to be the result of the limited availability of good nesting sites. Larger males have a competitive advantage in defending these nesting sites, thus larger males and smaller females have much higher reproductive success rates than small males. A change in sex ratio and size distribution can cause of females to undergo the change to become males.

Sex change in blackeye gobies has been correlated with the steroids 17β-estradiol and 11-ketotestosterone. A decrease in the former and an increase in the latter induces females to change to males. This has been artificially replicated in laboratory conditions with the application of 11-ketotestosterone, 11-ketoadrenosterone, and fadrozole (an aromatase inhibitor) on females. The change from female to male takes about four weeks in captive individuals, but the length of time it takes in the wild is unknown.

=== Diet and predators ===
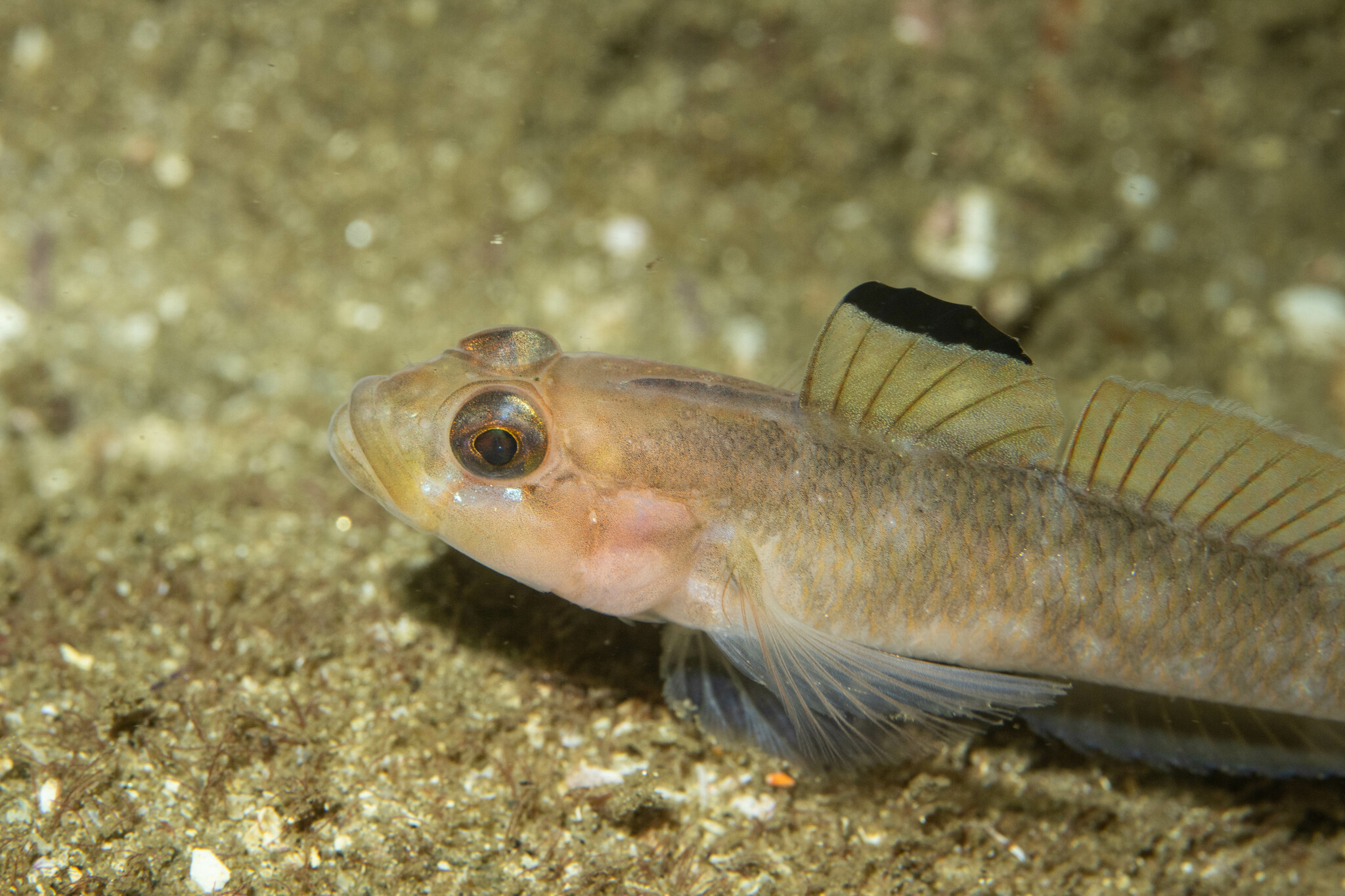
In California

Blackeye gobies are diurnal, being primarily active during daytime. They feed almost exclusively on small crustaceans and mollusks. The most common prey include amphipods, copepods, isopods, decapods (particularly hermit crabs), snails, and clams. Other less important prey include annelids and other invertebrates. Parts of echinoderms (mostly sea urchins) and bryozoans are also found in the contents of the stomachs of blackeye gobies, though this is likely the result of incidental ingestion rather than true predation. The preferred prey can vary by season depending on their abundance. Blackeye gobies have also been observed feeding directly on chemosynthetic bacterial mats. It is of particular significance if substantiated, as it would be the first known instance of a fish deriving nutrition directly from chemosynthetic bacteria. Blackeye gobies feed mostly by simply picking off the prey directly from the substrate. Occasionally, they may feed by taking a mouthful of substrate, spitting it out, then picking off edible prey as it drifts to the bottom.

Blackeye gobies are heavily preyed upon, in turn, by bass (such as kelp bass and barred sand bass), rock cod, greenling, and other predatory fishes of their rock and reef habitats, as well as birds such as Brandt's cormorants and double-crested cormorants. Sea urchins of the genus Strongylocentrotus are also known to dislodge blackeye gobies from their territories, possibly as a result of egg predation by the former.

Parasites of blackeye gobies include the trematodes Pronoprymna petrowi and Lecithaster gibbosus.

== In aquaculture ==
Blackeye gobies adapt well to aquaria and are often caught alive for such purposes. However, they can be troublesome if kept with other males and other species of fish, as they are extremely territorial and aggressive.
