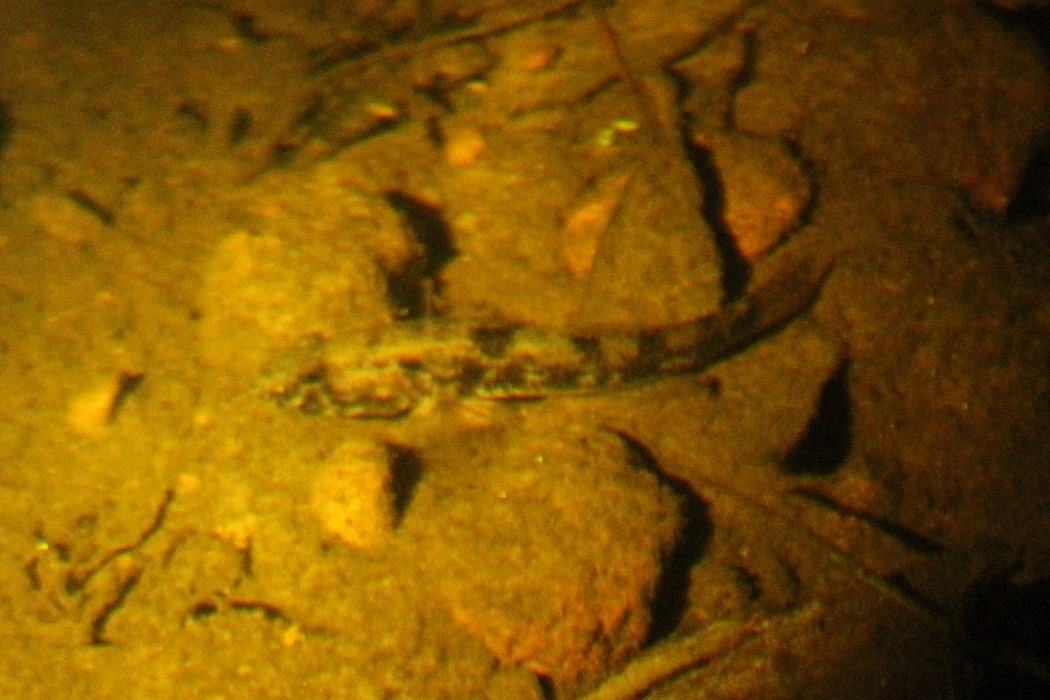
- Afurcagobius suppositus

Scientific classification
- Kingdom: Animalia
- Phylum: Chordata
- Class: Actinopterygii
- Order: Gobiiformes
- Family: Gobiidae
- Subfamily: Gobiinae
- Genus: Afurcagobius; H. S. Gill, 1993

Type species
- Gobius suppositus Sauvage, 1880

= Afurcagobius =

Genus of fishes

Afurcagobius is a small genus of gobies endemic to Australia.

== Species ==
There are two species currently recognized in the genus Afurcagobius:

- Afurcagobius suppositus (Sauvage, 1880) - long-headed goby
- Afurcagobius tamarensis (R. M. Johnston, 1883) - Tamar River goby
