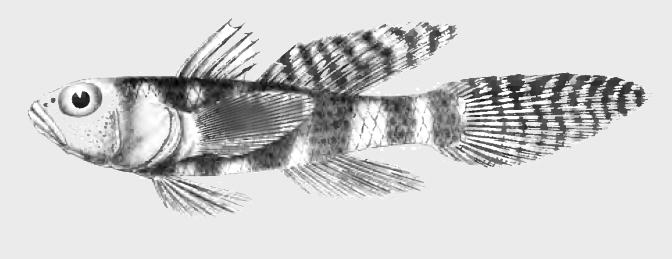
- Obliquogobius cometes

Scientific classification
- Kingdom: Animalia
- Phylum: Chordata
- Class: Actinopterygii
- Order: Gobiiformes
- Family: Gobiidae
- Genus: Obliquogobius; Koumans, 1941

Type species
- Gobius cometes Alcock, 1890

Synonyms
- Orissagobius Herre, 1945

= Obliquogobius =

Genus of fishes

Obliquogobius is a genus of gobies native to the Indian Ocean and the northwestern Pacific Ocean.

== Species ==
There are currently nine species assigned to this genus:

- Obliquogobius bathyalis Fricke, 2022
- Obliquogobius cirrifer Shibukawa & Aonuma, 2007
- Obliquogobius cometes (Alcock, 1890)
- Obliquogobius eptactis Kyoji Fujiwara, Peter N. Psomadakis, Thet Yu Yu Swe & Hiroyuki Motomura
- Obliquogobius fulvostriatus I. S. Chen, Jaafar & K. T. Shao, 2012
- Obliquogobius megalops Shibukawa & Aonuma, 2007
- Obliquogobius trifasciatus Fujiwara & Shibukawa, 2022
- Obliquogobius turkayi Goren, 1992
- Obliquogobius yamadai Shibukawa & Aonuma, 2007
