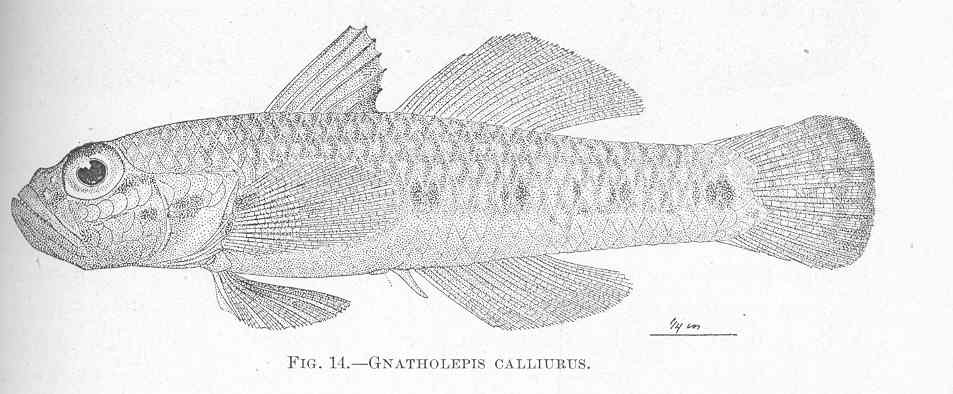
- Illustration

Conservation status
- Data Deficient (IUCN 3.1)

Scientific classification
- Kingdom: Animalia
- Phylum: Chordata
- Class: Actinopterygii
- Order: Gobiiformes
- Family: Gobiidae
- Genus: Arcygobius; Larson & J. E. Wright, 2003
- Species: A. baliurus

Binomial name
- Arcygobius baliurus (Valenciennes, 1837)

Synonyms
- For genus Arcygobius: Isthmogobius Koumans (ex Bleeker), 1931; For species A. baliurus: Gobius baliurus Valenciennes, 1837; Acentrogobius baliurus (Valenciennes, 1837); Gnatholepis baliurus (Valenciennes, 1837); Isthmogobius baliurus (Valenciennes, 1837); Gnatholepis calliurus D. S. Jordan & Seale, 1905; Gobius atherinoides Peters, 1855; Oplopomops atherinoides (Peters 1855); Opua atherinoides (Peters, 1855)

= Isthmus goby =

Species of fish

The Isthmus goby (Arcygobius baliurus) is a species of goby native to marine and brackish waters of the Indian Ocean and the western Pacific Ocean where it can be found at depths of from 3 to 15 metres (9.8 to 49.2 ft). This species lives on substrates consisting of a mix of sand and rubble. This species grows to a length of 10.2 centimetres (4.0 in) SL. This species is the only known member of its genus.
