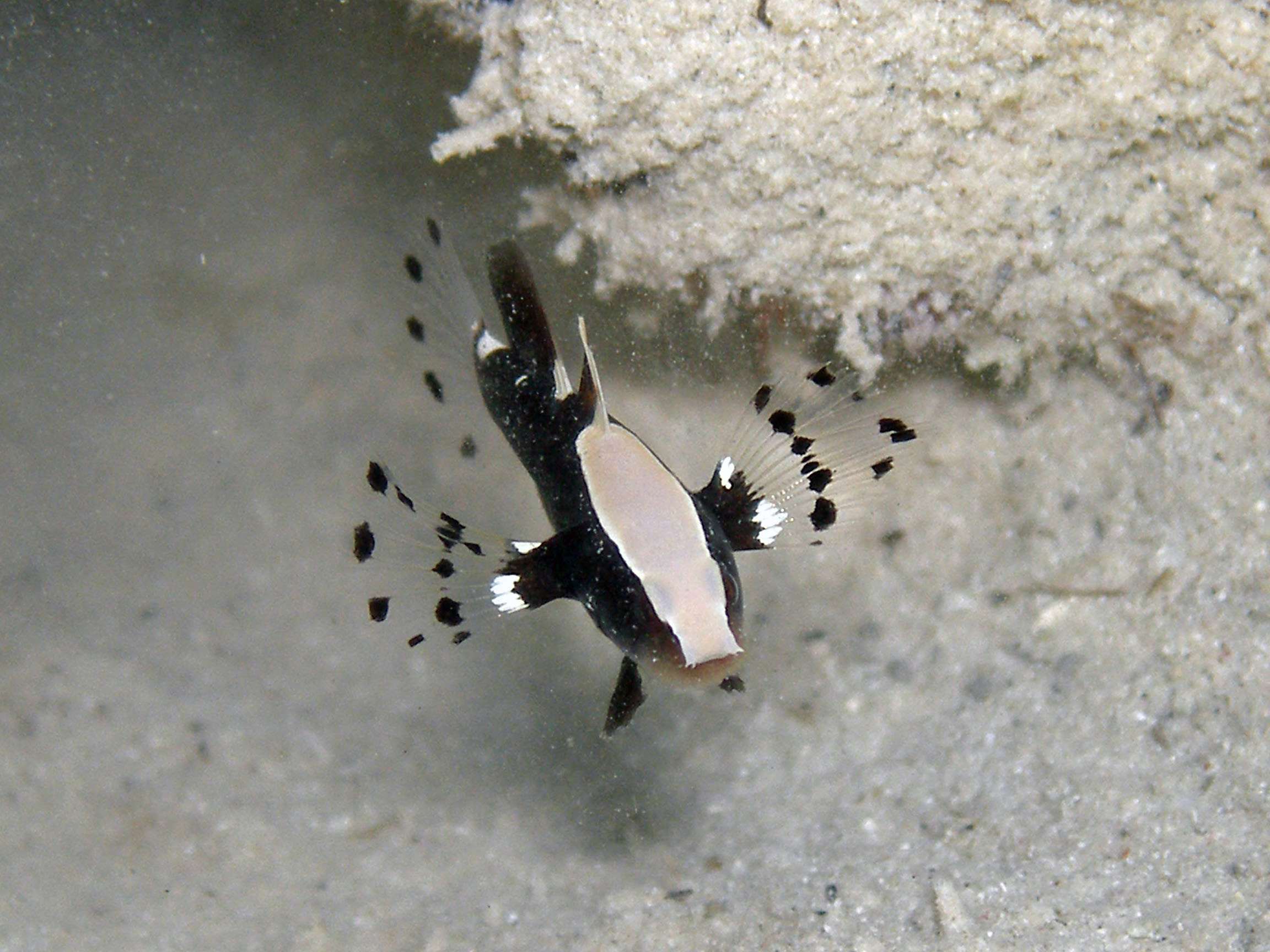
- Lotilia Graciliosa at house reef (Cebu, Philippines)

Scientific classification
- Domain: Eukaryota
- Kingdom: Animalia
- Phylum: Chordata
- Class: Actinopterygii
- Order: Gobiiformes
- Family: Gobiidae
- Genus: Lotilia; Klausewitz, 1960

Type species
- Lotilia graciliosa Klausewitz, 1960

= Lotilia =

Genus of fishes

Lotilia is a small genus of gobies native to the Indo-Pacific region. The members of this genus are commensal with shrimps of the genus Alpheus.

== Species ==
There are two recognized species in this genus:

- Lotilia graciliosa Klausewitz, 1960 (Whitecap goby)
- Lotilia klausewitzi Shibukawa, T. Suzuki & Senou, 2012
