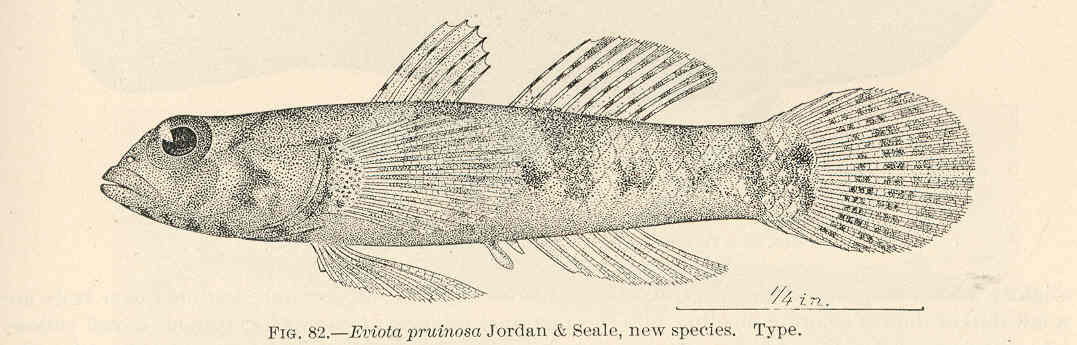
- Palutrus pruinosa

Scientific classification
- Kingdom: Animalia
- Phylum: Chordata
- Class: Actinopterygii
- Order: Gobiiformes
- Family: Gobiidae
- Genus: Palutrus; J. L. B. Smith, 1959

Type species
- Palutrus reticularis J. L. B. Smith, 1959

= Palutrus =

Genus of fishes

Palutrus is a genus of gobies native to the Indian Ocean and the western Pacific Ocean.

== Species ==
There are currently four recognized species in this genus:

- Palutrus meteori (Klausewitz & Zander, 1967) (Meteor goby)
- Palutrus pruinosa (D. S. Jordan & Seale, 1906) (Pruinosa goby)
- Palutrus reticularis J. L. B. Smith, 1959
- Palutrus scapulopunctatus (de Beaufort, 1912) (Scapular goby)
