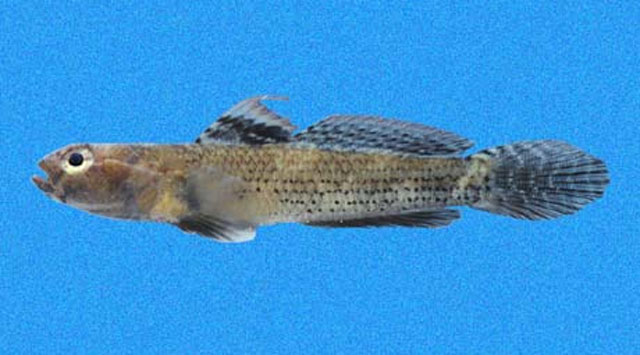
- Male
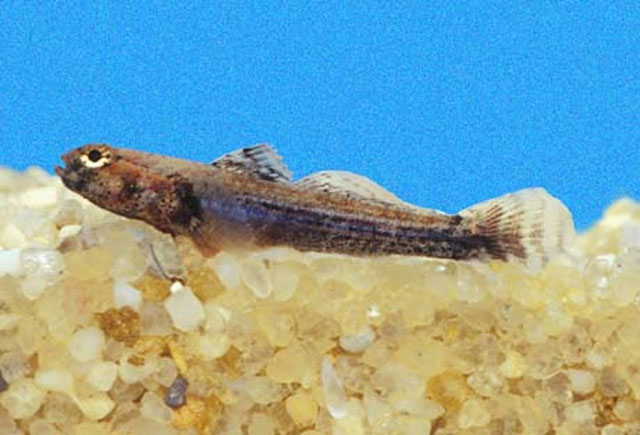
- Female

Conservation status
- Least Concern (IUCN 3.1)

Scientific classification
- Kingdom: Animalia
- Phylum: Chordata
- Class: Actinopterygii
- Order: Gobiiformes
- Family: Gobiidae
- Genus: Aboma; Jordan & Starks, 1895
- Species: A. etheostoma

Binomial name
- Aboma etheostoma D. S. Jordan & Starks, 1895
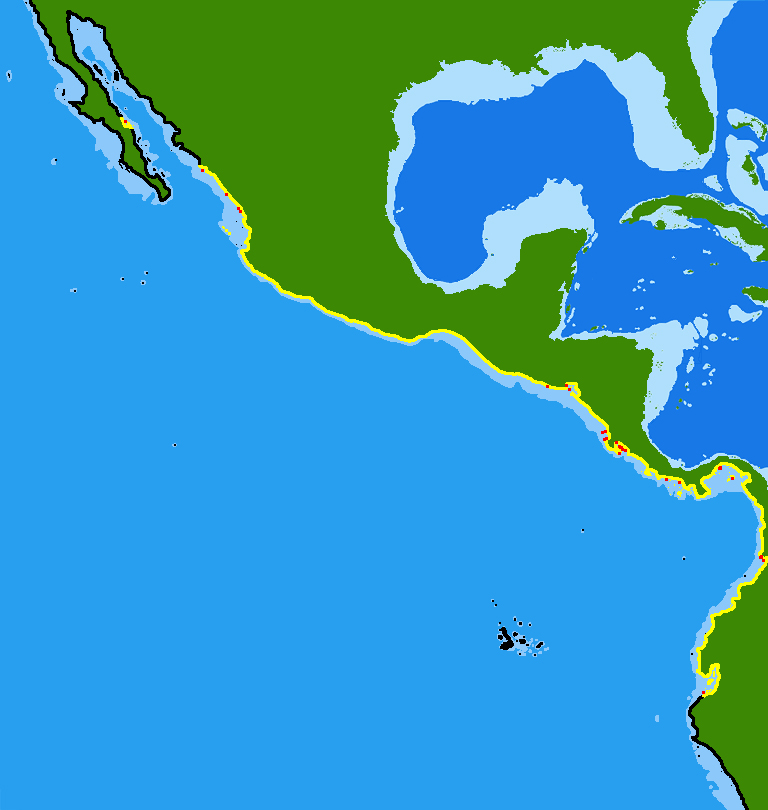

Synonyms
- Gobiosoma etheostoma (D. S. Jordan & Starks, 1895); Gobiosoma polyporosum C. E. Dawson, 1969

= Scaly boy =

Species of fish

The scaly boy (Aboma etheostoma), also known as the scaly goby, is a species of goby native to the Pacific coast of Central America from Mexico to Panama. This species is the only known member of its genus.

== Description ==
The scaly boy can grow as long as 3.4 centimetres (1.3 in). It has notably large eyes and a small mouth, as well as being mottled light brown in color.

== Habitat ==
This species is demersal, inhabiting shallow estuaries with a substrate of mud and sand to a depth of 8 m. This habitat is impacted by the expansion of shrimp farming, aquaculture, and mangrove destruction.
