= Fire-eyed goby =

Scientific classification
- Kingdom: Animalia
- Phylum: Chordata
- Class: Actinopterygii
- Order: Gobiiformes
- Family: Gobiidae
- Genus: Yoga
- Species: Y. pyrops

Binomial name
- Yoga pyrops (Whitley, 1954)

Synonyms
- Ctenogobius pyrops Whitley, 1954; Acentrogobius pyrops (Whitley, 1954)

Species of fish

The fire-eyed goby (Yoga pyrops) is a species of goby endemic to the marine waters around Australia.
