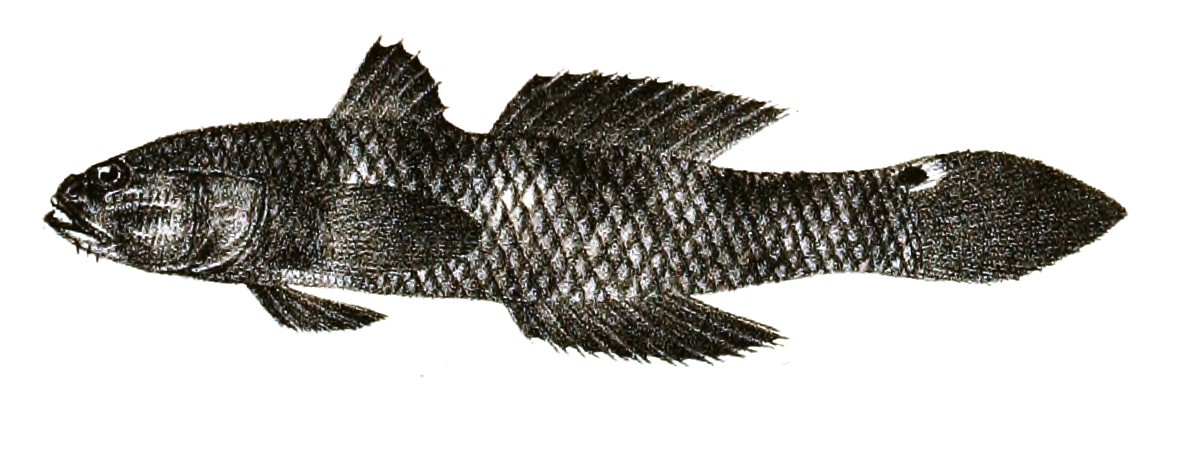
- Parachaeturichthys polynema

Scientific classification
- Kingdom: Animalia
- Phylum: Chordata
- Class: Actinopterygii
- Order: Gobiiformes
- Family: Gobiidae
- Genus: Parachaeturichthys; Bleeker, 1874

Type species
- Chaeturichthys polynema Bleeker, 1853

= Parachaeturichthys =

Genus of fishes

Parachaeturichthys is a genus of gobies native to deep waters of the Indian Ocean and the western Pacific Ocean.

== Species ==
There are currently two recognized species in this genus:

- Parachaeturichthys ocellatus (F. Day, 1873)
- Parachaeturichthys polynema (Bleeker, 1853) (Taileyed goby)
