= Phoxacromion =

Conservation status
- Data Deficient (IUCN 3.1)

Scientific classification
- Kingdom: Animalia
- Phylum: Chordata
- Class: Actinopterygii
- Division: Teleostei
- Order: Gobiiformes
- Family: Gobiidae
- Genus: Phoxacromion
- Species: P. kaneharai

Binomial name
- Phoxacromion kaneharai Shibukawa, T. Suzuki & Senou, 2010

Species of fish

Phoxacromion kaneharai is a species of goby native to the Pacific waters around the Ryukyus where it occurs in sheltered bays at depths of from 2 to 3 metres (7 to 10 ft). This fish seeks shelter under pieces of rubble on pebble or sandy substrates. Males of this species grow to a length of 2.2 centimetres (0.87 in) SL while females only reach a length of 2 centimetres (0.79 in) SL. This species is the only known member of its genus.
