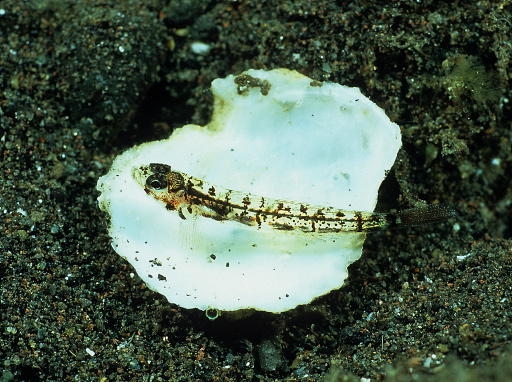
- Grallenia lipi

Scientific classification
- Domain: Eukaryota
- Kingdom: Animalia
- Phylum: Chordata
- Class: Actinopterygii
- Order: Gobiiformes
- Family: Gobiidae
- Genus: Grallenia; Shibukawa & Iwata, 2007

Type species
- Grallenia arenicola Shibukawa & Iwata, 2007

= Grallenia =

Genus of fishes

Grallenia is a genus of gobies native to the western Pacific Ocean.

== Species ==
There are currently 8 recognized species in this genus:

- Grallenia arenicola Shibukawa & Iwata, 2007
- Grallenia baliensis G. R. Allen & Erdmann, 2012 (Bali goby)
- Grallenia compta G. R. Allen & Erdmann, 2017 (Ornamented goby)
- Grallenia dimorpha G. R. Allen & Erdmann, 2017 (Dimorphic goby)
- Grallenia lauensis G. R. Allen & Erdmann, 2017 (Lau goby)
- Grallenia lipi Shibukawa & Iwata, 2007 (Filamented pygmy sand-goby)
- Grallenia rubrilineata G. R. Allen & Erdmann, 2017 (Red-stripe goby)
- Grallenia solomonensis G. R. Allen & Erdmann, 2017 (Solomons goby)
