= Whiteband goby =

Conservation status
- Data Deficient (IUCN 3.1)

Scientific classification
- Kingdom: Animalia
- Phylum: Chordata
- Class: Actinopterygii
- Order: Gobiiformes
- Family: Gobiidae
- Genus: Paedovaricus; Van Tassell, Tornabene & Gilmore, 2016
- Species: P. imswe

Binomial name
- Paedovaricus imswe Greenfield, 1981

Synonyms
- Varicus imswe Greenfield, 1981; Chriolepis imswe (Greenfield, 1981)

Species of fish

The whiteband goby (Paedovaricus imswe) is a species of ray-finned fish from the family Gobiidae. It has only been recorded from two sites, the Eleuthera Islands in the Bahamas and Carrie Bow Cay in Belize.
