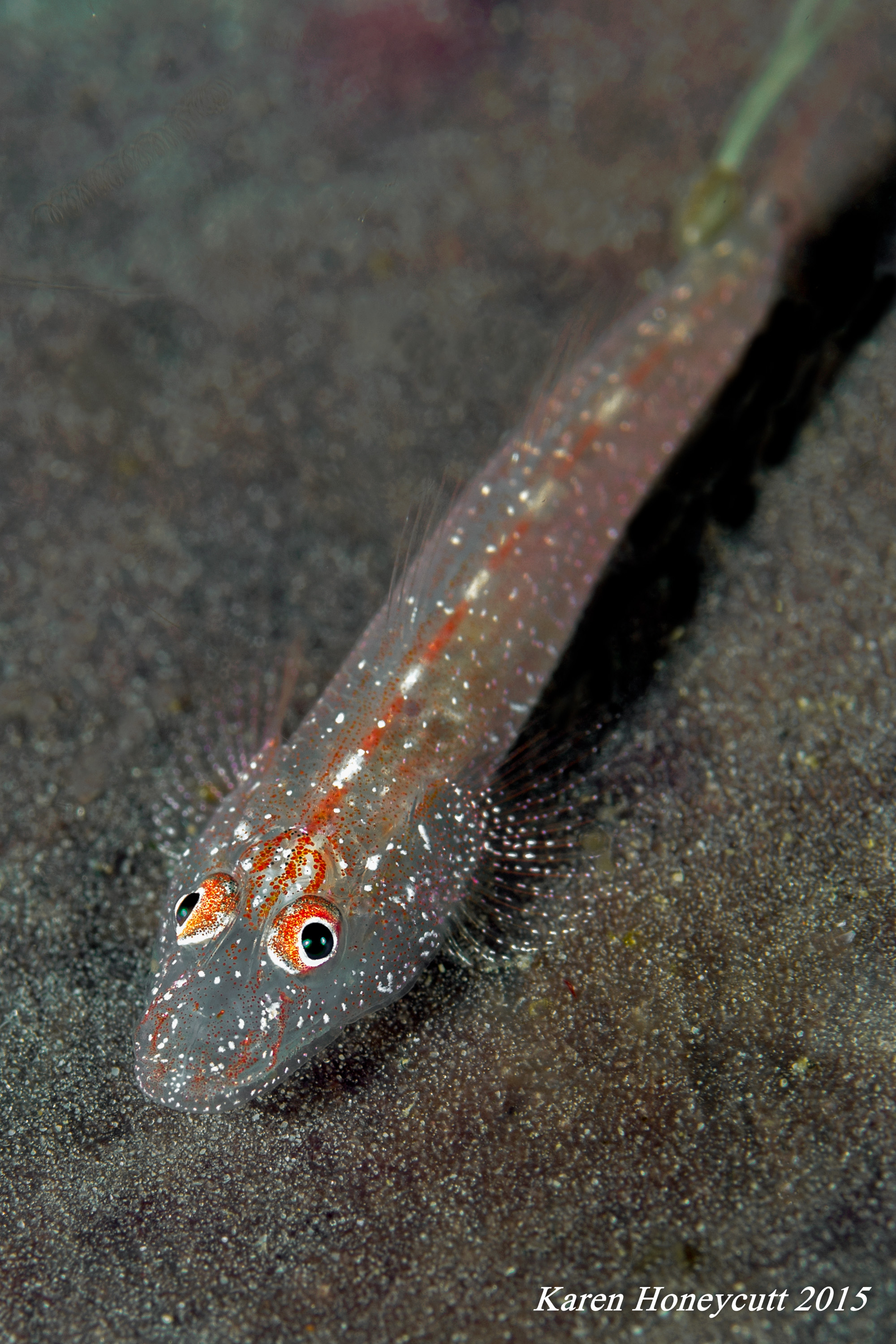

Conservation status
- Least Concern (IUCN 3.1)

Scientific classification
- Kingdom: Animalia
- Phylum: Chordata
- Class: Actinopterygii
- Order: Gobiiformes
- Family: Gobiidae
- Genus: Phyllogobius; Larson, 1986
- Species: P. platycephalops

Binomial name
- Phyllogobius platycephalops (J. L. B. Smith, 1964)

Synonyms
- Cottogobius platycephalops J. L. B. Smith, 1964

= Slender spongegoby =

Species of fish

Phyllogobius platycephalops, the Slender spongegoby, is a species of goby native to the western Indian Ocean and the western Pacific Ocean where it occurs on reefs at depths of from 2 to 18 metres (10 to 60 ft). This species is a commensal on sponges of the genus Phyllospongia. This species grows to a length of 5 centimetres (2.0 in) SL. This species is the only known member of its genus.
