= Blackspot minigoby =

Conservation status
- Least Concern (IUCN 3.1)

Scientific classification
- Kingdom: Animalia
- Phylum: Chordata
- Class: Actinopterygii
- Order: Gobiiformes
- Family: Gobiidae
- Genus: Minysicya; Larson, 2002
- Species: M. caudimaculata

Binomial name
- Minysicya caudimaculata Larson, 2002

Species of fish

The Blackspot minigoby (Minysicya caudimaculata) is a species of goby native to the eastern Indian Ocean and the western Pacific Ocean from Australia to Japan to the Tuamotus and French Polynesia where it can be found inhabiting reefs at depths of from 3 to 38 metres (10 to 120 ft). Males of this species grow to a length of 1.3 centimetres (0.51 in) SL while females can reach a length of 1.5 centimetres (0.59 in) SL. This species is the only known member of its genus.
