= Nineline goby =

Conservation status
- Least Concern (IUCN 3.1)

Scientific classification
- Kingdom: Animalia
- Phylum: Chordata
- Class: Actinopterygii
- Order: Gobiiformes
- Family: Gobiidae
- Genus: Ginsburgellus; J. E. Böhlke & C. R. Robins, 1968
- Species: G. novemlineatus

Binomial name
- Ginsburgellus novemlineatus (Fowler, 1950)

Synonyms
- Gobiosoma novemlineatum Fowler, 1950

Species of fish

Ginsburgellus novemlineatus, the Nineline goby, is a species of goby native to tropical reefs of the western Atlantic Ocean and the Caribbean Sea. It is frequently found associated with the sea urchin Echinometra lucunter, living underneath the urchin. This species grows to a length of 2.5 centimetres (0.98 in) TL. This species can also be found in the aquarium trade. This species is the only known member of its genus, the name of which honours the ichthyologist Isaac Ginsburg (1886-1975) of the U.S. National Museum who had an interest in gobies.
