= Egglestonichthys =

Scientific classification
- Kingdom: Animalia
- Phylum: Chordata
- Class: Actinopterygii
- Order: Gobiiformes
- Family: Gobiidae
- Genus: Egglestonichthys; P. J. Miller & Wongrat, 1979

Type species
- Egglestonichthys patriciae P. J. Miller & Wongrat, 1979

Genus of fishes

Egglestonichthys is a genus of gobies native to brackish and marine waters of the Indian Ocean and the western Pacific Ocean.

== Species ==
These are the currently recognized species in this genus:

- Egglestonichthys bombylios Larson & Hoese, 1997 (Egglestone's bumblebee goby)
- Egglestonichthys fulmen Fujiwara, Suzuki & Motomura, 2020
- Egglestonichthys melanoptera (Rao, 1971)
- Egglestonichthys patriciae P. J. Miller & Wongrat, 1979
- Egglestonichthys rubidus G. R. Allen, Erdmann & William M. Brooks, 2020
- Egglestonichthys ulbubunitj Larson, 2013
