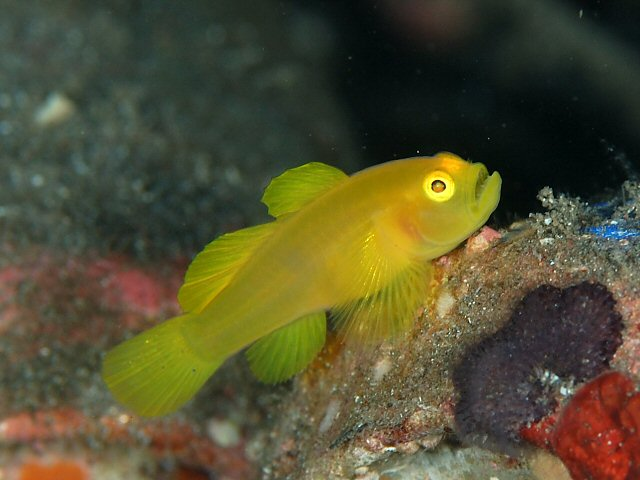
- Lubricogobius exiguus

Scientific classification
- Kingdom: Animalia
- Phylum: Chordata
- Class: Actinopterygii
- Order: Gobiiformes
- Family: Gobiidae
- Genus: Lubricogobius; S. Tanaka (I), 1915

Type species
- Lubricogobius exiguous Tanaka, 1915

Synonyms
- Gobiodonella Lindberg, 1934

= Lubricogobius =

Genus of fishes

Lubricogobius is a genus of fish in the family Gobiidae found in the Pacific Ocean.

== Species ==
There are currently 6 recognized species in this genus:

- Lubricogobius dinah J. E. Randall & Senou, 2001 (Dinah's goby)
- Lubricogobius exiguus S. Tanaka (I), 1915
- Lubricogobius nanus G. R. Allen, 2015 (Tiny goby)
- Lubricogobius ornatus Fourmanoir, 1966 (Ornate slippery goby)
- Lubricogobius tre Prokofiev, 2009
- Lubricogobius tunicatus G. R. Allen & Erdmann, 2016 (Tunicate goby)
