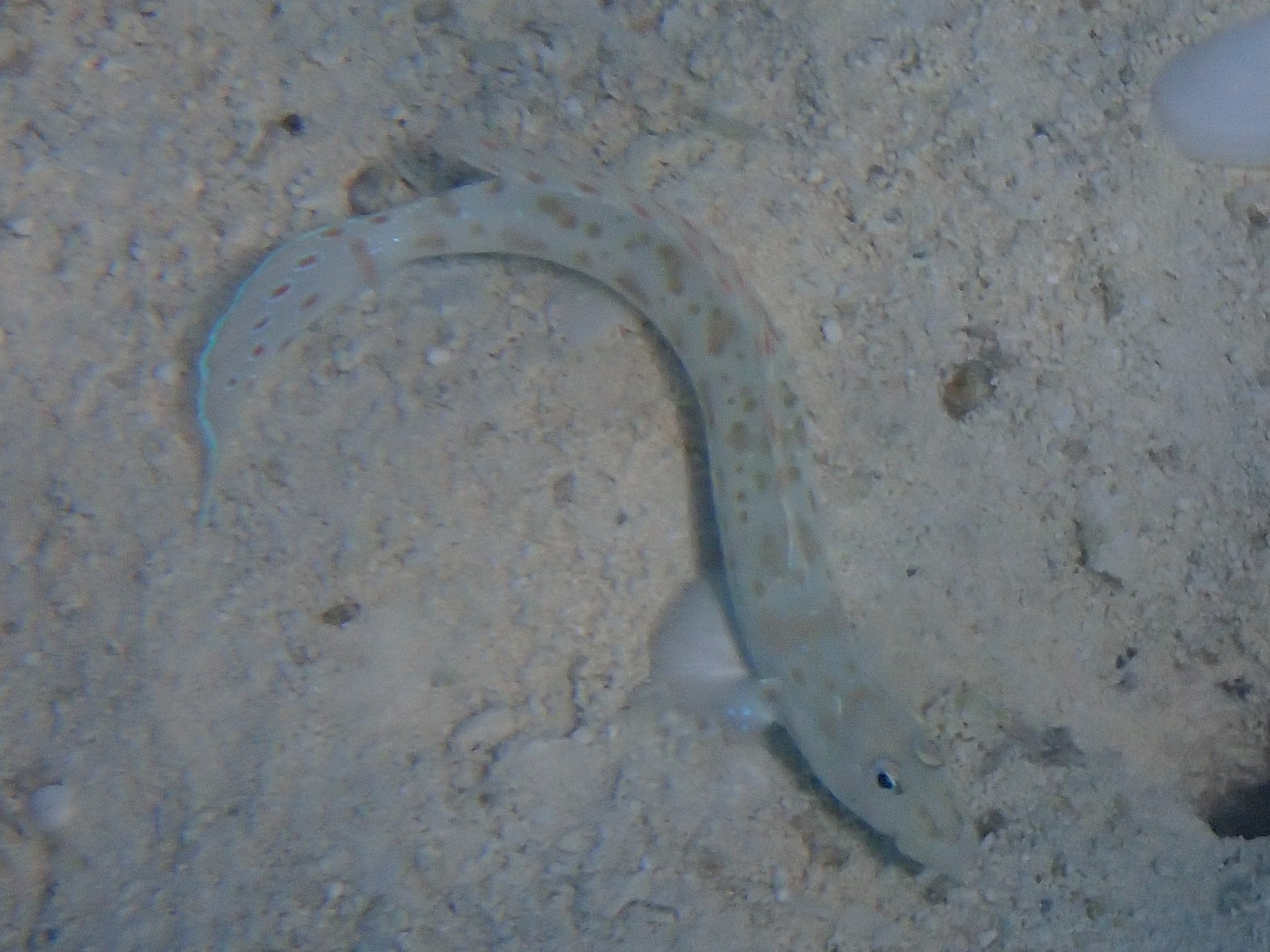

Conservation status
- Least Concern (IUCN 3.1)

Scientific classification
- Kingdom: Animalia
- Phylum: Chordata
- Class: Actinopterygii
- Order: Gobiiformes
- Family: Gobiidae
- Genus: Echinogobius; Iwata, S. Hosoya & Niimura, 1998
- Species: E. hayashii

Binomial name
- Echinogobius hayashii Iwata, S. Hosoya & Niimura, 1998

= Cheek-streaked goby =

Species of fish

Echinogobius hayashii, the cheek-streaked goby, is a species of goby found in the Indo-West Pacific from western Australia to Fiji and Japan. This species can be found at depths of from 1 to 20 metres (3.3 to 65.6 ft) living in areas with strong tidal currents and a sandy substrate. The cheek-streaked goby grows to a standard length of 7 centimetres (2.8 in). This species is the only known member of the monotypic genus Echinogobius.

== Etymology ==
The specific name honours Masayoshi Hayashi, a curator at Yokosuka City Museum, who collected the type specimens.
