= Heterogobius =

Scientific classification
- Kingdom: Animalia
- Phylum: Chordata
- Class: Actinopterygii
- Division: Teleostei
- Order: Gobiiformes
- Family: Gobiidae
- Genus: Heterogobius; Bleeker, 1874
- Species: H. chiloensis

Binomial name
- Heterogobius chiloensis (Guichenot, 1848)

Synonyms
- Gobius chiloensis Guichenot, 1848

Species of fish

Heterogobius chiloensis is a species of goby found along the Pacific coast of Chile. This species is the only known member of its genus.
