= Lemon goby =

Conservation status
- Data Deficient (IUCN 3.1)

Scientific classification
- Kingdom: Animalia
- Phylum: Chordata
- Class: Actinopterygii
- Order: Gobiiformes
- Family: Gobiidae
- Genus: Vomerogobius
- Species: V. flavus

Binomial name
- Vomerogobius flavus C. R. Gilbert, 1971

Species of fish

The lemon goby (Vomerogobius flavus) is a species of ray-finned fish, from the family Gobiidae. which is native to the marine waters around the Bahamas. It is the only known species in its genus.
