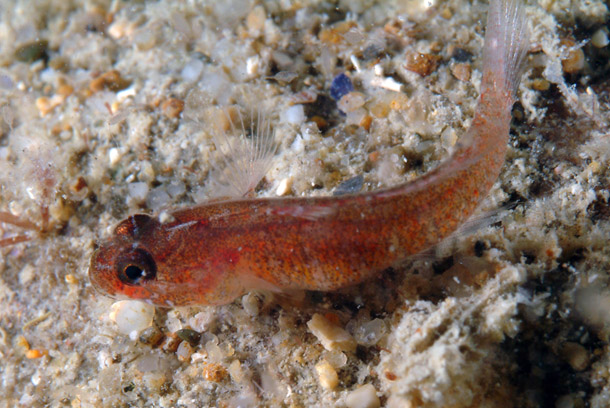

Conservation status
- Least Concern (IUCN 3.1)

Scientific classification
- Kingdom: Animalia
- Phylum: Chordata
- Class: Actinopterygii
- Order: Gobiiformes
- Family: Gobiidae
- Genus: Odondebuenia de Buen, 1930
- Species: O. balearica

Binomial name
- Odondebuenia balearica (Pellegrin & Fage, 1907)

Synonyms
- Eleotris balearicus Pellegrin & Fage, 1907

= Coralline goby =

Species of fish

Odondebuenia balearica, the Coralline goby, is a species of goby native to the Mediterranean Sea where it prefers coralline areas at depths of from 20 to 70 metres (66 to 230 ft). This species grows to a length of 3.2 centimetres (1.3 in) TL. This species is the only known member of its genus.
