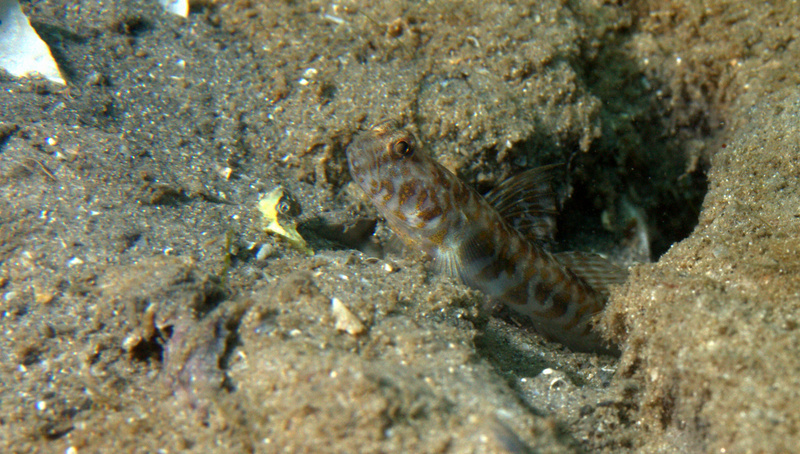

Conservation status
- Least Concern (IUCN 3.1)

Scientific classification
- Kingdom: Animalia
- Phylum: Chordata
- Class: Actinopterygii
- Order: Gobiiformes
- Family: Gobiidae
- Genus: Nes; Ginsburg, 1933
- Species: N. longus

Binomial name
- Nes longus (Nichols, 1914)

Synonyms
- Gobiosoma longum Nichols, 1914

= Orangespotted goby =

Species of fish

The orangespotted goby (Nes longus) is a species of goby native to the tropical Atlantic coast from Bermuda and southern Florida through the Caribbean Sea and Gulf of Mexico south to the Caribbean coasts of Venezuela and Colombia, where it prefers silty bottoms around reefs. It is a commensal with an alpheid shrimp. This species grows to a length of 10 centimetres (3.9 in) TL. This species is the only known member of its genus.

This species is symbiotic with snapper shrimp Alpheus floridanus, sharing the burrow with the shrimps, usually a pair, on unvegetated silty substrates in waters of less than 9 metres (30 ft) depth. The goby and its host shrimps interact closely and the goby is dependent on its hosts' burrow for cover. The goby acts as a sentinel, watching for danger from the entrance of the burrow. The diet of the orangespotted goby consists mainly of small gastropods, decapods, ostracods and isopods.
