= Cryptic bearded goby =

Conservation status
- Least Concern (IUCN 3.1)

Scientific classification
- Kingdom: Animalia
- Phylum: Chordata
- Class: Actinopterygii
- Order: Gobiiformes
- Family: Gobiidae
- Genus: Barbuligobius
- Species: B. boehlkei

Binomial name
- Barbuligobius boehlkei Lachner & McKinney, 1974

Synonyms
- Bathygobius boehlkei (Lachner & McKinney, 1974)

Species of fish

Barbuligobius boehlkei, the Cryptic bearded goby, is a species of goby native to the Indian Ocean and the western Pacific Ocean where it can be found on sand-rubble substrates at depths of from 1 to 15 metres (3.3 to 49.2 ft). This species grows to a length of 2 centimetres (0.79 in) SL. This species is the only known member of its genus. Its specific name honours James E. Böhlke (1930-1982) of the Academy of Natural Sciences of Philadelphia.
