= Chriolepis =

Scientific classification
- Kingdom: Animalia
- Phylum: Chordata
- Class: Actinopterygii
- Order: Gobiiformes
- Family: Gobiidae
- Subfamily: Gobiinae
- Genus: Chriolepis; C. H. Gilbert, 1892

Type species
- Chriolepis minutillus C. H. Gilbert, 1892

Synonyms
- Eleotriculus Ginsburg, 1938; Pycnomma Rutter, 1904

Genus of fishes

Chriolepis is a genus of gobies native to the Atlantic and Pacific coasts of the Americas.

== Species ==
There are currently 9 recognized species in this genus:

- Chriolepis cuneata W. A. Bussing, 1990 (Rail goby)
- Chriolepis dialepta W. A. Bussing, 1990
- Chriolepis fisheri Herre, 1942 (Translucent goby)
- Chriolepis lepidota Findley, 1975
- Chriolepis minutilla C. H. Gilbert, 1892 (Rubble goby)
- Chriolepis roosevelti (Ginsburg, 1939) (Roosevelt's goby)
- Chriolepis semisquamata (Rutter, 1904) (Secret goby)
- Chriolepis tagus Ginsburg, 1953 (Mystery goby)
- Chriolepis zebra Ginsburg, 1938 (Gecko goby)
