= Hole goby =

Scientific classification
- Kingdom: Animalia
- Phylum: Chordata
- Class: Actinopterygii
- Order: Gobiiformes
- Family: Gobiidae
- Genus: Oplopomops; J. L. B. Smith, 1959
- Species: O. diacanthus

Binomial name
- Oplopomops diacanthus (L. P. Schultz, 1943)

Synonyms
- Oplopomus diacanthus L. P. Schultz, 1943

Species of fish

The hole goby (Oplopomops diacanthus) is a species of ray-finned fish from the family Gobiidae which is native to the eastern Indian Ocean and the western Pacific Ocean where it can be found down to depths of 10 metres (30 ft). This fish occurs on patches of sand or rubble adjacent to reefs. This species grows to a length of 7.5 centimetres (3.0 in) SL. This species is the only known member of its genus.
