= Gladiogobius =

Scientific classification
- Kingdom: Animalia
- Phylum: Chordata
- Class: Actinopterygii
- Order: Gobiiformes
- Family: Gobiidae
- Genus: Gladiogobius; Herre, 1933

Type species
- Gladiogobius ensifer Herre, 1933

Genus of fishes

Gladiogobius is a genus of gobies native to the Indian and western Pacific oceans.

== Species ==
There are currently three recognized species in this genus:

- Gladiogobius brevispinis Shibukawa & G. R. Allen, 2007 (Short-spined goby)
- Gladiogobius ensifer Herre, 1933 (Gladiator goby)
- Gladiogobius rex Shibukawa & G. R. Allen, 2007 (King goby)
