= Cristatogobius =

Scientific classification
- Kingdom: Animalia
- Phylum: Chordata
- Class: Actinopterygii
- Order: Gobiiformes
- Family: Gobiidae
- Genus: Cristatogobius; Herre, 1927

Type species
- Cristatogobius lophius Herre, 1927

Genus of fishes

Cristatogobius is a genus of gobies native to the western Pacific Ocean.

== Species ==
There are currently five recognized species in this genus:

- Cristatogobius albius T. R. Chen, 1959
- Cristatogobius aurimaculatus Akihito & Meguro, 2000
- Cristatogobius lophius Herre, 1927
- Cristatogobius nonatoae (Ablan, 1940)
- Cristatogobius rubripectoralis Akihito, Meguro & Ka. Sakamoto, 2003 (Redfin crested goby)
