= Heteroplopomus =

Scientific classification
- Kingdom: Animalia
- Phylum: Chordata
- Class: Actinopterygii
- Division: Teleostei
- Order: Gobiiformes
- Family: Gobiidae
- Genus: Heteroplopomus; Tomiyama, 1936
- Species: H. barbatus

Binomial name
- Heteroplopomus barbatus (Tomiyama, 1934)

Synonyms
- Rhinogobius barbatus Tomiyama, 1934

Species of fish

Heteroplopomus barbatus is a species of goby native to the Pacific waters along the coasts of Japan where it inhabits areas with rocky bottoms. This species is the only known member of its genus.
