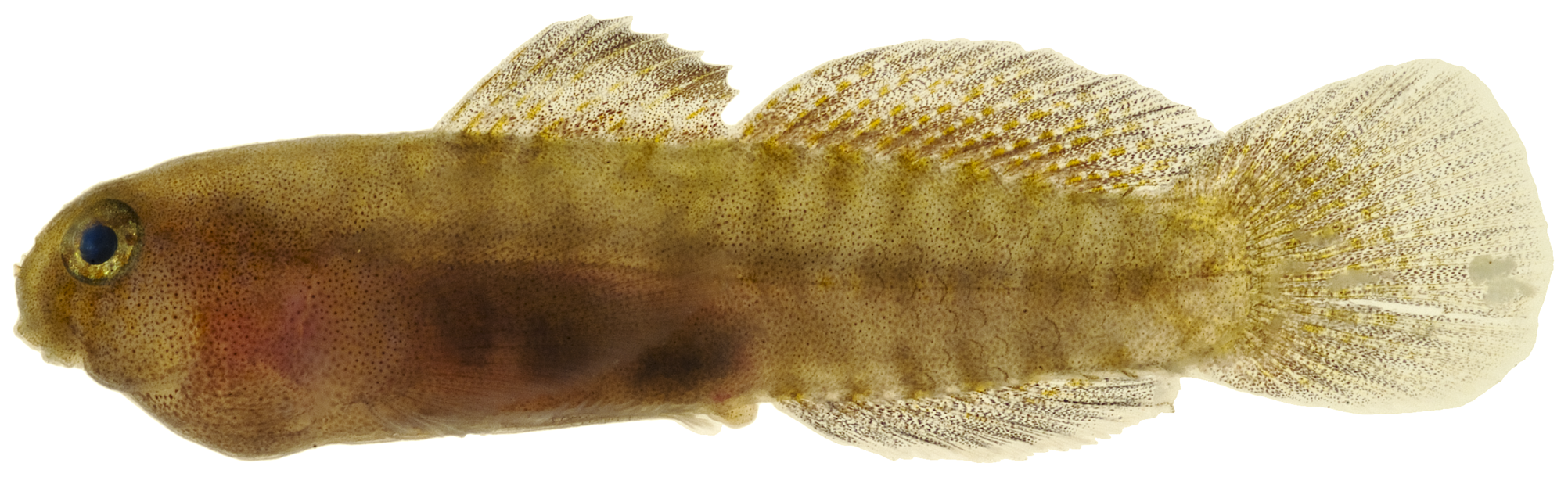

Conservation status
- Least Concern (IUCN 3.1)

Scientific classification
- Kingdom: Animalia
- Phylum: Chordata
- Class: Actinopterygii
- Division: Teleostei
- Order: Gobiiformes
- Family: Gobiidae
- Genus: Risor; Ginsburg, 1933
- Species: R. ruber

Binomial name
- Risor ruber (N. Rosén, 1911)

Synonyms
- Garmannia rubra Rosén, 1911

= Tusked goby =

Species of fish

The Tusked goby (Risor ruber), is a species of goby native to reefs of the western Atlantic Ocean from southern Florida to the Bahamas and south to northern Brazil. The species associates with barrel sponges, sometimes living within the sponge. This species can reach a length of 2.5 centimetres (0.98 in) TL. It is currently the only known member of its genus.
