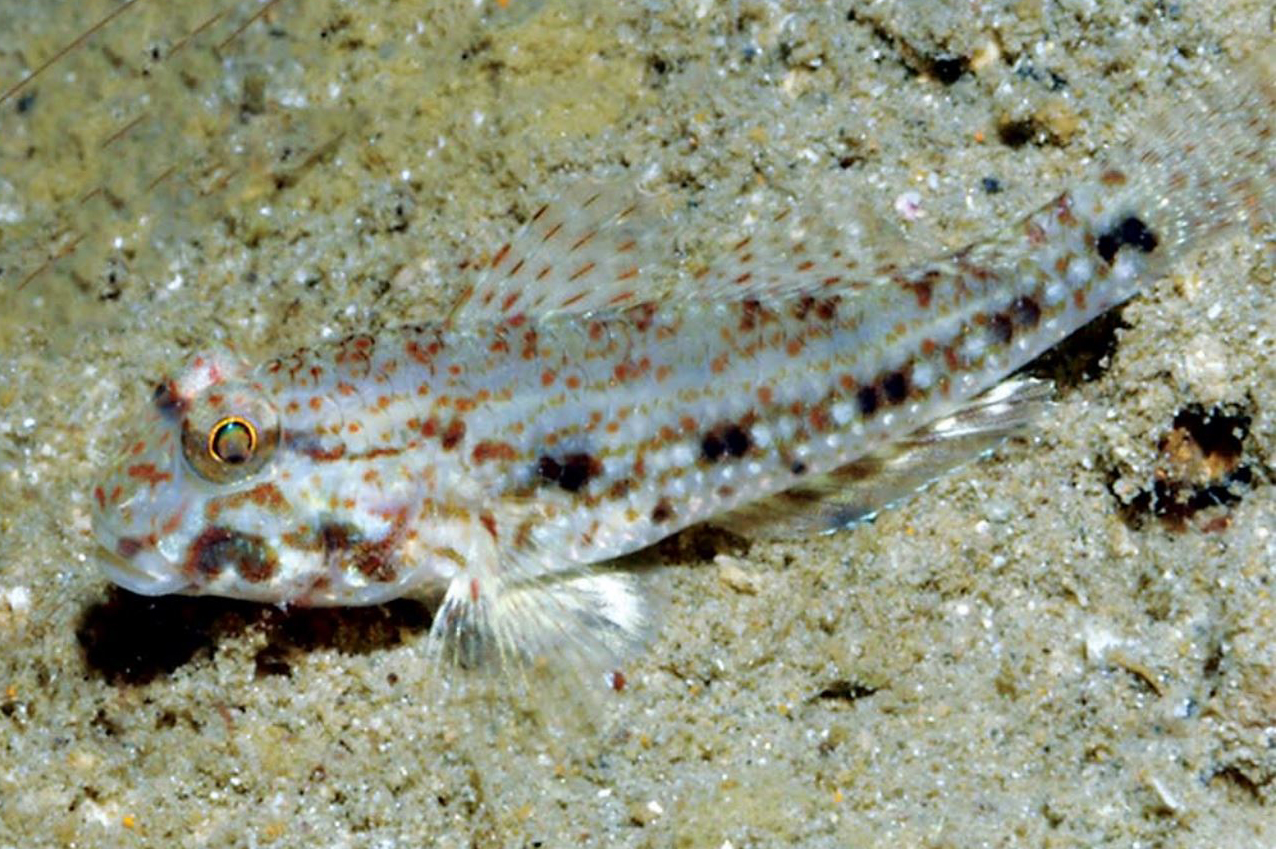
- Milne Bay, Papua New Guinea

Conservation status
- Least Concern (IUCN 3.1)

Scientific classification
- Kingdom: Animalia
- Phylum: Chordata
- Class: Actinopterygii
- Order: Gobiiformes
- Family: Gobiidae
- Genus: Macrodontogobius
- Species: M. wilburi

Binomial name
- Macrodontogobius wilburi Herre, 1936

Synonyms
- Gnatholepis hendersoni Herre, 1936; Acentrogobius hendersoni (Herre, 1936); Gnatholepis hololepis L. P. Schultz, 1943

= Largetooth goby =

Species of fish

The largetooth goby (Macrodontogobius wilburi), also known as Wilbur's goby, is a species of ray-finned fish from the family Gobiidae which is native to the Indo-Pacific from the Seychelles to Micronesia. Its known range has been extended to the Red Sea as specimens were photographed at one site and collected at another site off Egypt. This species lives in sheltered marine waters at depths of from 0 to 20 metres (0 to 66 ft) preferring areas with sandy substrates. This species grows to a length of 6.5 centimetres (2.6 in) SL. This species is the only known member of its genus. This species is not obviously sexually dimorphic and it has a background colour of pale brown to greenish-brown and a pale ventral side. The body is marked with brown and white spots, pairs of larger brown spots create a mid-lateral row along its flanks and there is a dark spot on the caudal fin peduncle. It has a brown blotch on the cheek and a series of short brown bars along its back. The largetooth goby is a solitary fish which is found in coastal bays, lagoons and estuaries over fine sandy substrates close to the margins of reefs or silt beds in the vicinity of sheltered and often turbid coastal reefs. It is most frequently collected from shallow waters to 7 metres (23 ft), around coral reefs but off southern Japan, the largetooth goby occurs at the bottom of sandy bays. The specific name honours the American physician, Ray Lyman Wilbur (1875–1949) who was president of Stanford University from 1916–1943, as well as being the United States Secretary of the Interior from 1929–1933. Wilbur helped the author, Herre, get to Palau, the type locality of this species.
