= Peppered goby =

Conservation status
- Least Concern (IUCN 3.1)

Scientific classification
- Kingdom: Animalia
- Phylum: Chordata
- Class: Actinopterygii
- Order: Gobiiformes
- Family: Gobiidae
- Genus: Pariah; J. E. Böhlke, 1969
- Species: P. scotius

Binomial name
- Pariah scotius J. E. Böhlke, 1969

Species of fish

The peppered goby (Pariah scotius) is a species of goby native to the waters around the Bahamas and Curaçao where it is mostly found inhabiting sponges, showing a particular affinity for Spheciospongia vesparia. This species is the only known member of its genus.
