= Ebomegobius =

Conservation status
- Data Deficient (IUCN 3.1)

Scientific classification
- Kingdom: Animalia
- Phylum: Chordata
- Class: Actinopterygii
- Order: Gobiiformes
- Family: Gobiidae
- Genus: Ebomegobius
- Species: E. goodi

Binomial name
- Ebomegobius goodi Herre, 1946

Species of fish

Ebomegobius goodi is a species of brackish water goby native to a stream in Cameroon and is known from a single specimen. This species grows to a length of 3.5 centimetres (1.4 in) SL. This species is the only known member of its genus. The genus name is a compound of Ebomé, the brackish stream where the species was found, and gobius while the specific name honours the missionary Albert Irwin Good (1884–1975), who collected West African fishes and collected the type of this species.
