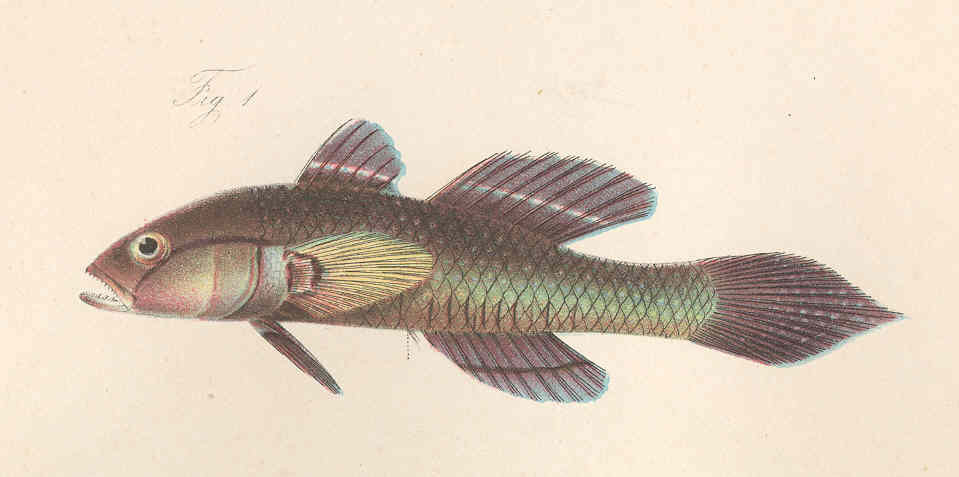

Conservation status
- Least Concern (IUCN 3.1)

Scientific classification
- Kingdom: Animalia
- Phylum: Chordata
- Class: Actinopterygii
- Division: Teleostei
- Order: Gobiiformes
- Family: Gobiidae
- Genus: Porogobius; Bleeker, 1874
- Species: P. schlegelii

Binomial name
- Porogobius schlegelii (Günther, 1861)

Synonyms
- Genus: Coronogobius Herre, 1945; Species: Gobius schlegelii Günther, 1861; Acentrogobius schlegelii (Günther, 1861); Gobius pappenheimi C. G. E. Ahl, 1925

= Porogobius =

Species of fish

Porogobius schlegelii is a species of goby native to brackish and fresh waters (occasionally entering marine waters) along the Atlantic coast of Africa from Senegal to the Democratic Republic of the Congo. It is also found in the islands of the Gulf of Guinea and Cape Verde. It occurs in inshore waters in lagoons, estuaries, the lower reaches of rivers and mangrove swamps. This species grows to a length of 14.9 centimetres (5.9 in) TL. This species is the only known member of its genus. The specific name honours the ichthyologist Hermann Schlegel (1804-1884) who supplied Günther with the type specimen from the Natural History Museum in Leiden.
