= Splitbanded goby =

Conservation status
- Least Concern (IUCN 3.1)

Scientific classification
- Kingdom: Animalia
- Phylum: Chordata
- Class: Actinopterygii
- Order: Gobiiformes
- Family: Gobiidae
- Genus: Gymneleotris; Bleeker, 1874
- Species: G. seminuda

Binomial name
- Gymneleotris seminuda (Günther, 1864)

Synonyms
- Eleotris seminudus Günther, 1864; Gymneleotris seminudus (Günther, 1864)

Species of fish

The splitbanded goby (Gymneleotris seminuda) is a species of goby from the family Gobiidae which is native to the Pacific coast of the Americas from Baja California to Ecuador. This species can be found on rock or rubble reefs with growths of algae at a depth of from 1 to 23 metres (3.3 to 75.5 ft). This species grows to a length of 5 centimetres (2.0 in) TL. This species is the only known member of its genus.
