= Feia =

Scientific classification
- Kingdom: Animalia
- Phylum: Chordata
- Class: Actinopterygii
- Order: Gobiiformes
- Family: Gobiidae
- Genus: Feia; J. L. B. Smith, 1959

Type species
- Feia nympha J. L. B. Smith, 1959

Genus of fishes

Feia is a genus of gobies native to shallow coastal waters of the Indian Ocean and the western Pacific Ocean.

== Species ==
These are the currently recognized species in this genus:

- Feia dabra R. Winterbottom, 2005 (Dabra goby)
- Feia nota A. C. Gill & Mooi, 1999
- Feia nympha J. L. B. Smith, 1959 (Nymph goby)
- Feia ranta R. Winterbottom, 2003 (Ranta Goby)
- Feia seba G. R. Allen, Erdmann & Book, 2020
