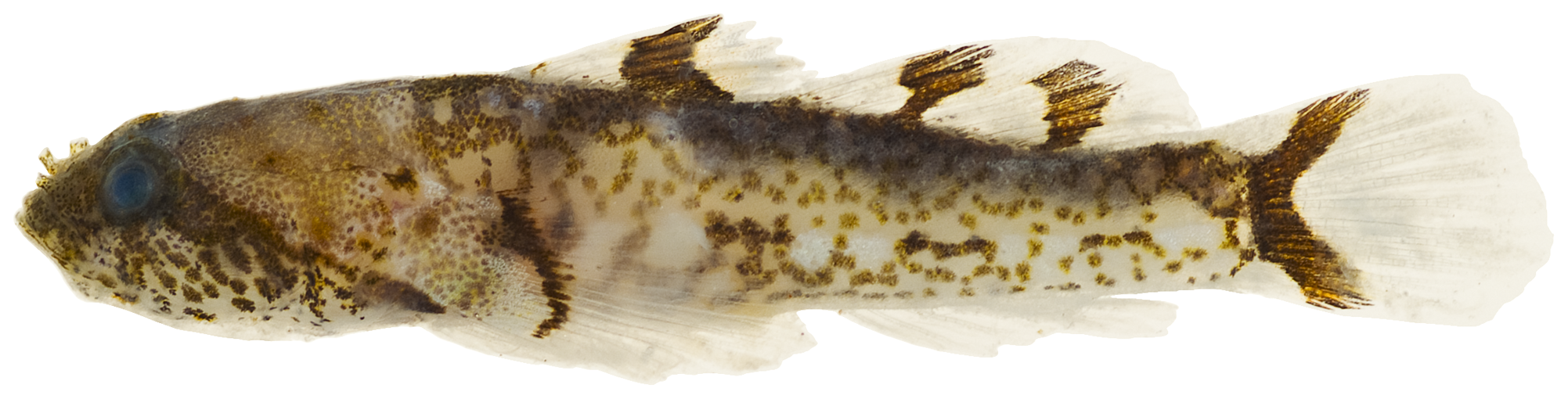
- Psilotris batrachodes

Scientific classification
- Kingdom: Animalia
- Phylum: Chordata
- Class: Actinopterygii
- Order: Gobiiformes
- Family: Gobiidae
- Genus: Psilotris; Ginsburg, 1953

Type species
- Psilotris alepis Ginsburg, 1953

= Psilotris =

Genus of fishes

Psilotris is a genus of gobies native to the western Atlantic Ocean.

== Species ==
There are six recognized species in this genus:

- Psilotris alepis Ginsburg, 1953 (Scaleless goby)
- Psilotris amblyrhynchus D. G. Smith & C. C. Baldwin, 1999
- Psilotris batrachodes J. E. Böhlke, 1963 (Toadfish goby)
- Psilotris boehlkei D. W. Greenfield, 1993
- Psilotris celsa J. E. Böhlke, 1963 (Highspine goby)
- Psilotris kaufmani D. W. Greenfield, Findley & R. K. Johnson, 1993
