= List of Gobiidae genera =

This is a complete list of genera in the fish family Gobiidae, in accordance to the 5th edition of Fishes of the World.

== List ==
- Aboma
- Acentrogobius
- Afurcagobius
- Aioliops
- Akko
- Amblyeleotris
- Amblygobius
- Amoya
- Anatirostrum
- Ancistrogobius
- Antilligobius
- Aphia
- Arcygobius
- Arenigobius
- Aruma
- Asterropteryx
- Aulopareia
- Austrolethops
- Awaouichthys
- Babka
- Barbulifer
- Barbuligobius
- Bathygobius
- Benthophiloides
- Benthophilus
- Bollmannia
- Bryaninops
- Buenia
- Cabillus
- Caffrogobius
- Callogobius
- Caspiosoma
- Chriolepis
- Chromogobius
- Cerdale
- Clarkichthys
- Corcyrogobius
- Coryogalops
- Coryphopterus
- Cristatogobius
- Croilia
- Cryptocentroides
- Cryptocentrus
- Crystallogobius
- Cryptopsilotris
- Ctenogobiops
- Deltentosteus
- Didogobius
- Discordipinna
- Dotsugobius
- Drombus
- Ebomegobius
- Echinogobius
- Economidichthys
- Egglestonichthys
- Ego
- Elacatinus
- Eleotrica
- Evermannia
- Eviota
- Exyrias
- Favonigobius
- Feia
- Fusigobius
- Gammogobius
- Ginsburgellus
- Gladiogobius
- Glossogobius
- Gobiodon
- Gobiopsis
- Gobiosoma
- Gobitrichinotus
- Gobius
- Gobiusculus
- Gobulus
- Gorogobius
- Grallenia
- Gunnellichthys
- Gymneleotris
- Hazeus
- Hetereleotris
- Heterogobius
- Heteroplopomus
- Hyrcanogobius
- Istigobius
- Kelloggella
- Knipowitschia
- Koumansetta
- Kraemeria
- Larsonella
- Lebetus
- Lesueurigobius
- Lobulogobius
- Lophiogobius
- Lophogobius
- Lotilia
- Lubricogobius
- Luposicya
- Lythrypnus
- Macrodontogobius
- Mahidolia
- Mangarinus
- Mauligobius
- Mesogobius
- Microdesmus
- Microgobius
- Minysicya
- Myersina
- Navigobius
- Nemateleotris
- Nematogobius
- Neogobius
- Nes
- Nesogobius
- Obliquogobius
- Odondebuenia
- Ophiogobius
- Oplopomops
- Oplopomus
- Opua
- Oxymetopon
- Padogobius
- Palatogobius
- Palutrus
- Parachaeturichthys
- Paragunnellichthys
- Paragobiodon
- Paratrimma
- Pariah
- Parioglossus
- Parkraemeria
- Parrella
- Pascua
- Phoxacromion
- Phyllogobius
- Platygobiopsis
- Pleurosicya
- Polyspondylogobius
- Pomatoschistus
- Ponticola
- Porogobius
- Priolepis
- Proterorhinus
- Psammogobius
- Pseudaphya
- Psilogobius
- Psilotris
- Ptereleotris
- Pterocerdale
- Pycnomma
- Rhinogobiops
- Risor
- Robinsichthys
- Schindleria
- Signigobius
- Silhouettea
- Siphonogobius
- Speleogobius
- Stonogobiops
- Sueviota
- Sufflogobius
- Tasmanogobius
- Thorogobius
- Tigrigobius
- Tomiyamichthys
- Trimma
- Trimmatom
- Tryssogobius
- Valenciennea
- Vanderhorstia
- Vanneaugobius
- Varicus
- Vomerogobius
- Wheelerigobius
- Yoga
- Yongeichthys
- Zagadkogobius
- Zebrus
- Zosterisessor

=== Fossil genera ===
- †Brassoichthys Schwarzhans & Aguilera, 2024
- †Cubaguanichthys Schwarzhans & Aguilera, 2024
- †Globogobius Bratishko, Schwarzhans & Vernyhorova, 2023
- †Hesperichthys Schwarzhans, Ahnelt, Carnevale & Japundžić, 2016
- †Katyagobius Reichenbacher & Bannikov, 2021
- †Klincigobius Bradić-Milinović, Ahnelt & Schwarzhans, 2019
- †Medoborichthys Schwarzhans, Klots, Ryabokon & Kovalchuk, 2022
- †Moldavigobius Reichenbacher & Bannikov, 2022
- †Oniketia Marrama, Guisberti & Carnevale, 2022
- ?†Ortugobius Schwarzhans, Ohe & Ando, 2017
- †Parenypnias Schwarzhans, Klots, Ryabokon & Kovalchuk, 2022
- †Pontogobius Bratishko, Schwarzhans & Vernyhorova, 2023
- †Proneogobius Schwarzhans, Ahnelt, Carnevale & Japundžić, 2016
- †Proparella Schwarzhans & Aguilera, 2024
- †Protobenthophilus Schwarzhans, Ahnelt, Carnevale & Japundžić, 2016
- †Pseudolesueurigobius Reichenbacher & Bannikov, 2021
- †Rhamphogobius Bradić-Milinović, Ahnelt & Schwarzhans, 2019
- †Sarmatigobius Reichenbacher & Bannikov, 2021
- †Scythogobius Schwarzhans, Bratishko & Vernyhorova, 2023
- †Toxopyge Bradić-Milinović, Ahnelt & Schwarzhans, 2019
- †Weilerigobius Schwarzhans, 2017
- †Yarigobius Reichenbacher & Bannikov, 2021
