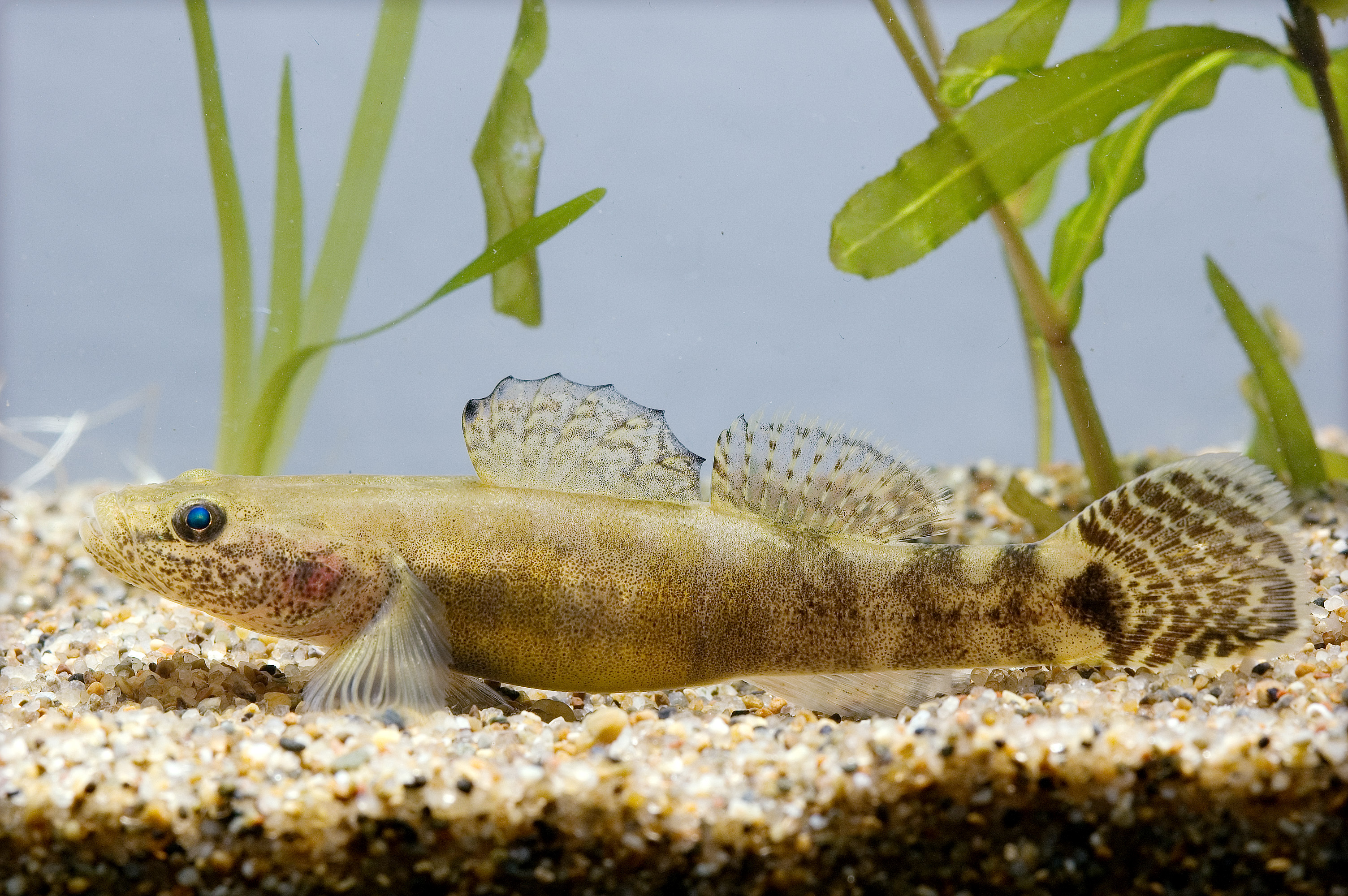
- Gymnogobius petschiliensis

Scientific classification
- Kingdom: Animalia
- Phylum: Chordata
- Class: Actinopterygii
- Division: Teleostei
- Order: Gobiiformes
- Family: Oxudercidae
- Subfamily: Gobionellinae; Bleeker, 1874

= Gobionellinae =

Gobionellinae Temporal range: Middle Miocene to present

Subfamily of fishes

The Gobionellinae are a subfamily of fish which was formerly classified in the family Gobiidae, the gobies, but the 5th Edition of Fishes of the World classifies the subfamily as part of the family Oxudercidae. Members of Gobionellinae mostly inhabit estuarine and freshwater habitats; the main exception is the genus Gnatholepis, which live with corals in marine environments. The subfamily is distributed in tropical and temperate regions around the world with the exception of the northeastern Atlantic Ocean, the Mediterranean Sea, and the Ponto-Caspian region.

Fossil records are known from the Middle Miocene of Europe.

It includes around 542 species and 76 genera:

== Genera ==
- Acanthogobius Gill, 1869
- Amblychaeturichthys Bleeker, 1874
- Astrabe Jordan & Snyder, 1901
- Awaouichthys Chatterjee & Mishra, 2013
- Awaous Valenciennes, 1837
- Brachygobius Bleeker, 1874
- Buenia Iljin, 1930
- Caecogobius Berti & Ercolini 1991
- Chaenogobius Gill, 1859
- Chaeturichthys Richardson, 1844
- Chlamydogobius Whitley, 1930
- Clariger Jordan & Snyder, 1901
- Clevelandia C. H. Eigenmann & Eigenmann, 1888
- Crystallogobius Gill, 1863
- Ctenogobius Gill, 1858
- Deltentosteus Gill, 1863
- Economidichthys Bianco, Bullock, Miller & Roubal, 1987
- Eucyclogobius Gill, 1862
- Eugnathogobius H.M. Smith, 1931
- Eutaeniichthys Jordan & Snyder, 1901
- Evermannia Jordan, 1895
- Evorthodus Gill, 1859
- Gillichthys Cooper, 1864
- Gnatholepis Bleeker, 1874
- Gobioides Lacépède, 1800
- Gobionellus Girard, 1858
- Gobiopterus Bleeker, 1874
- Gymnogobius Gill, 1863
- Hemigobius Bleeker, 1874
- Hyrcanogobius Iljin, 1928
- Ilogton Endruweit, 2024
- Ilypnus Jordan & Evermann, 1896
- Inu Snyder, 1909
- Knipowitschia Iljin, 1927
- Lebetus Winther, 1877
- Lepidogobius Gill, 1859
- Lethops Hubbs, 1926
- Leucopsarion Hilgendorf, 1880
- Luciogobius Gill, 1859
- Mistichthys H.M. Smith, 1902
- Mugilogobius Smitt, 1900
- Nesogobius Whitley, 1929
- Ninnigobius Whitley, 1951
- Oligolepis Bleeker, 1874
- Orsinigobius Gandolfi, Marconato & Torricelli, 1986
- Oxyurichthys Bleeker, 1857
- Paedogobius Iwata, S. Hosoya & Larson, 2001
- Pandaka Herre, 1927
- Papuligobius I. S. Chen & Kottelat, 2003
- Paragobiopsis Koumans, 1941
- Parawaous Watson, 1993
- Polyspondylogobius Kimura & Wu, 1994
- Pomatoschistus Gill, 1863
- Pseudaphya Iljin, 1930
- Pseudogobiopsis Bleeker, 1875
- Pseudogobius Popta, 1922
- Pterogobius Gill, 1863
- Quietula Jordan & Evermann, 1895
- Redigobius Herre, 1927
- Reptiliceps Prokofiev, 2007
- Rhinogobius Gill, 1859
- Sagamia Jordan & Snyder, 1901
- Schismatogobius de Beaufort, 1912
- Siphonogobius Shibukawa & Iwata, 1998
- Speleogobius Zander & Jelinek, 1976
- Stenogobius Bleeker, 1874
- Stigmatogobius Bleeker, 1874
- Suruga Jordan & Snyder, 1901
- Tamanka Herre, 1927
- Tasmanogobius Scott, 1935
- Tomiyamia Endruweit, 2024
- Triaenopogon Bleeker, 1874
- Tridentiger Gill, 1859
- Typhlogobius Steindachner, 1879
- Wuhanlinigobius Huang, Jaafar & Chen, 2014

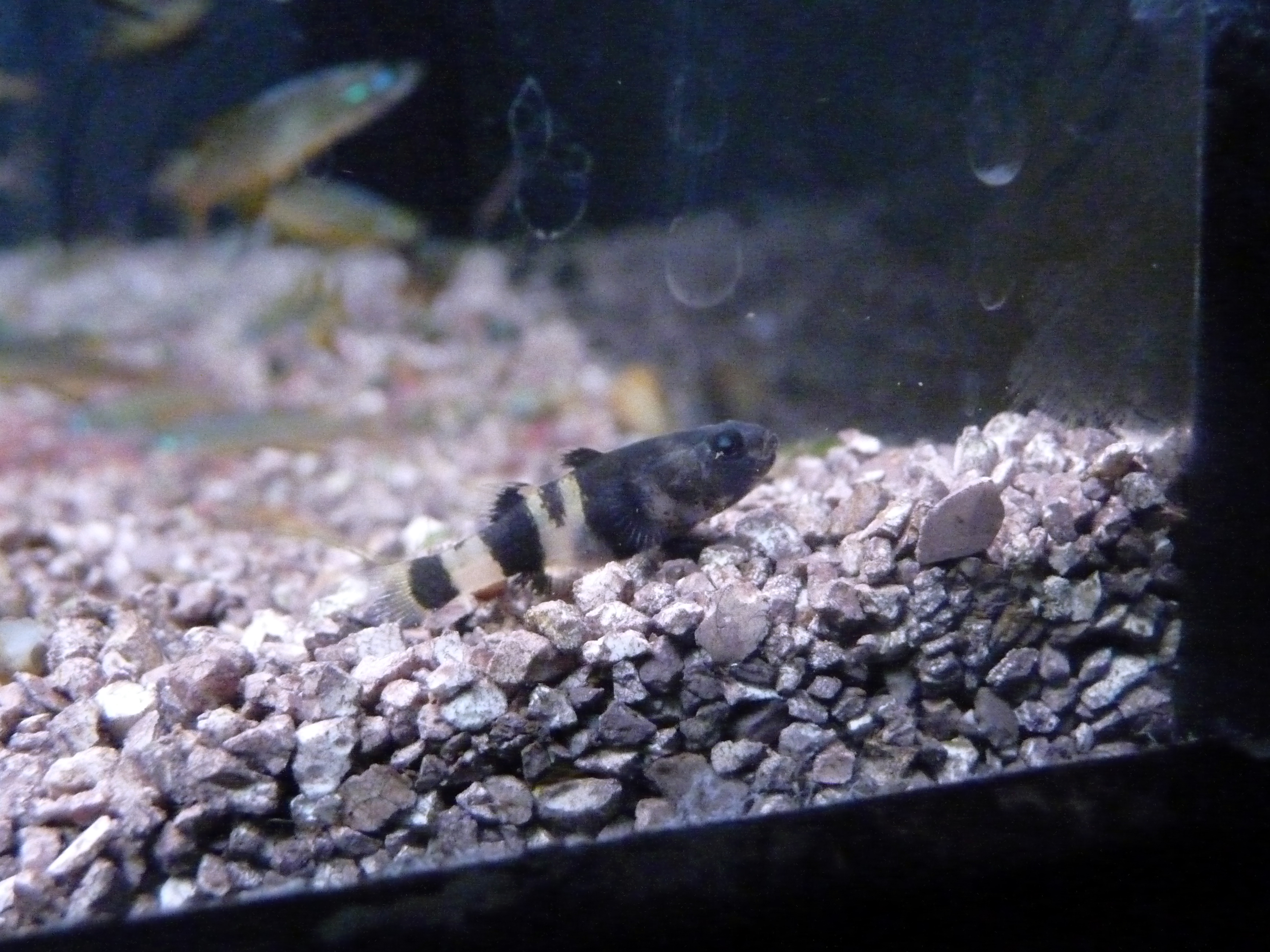
Brachygobius xanthozonus

The following fossil genera are also known:

- †Alienagobius Reichenbacher & Bannikov, 2025 (Middle Miocene of Moldova)
- †Cryptograciles Reichenbacher & Bannikov, 2025 (Middle Miocene of Moldova)
- †Hesperichthys Schwarzhans et al., 2017 (Middle Miocene of central and eastern Europe)
