= Caecogobius =

Scientific classification
- Kingdom: Animalia
- Phylum: Chordata
- Class: Actinopterygii
- Order: Gobiiformes
- Family: Oxudercidae
- Subfamily: Gobionellinae
- Genus: Caecogobius; Berti & Ercolini, 1991

Genus of fishes

Caecogobius is a genus of gobies native to cave systems in the Philippines.

== Species ==
There are currently two recognized species in this genus:

- Caecogobius cryptophthalmus Berti & Ercolini, 1991
- Caecogobius personatus Larson & Husana, 2018
