= Synechogobius =

Scientific classification
- Kingdom: Animalia
- Phylum: Chordata
- Class: Actinopterygii
- Order: Gobiiformes
- Family: Oxudercidae
- Subfamily: Gobionellinae
- Genus: Synechogobius; T. N. Gill, 1863

Synonyms
- Gobius ommaturus Richardson, 1845; Acanthogobius ommaturus (Richardson, 1845)

Genus of fishes

Synechogobius is a monotypic genus of fish in the goby subfamily, Gobionellinae, its only species is the Asian freshwater goby Synechogobius ommaturus which is found in fresh, marine and brackish waters along the Pacific coast of China. The javelin goby Acanthogobius hasta, an edible species of commercial importance from Japan, was previously classified in this genus.
