= Papuligobius uniporus =

Conservation status
- Data Deficient (IUCN 3.1)

Scientific classification
- Kingdom: Animalia
- Phylum: Chordata
- Class: Actinopterygii
- Order: Gobiiformes
- Family: Oxudercidae
- Genus: Papuligobius
- Species: P. uniporus

Binomial name
- Papuligobius uniporus Chen & Kottelat, 2003

Species of fish

Papuligobius uniporus is a species of small goby in the subfamily Gobionellinae. It is also the type species of the genus Papuligobius.

== Description ==
Males of this species can reach up to 6.5 cm in total length. Their vertebral column generally contains 26 individual vertebrae. P. uniporus has a dorsal fin with 7 spines, but 9–10 soft rays. Similarly, the anal fin has only one spine, but 8 to 9 soft rays. The pectoral fins commonly have 18–19 soft rays, the base of which has 3 vertically arranged white spots, though the caudal fin (and other fins) are plain.

P. uniporus, together with P. ocellatus, appear most similar to the genera Rhinogobius and Tridentiger, and may share an evolutionary origin with these other groups of gobies.

== Distribution and habitat ==
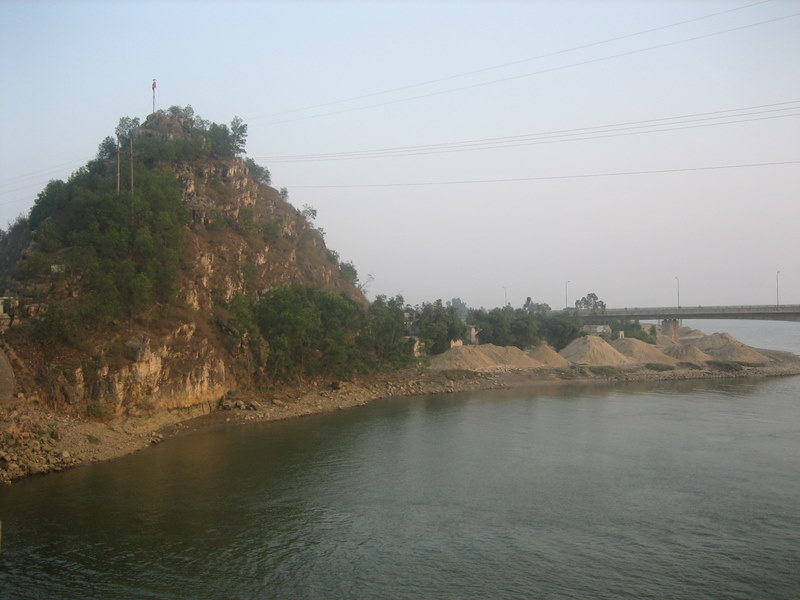
Mã River in Thanh Hóa city, Vietnam

Endemic to Southeast Asia, this species has been historically reported in the Ma River (Laos), though it is also probably found in Vietnam.

This species lives in tropical freshwater systems. It is also demersal: preferring to live near the bottom of wetlands in the Ma River basin. It is also known to inhabit small streams: preferring rocky substrate in clear, shallow, fast flowing channels.

== Conservation ==
P. uniporus is considered 'Data Deficient' by the IUCN. It is not currently known whether it faces any major threats, nor weather its population is stable. While P. uniporus is not protected by name in any laws, it is found in protected areas such as Vietnam's Phong Nha-Kẻ Bàng National Park.

== See also ==
- List of data deficient fishes
