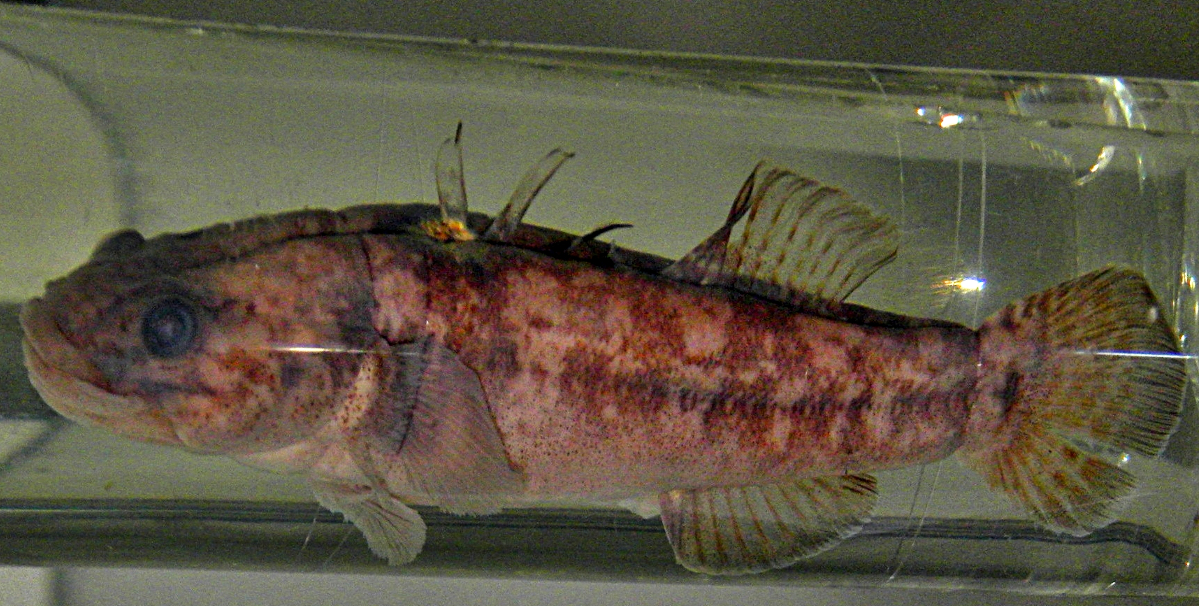

Conservation status
- Least Concern (IUCN 3.1)

Scientific classification
- Domain: Eukaryota
- Kingdom: Animalia
- Phylum: Chordata
- Class: Actinopterygii
- Order: Gobiiformes
- Family: Oxudercidae
- Genus: Chaenogobius
- Species: C. annularis

Binomial name
- Chaenogobius annularis Gill, 1859

Synonyms
- Gobius dolichognathus Hilgendorf, 1879; Chaenogobius dolichognathus (Hilgendorf, 1879); Chasmichthys dolichognathus (Hilgendorf, 1879)

= Chaenogobius annularis =

Species of fish

Chaenogobius annularis, the fork-tongued goby, is a species of goby from the subfamily Gobionellinae which is found in the brackish waters of temperate eastern Asia. It is the type species of the genus Chaenogobius.

== Description ==
Chaenogobius annularis has a light brown head and body with six, or so, broad vertical bands along the body and with several small, dusky spots and a distinct blotch on the caudal peduncle. The dorsal fins are light brown with darker, sinuous horizontal bands while the caudal and pectoral fins are also light brown but are marked with darker vertical bands. It grows to a maximum total length of 16 centimetres (6.3 in).

== Distribution ==
Chaenogobius annularis occurs in temperate eastern Asia including Russia, China and the Korean Peninsula as well as the islands of Japan, the Kuril Islands and Sakhalin.

== Habitat and biology ==
Chaenogobius annularis is a species of brackish water where it has a demersal habit. It occurs along intertidal rocky shores and in rock pools and it is one of the commonest intertidal fish species in the temperate coastlines of the Japanese Archipelago.

== Conservation ==
As it has a large distribution and there are no threats to this species known, the IUCN have assessed C. annularis as Least Concern.

== Etymology ==
The generic name Chaenogobius is a compound of the Greek chaeno meaning "gape" and gobius or goby while the specific name annularis is Latin meaning "ringed", referring to the transverse bands on its body.
