= Hemigobius =

- banded mulletgoby Hemigobius hoevenii

Scientific classification
- Kingdom: Animalia
- Phylum: Chordata
- Class: Actinopterygii
- Order: Gobiiformes
- Family: Oxudercidae
- Subfamily: Gobionellinae
- Genus: Hemigobius; Bleeker, 1874

Type species
- Gobius melanurus Bleeker, 1849

Synonyms
- Microgobius Bleeker, 1931; Sphenentogobius Fowler, 1940

Genus of fishes

Hemigobius is a genus of gobies native to the western Pacific Ocean.

== Species ==
There are currently four recognized species in this genus:

- Hemigobius crassus (Herre, 1945)
- Hemigobius hoevenii (Bleeker, 1851)
- Hemigobius melanurus (Bleeker, 1849)
- Hemigobius mingi (Herre, 1936)
