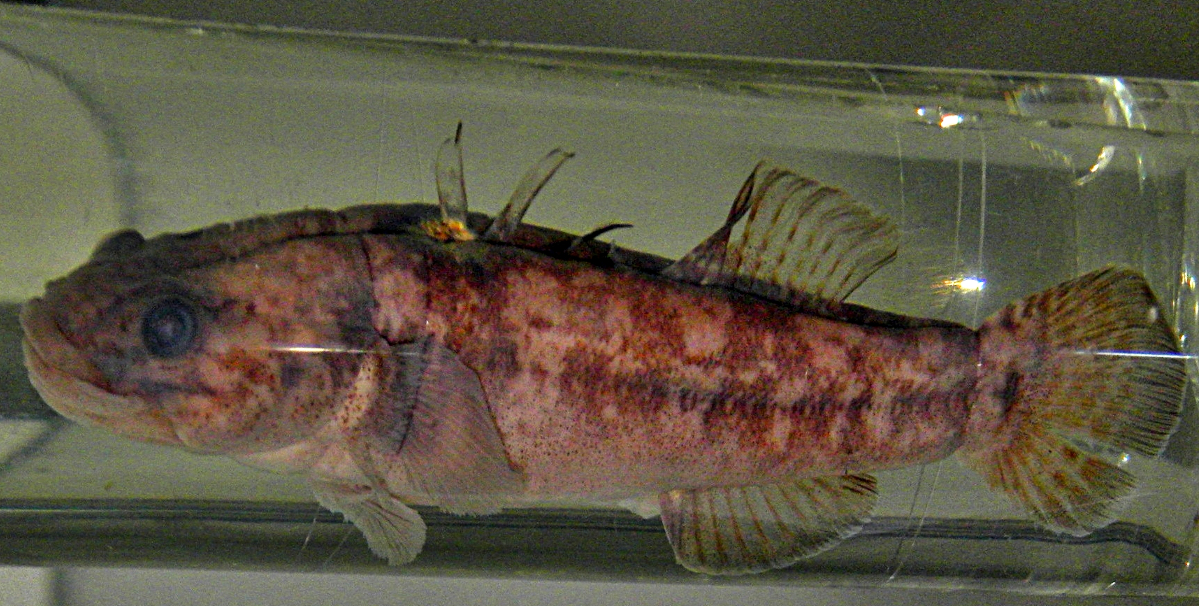
- Chaenogobius annularis

Scientific classification
- Kingdom: Animalia
- Phylum: Chordata
- Class: Actinopterygii
- Order: Gobiiformes
- Family: Oxudercidae
- Subfamily: Gobionellinae
- Genus: Chaenogobius; T. N. Gill, 1859

Type species
- Chaenogobius annularis T. N. Gill, 1859

Synonyms
- Chasmias D. S. Jordan & Snyder, 1901; Chasmichthys D. S. Jordan & Snyder, 1901; Saccostoma Sauvage, 1882

= Chaenogobius =

Genus of fishes

Chaenogobius is a genus of gobies native to Asia and the western Pacific Ocean.

== Species ==
There are currently two recognized species in this genus:

- Chaenogobius annularis T. N. Gill, 1859 (Forktongue goby)
- Chaenogobius gulosus (Sauvage, 1882)
