= Papuligobius =

Scientific classification
- Kingdom: Animalia
- Phylum: Chordata
- Class: Actinopterygii
- Order: Gobiiformes
- Family: Oxudercidae
- Subfamily: Gobionellinae
- Genus: Papuligobius; I. S. Chen & Kottelat, 2003

Type species
- Papuligobius uniporus I. S. Chen & Kottelat, 2003

Genus of fishes

Papuligobius is a genus of fish in the goby subfamily, Gobionellinae, native to Southeast Asia. It was erected in 2003 to house the species P. uniporus, newly described from Laos. A second species, P. ocellatus, was transferred from genus Rhinogobius at the same time.

== Species ==
The genus includes:

- Papuligobius ocellatus (Fowler, 1937)
- Papuligobius uniporus I. S. Chen & Kottelat, 2003
