= Ninnigobius =

Scientific classification
- Kingdom: Animalia
- Phylum: Chordata
- Class: Actinopterygii
- Order: Gobiiformes
- Family: Oxudercidae
- Subfamily: Gobionellinae
- Genus: Ninnigobius; Whitley, 1951

Synonyms
- Ninnia de Buen, 1930

Genus of fishes

Ninnigobius is a genus of gobies native to Southern and Southeastern Europe.

== Species ==
There are currently two recognized species in this genus:

- Ninnigobius canestrinii Ninni, 1883 (Canestrini's goby)
- Ninnigobius montenegrensis (P. J. Miller & Šanda, 2008)
