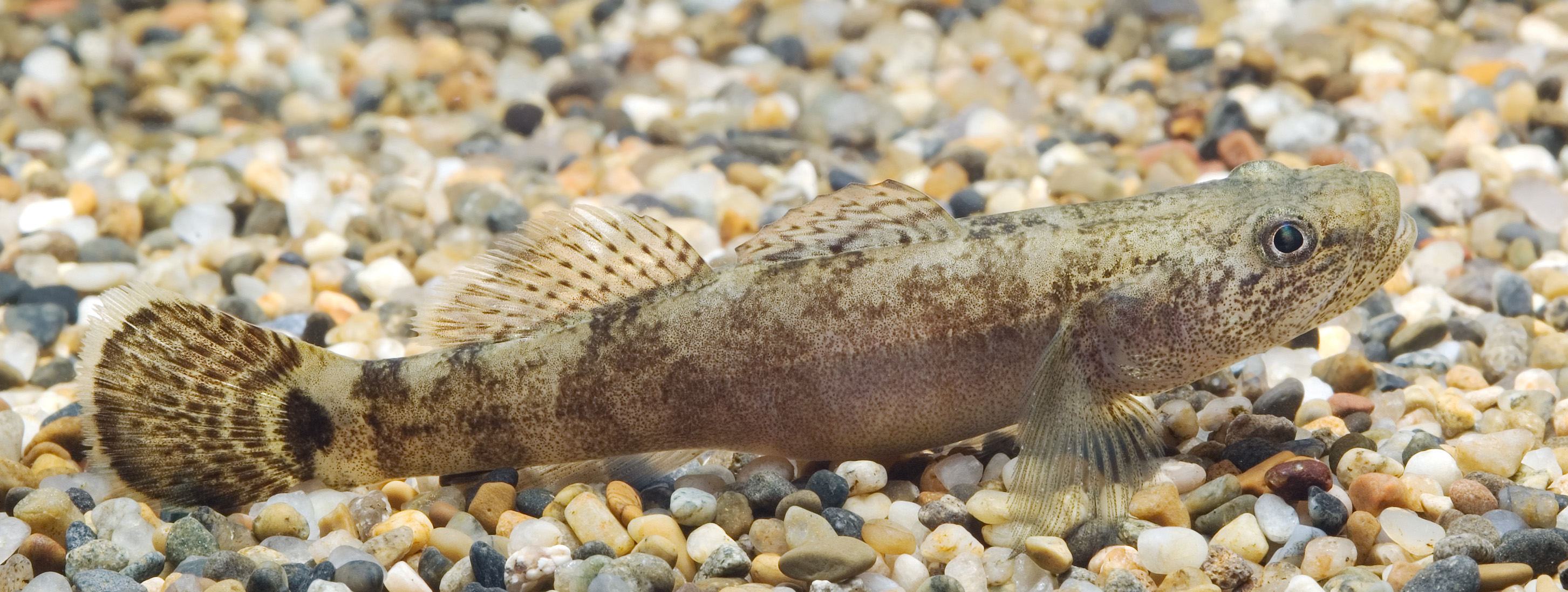
- Gymnogobius petschiliensis

Scientific classification
- Kingdom: Animalia
- Phylum: Chordata
- Class: Actinopterygii
- Order: Gobiiformes
- Family: Oxudercidae
- Subfamily: Gobionellinae
- Genus: Gymnogobius; T. N. Gill, 1863

Type species
- Gobius macrognathos Bleeker, 1860

Synonyms
- Chloea D. S. Jordan & Snyder, 1901; Chloeichthys Whitley, 1940; Lindbergiana Pinchuk, 1978; Paleatogobius Takagi, 1957; Rhodoniichthys Takagi, 1966; Taranetziola Shedko & Chereshnev, 2005

= Gymnogobius =

Genus of fishes

Gymnogobius is a genus of gobies found in marine, brackish and fresh waters of Asia and the western Pacific Ocean.

== Species ==
There are currently 17 recognized species in this genus:

- Gymnogobius breunigii (Steindachner, 1879)
- Gymnogobius castaneus (O'Shaughnessy, 1875) (Biringo)
- Gymnogobius cylindricus (Tomiyama, 1936)
- Gymnogobius heptacanthus (Hilgendorf, 1879)
- Gymnogobius isaza (S. Tanaka, 1916)
- Gymnogobius macrognathos (Bleeker, 1860)
- Gymnogobius mororanus (D. S. Jordan & Snyder, 1901)
- Gymnogobius nakamurae (Jordan & Richardson, 1907)
- Gymnogobius nigrimembranis (H. W. Wu & Ki. Fu. Wang, 1931)
- Gymnogobius opperiens D. E. Stevenson, 2002
- Gymnogobius petschiliensis (Rendahl, 1924)
- Gymnogobius scrobiculatus (Takagi, 1957)
- Gymnogobius taranetzi (Pinchuk, 1978)
- Gymnogobius transversefasciatus (H. L. Wu & Z. M. Zhou, 1990)
- Gymnogobius uchidai (Takagi, 1957)
- Gymnogobius urotaenia (Hilgendorf, 1879)
- Gymnogobius zhoushanensis S. L. Zhao, H. L. Wu & J. S. Zhong, 2007
