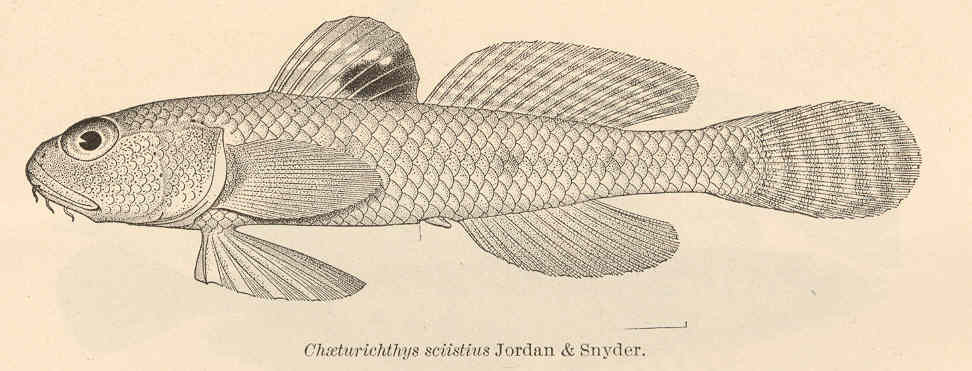
- Amblychaeturichthys sciistius

Scientific classification
- Kingdom: Animalia
- Phylum: Chordata
- Class: Actinopterygii
- Order: Gobiiformes
- Family: Oxudercidae
- Subfamily: Gobionellinae
- Genus: Amblychaeturichthys; Bleeker, 1874

Type species
- Chaeturichthys hexanema Bleeker, 1853

= Amblychaeturichthys =

Genus of fishes

Amblychaeturichthys is a small genus of gobies native to the northwestern Pacific Ocean.

== Species ==
There are currently two recognized species in this genus:

- Amblychaeturichthys hexanema (Bleeker, 1853)
- Amblychaeturichthys sciistius (D. S. Jordan & Snyder, 1901)
