= Tamanka siitensis =

Conservation status
- Endangered (IUCN 3.1)

Scientific classification
- Kingdom: Animalia
- Phylum: Chordata
- Class: Actinopterygii
- Order: Gobiiformes
- Family: Oxudercidae
- Subfamily: Gobionellinae
- Genus: Tamanka
- Species: T. siitensis

Binomial name
- Tamanka siitensis Herre, 1927

Species of fish

Tamanka siitensis is a species of fish in the goby family, Gobiidae, and the only member of the monotypic genus Tamanka. It is endemic to Jolo Island in the Sulu Archipelago of the Philippines. It is a freshwater fish that can be found in lakes near the coast. This species grows to a length of 6.5 centimetres (2.6 in) SL.
