= Suruga =

Suruga may refer to:

- Suruga Province, an old province in the central part of modern Shizuoka prefecture
- Suruga-ku, Shizuoka, a ward of Shizuoka City, Japan
- Suruga Bay, a bay on the Pacific coast of Honshū, Japan
- Suruga Trough, a trough off the coast of Suruga Bay
- 4383 Suruga, a main-belt asteroid
- Suruga fundicola, a species of fish in the goby family

== See also ==
- Tsuruga, a city in Fukui Prefecture, Japan
