= Ilypnus gilberti =

Conservation status
- Least Concern (IUCN 3.1)

Scientific classification
- Kingdom: Animalia
- Phylum: Chordata
- Class: Actinopterygii
- Division: Teleostei
- Order: Gobiiformes
- Family: Oxudercidae
- Genus: Ilypnus
- Species: I. gilberti

Binomial name
- Ilypnus gilberti (Eigenmann & Eigenmann, 1889)

Synonyms
- Lepidogobius gilberti Eigenmann & Eigenmann, 1889

Species of ray-finned fish

Ilypnus gilberti, the cheekspot goby, is a species of ray-finned fish. It is found in the waters of the United States and Mexico, along the coasts of California and Baja California, as well as the Gulf of California.
