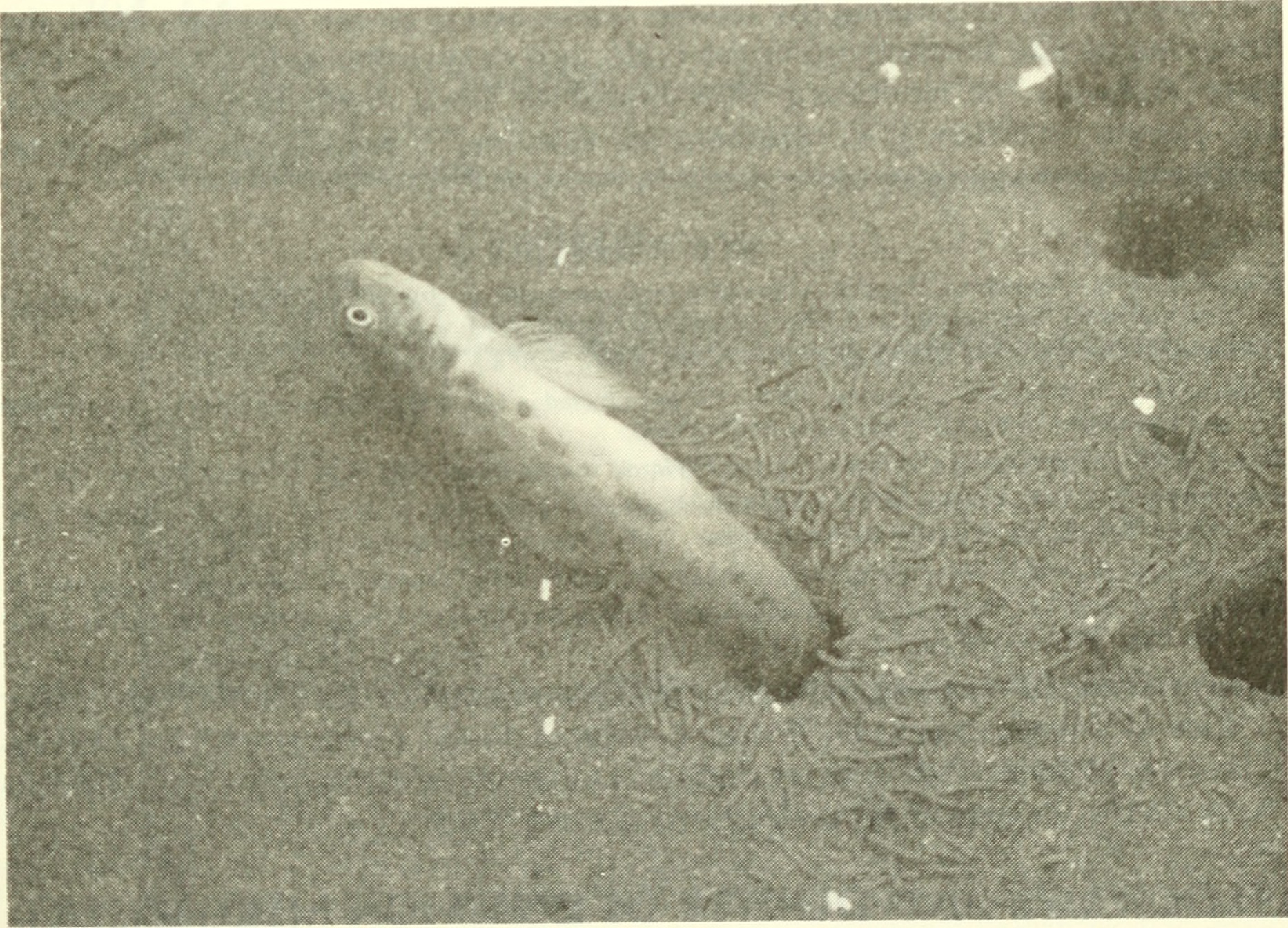

Conservation status
- Least Concern (IUCN 3.1)

Scientific classification
- Kingdom: Animalia
- Phylum: Chordata
- Class: Actinopterygii
- Division: Teleostei
- Order: Gobiiformes
- Family: Oxudercidae
- Subfamily: Gobionellinae
- Genus: Lepidogobius; T. N. Gill, 1859
- Species: L. lepidus

Binomial name
- Lepidogobius lepidus (Girard, 1858)

Synonyms
- Genus: Cyclogobius Steindachner, 1861; Species: Gobius lepidus Girard, 1858

= Bay goby =

Species of ray-finned fish

Lepidogobius lepidus, the bay goby or finescale goby, is a noticeably resilient and adaptable species of goby, native to the Pacific coast of North America from British Columbia, Canada to Baja California, Mexico where it can be found on muddy substrates from the intertidal zone to about 200 metres (660 ft). This species grows to a length of 10 centimetres (3.9 in) TL. This species is the only extant member of its genus, Lepidogobius. They can flourish in various kinds of habitats, including brackish waters that have fluctuating salinities. The bay goby has a flattened body, and a distinctive head shape which allows it to seamlessly blend into its surroundings. They appear to be light brown to tan in colour with dark spots or markings on its body. This type of goby fish also possesses a fused fin that forms a disc-like suction which aids in their ability to cling to surfaces and not get swept away by currents. These little fish play a crucial role in the food web of their ecosystems (biocontrol agents) as they are both predators of small crustaceans (feed on small invertebrates) and prey for large fish.

The bay goby is relatively resilient and exhibits remarkable adaptability, resulting in its status as "Least Concern" on the list of endangered species. Regardless, climate change, coastal development and pollution, serve as a threat like many marine species.

Members of this genus have been found in Pleistocene deposits.

== Taxonomy ==
Lepidogobius lepidus has been derived from the Greek word "lepido" meaning "scale", referring to the fish's smooth and slender body, while the epithet "lepidus" is Latin for "smooth" or "fine", referring to its streamlined shape which helps them with rapid movements through water.

== Mating practices ==
Male bay gobies engage in vibrant colour changes and intricate movements to attract females. Once courtship is successful, the female bay goby lays its eggs in small crevices or among vegetation. The male then fertilizes the eggs and displays protective behaviour by guarding them until they hatch.

== Social behaviour ==
Bay gobies generally enjoy solitude but can be in small groups especially in areas rich food sources. They are rather territorial beings and are often found defending their chosen spots from outsiders, more specifically during the foraging period. Their social behaviours are further highlighted during the mating period when they are trying to appeal to the female bay gobies.
