= Quietula =

Scientific classification
- Kingdom: Animalia
- Phylum: Chordata
- Class: Actinopterygii
- Order: Gobiiformes
- Family: Oxudercidae
- Subfamily: Gobionellinae
- Genus: Quietula; D. S. Jordan & Evermann, 1895

Type species
- Gillichthys y-cauda O. P. Jenkins & Evermann, 1889

Genus of fishes

Quietula is a genus of fish in the goby subfamily, Gobionellinae. There are two species, both native to the Gulf of California in Mexico. One is endemic to the Gulf, and the other also occurs along the western coast of Baja California and the coast of California. The fish were first described from Guaymas in Sonora, Mexico. The genus name Quietula is from the Latin quietus, meaning "quiet".

These gobies have elongated bodies and compressed heads with large eyes and large mouths, with the corner of the mouth located posterior to the eye. Most of the front end of the body is without scales. The caudal fin is rounded. Q. guaymasiae and Q. y-cauda can be distinguished by the shape of the dark spot on the caudal fin; the former has a transverse marking at the base of the fin, while the latter has a sideways y-shaped spot that extends forward onto the caudal peduncle. The two species are also distinguished by the number of rays in the pectoral fin, the number of scales, and the arrangement of neuromasts in the lateral line.

Species:

- Quietula guaymasiae (Jenkins & Evermann, 1889), the Guaymas goby, is endemic to the Gulf of California. It can be locally common in its estuary and lagoon habitat, but it may be threatened by coastal activity such as development and shrimp aquaculture.
- Quietula y-cauda (Jenkins & Evermann, 1889), the American shadow goby, occurs in sympatry with Q. guaymasiae in the northern Gulf. It also occurs on the western coast of Baja California, its range extending along the California coast as far north as Morro Bay. It lives at the mouths of rivers and on the mudflats of lagoons. It sometimes occupies worm or shrimp burrows. Males guard the eggs.
