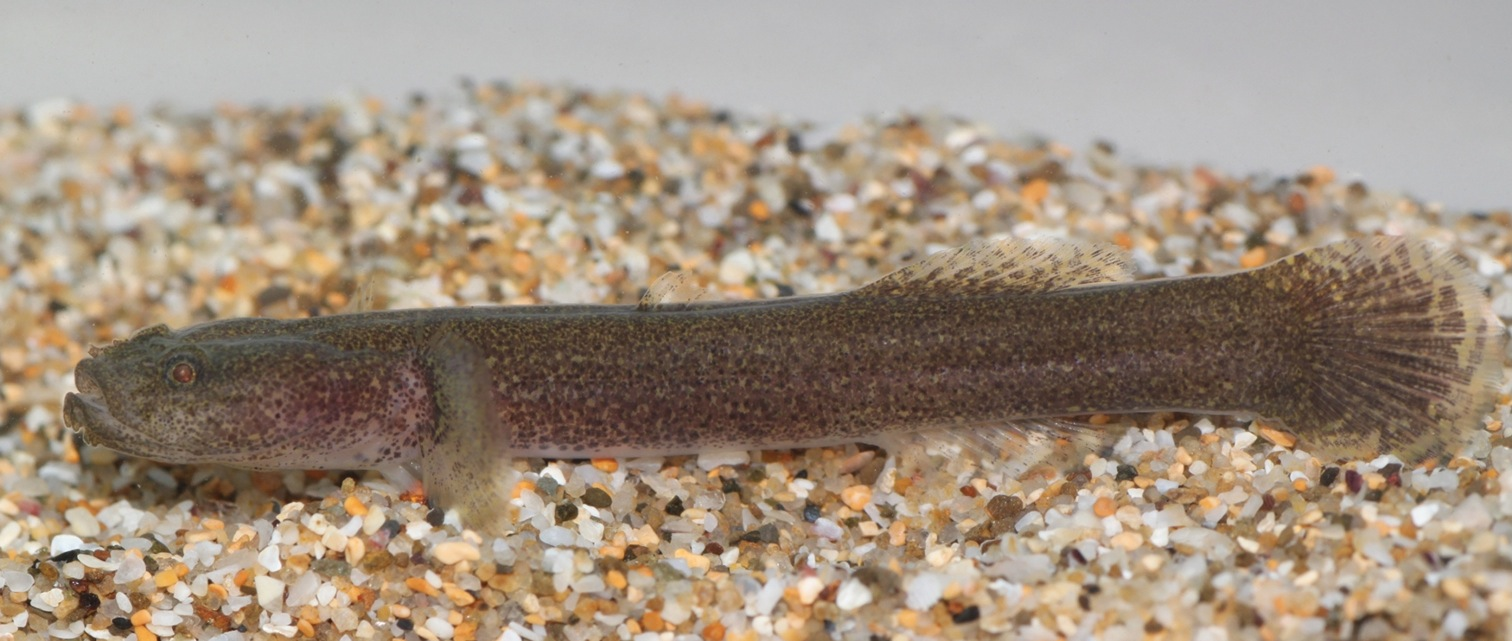
- C. taiwanensis

Scientific classification
- Kingdom: Animalia
- Phylum: Chordata
- Class: Actinopterygii
- Order: Gobiiformes
- Family: Oxudercidae
- Subfamily: Gobionellinae
- Genus: Clariger; D. S. Jordan & Snyder, 1901

Type species
- Clariger cosmurus D. S. Jordan & Snyder, 1901

= Clariger =

Genus of fishes

Clariger is a genus of gobies native to the northwestern Pacific Ocean from coastal waters and tide pools around Japan and Taiwan.

== Species ==
There are currently six recognized species in this genus:

- Clariger chionomaculatus Shiogaki, 1988
- Clariger cosmurus D. S. Jordan & Snyder, 1901
- Clariger exilis Snyder, 1911
- Clariger papillosus Ebina, 1935
- Clariger sirahamaensis Sakamoto, 1932
- Clariger taiwanensis Jang-Liaw, Y. H. Gong & I. S. Chen, 2012
