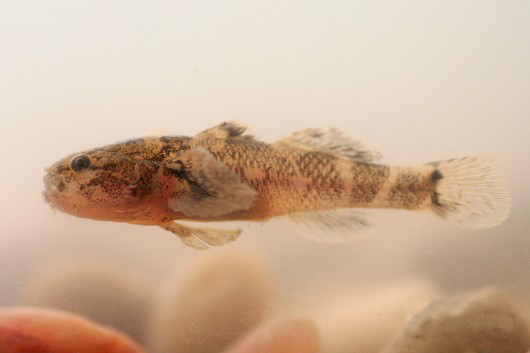

Conservation status
- Least Concern (IUCN 3.1)

Scientific classification
- Kingdom: Animalia
- Phylum: Chordata
- Class: Actinopterygii
- Order: Gobiiformes
- Family: Oxudercidae
- Genus: Triaenopogon
- Species: T. barbatus

Binomial name
- Triaenopogon barbatus (Günther, 1861)

Synonyms
- Triaenophorichthys barbatus Günther, 1861; Tridentiger barbatus (Günther, 1861)

= Shokihaze goby =

Species of fish

The Shokihaze goby (Triaenopogon barbatus) is a small fish species that bears a superficial resemblance to sculpins but can be distinguished by specific morphological features. One notable characteristic is the presence of fused pelvic fins, which form a suction cup, a feature not found in sculpins. Additionally, Shokihaze gobies have barbels on their heads, specifically below the eyes and along the lower jaw which help differentiate them from other similar species.

== Morphology ==
The Shokihaze goby can be further distinguished from other introduced species in the Tridentiger genus, such as the Shimofuri goby (T. bifasciatus) and the Chameleon goby (T. trigonocephalus). While the Shokihaze goby displays approximately six vertical or diagonal dusky bars along its body, the other two species feature dark horizontal stripes instead of bars. The presence of barbels is also unique to T. barbatus compared to its counterparts.

=== Typical size ===
This species can reach a length of 5.2 centimetres (2.0 in) SL. Juvenile and adult of the Shokihaze Goby have total length (TL) ranging from 13 to 121 mm (0.51 to 4.76 in).

== Geographical Range ==
Shokihaze goby is a species of goby native to marine and brackish waters along the coasts of eastern Asia, specifically it is native to China. It has also been introduced to the San Francisco Bay in California, United States. Both the State Water Project (SWP) and Central Valley Project (CVP) export water from the Sacramento-San Joaquin Delta. These water conveyance systems provide potential pathways for species dispersal into southern California. One notable example of this is the expansion of the shimofuri goby, which was facilitated by the State Water Project.

== Abdundance ==
In recent years, the catch rates of Triaenopogon barbatus within the San Francisco Bay Delta have surpassed the combined totals of the two Tridentiger species found in the region.

== Ecosystem & Habitat ==
Water temperature affects various physiological functions, including respiration, digestion, and overall metabolic rate. As the temperature of the water increases, the metabolic rate of fish generally accelerates, while cooler water temperatures can slow down these processes. Shokihaze gobies demonstrate a broad tolerance to various environmental conditions. They have been collected in water temperatures ranging from 7 to 22 °C (45 to 72 °F) and in salinities from less than 1 ppt to 29 ppt. Their adaptability to both fresh and brackish environments contributes to their survival in a range of aquatic habitats.

== Life span ==
This species is characterized by a relatively short lifespan, with individuals typically reaching sexual maturity within their first year of life. Spawning primarily occurs in brackish waters, with salinity levels ranging from 2 to 9 parts per thousand. The breeding season spans the spring and summer months, typically from April to August.

Male individuals of this species are responsible for constructing and guarding nests, which are typically situated on hard substrates. These nests are commonly found in locations such as empty oyster shells, rocks, jetties, and pilings. The males actively defend these nesting sites, ensuring protection from potential threats. This nesting behavior is vital for the species' reproductive success and has been observed in several studies.

The preference for brackish water environments during spawning suggests a level of adaptability to fluctuating salinity conditions. These breeding areas offer protection and suitable conditions for early development, which is crucial for the survival of the species in its coastal habitat.

Reproduction

Dôtu (1957) determined the spawning period by examining ripe gonads and observing nests containing eggs in the field. Ripe male gobies had testes that appeared as thick white organs, extending to one-quarter of the front abdomen. In females, two groups of eggs were observed in the ovary: a ripe group of yellow yolked spherical or elliptical eggs, measuring 0.48 to 0.90 mm in diameter, and an immature group of mostly transparent eggs less than 0.05 mm in diameter. The largest ripe female examined by Dôtu contained 23,365 eggs. Eggs found in nests were ellipsoidal, measuring between 1.46 to 1.60 mm on the major axis (averaging 1.54 mm) and 0.52 to 0.58 mm on the minor axis (averaging 0.55 mm). These eggs had adhesive filaments at the basal end, which helped them attach to substrates.

The number of spawning events per season for shokihaze gobies in Japan remains unclear. Dôtu observed that the ripe eggs within a group were nearly identical in development, suggesting that they were likely spawned simultaneously. However, it was not determined how many times a female spawned in a single season. Males were observed to be polygamous within the spawning area and were found in poor condition during the spawning season. Due to the extended duration of the spawning period, it is believed that males spawned multiple times throughout the season.

== Diet ==
Triaenopogon barbatus is a benthic species primarily feeding on invertebrates and small fish. Its diet mainly consists of benthic invertebrates such as polychaete worms and crustaceans, as well as small fishes. In California, the shokihaze goby's diet is more diverse, including gammarid amphipods, copepods, mysids, isopods, and clam siphons. Notably, it has been observed to consume polyps of the non-native hydrozoan Cordylophora caspia, which can make up to 10% of the total gut content weight during certain seasons.

== Conservation status ==
Unknown consequences for its introduction, but might prey on other native gobies or sculpins. The species is native to Japan and is currently classified as "Least Concern" according to conservation assessments.
