= Hemigobius mingi =

Scientific classification
- Domain: Eukaryota
- Kingdom: Animalia
- Phylum: Chordata
- Class: Actinopterygii
- Order: Gobiiformes
- Family: Oxudercidae
- Genus: Hemigobius
- Species: H. mingi

Binomial name
- Hemigobius mingi (Herre, 1936)

Synonyms
- Hemigobius mingi (Herre, 1936); Gnatholepis mingi Herre, 1936; Stigmatogobius mingi (Herre, 1936); Gobius melanurus Bleeker, 1849; Hemigobius melanurus (Bleeker, 1849); Sphenentogobius vanderbilti Fowler, 1940; Hemigobius bleekeri Koumans, 1953

Species of fish

Hemigobius mingi, commonly known as the banded goby, is a species of goby found in brackish and marine waters in the South-east Asia. The Catalog of Fishes treats Hemigobius mingi as a synonym of Hemigobius melanurus.
