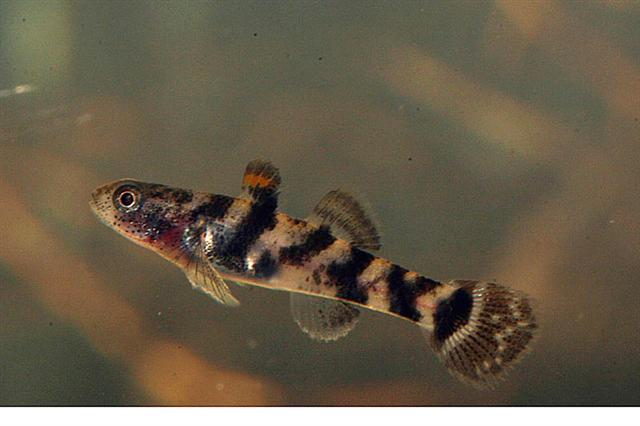

Scientific classification
- Kingdom: Animalia
- Phylum: Chordata
- Class: Actinopterygii
- Order: Gobiiformes
- Family: Oxudercidae
- Genus: Hemigobius
- Species: H. hoevenii

Binomial name
- Hemigobius hoevenii (Bleeker, 1851)

Synonyms
- Gobius hoevenii Bleeker, 1851; Microgobius hoevenii (Bleeker, 1851); Pseudogobius hoevenii (Bleeker, 1851); Stigmatogobius hoevenii (Bleeker, 1851); Vaisoma hoevenii (Bleeker, 1851); Vaimosa crassa Herre, 1945; Hemigobius crassa (Herre, 1945); Mugilogobius obliquifasciatus Wu & Ni, 1985; Mugilogobius obliquifasciata Wu & Ni, 1985

= Hemigobius hoevenii =

Species of fish

Hemigobius hoevenii, commonly known as the banded mulletgoby, is a species of goby which occurs in the western Indo-Pacific region from Thailand to New Guinea and northern Australia where it is found in mangroves. The specific name most likely honours the Dutch ichthyologist Jan van der Hoeven (1801-1868) who has been honoured by Pieter Bleeker in a number of names for taxa.
