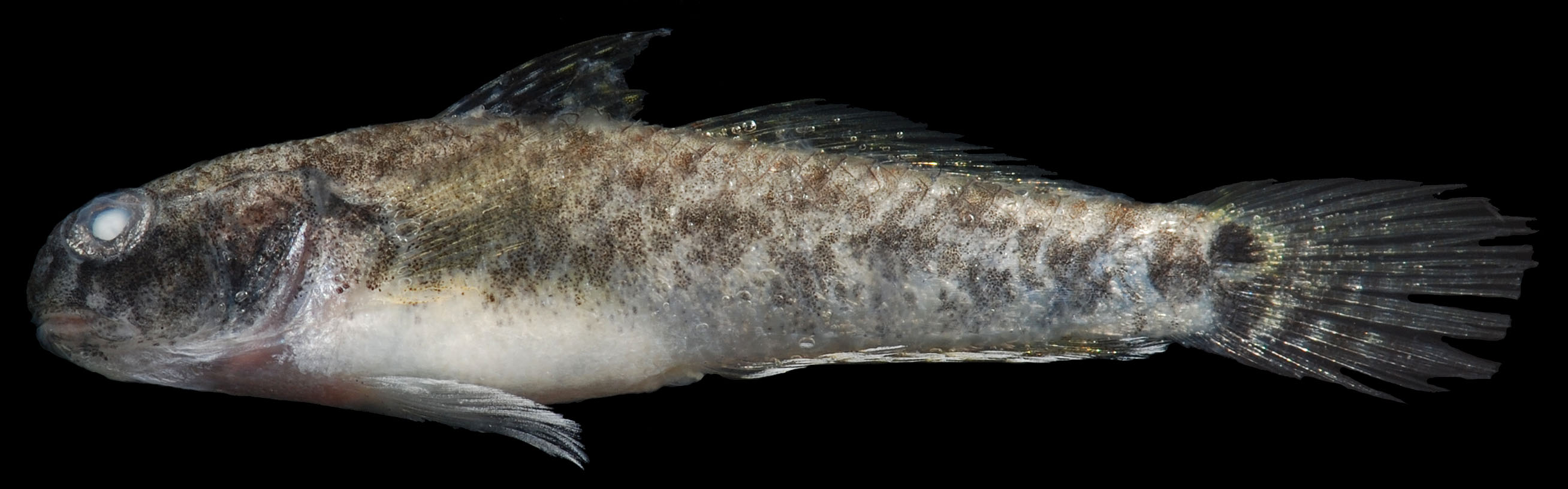
- Evorthodus lyricus

Scientific classification
- Kingdom: Animalia
- Phylum: Chordata
- Class: Actinopterygii
- Order: Gobiiformes
- Family: Oxudercidae
- Subfamily: Gobionellinae
- Genus: Evorthodus; T. N. Gill, 1859

Type species
- Evorthodus breviceps T. N. Gill, 1859

Synonyms
- Mugilostoma Hildebrand, & Schroeder, 1928

= Evorthodus =

Genus of fishes

Evorthodus is a genus of gobies native to the Atlantic coast from Chesapeake Bay, United States, to northern South America and along the Pacific coast of Panama and Ecuador.

== Species ==
There are currently two recognized species in this genus:

- Evorthodus lyricus (Girard, 1858) (Lyre goby)
- Evorthodus minutus Meek & Hildebrand, 1928 (Small goby)
