= Ilypnus =

Scientific classification
- Kingdom: Animalia
- Phylum: Chordata
- Class: Actinopterygii
- Order: Gobiiformes
- Family: Oxudercidae
- Subfamily: Gobionellinae
- Genus: Ilypnus; D. S. Jordan & Evermann, 1896

Type species
- Lepidogobius gilberti C. H. Eigenmann & R. S. Eigenmann, 1889

Genus of fishes

Ilypnus is a genus of gobies native to the eastern Pacific Ocean coasts of California, United States to Baja California, Mexico.

== Species ==
There are currently two recognized species in this genus:

- Ilypnus gilberti (C. H. Eigenmann & R. S. Eigenmann, 1889) (Cheekspot goby)
- Ilypnus luculentus (Ginsburg, 1938) (Bright goby)
