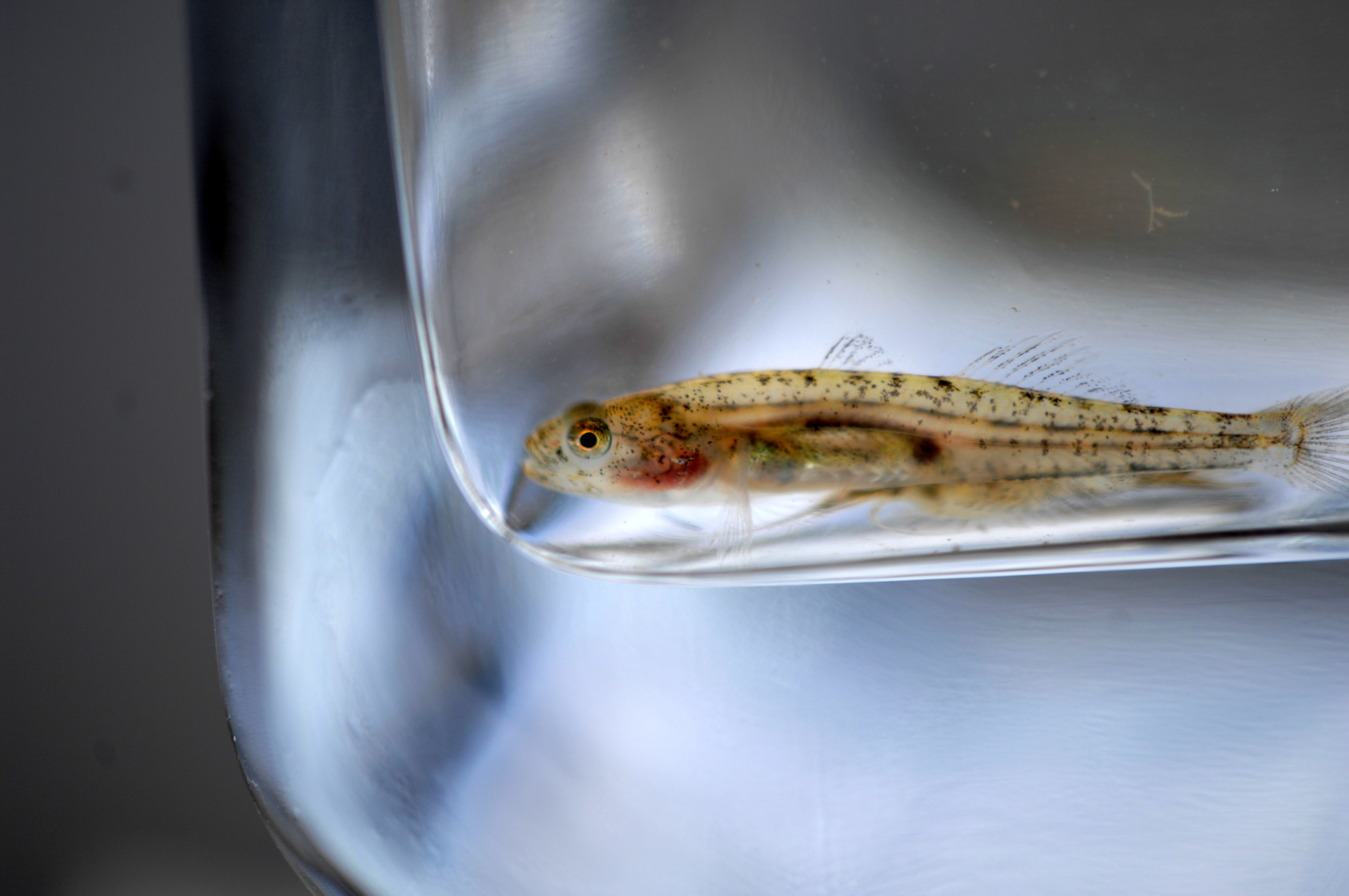
- Eucyclogobius newberryi

Scientific classification
- Kingdom: Animalia
- Phylum: Chordata
- Class: Actinopterygii
- Order: Gobiiformes
- Family: Oxudercidae
- Subfamily: Gobionellinae
- Genus: Eucyclogobius; T. N. Gill, 1862

Type species
- Gobius newberryi Girard, 1856

= Eucyclogobius =

Genus of fishes

Eucyclogobius is a genus of fish in the family Gobiidae endemic to California in United States.

== Species ==
There are currently 2 recognized species in this genus:

- Eucyclogobius kristinae Swift, Spies, Ellingson & Jacobs, 2016 (Southern tide-water goby)
- Eucyclogobius newberryi (Girard, 1856) (Northern tide-water goby)
