= Parawaous =

Conservation status
- Data Deficient (IUCN 3.1)

Scientific classification
- Kingdom: Animalia
- Phylum: Chordata
- Class: Actinopterygii
- Order: Gobiiformes
- Family: Oxudercidae
- Subfamily: Gobionellinae
- Genus: Parawaous; Watson, 1993
- Species: P. megacephalus

Binomial name
- Parawaous megacephalus (Fowler, 1905)

Synonyms
- Chaenogobius megacephalus Fowler, 1905; Awaous megacephalus (Fowler, 1905)

Species of fish

Parawaous megacephalus is a species of fish in the subfamily, Gobionellinae, and the only member of the monotypic genus Parawaous. It is endemic to Borneo, where it occurs in freshwater habitat. It grows to a length of 7.4 centimetres (2.9 in) SL.
