= Ilypnus luculentus =

Conservation status
- Least Concern (IUCN 3.1)

Scientific classification
- Kingdom: Animalia
- Phylum: Chordata
- Class: Actinopterygii
- Division: Teleostei
- Order: Gobiiformes
- Family: Oxudercidae
- Genus: Ilypnus
- Species: I. luculentus

Binomial name
- Ilypnus luculentus (Ginsburg, 1938)

Synonyms
- Lepidogobius luculentus Ginsburg, 1938

Species of ray-finned fish

Ilypnus luculentus, the bright goby or the shining goby, is a species of ray-finned fish. It is found in the Gulf of California and around the southern tip of Baja Califnornia.
