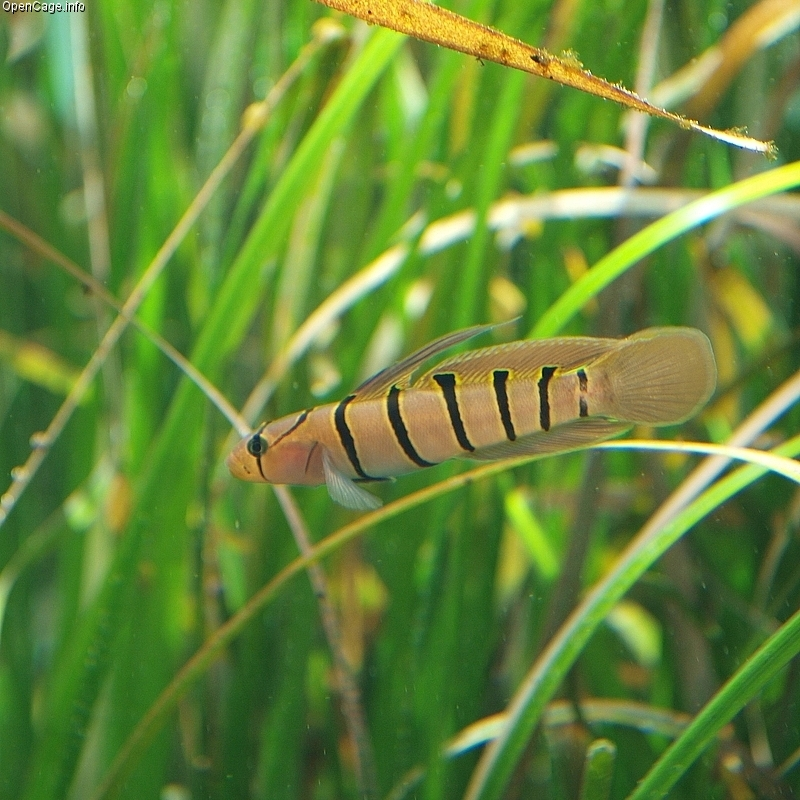
- Pterogobius elapoides

Scientific classification
- Kingdom: Animalia
- Phylum: Chordata
- Class: Actinopterygii
- Division: Teleostei
- Order: Gobiiformes
- Family: Oxudercidae
- Subfamily: Gobionellinae
- Genus: Pterogobius; T. N. Gill, 1863

Type species
- Gobius virgo Temminck & Schlegel, 1845

= Pterogobius =

Genus of fishes

Pterogobius is a genus of fish in the goby subfamily, Gobionellinae, family Oxudercidae, native to the northwestern Pacific Ocean.

== Species ==
There are currently four recognized species in this genus:

- Pterogobius elapoides (Günther, 1872) – serpentine goby
- Pterogobius virgo (Temminck & Schlegel, 1845) – maiden goby
- Pterogobius zacalles D. S. Jordan & Snyder, 1901
- Pterogobius zonoleucus D. S. Jordan & Snyder, 1901
