= Caecogobius cryptophthalmus =

Scientific classification
- Domain: Eukaryota
- Kingdom: Animalia
- Phylum: Chordata
- Class: Actinopterygii
- Order: Gobiiformes
- Family: Oxudercidae
- Subfamily: Gobionellinae
- Genus: Caecogobius
- Species: C. cryptophthalmus

Binomial name
- Caecogobius cryptophthalmus Berti & Ercolini, 1991

Species of fish

Caecogobius cryptophthalmus is a species of goby that is endemic to underground habitats in Calbiga on the Philippine island of Samar. This species is one of two members of the genus Caecogobius (the other is C. personatus). Like other cavefish, C. cryptophthalmus has reduced eyes and pigmentation.

As of 2021, this species is one of only three known cavefish in the Philippines, alongside C. personatus and Barbodes pyrpholeos.
