= Ninnigobius montenegrensis =

Conservation status
- Near Threatened (IUCN 3.1)

Scientific classification
- Kingdom: Animalia
- Phylum: Chordata
- Class: Actinopterygii
- Order: Gobiiformes
- Family: Oxudercidae
- Genus: Ninnigobius
- Species: N. montenegrensis

Binomial name
- Ninnigobius montenegrensis (P. J. Miller & Šanda, 2008)

Synonyms
- Pomatoschistus montenegrensis

Species of fish

Ninnigobius montenegrensis, the Skadar Lake Goby, is a species of goby endemic to Montenegro where it is known to occur in the Morača River and the Zeta and also in a natural channel in Lake Skadar which connects it with Lake Malo Blato. This species occurs in river shallows and pools with gravel substrates on which fine sediment has accumulated and filamentous algae have grown in which these fish hide. Males of this species can reach a length of 2.8 centimetres (1.1 in) while females only reach 2.3 centimetres (0.91 in).
