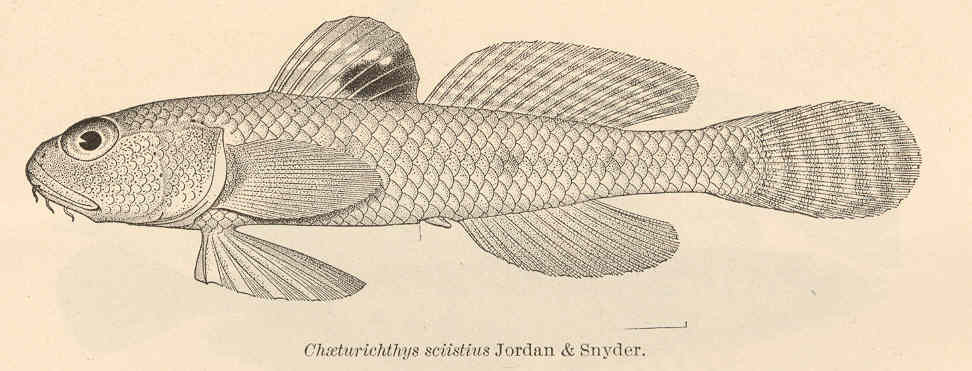
- Chaeturichthys

Scientific classification
- Kingdom: Animalia
- Phylum: Chordata
- Class: Actinopterygii
- Order: Gobiiformes
- Family: Oxudercidae
- Subfamily: Gobionellinae
- Genus: Chaeturichthys; J. Richardson, 1844

Type species
- Chaeturichthys stigmatias J. Richardson, 1844

= Chaeturichthys =

Genus of fishes

Chaeturichthys is a genus of gobies native to the western Pacific Ocean.

== Species ==
There are currently two recognized species in this genus:

- Chaeturichthys jeoni Shibukawa & Iwata, 2013
- Chaeturichthys stigmatias J. Richardson, 1844 (Branded goby)
