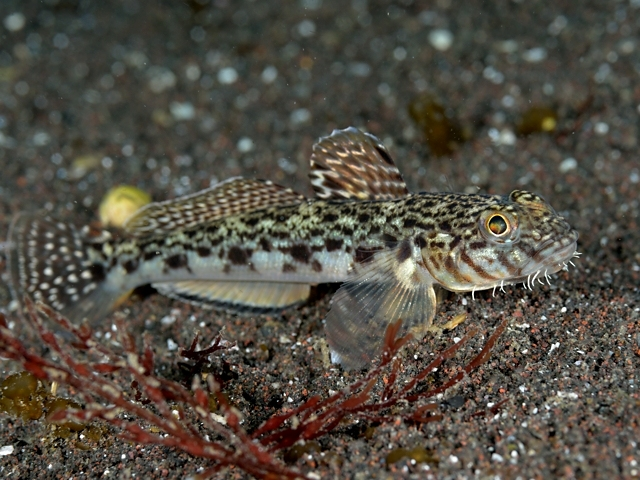

Conservation status
- Least Concern (IUCN 3.1)

Scientific classification
- Kingdom: Animalia
- Phylum: Chordata
- Class: Actinopterygii
- Division: Teleostei
- Order: Gobiiformes
- Family: Oxudercidae
- Subfamily: Gobionellinae
- Genus: Sagamia; Jordan & Snyder, 1901
- Species: S. geneionema

Binomial name
- Sagamia geneionema (Hilgendorf, 1879)

Synonyms
- Genus synonymy: Ainosus Jordan & Snyder, 1901; Species synonymy: Chaeturichthys tanakae Schmidt, 1931; Gobius geneionema Hilgendorf, 1879

= Sagamia =

Genus of fishes

Sagamia is a genus of fishes in the subfamily, Gobionellinae. Its only species is Sagamia geneionema. It is native to the coastal waters of Japan and Korea, where it lives near shore in areas with sandy substrates. The species grows to a length of 7.1 centimetres (2.8 in) SL.

This is an annual species; the adults spawn in January through March, and then nearly all of them die and are replaced by the larvae of the next generation by the following June. The diet of juveniles and adults is largely made up of amphipods. The larvae are prey for other fish such as the sunrise (Pseudoblennius percoides), a species of sculpin.
