= Speleogobius llorisi =

Scientific classification
- Kingdom: Animalia
- Phylum: Chordata
- Class: Actinopterygii
- Order: Gobiiformes
- Family: Oxudercidae
- Genus: Speleogobius
- Species: S. llorisi

Binomial name
- Speleogobius llorisi Kovacic, Ordines & Schliewen, 2016

Species of fish

Speleogobius llorisi, Llori's grotto goby, is a species of ray-finned fish, a true goby from the family Gobiidae. It was described in 2016 from specimens collected in the western Mediterranean Sea.

== Description ==
Speleogobius llorisi has a relatively elongated body which is laterally compressed, and it has a narrow peduncle to the caudal fin. It has a long head which is slightly depressed, having a nearly horizontal nape, and a moderately long snout which is equal to or longer than the diameter of the eye. The head and body to the bases of the pectoral and pelvic fin are coloured orange red and the remainder of the body is whitish to nearly transparent. The nape is whitish pink and the underside of head and cheeks are orange red mottled with whitish markings. There are two melanophores on the chin as well as a transverse orange-red band. The opercle and area in front of the pelvic fin are orange red. There is a dark blotch on the caudal peduncle and there are three wide, transverse dark stripes in the back. The fins are mainly transparent.

== Distribution ==
Speleogobius llorisi was described from specimens collected off the south west coast of the Balearic island of Mallorca in the western Mediterranean. It has since been found in the eastern Aegean Sea off Turkey.

== Habitat and biology ==
The feeding and reproductive habits of Speleogobius llorisi are unknown. It was collected from depths between 40–70 metres (130–230 ft) among beds of red algae dominated by species in the family Peyssonneliaceae, in areas sheltered from significant currents.

== Name ==
The specific name honours the ichthyologist Domenec Lloris of the Institut de Ciències del Mar in Barcelona, in recognition of his “outstanding” contribution to the science of ichthyology.
