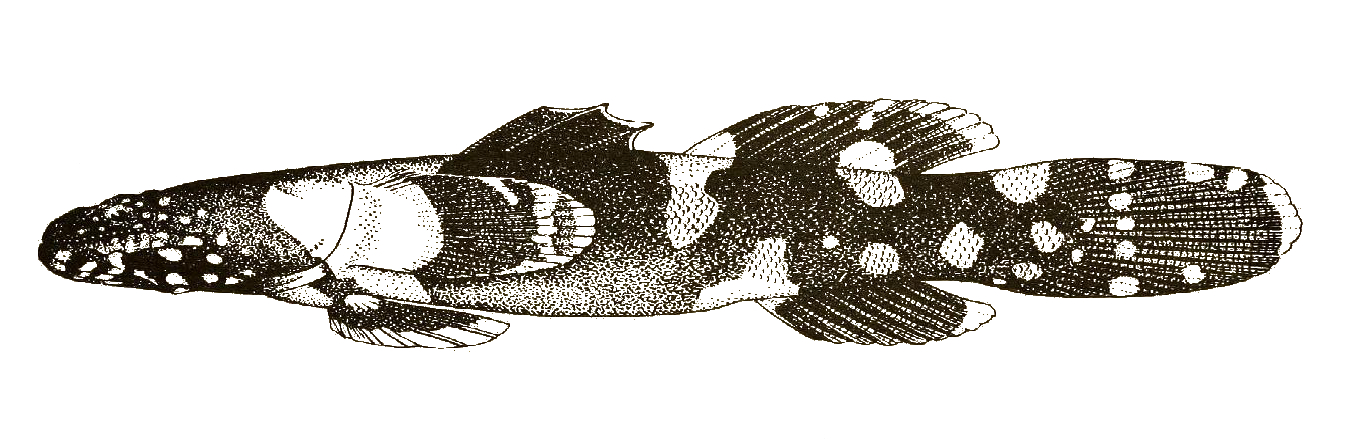
- Astrabe lactisella

Scientific classification
- Kingdom: Animalia
- Phylum: Chordata
- Class: Actinopterygii
- Order: Gobiiformes
- Family: Oxudercidae
- Subfamily: Gobionellinae
- Genus: Astrabe; D. S. Jordan & Snyder, 1901

Type species
- Astrabe lactisella D. S. Jordan & Snyder, 1901

= Astrabe =

Genus of fishes

Astrabe is a small genus of gobies native to the marine waters around Japan.

== Species ==
There are currently three recognized species in this genus:

- Astrabe fasciata Akihito & Meguro, 1988
- Astrabe flavimaculata Akihito & Meguro, 1988
- Astrabe lactisella D. S. Jordan & Snyder, 1901
