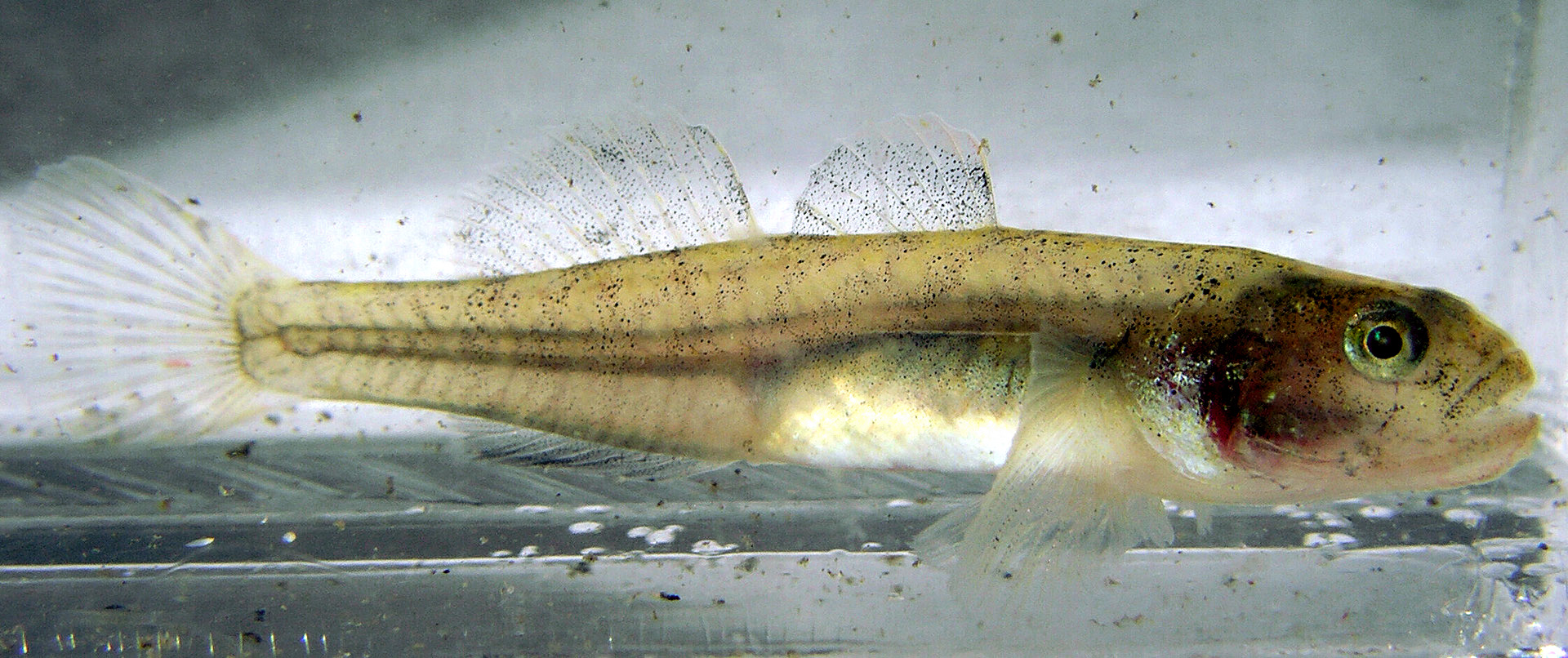

Conservation status
- Vulnerable (IUCN 3.1)

- Endangered (ESA)

Scientific classification
- Kingdom: Animalia
- Phylum: Chordata
- Class: Actinopterygii
- Division: Teleostei
- Order: Gobiiformes
- Family: Oxudercidae
- Genus: Eucyclogobius
- Species: E. newberryi

Binomial name
- Eucyclogobius newberryi (Girard, 1856)

Synonyms
- Gobius newberryi Girard, 1856

= Northern tidewater goby =

Species of fish

Eucyclogobius newberryi, the northern tidewater goby, is a species of goby native to lagoons of streams, marshes, and creeks along the coast of California, United States. The northern tidewater goby is one of six native goby species of California. It is protected under the Endangered Species Act as an endangered species of the United States since 1994.

== Etymology ==
The genus name translates as "true cycloid goby", referring to the scales, while the species epithet is in honor of J. S. Newberry (1822–1892), an American geologist, physician and explorer, who collected fishes for the species describer, Charles Frédéric Girard, just not this species.

== Description ==
A small fish, only rarely longer than 5 cm (2 in), the northern tidewater goby is elongate with a blunt tail. Color is a mottled gray, brown, or olive; living fish are translucent or mostly transparent. Tidewater gobies, like many fish, exhibit countershading and tend to be mottled slightly darker on the dorsal side. The upper part of the first dorsal fin is clear or cream-colored, while the second dorsal is longer than the first, and close in size to the anal fin.

The large mouth extends back to or past the posterior edge of the eye, and is angled upwards. The eyes are spaced far apart. Unusually among gobies, the scales are cycloid instead of ctenoid; they are always absent from the head, and often from the underside too.

Breeding individuals will demonstrate color changes, with the males becoming more black with white spots as females become tan or reddish-brown with golden or dark-brown sides. Females may also take on a darker color while fighting.

Similar fish include the longjaw mudsucker, which can be distinguished from the northern tidewater goby by its more horizontal mouth and shorter rays in the anal fin compared to the 2nd dorsal fin.

== Distribution and habitat ==
Their range extends from Tillas Slough at the mouth of the Smith River in Del Norte County, California, south to Agua Hedionda Lagoon in San Diego County. While once recorded in at least 87 coastal locations, they are now gone from many, including San Francisco Bay, although they can still be found nearby at Rodeo Lagoon in Marin County and in San Pedro Creek in Pacifica.

Despite the common name, this goby inhabits lagoons formed by streams running into the sea, as well as semi-closed estuaries. The lagoons are blocked from the Pacific Ocean by sand bars, admitting salt water only during particular seasons, and so their water is brackish and cool. The northern tidewater goby prefers salinities of less than 10 ppt, but has been documented in waters with a salinity of 42 ppt. E. newberryi prefers water with mild temperatures (8 to 25 °C) and waters with a depth from 25 to 200 cm. Juveniles have been found as far upstream as 12 km, e.g. in Ten Mile River, Mendocino County, and San Antonio Creek and the Santa Ynez River, Santa Barbara County, sometimes in sections of stream impounded by California Golden beavers (Castor canadensis subauratus) which provide ideal slow-moving water habitat for northern tidewater gobies. These fish also prefer sandy bottoms with depths of 20–100 cm, near emergent vegetation beds. These gobies often use thick patches of aquatic vegetation to hide in if threatened or disturbed. The northern tidewater goby may be found in small groups of less than a dozen or occasionally in large aggregations of hundreds.

== Behavior and reproduction ==
Spawning and reproduction is at its peak during spring and into late summer. However, in the southern region of its range where waters remain at a warmer temperature, E. newberryi will reproduce year round. The male then guards the eggs until they hatch, which is 9 to 11 days.

Male northern tidewater gobies burrow into sand and mud in the spring, cementing together grains of sand with a mucous, and shutting the burrow off from the waters above with a mucous and sand plug. Females will become aggressive during the spring and fight over a potential mate, slapping each other with their tails and biting when posturing is insufficient to drive their rivals away. The female will then attempt to entice the male to open his burrow.

If the female is successful (which may be infrequent - Camm Swift reports that 23 observed courtships resulted in only a single successful entry into the burrow by the female,) she will lay eggs on the burrow's sides and roof. The females lay between 300 and 500 eggs into a burrow dug out vertically by the male, which is 10 to 20 cm deep. Spawning locations are usually located out in the open away from any vegetation. The male protects the eggs for 9–10 days before they hatch. Although their life expectancy is not well known, tidewater gobies may live for only a year.

== Diet ==
The diet of the adult northern tidewater goby consists mostly of benthic invertebrates and local insects, though their diet's exact composition can vary by season. In some lagoon populations, gobies have been found to feed on seasonally available invasive New Zealand mud snails, reflecting the fish's adaptive foraging behavior to non-native species in its environment.

== Conservation status ==
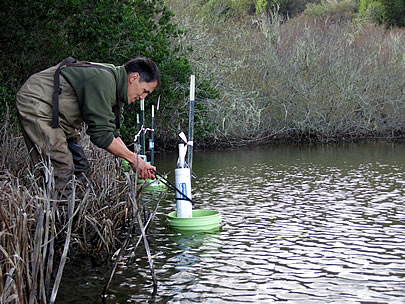
National Park Service biologist releasing tidewater gobies in Tomales Bay as part of a restoration program.

Habitat loss and modification are the main threats to E. newberryi. The brackish areas where saltwater and freshwater meet are where they live usually, such as along the coast of California; this area has been altered by development. Barriers such as dikes and levees have been built to protect residents from potential flooding, but the creation of these barriers has reduced habitat for E. newberryi. Other reasons for population declines are attributed to exotic fish and amphibians which have been introduced to the region. Many of these fish prey on E. newberryi, and others outcompete them for food and habitat. The altering of streams flow with diversions has affected the salinity of the water and changed the habitat at creek mouths where E. newberryi has historically lived. Restoration projects have been started to bring populations back to a more stable number by making more habitat available, as well as providing protective areas. Some levees have been removed and exotic species reduction programs are being initiated.

The northern tidewater goby was listed by the state of California for protection in 1987, and federally listed in 1994. However, there has been some controversy over this, since many populations in its range are apparently secure, and the fish is even abundant at times. However, the fish's need for specific kind of habitat means that the populations are isolated from each other, and subject to extirpation due to various human activities, such as draining of wetlands, sand bar breaches for the purpose of tidal flushing, pollutant accumulation in lagoons, and so forth. Even so, studies have shown that it is a resilient species, and populations have been successfully restored to wetlands that have been protected.
