= Inu (fish) =

Scientific classification
- Kingdom: Animalia
- Phylum: Chordata
- Class: Actinopterygii
- Order: Gobiiformes
- Family: Oxudercidae
- Subfamily: Gobionellinae
- Genus: Inu; Snyder, 1909

Genus of fishes

Inu is a small genus of gobies native to the northwestern Pacific Ocean. They are closely related to Luciogobius.This genus and Luciogobius have a lot of characteristics in common; dorsally-flat head, absence of first dorsal fin, finely segmented vertebrate and so on. Due to this similarity, some scholar integrate this genus into Luciogobius, while some phylogenetic studies support its division with Luciogobius.

Alike Luciogobius, the species of Inu dwell in pebble beach or rocky shore, which provide a plenty of gravel-interstitial spaces. However, it is often pointed out that species of Inu tend to avoid exposing to the air compared to Luciogobius.

== Species ==
There are currently three recognized species in this genus:

- Inu ama Snyder, 1909
- Inu koma Snyder, 1909
- Inu saikaiensis (Dôtu, 1957)
