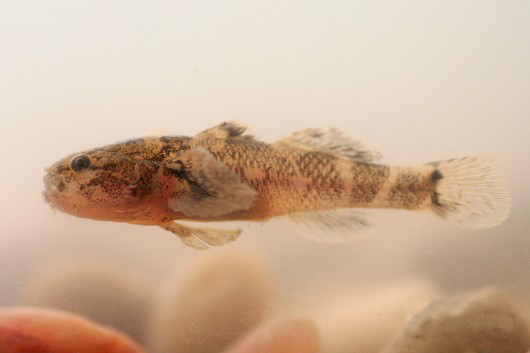
- Triaenopogon barbatus

Scientific classification
- Kingdom: Animalia
- Phylum: Chordata
- Class: Actinopterygii
- Order: Gobiiformes
- Family: Oxudercidae
- Subfamily: Gobionellinae
- Genus: Triaenopogon; Bleeker, 1874

= Triaenopogon =

Genus of fishes

Triaenopogon is a genus of fish in the subfamily of gobies called the Gobionellinae.

These fish are native to the coastal waters of China, Japan, and Korea, where they live in brackish habitat types. They are often dominant members of the local fish fauna.

These gobies are generally under 10 centimetres (3.9 in) long. They have tricuspid outer teeth on their upper and lower jaws.

== Species ==
There are currently two recognized species in this genus:

- Triaenopogon barbatus (Günther, 1861) (Shokihaze goby)
- Triaenopogon radiatus (R. F. Cui, Y. S. Pan, X. M. Yang & Y. Y. Wang, 2013)
