= Paedogobius =

Conservation status
- Least Concern (IUCN 3.1)

Scientific classification
- Kingdom: Animalia
- Phylum: Chordata
- Class: Actinopterygii
- Division: Teleostei
- Order: Gobiiformes
- Family: Oxudercidae
- Subfamily: Gobionellinae
- Genus: Paedogobius; Iwata, Hosoya & Larson, 2001
- Species: P. kimurai

Binomial name
- Paedogobius kimurai Iwata, S. Hosoya & Larson, 2001

Species of fish

Paedogobius kimurai is a species of goby from the subfamily Gobionellinae, and the only member of the monotypic genus Paedogobius. It is native to marine and brackish waters of inner bays in Japan, Thailand and Australia. Its English language common names include wide-gape paedomorphic goby and babyface goby. Its Japanese language common name is shirasukiba-haze.

This fish is a protogynous hermaphrodite, undergoing a form of sequential hermaphroditism in which females change sex to male. It is a diandric species, one in which there are two types of male, the primary male that is born male, and the secondary male that is born female but later becomes male.

The species is also paedomorphic, with mature adults retaining some characteristics of larvae. The genus name Paedogobius is inspired by this trait. The adult female lacks a pelvic fin.

The adult female and both types of male generally measure between 1.1 and 1.2 cm (0.43 and 0.47 in) long. The fish is elongated and compressed in shape. It has a rodlike pelvis, with left and right halves not connected. There is a single dorsal fin, and only the male has a pelvic fin. There are no scales. The larva-like female has a nearly transparent body with its ovary visible through the body wall. The female and primary male have upper and lower conical teeth.

After spawning, the female changes sex and becomes the secondary male. She grows a pelvic fin, changes shape, and produces fertile sperm. The primary and secondary males are about the same size, but the secondary male is more robust. The head is rounded rather than compressed, and the head and jaw bones are larger. The teeth are much larger, like canines. The body is more pigmented.

This small fish is also known to reach sexual maturity very quickly, at about 42 to 67 days of age.
