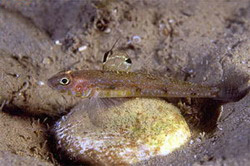
- Deltentosteus quadrimaculatus

Scientific classification
- Kingdom: Animalia
- Phylum: Chordata
- Class: Actinopterygii
- Order: Gobiiformes
- Family: Oxudercidae
- Subfamily: Gobionellinae
- Genus: Deltentosteus; T. N. Gill, 1863

Type species
- Gobius quadrimaculatus Valenciennes, 1837

= Deltentosteus =

Genus of fishes

Deltentosteus is a genus of gobies native to the eastern Atlantic Ocean and the Mediterranean Sea.

== Species ==
There are currently two recognized species in this genus:

- Deltentosteus collonianus (A. Risso, 1820) (Toothed goby)
- Deltentosteus quadrimaculatus (Valenciennes, 1837) (Four-spotted goby)
