= Lobulogobius omanensis =

Conservation status
- Least Concern (IUCN 3.1)

Scientific classification
- Kingdom: Animalia
- Phylum: Chordata
- Class: Actinopterygii
- Division: Teleostei
- Order: Gobiiformes
- Family: Gobiidae
- Genus: Lobulogobius
- Species: L. omanensis

Binomial name
- Lobulogobius omanensis Koumans, 1944

Species of fish

Lobulogobius omanensis, the Oman goby, is a species of goby found in the Indo-West Pacific.

== Size ==
This species reaches a length of 5.0 cm (2.0 in).
