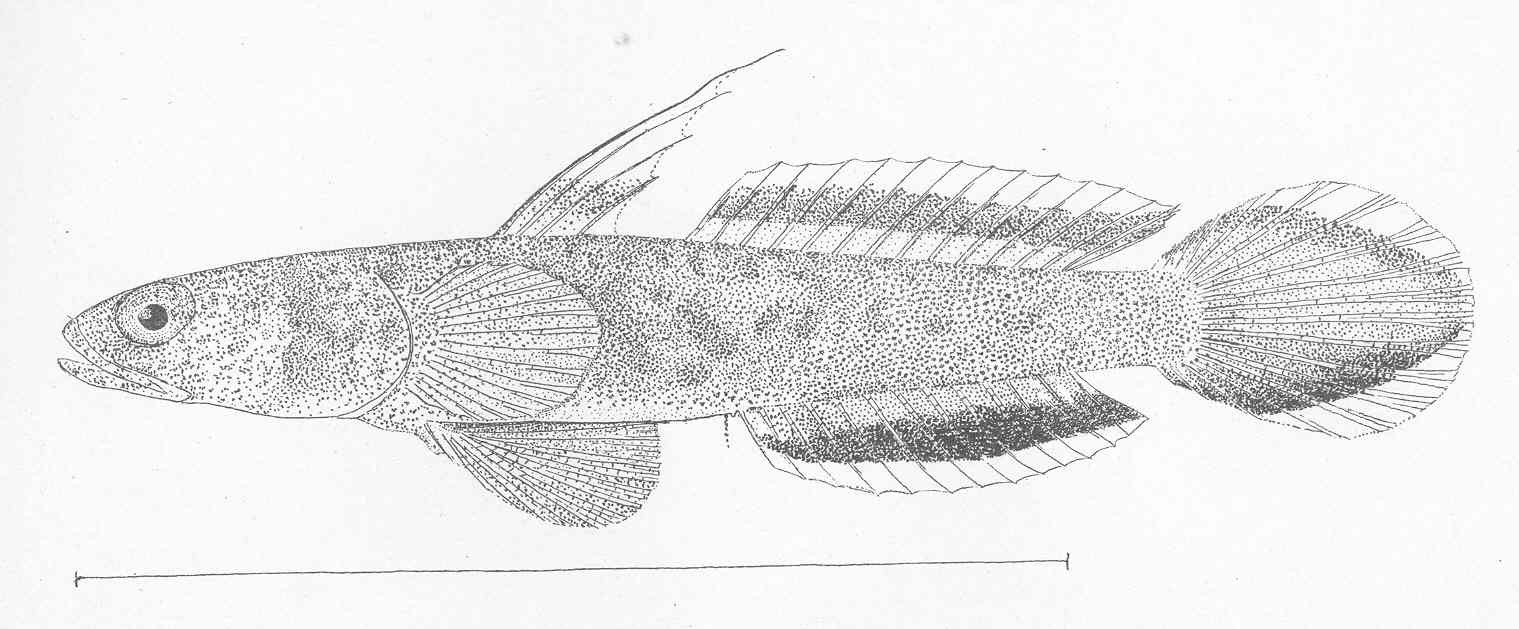
- Evermannia zosterura

Scientific classification
- Kingdom: Animalia
- Phylum: Chordata
- Class: Actinopterygii
- Order: Gobiiformes
- Family: Oxudercidae
- Subfamily: Gobionellinae
- Genus: Evermannia; D. S. Jordan, 1895

Type species
- Gobiosoma zosterurum D. S. Jordan & C. H. Gilbert, 1882

= Evermannia =

Genus of fishes

Evermannia is a genus of gobies native to the eastern central Pacific Ocean coast of the Americas from Baja California to Panama. The genus name honours the American ichthyologist Barton Warren Evermann (1853–1932).

== Species ==
There are currently four recognized species in this genus:

- Evermannia erici W. A. Bussing, 1983
- Evermannia longipinnis (Steindachner, 1879) (Enigmatic goby)
- Evermannia panamensis C. H. Gilbert & Starks, 1904
- Evermannia zosterura (D. S. Jordan & C. H. Gilbert, 1882) (Bandedtail goby)
