= Kelloggella disalvoi =

Scientific classification
- Kingdom: Animalia
- Phylum: Chordata
- Class: Actinopterygii
- Order: Gobiiformes
- Family: Gobiidae
- Genus: Kelloggella
- Species: K. disalvoi

Binomial name
- Kelloggella disalvoi Randall, 2009

Species of fish

Kelloggella disalvoi is a small species of ray-finned fish in the family Gobiidae. It is endemic to Easter Island.
