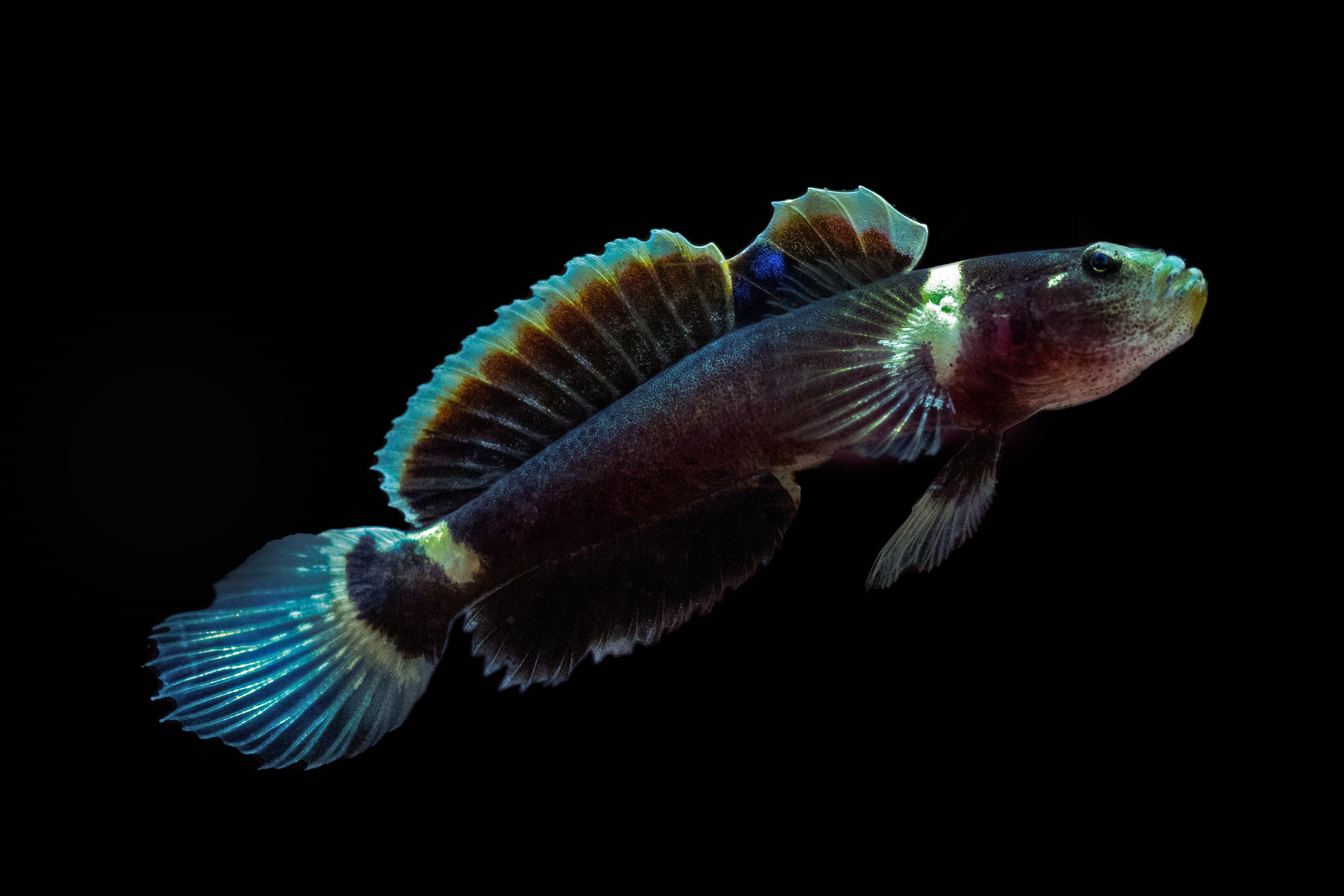

Conservation status
- Data Deficient (IUCN 3.1)

Scientific classification
- Kingdom: Animalia
- Phylum: Chordata
- Class: Actinopterygii
- Order: Gobiiformes
- Family: Gobiidae
- Genus: Mangarinus
- Species: M. waterousi

Binomial name
- Mangarinus waterousi Herre, 1943

= Mangarinus waterousi =

Species of fish

Mangarinus waterousi is a species of goby native to fresh and brackish waters of Japan, the Philippines, Indonesia, Palau and Micronesia. This species grows to a length of 4.8 centimetres (1.9 in) SL. The specific name honours the Medical Corps (United States Army) physician Willard H. Waterous (1890-1964) who was a friend of the author, A. W. Herre, and who allowed him to use the Hacienda Waterous on Mindoro, where he collected the type.
