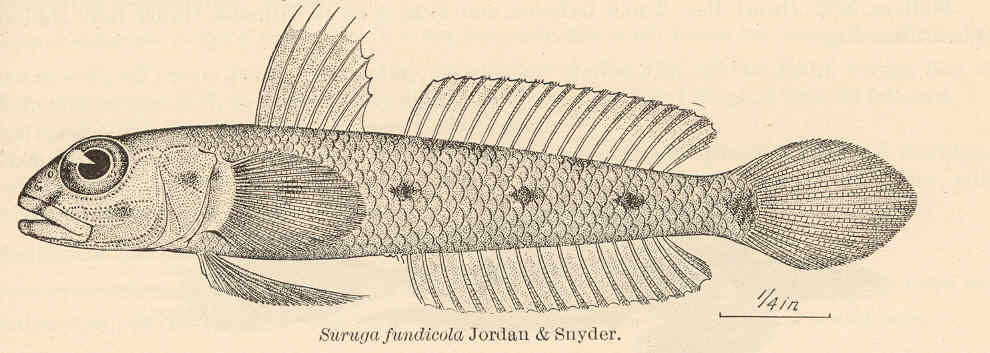

Conservation status
- Least Concern (IUCN 3.1)

Scientific classification
- Kingdom: Animalia
- Phylum: Chordata
- Class: Actinopterygii
- Order: Gobiiformes
- Family: Oxudercidae
- Subfamily: Gobionellinae
- Genus: Suruga
- Species: S. fundicola

Binomial name
- Suruga fundicola D. S. Jordan & Snyder, 1901

= Suruga fundicola =

Species of fish

Suruga fundicola is a species of fish in the goby subfamily, Gobionellinae. It is native to the Pacific Ocean waters around Japan, where it occurs at depths of 80 to 300 metres (260 to 980 ft). It is the only known member of the monotypic genus Suruga, which was named for Japan's Suruga Bay.
