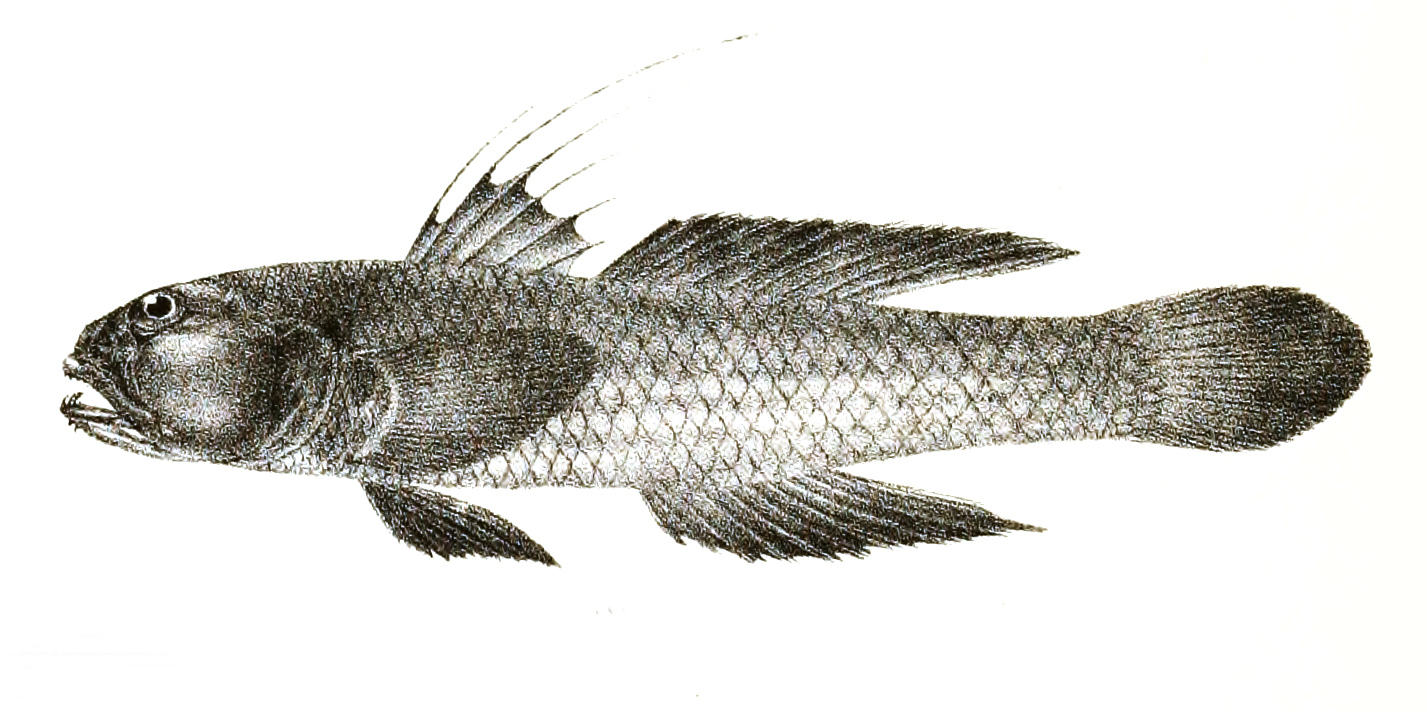

Conservation status
- Least Concern (IUCN 3.1)

Scientific classification
- Kingdom: Animalia
- Phylum: Chordata
- Class: Actinopterygii
- Order: Gobiiformes
- Family: Gobiidae
- Genus: Aulopareia
- Species: A. cyanomos

Binomial name
- Aulopareia cyanomos (Bleeker, 1849)

Synonyms
- Gobius cyanomos Bleeker, 1849; Acentrogobius cyanomos (Bleeker, 1849)

= Aulopareia cyanomos =

Species of goby fish

Aulopareia cyanomos, or the threadfin blue goby is an amphidromous benthopelagic species of goby found in brackish and salt water in Bangladesh, India, Indonesia, Malaysia, and Thailand. Individuals grow up to 11.5 centimetres (4.5 in) long.
