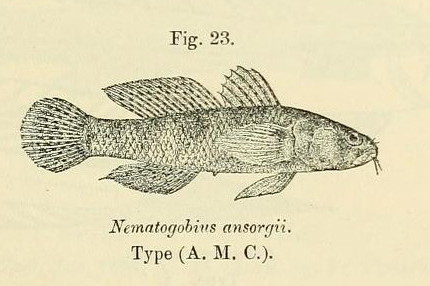

Scientific classification
- Kingdom: Animalia
- Phylum: Chordata
- Class: Actinopterygii
- Order: Gobiiformes
- Family: Gobiidae
- Genus: Nematogobius
- Species: N. maindroni

Binomial name
- Nematogobius maindroni (Sauvage, 1880)

Synonyms
- Gobius maindroni Sauvage, 1880; Nematogobius ansorgii Boulenger, 1910

= Nematogobius maindroni =

Species of fish

Nematogobius maindroni is a species of ray-finned fish from the family Gobiidae, a true goby. It is native to the Eastern Atlantic from Senegal to Angola, it has also been reported from Namibia and from the islands in the Gulf of Guinea. It is common in brackish estuaries, but may migrate up rivera into freshwater. The specific name honours the French entomologist Maurice Maindron (1857-1911), the collector of the type specimen from Senegal.
