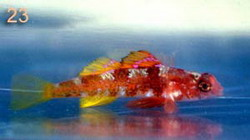
- Speleogobius trigloides

Scientific classification
- Kingdom: Animalia
- Phylum: Chordata
- Class: Actinopterygii
- Order: Gobiiformes
- Family: Oxudercidae
- Subfamily: Gobionellinae
- Genus: Speleogobius; Zander & H. J. Jelinek, 1976

Type species
- Speleogobius trigloides Zander & Jelinek 1976

= Speleogobius =

Genus of fishes

Speleogobius is a genus of goby native to the Mediterranean Sea.

== Species ==
There are currently 2 recognized species in this genus:

- Speleogobius llorisi Kovačić, Ordines & Schliewen, 2016
- Speleogobius trigloides Zander & H. J. Jelinek, 1976 (Grotto goby)
