= Lophiogobius =

Conservation status
- Least Concern (IUCN 3.1)

Scientific classification
- Kingdom: Animalia
- Phylum: Chordata
- Class: Actinopterygii
- Division: Teleostei
- Order: Gobiiformes
- Family: Oxudercidae
- Genus: Lophiogobius; Günther, 1873
- Species: L. ocellicauda

Binomial name
- Lophiogobius ocellicauda Günther, 1873

Synonyms
- Genus: Cassigobius Whitley, 1931; Ranulina D. S. Jordan & Starks, 1906; Species: Ranulina fimbriidens D. S. Jordan & Starks, 1906

Species of fish

Lophiogobius ocellicauda is a species of freshwater Gobiidae, native to China and South Korea. This species is the only known member of its genus.
