= Psilogobius mainlandi =

Scientific classification
- Kingdom: Animalia
- Phylum: Chordata
- Class: Actinopterygii
- Division: Teleostei
- Order: Gobiiformes
- Family: Gobiidae
- Genus: Psilogobius
- Species: P. mainlandi

Binomial name
- Psilogobius mainlandi Baldwin, 1972

Species of fish

Psilogobius mainlandi, also called the Hawaiian shrimp goby, is a species of goby native to the Hawaiian Islands.
