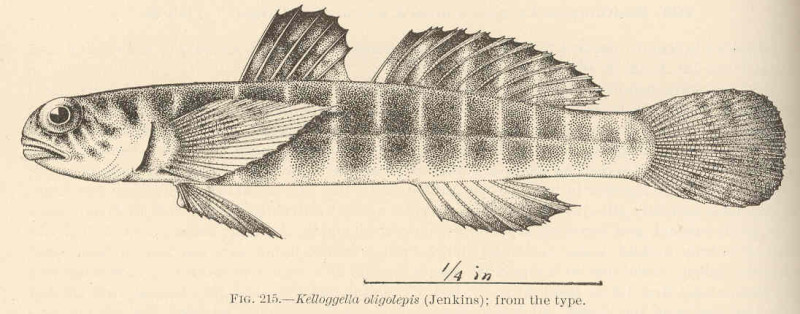

Scientific classification
- Kingdom: Animalia
- Phylum: Chordata
- Class: Actinopterygii
- Order: Gobiiformes
- Family: Gobiidae
- Genus: Kelloggella
- Species: K. oligolepis

Binomial name
- Kelloggella oligolepis (O. P. Jenkins, 1903)

= Kelloggella oligolepis =

Species of fish

Kelloggella oligolepis is a small species of ray-finned fish in the family Gobiidae. It is endemic to the Hawaiian Islands.
