= Coryogalops ocheticus =

Conservation status
- Endangered (IUCN 3.1)

Scientific classification
- Kingdom: Animalia
- Phylum: Chordata
- Class: Actinopterygii
- Order: Gobiiformes
- Family: Gobiidae
- Genus: Coryogalops
- Species: C. ocheticus

Binomial name
- Coryogalops ocheticus (Norman, 1927)

Synonyms
- Gobius ocheticus Norman, 1927; Monishia ochetica (Norman, 1927)

Species of fish

Coryogalops ocheticus is a species of ray-finned fish from the family Gobiidae from the Red Sea. It has been reported twice in the Mediterranean Sea off Egypt in 1924 and 1969, but not since. It is found in shallow water, in the proximity of crevices and holes, on sand and mud flats, where there is algal growth, and in stony areas. It attains a total length of 6.2 centimetres (2.4 in). In preserved specimens it is pale fawn in colour and is marked with lateral blotches and mottling on the cheeks.
