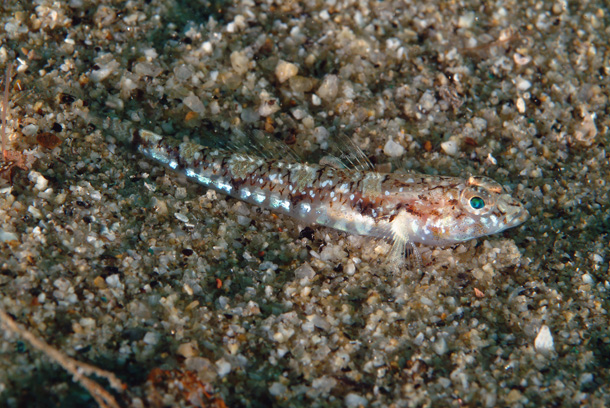
- Buenia affinis

Scientific classification
- Kingdom: Animalia
- Phylum: Chordata
- Class: Actinopterygii
- Order: Gobiiformes
- Family: Oxudercidae
- Subfamily: Gobionellinae
- Genus: Buenia; Iljin, 1930

Type species
- Gobius affinis Kolombatovic, 1891

= Buenia =

Genus of fishes

Buenia is a genus of gobies native to the eastern Atlantic Ocean and the Mediterranean Sea. The name of the genus and the common name of the type species honour Fernando de Buen y Lozano (1895-1962), the Spanish oceanographer and marine biologist.

== Species ==
There are currently three recognized species in this genus:

- Buenia affinis Iljin, 1930 (de Buen's goby)
- Buenia jeffreysii (Günther, 1867) (Jeffrey's goby)
- Buenia lombartei Kovačić, Ordines & Schliewen, 2018
- Buenia massutii Kovačić, Ordines & Schliewen, 2017
