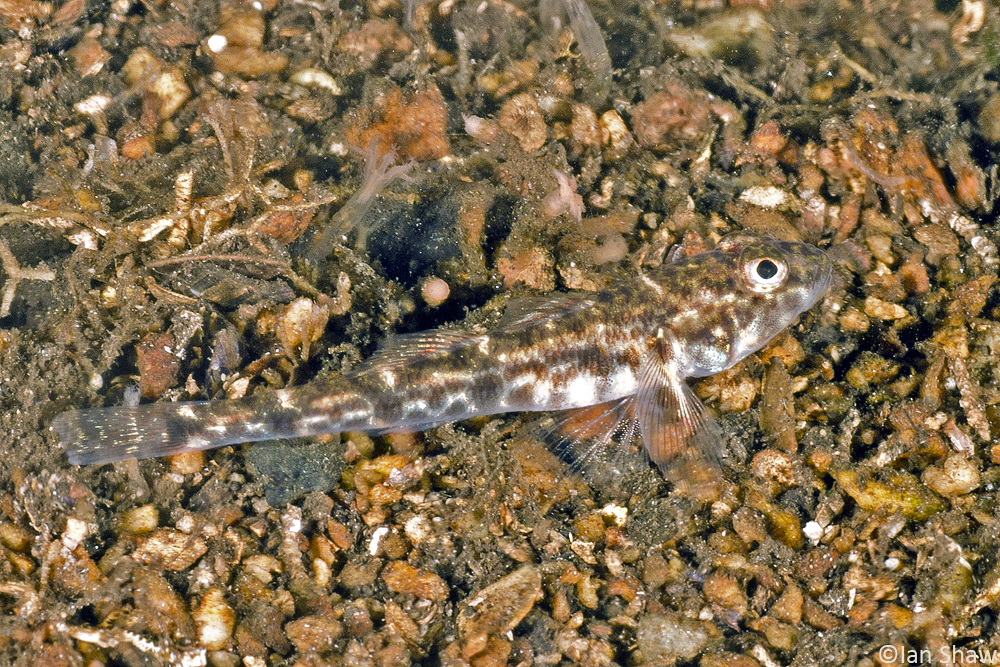
- Nesogobius hinsbyi

Scientific classification
- Kingdom: Animalia
- Phylum: Chordata
- Class: Actinopterygii
- Order: Gobiiformes
- Family: Oxudercidae
- Subfamily: Gobionellinae
- Genus: Nesogobius; Whitley, 1929

Type species
- Gobius hinsbyi McCulloch & J. D. Ogilby, 1919

= Nesogobius =

Genus of fishes

Nesogobius is a genus of goby native to the coastal waters of Australia.

== Species ==
There are currently 5 recognized species in this genus:

- Nesogobius greeni Hoese & Larson, 2006
- Nesogobius hinsbyi (McCulloch & J. D. Ogilby, 1919) (Tasmanian orange-spotted sandgoby)
- Nesogobius maccullochi Hoese & Larson, 2006
- Nesogobius pulchellus (Castelnau, 1872) (Australian sailfingoby)
- Nesogobius tigrinus M. P. Hammer, Hoese & Bertozzi, 2015 (Tiger sandgoby)
