= Cloudy goby =

Conservation status
- Least Concern (IUCN 3.1)

Scientific classification
- Kingdom: Animalia
- Phylum: Chordata
- Class: Actinopterygii
- Order: Gobiiformes
- Family: Gobiidae
- Genus: Hazeus
- Species: H. nephodes

Binomial name
- Hazeus nephodes (E. K. Jordan, 1925)

Synonyms
- Opua nephodes

Species of fish

Hazeus nephodes is a species of ray-finned fish from the family Gobiidae which is native to the Marshall Islands and Hawaii. It is associated with reefs at depths of 1–169 metres (0–600 ft). It grows to a standard length of 4.4 centimetres (1.7 in).
