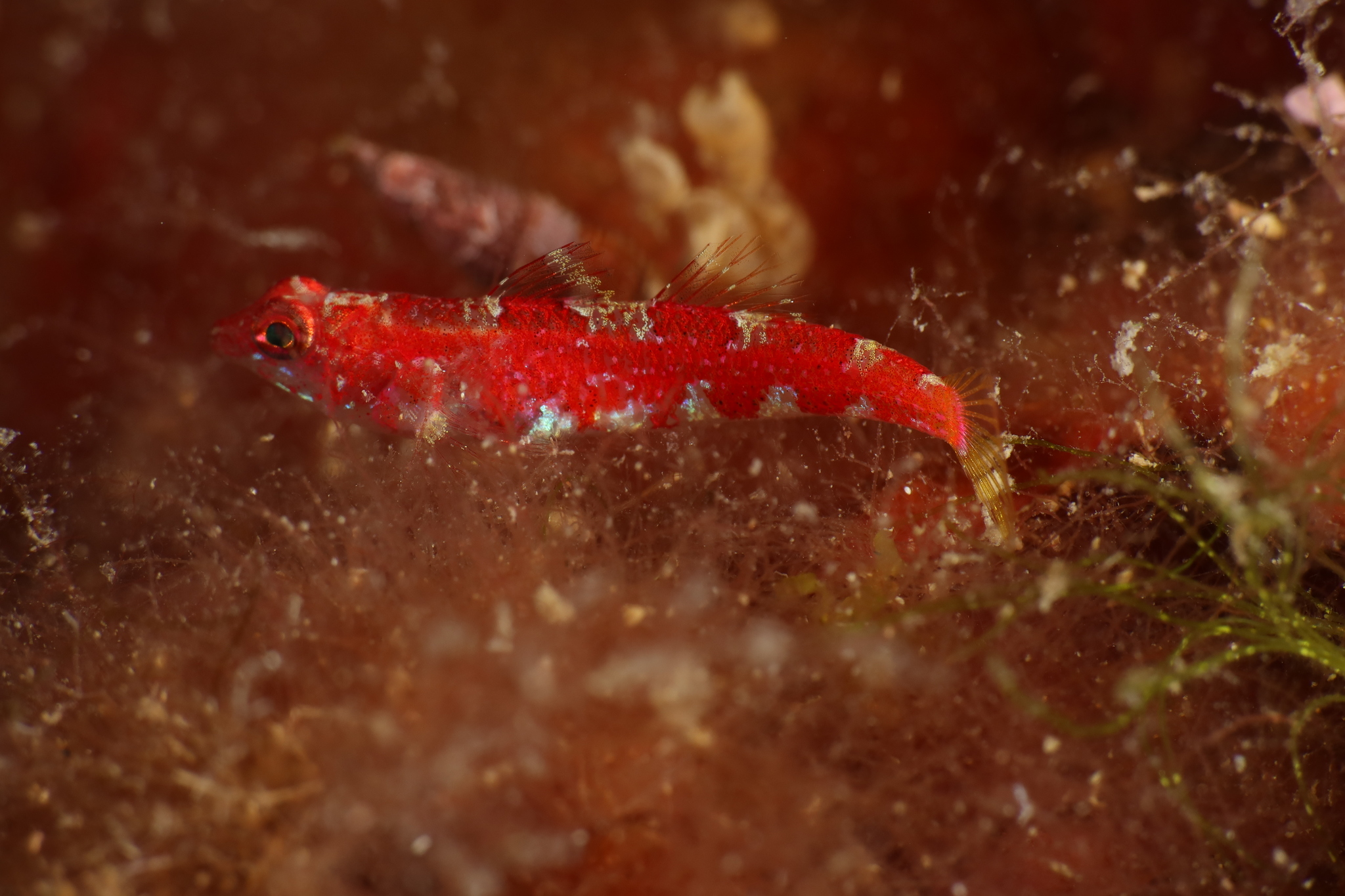

Conservation status
- Least Concern (IUCN 3.1)

Scientific classification
- Domain: Eukaryota
- Kingdom: Animalia
- Phylum: Chordata
- Class: Actinopterygii
- Order: Gobiiformes
- Family: Gobiidae
- Genus: Speleogobius
- Species: S. trigloides

Binomial name
- Speleogobius trigloides Zander & H. J. Jelinek, 1976

= Speleogobius trigloides =

Species of fish

Speleogobius trigloides, also known as the Grotto goby, is a species of goby native to the Mediterranean Sea where it is known to inhabit grottoes at depths of from 8 to 25 metres (26 to 82 ft). This species grows to a length of 1.8 centimetres (0.71 in) SL.
