= Coryogalops =

Scientific classification
- Kingdom: Animalia
- Phylum: Chordata
- Class: Actinopterygii
- Order: Gobiiformes
- Family: Gobiidae
- Genus: Coryogalops; J. L. B. Smith, 1958

Type species
- Coryogalops anomolus J. L. B. Smith, 1958

Synonyms
- Monishia Smith, 1959

Genus of fishes

Coryogalops is a genus of gobies native to the southeastern Atlantic Ocean and the western Indian Ocean along the coasts of Africa and Asia from South Africa to Pakistan.

== Species ==
There are currently 12 recognized species in this genus:

- Coryogalops adamsoni (Goren, 1985) (Adamson's goby)
- Coryogalops anomolus J. L. B. Smith, 1958 (Anomalous goby)
- Coryogalops bretti Goren, 1991
- Coryogalops bulejiensis (Hoda, 1983) (Thin-barred goby)
- Coryogalops guttatus Kovačić & Bogorodsky, 2014
- Coryogalops monospilus J. E. Randall, 1994 (One-spot goby)
- Coryogalops nanus Kovačić & Bogorodsky, 2016
- Coryogalops ocheticus (Norman, 1927)
- Coryogalops pseudomonospilus Kovačić & Bogorodsky, 2014
- Coryogalops sordidus (J. L. B. Smith, 1959) (Epaulette goby)
- Coryogalops tessellatus J. E. Randall, 1994
- Coryogalops william (J. L. B. Smith, 1948) (Kaalpens goby)
