= Lobulogobius =

Scientific classification
- Domain: Eukaryota
- Kingdom: Animalia
- Phylum: Chordata
- Class: Actinopterygii
- Order: Gobiiformes
- Family: Gobiidae
- Genus: Lobulogobius; Koumans, 1944

Type species
- Lobulogobius omanensis Koumans, 1944

Synonyms
- Sicyodon Fourmanoir, 1966

Genus of fishes

Lobulogobius is a small genus of gobies native to the Indian Ocean and the western Pacific Ocean.

== Species ==
There are currently three recognized species in this genus:

- Lobulogobius bentuviai Goren, 1984
- Lobulogobius morrigu Larson, 1983
- Lobulogobius omanensis Koumans, 1944 (Oman goby)
