= Wuhanlinigobius =

Scientific classification
- Kingdom: Animalia
- Phylum: Chordata
- Class: Actinopterygii
- Order: Gobiiformes
- Family: Gobiidae
- Genus: Wuhanlinigobius; S. P. Huang, Jaafar & I. S. Chen, 2014

Type species
- Mugilogobius polylepis H. L. Wu & Y. Ni, 1985

Genus of fishes

Wuhanlinigobius is a genus of gobies native to mangrove swamps of eastern Asia.

== Etymology ==
This genus was named to honor the Chinese ichthyologist Dr. Wu Han-Lin who contributed greatly to the study of gobioid fishes of China.

== Species ==
There are currently 2 recognized species in this genus:

- Wuhanlinigobius malayensis S. P. Huang, Jaafar & I. S. Chen, 2014
- Wuhanlinigobius polylepis (H. L. Wu & Y. Ni, 1985)
