= Mangarinus =

Scientific classification
- Kingdom: Animalia
- Phylum: Chordata
- Class: Actinopterygii
- Order: Gobiiformes
- Family: Gobiidae
- Genus: Mangarinus; Herre, 1943

Genus of fishes

Mangarinus is a small genus of gobies native to fresh and brackish waters of Japan, the Philippines, Indonesia, Palau and Micronesia, and the Northern Indian Ocean.

It contains two species:

- Mangarinus waterousi Herre, 1943
- Mangarinus seshaiyai (Jacob & Rangarajan 1960)
