= Aulopareia =

Scientific classification
- Kingdom: Animalia
- Phylum: Chordata
- Class: Actinopterygii
- Order: Gobiiformes
- Family: Gobiidae
- Subfamily: Gobiinae
- Genus: Aulopareia; H. M. Smith, 1945

Type species
- Aulopareia janetae H. M. Smith, 1945

Genus of fishes

Aulopareia is a genus of gobies native to the western Pacific Ocean where members of this genus can be found in marine, fresh and brackish waters.

== Species ==
There are currently five recognized species in this genus:

- Aulopareia cyanomos (Bleeker, 1849)
- Aulopareia koumansi (Herre, 1937)
- Aulopareia ocellata (Day, 1873)
- Aulopareia unicolor (Valenciennes, 1837)
- Aulopareia vadosa Larson & Jaafar, 2022
