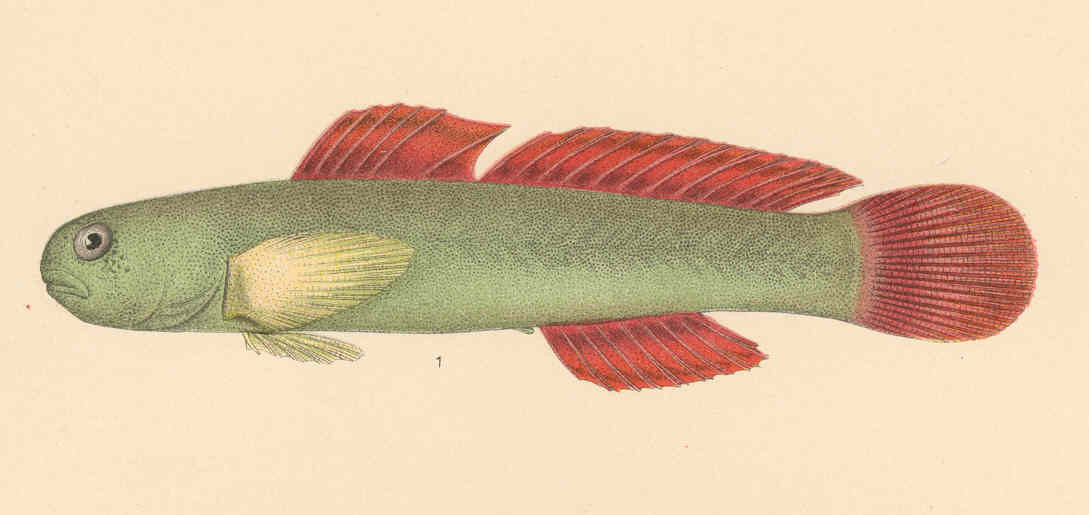
- Kelloggella cardinalis

Scientific classification
- Kingdom: Animalia
- Phylum: Chordata
- Class: Actinopterygii
- Order: Gobiiformes
- Family: Gobiidae
- Subfamily: Gobiinae
- Genus: Kelloggella; D. S. Jordan & Seale, 1905

Type species
- Enypnias oligolepis O. P. Jenkins, 1903

Synonyms
- Agunia Fowler, 1946; Atuona Herre, 1935; Itbaya Herre, 1927

= Kelloggella =

Genus of fishes

Kelloggella is a genus of fish in the family Gobiidae, the gobies. This genus is distributed in the Indian and Pacific Oceans. The genus name honours the American entomologist Vernon Lyman Kellogg (1867-1937) of Stanford University, the discoverer of Kelloggella cardinalis.

== Species ==
There are currently six recognized species in this genus:

- Kelloggella avaiki Tornabene, Deis & Erdmann, 2017 (Star-spangled goby)
- Kelloggella cardinalis D. S. Jordan & Seale, 1906 (Cardinal goby)
- Kelloggella disalvoi J. E. Randall, 2009 (Disalvo's goby)
- Kelloggella oligolepis (O. P. Jenkins, 1903)
- Kelloggella quindecimfasciata (Fowler, 1946) (Central goby)
- Kelloggella tricuspidata (Herre, 1935)
