= Psilogobius =

Scientific classification
- Kingdom: Animalia
- Phylum: Chordata
- Class: Actinopterygii
- Order: Gobiiformes
- Family: Gobiidae
- Genus: Psilogobius; W. J. Baldwin, 1972

Type species
- Psilogobius mainlandi W. J. Baldwin, 1972

Genus of fishes

Psilogobius is a genus of gobies native to the Indian Ocean and the Pacific Ocean.

== Species ==
There are currently three recognized species in this genus:

- Psilogobius mainlandi W. J. Baldwin, 1972 (Mainland's goby)
- Psilogobius prolatus Watson & Lachner, 1985 (Longjaw shrimpgoby)
- Psilogobius randalli (Goren & Karplus, 1983)
