= Volga dwarf goby =

Conservation status
- Least Concern (IUCN 3.1)

Scientific classification
- Kingdom: Animalia
- Phylum: Chordata
- Class: Actinopterygii
- Order: Gobiiformes
- Family: Oxudercidae
- Genus: Hyrcanogobius
- Species: H. bergi

Binomial name
- Hyrcanogobius bergi Iljin, 1928

Synonyms
- Knipowitschia bergi (Iljin, 1928)

Species of fish

Hyrcanogobius bergi, the Volga dwarf goby, is a species of goby endemic to the Caspian Sea where it occurs in fresh, brackish and marine waters along the coast. Unusual for gobies, this species is almost a fully pelagic fish. H. bergi grows to a length of 3.6 centimetres (1.4 in) SL. This species is also the only known member of its genus. The specific name honours the Soviet zoologist Lev Berg (1876-1950) who described many new species of goby from the Caspian Sea.
