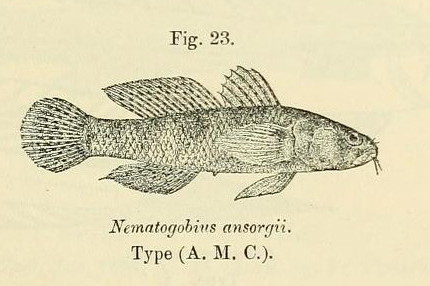
- Nematogobius maindroni

Scientific classification
- Kingdom: Animalia
- Phylum: Chordata
- Class: Actinopterygii
- Order: Gobiiformes
- Family: Gobiidae
- Genus: Nematogobius; Boulenger, 1910

Type species
- Nematogobius ansorgii Boulenger, 1910

= Nematogobius =

Genus of fishes

Nematogobius is a genus of gobies native to the Atlantic coast of Africa.

== Species ==
There are currently two recognized species in this genus:

- Nematogobius brachynemus Pfaff, 1933
- Nematogobius maindroni (Sauvage, 1880)
