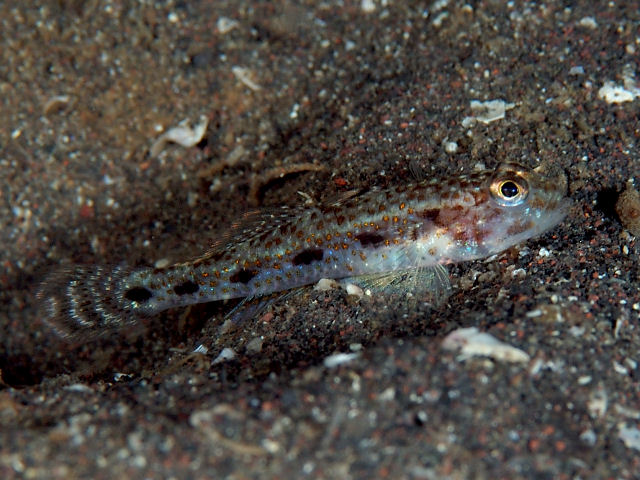
- Hazeus otakii

Scientific classification
- Kingdom: Animalia
- Phylum: Chordata
- Class: Actinopterygii
- Order: Gobiiformes
- Family: Gobiidae
- Subfamily: Gobiinae
- Genus: Hazeus; D. S. Jordan & Snyder, 1901

Type species
- Hazeus otakii D. S. Jordan & Snyder, 1901

= Hazeus =

Genus of fishes

Hazeus is a genus of gobies, from the family Gobiidae, native to the Red Sea, the Indian Ocean and the northwestern Pacific Ocean.

== Species ==
These are the currently recognized species in this genus:

- Hazeus ammophilus Allen & Erdmann 2021
- Hazeus elati (Goren, 1984) (Eilat sandgoby)
- Hazeus ingressus Engin, Larson & Irmak, 2018 (Immigrant goby)
- Hazeus maculipinna (J. E. Randall & Goren, 1993)
- Hazeus nephodes (E. K. Jordan, 1925) (Cloudy goby)
- Hazeus otakii D. S. Jordan & Snyder, 1901 (Scalyhead goby)
- Hazeus paucisquamatus G. R. Allen, Erdmann & Brooks, 2024(Louisiade sand-goby)
- Hazeus profusus Allen & Erdmann 2021
