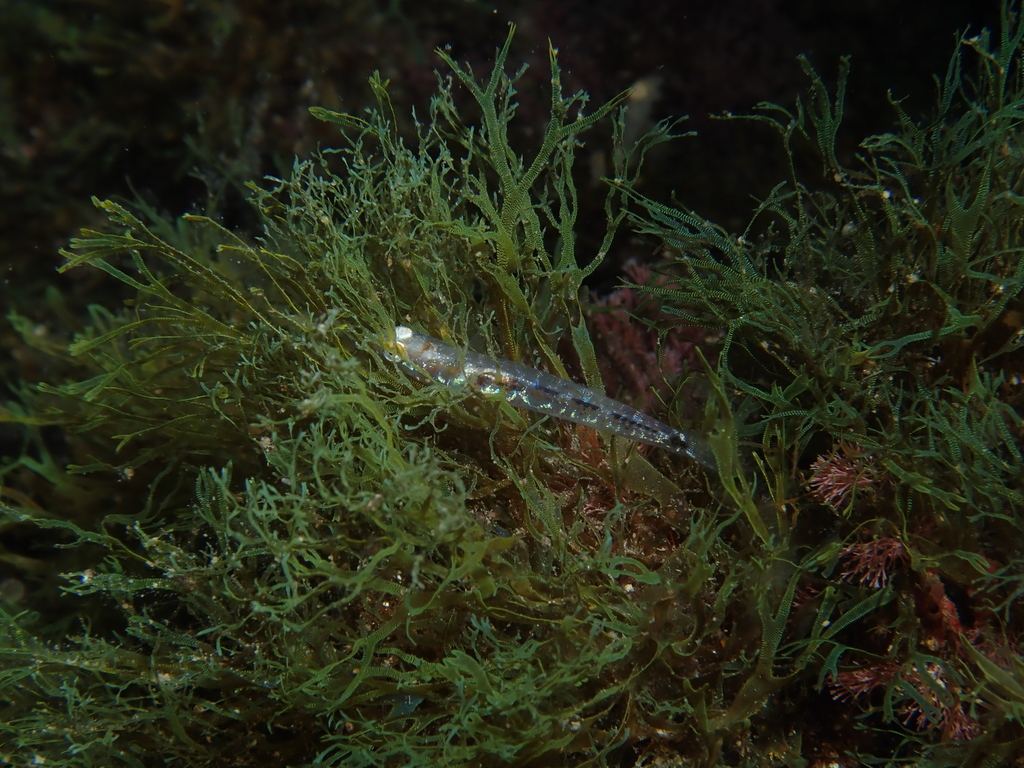

Conservation status
- Least Concern (IUCN 3.1)

Scientific classification
- Kingdom: Animalia
- Phylum: Chordata
- Class: Actinopterygii
- Order: Gobiiformes
- Family: Gobiidae
- Genus: Pseudaphya
- Species: P. ferreri

Binomial name
- Pseudaphya ferreri (O. de Buen & Fage, 1908)

Synonyms
- Aphya ferreri O. de Buen & Fage, 1908; Pseudaphya pelagica F. de Buen, 1931

= Ferrer's goby =

Species of fish

Ferrer's goby (Pseudaphya ferreri) is a species of goby native to the Mediterranean Sea where it occurs in inshore waters inhabiting areas with sandy substrates. This species grows to a length of 3.5 centimetres (1.4 in) TL. This species is the only known member of its genus. The specific name honours Jaume Ferrer Aledo (1854-1956), a pharmacist and amateur ichthyologist who studied the fish fauna in the Balearic Islands.
