= Siphonogobius =

Conservation status
- Least Concern (IUCN 3.1)

Scientific classification
- Kingdom: Animalia
- Phylum: Chordata
- Class: Actinopterygii
- Division: Teleostei
- Order: Gobiiformes
- Family: Gobiidae
- Genus: Siphonogobius
- Species: S. nue

Binomial name
- Siphonogobius nue Shibukawa & Iwata, 1998

Species of fish

Siphonogobius nue is a species of goby that is the only species of the monotypic genus Siphonogobius. It is native to the coastal waters of Japan where it occurs on sandy substrates with rocks or artificial structures for concealment. A shallow water fish, it is found at depths of from 1 to 2 metres (3.3 to 6.6 ft). Males of this species grows to a length of 9.2 centimetres (3.6 in) SL while the females only reach 8.3 centimetres (3.3 in) SL. This species is the only known member of its genus.
