= Awaouichthys =

Scientific classification
- Kingdom: Animalia
- Phylum: Chordata
- Class: Actinopterygii
- Order: Gobiiformes
- Family: Gobiidae
- Genus: Awaouichthys; Chatterjee & Mishra, 2012
- Species: A. menoni

Binomial name
- Awaouichthys menoni Chatterjee & Mishra, 2012

Genus of fishes

Awaouichthys menoni is a species of goby native to the Sunderbans of India. This species is the only known member of its genus.
