= Polyspondylogobius =

Conservation status
- Least Concern (IUCN 3.1)

Scientific classification
- Kingdom: Animalia
- Phylum: Chordata
- Class: Actinopterygii
- Division: Teleostei
- Order: Gobiiformes
- Family: Gobiidae
- Genus: Polyspondylogobius
- Species: P. sinensis

Binomial name
- Polyspondylogobius sinensis Seishi Kimura & H. L. Wu, 1994

Species of fish

Polyspondylogobius sinensis is a species of ray-finned fish from the family Gobiidae, the true gobies. It is native to the Pacific coast of China where it is only known to occur in marine and brackish waters in Guangdong and Guangxi provinces. This species occurs in shallow bays, around river mouths and in tide pools. This species grows to a length of 4.9 centimetres (1.9 in) SL. This species is the only known member of its genus.
