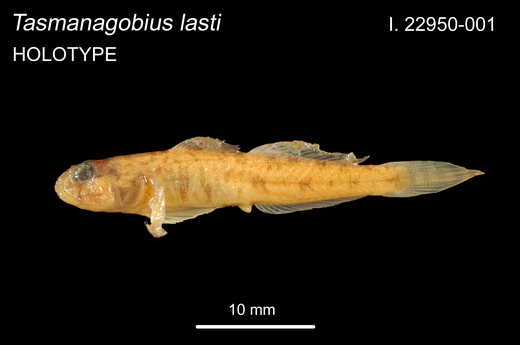
- Holotype of Tasmanogobius lasti

Scientific classification
- Domain: Eukaryota
- Kingdom: Animalia
- Phylum: Chordata
- Class: Actinopterygii
- Order: Gobiiformes
- Family: Gobiidae
- Genus: Tasmanogobius; E. O. G. Scott, 1935

Type species
- Tasmanogobius lordi E. O. G. Scott, 1935

= Tasmanogobius =

Genus of fishes

Tasmanogobius is a genus of gobies native to fresh, marine and brackish waters along the coasts of southern Australia and Tasmania.

== Species ==
There are currently three recognized species in this genus:

- Tasmanogobius gloveri Hoese, 1991 (Marine goby)
- Tasmanogobius lasti Hoese, 1991 (Lagoon goby)
- Tasmanogobius lordi E. O. G. Scott, 1935 (Lord's goby)
