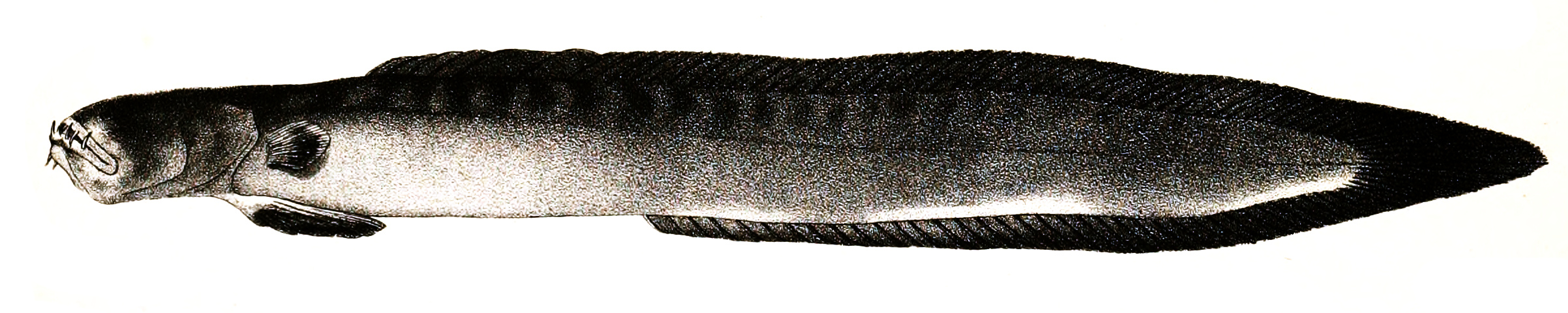
- Gobioides buchanani
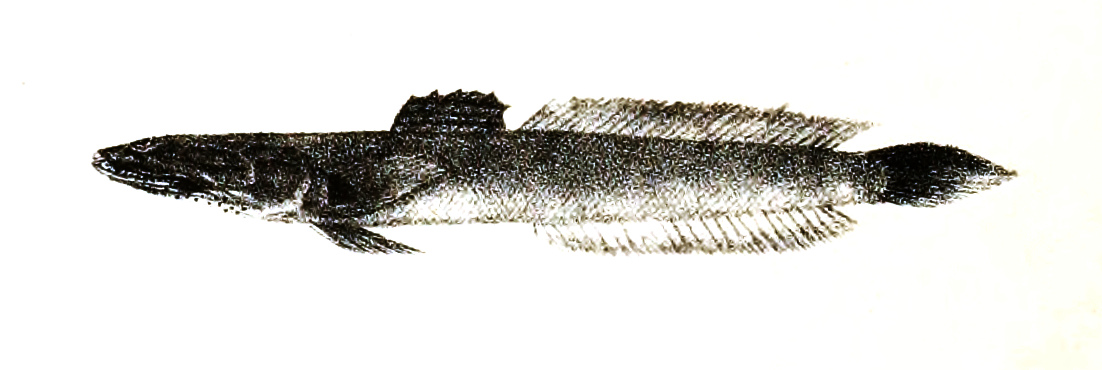
- Oxuderces dentatus

Scientific classification
- Kingdom: Animalia
- Phylum: Chordata
- Class: Actinopterygii
- Order: Gobiiformes
- Suborder: Gobioidei
- Family: Oxudercidae; Günther, 1861

Synonyms
- Gobionellidae

= Oxudercidae =

Oxudercidae Temporal range: Middle Miocene–present

Family of fishes

Oxudercidae is a family of gobies which consists of four subfamilies which were formerly classified under the family Gobiidae. The family is sometimes called the Gobionellidae, but Oxudercidae has priority. The species in this family have a cosmopolitan distribution in temperate and tropical areas and are found in marine and freshwater environments, typically in inshore, euryhaline areas with silt and sand substrates.

The Oxudercidae includes 86 genera, which contain around 600 species. This family has many species which occur in fresh water, and a number of species found on wet beaches and are able to live for a number of days out of water. The family includes the mudskippers, which include species that are able to move over land quite quickly. They have eyes located on the top of their heads on short stalks. They are capable of elevating or retracting them, and they can see well out of water. One species, Gillichthys mirabilis, usually stays in the water, but surfaces to gulp air when the oxygen levels in the water are low; it holds the air in its buccopharynx, which is highly vacularised to facilitate respiratory exchange.

Fossil oxudercids are known from the Middle Miocene of Europe.

== Subfamilies ==
These subfamilies are included in the Oxudercidae:

- Amblyopinae Günther, 1861
- Gobionellinae Bleeker, 1874
- Oxudercinae (including the mudskippers) Günther, 1861
- Sicydiinae T.N. Gill, 1860
