= 2024 in paleoichthyology =

This list of fossil fish research presented in 2024 is a list of new fossil taxa of jawless vertebrates, placoderms, cartilaginous fishes, bony fishes, and other fishes that were described during the year, as well as other significant discoveries and events related to paleoichthyology that occurred in 2024.

== Jawless vertebrates ==
Name	Novelty	Status	Authors	Age	Type locality	Location	Notes	Images
Caeruleum gracilis	Sp. nov	Valid	Huang et al.	Early Cretaceous	Jiufotang Formation	China	A lamprey.	
Changxingaspis nianzhongi	Sp. nov	Valid	Li et al.	Silurian	Tataertag Formation	China	A member of Galeaspida belonging to the family Xiushuiaspidae.	
Dunyu tianlu	Sp. nov	Valid	Li et al.	Silurian	Xiaoxi Formation	China		
Lugiiaspis	Gen. et sp. nov	Valid	Capasso et al.	Silurian (Přídolí)	Winnica Mudstone Complex	Poland	A member of Pteraspidiformes. The type species is L. winnicus.	
Miaojiaaspis	Gen. et sp. nov	Valid	Chen et al.	Silurian (Telychian)	Huixingshao Formation	China	A member of Galeaspida belonging to the group Eugaleaspiformes and the newly minted family Tujiaaspidae (type Tujiaaspis). The type species is M. dichotomus.	
Orthogoniaspis amnicus	Sp. nov		Elliott	Devonian		Canada (Nunavut)	A member of Heterostraci belonging to the family Weigeltaspididae.	

=== Jawless vertebrate research ===
- A study on the evolutionary history of hagfishes, as indicated by the fossil record and molecular data, is published by Brownstein & Near (2024), who consider the hagfish crown group to be a lineage with Early Permian origin and a long history in continental slope settings.
- Brookfield (2024) interprets Jamoytius kerwoodi as a probable detritivore or herbivore feeding on Dictyocaris (interpreted by the author as possible algal thalli).
- Evidence interpreted as indicating that oral plates of pteraspid heterostracans had a mechanical function and that the studied heterostracans likely had a bottom-dwelling feeding mode, such as deposit feeding or scavenging, is presented by Grohganz et al. (2024).
- A study on the structure of pteraspid oral plates and associated denticles is published by Grohganz et al. (2024), who interpret their findings as indicating that heterostracan oral plate denticles were not homologous with teeth of jawed vertebrates.
- Botella, Fariña & Huera-Huarte (2024) present evidence indicating that, in spite of lacking movable appendages other than tail fin, members of Pteraspidiformes were able to colonize the water column because the shape of their head shield made to possible for them attain high lift forces in a way similar to delta wings.
- Description of the feeding apparatus of Rhinopteraspis dunensis, interpreted as composed of 13 plates that were capable of rotating around the transverse axis, is published by Dearden et al. (2024), who interpret R. dunensis as a suspension or deposit feeder.
- Shan et al. (2024) describe new fossil material of "Dongfangaspis" qujingensis and Damaspis vartus from the Devonian Xishancun Formation (China), and reinterpret "D." qujingensis as a member of the genus Damaspis.

== Placoderms ==
Name	Novelty	Status	Authors	Age	Type locality	Location	Notes	Images
Groenlandaspis howittensis	Sp. nov	Valid	Fitzpatrick, Clement & Long	Devonian	Bindaree Formation	Australia		

=== Placoderm research ===
- Jobbins et al. (2024) describe new fossil material of Alienacanthus malkowskii, providing evidence of elongation of the lower jaw which was twice as long as the skull.
- Engelman (2024) presents a new reconstruction of Dunkleosteus terrelli, and provides the anatomical basis for the reconstruction including a stout, deep trunk.

== Cartilaginous fishes ==
Name	Novelty	Status	Authors	Age	Type locality	Country	Notes	Images
Aellopobatis	Gen. et sp. nov	Valid	Türtscher et al.	Late Jurassic (Tithonian)		Germany	A member of Batomorphi belonging to the family Spathobatidae. The type species is A. bavarica.	
Amtaaguar	Gen. et comb. nov		De Pasqua et al.	Neogene		Argentina; France; United States	An eagle ray. The type species is "Myliobatis" crassus (Gervais, 1859).	
Belgabatis	Gen. et comb. nov	Valid	Reinecke et al.	Paleogene		Belgium	A dasyatoid batomorph. The type species is "Dasyatis" thierryi Smith (1999).	
Casierabatis	Gen. et sp. comb. nov	Valid	Reinecke et al.	Paleogene		Belgium	A dasyatoid batomorph. Genus includes new species C. lambrechtsi, as well as "Trygon" jaekeli Leriche (1905).	
Centrodeania	Gen. et 2 sp. nov	Valid	Feichtinger et al.	Paleocene (Danian)	Oiching Formation	Austria	A member of the family Centrophoridae. The type species is C. rugosa; genus also includes C. annae.	
Chlamydoselachus kamchaticus	Sp. nov	Valid	Malyshkina & Nazarkin	Eocene	Peresheek Mountain Formation	Russia (Kamchatka Krai)	A species of Chlamydoselachus.	
Columnaodus	Gen. et sp. nov	Valid	Cicimurri et al.	Carboniferous (Mississippian)	Contact horizon between Burlington and Keokuk Limestones	United States (Illinois; Iowa)	A member of Hybodontoidea of uncertain affinities. The type species is C. witzkei.	
Cosmoselachus	Gen. et sp. nov	Valid	Bronson et al.	Carboniferous (Mississippian)	Fayetteville Shale	United States (Arkansas)	A member of the family Falcatidae. The type species is C. mehlingi.	
Danodalatias	Gen. et sp. et comb. nov	Valid	Popov, Lopyrev & Yarkov	Paleocene		New Zealand; Russia (Volgograd Oblast)	A member of the family Dalatiidae. Genus includes new species D. ochevi, as well as "Centroselachus" goordi Mannering & Hiller (2008).	
Dorsetoscyllium belbekensis	Sp. nov		Trikolidi	Early Cretaceous (Berriasian)		Crimea	A carpet shark. Published online in 2025, but the issue date is listed as December 2024.	
Eostriatolamia iktensis	Sp. nov	Valid	Duffin & Batchelor	Early Cretaceous (Aptian)	Vectis Formation	United Kingdom	A member of Lamniformes.	
Essexraja	Gen. et sp. nov	Valid	Reinecke et al.	Eocene	London Clay	United Kingdom	A batomorph. The type species is E. ypresiensis.	
Eurasiabatis	Gen. et sp. nov	Valid	Reinecke et al.	Paleogene	Tielt Formation	Belgium	A batomorph. The type species is E. occlusostriata.	
Glaucopristis	Gen. et comb. nov	Valid	Reinecke et al.	Paleogene		Belgium	A rhinopristiform batomorph. The type species is "Rhinobatus" bruxelliensis Jaekel (1894).	
Glikmanius careforum	Sp. nov	Valid	Hodnett et al.	Carboniferous (Mississippian)		United States (Alabama; Kentucky)		
Gunnellia	Gen. et sp. nov	Valid	Ivanov & Duffin	Carboniferous		Russia (Moscow Oblast)	A member of the family Anachronistidae. The type species is G. tatianae.	
Gyracanthides riniensis	Sp. nov	Valid	Gess & Burrow	Devonian (Famennian)	Waterloo Farm lagerstätte	South Africa	A gyracanthid acanthodian.	
Gyracanthus? jasperi	Sp. nov	Valid	Snyder, Burrow & Turner	Carboniferous (Mississippian)	Ste. Genevieve Formation	United States (Iowa)	A gyracanthid acanthodian.	
Heterodontus adneti	Sp. nov	Valid	Migom	Eocene		France	A bullhead shark.	
Incognitorapax	Gen. et sp. nov	Valid	Feichtinger et al.	Late Cretaceous (Maastrichtian) and Paleocene (Danian)		Austria; Germany	A member of the family Etmopteridae. The type species is I. fernsebneri.	
Orthacanthus adamas	Nom. nov	Valid	Babcock	Carboniferous	Upper Freeport Coal	United States (Ohio)	A replacement name for Orthacanthus gracilis Newberry (1875).	
Orthacanthus lintonensis	Nom. nov	Valid	Babcock	Carboniferous	Upper Freeport Coal	United States (Ohio)	A replacement name for Diplodus gracilis Newberry (1857).	
Palaeohypotodus bizzocoi	Sp. nov	Valid	Ebersole, Cicimurri & Harrell	Paleocene (Danian)	Porters Creek Formation	United States (Alabama)	A member of Lamniformes belonging to the family Jaekelotodontidae.	
Parvodus ominechonensis	Sp. nov	Valid	Breeden et al.	Late Triassic (Carnian)	Momonoki Formation	Japan	A lonchidiid hybodontiform.	
Pteroscyllium downesi	Sp. nov	Valid	Duffin & Batchelor	Early Cretaceous (Aptian)	Atherfield Clay Formation	United Kingdom	A carcharhiniform shark with affinities with catsharks.	
Pteroscyllium sweetmani	Sp. nov	Valid	Duffin & Batchelor	Early Cretaceous (Aptian)	Vectis Formation	United Kingdom		
Scyliorhinus alaformis	Sp. nov	Valid	Feichtinger et al.	Paleocene (Danian)	Oiching Formation	Austria	A species of Scyliorhinus.	
Serratodasyatis	Gen. et comb. nov	Valid	Reinecke et al.	Paleogene		Belgium	A dasyatoid batomorph. The type species is "Dasyatis" tricuspidatus Casier (1946).	
Sheppeytrygon	Gen. et comb. nov	Valid	Reinecke et al.	Eocene	London Clay	United Kingdom	A dasyatoid batomorph. The type species is "Dasyatis" davisi Casier (1966).	
Stoilodon lindenbergi	Sp. nov	Valid	Hornung et al.	Early Cretaceous (Berriasian)	Isterberg Formation	Germany	A member of Chimaeroidea of uncertain affinities.	
Troglocladodus	Gen. et sp. nov	Valid	Hodnett et al.	Carboniferous (Mississippian)		United States (Alabama; Kentucky)	A ctenacanthid. Genus includes T. trimblei.	
Turovella	Gen. et sp. nov	Valid	Ivanov & Duffin	Carboniferous		Russia (Moscow Oblast)	A member of the family Anachronistidae. The type species is T. lebedevi.	
Vectiscyllium	Gen. et sp. nov	Valid	Duffin & Batchelor	Early Cretaceous (Aptian)	Atherfield Clay Formation	United Kingdom	A carcharhiniform shark with affinities with catsharks. The type species is V. atherfieldensis.	
Xampylodon diastemacron	Sp. nov		Dos Santos et al.	Late Cretaceous (Maastrichtian)	López de Bertodano Formation	Antarctica	A cow shark.	

=== Cartilaginous fish research ===
- Schnetz et al. (2024) study the completeness of the Paleozoic fossil record of chondrichthyans, finding it to be significantly lower compared to other investigated vertebrate groups.
- A study on the diversification of chondrichthyans throughout the Paleozoic is published by Schnetz et al. (2024), who report evidence indicative of two increases of diversification rates in the earliest Devonian and in the earliest Carboniferous, and of dispersal into deeper-water environments in the aftermath of the Hangenberg event.
- A diverse assemblage of cartilaginous fish fossils is described from the Eocene Osinovaya Formation (Rostov Oblast, Russia) by Popov et al. (2024).
- A study on the anatomy of the pharynx of Acanthodes confusus, providing evidence of the presence of a mixture of characters seen in cartilaginous and bony fish, is published by Dearden, Herrel & Pradel (2024).
- The first fossil material of obruchevodid petalodonts found outside the Bear Gulch Limestone, including teeth of Fissodopsis robustus and Netsepoye hawesi providing information on their three-dimensional tooth morphology, is described from the Carboniferous (Mississippian) Bangor Limestone (Alabama, United States) by Egli et al. (2024).
- Brownstein, Near & Dearden (2024) reconstruct the evolutionary history of holocephalans, and argue that, while key features of the holocephalan body plan evolved in the Paleozoic, the group entered deep ocean waters and diversified there only after the Cretaceous–Paleogene extinction event.
- Böttcher (2024) argues that preservation of isolated hybodont teeth without the root is most likely caused by resorption of the tooth root in members of Hybodontiformes.
- New hybodont assemblage, representing one of the oldest records of Jurassic hybodonts from Gondwana reported to date, is described from the Bajocian Jaisalmer Formation (India) by Ghosh et al. (2024).
- Fanai et al. (2024) reported the first occurrence of Otodus Megalodon from Bhuban Formation of Mizoram (India).
- The oldest fossil material of members of the genus Strophodus from Gondwana reported to date is described from the ?Early to Middle Jurassic succession of Kachchh Basin (India) by Bhosale et al. (2024).
- Cuny & Chanthasit (2024) describe egg capsules of Palaeoxyris sp. from the Jurassic Phu Kradung Formation (Thailand), interpreted as indicating that at least some hybodont sharks in Jurassic Thailand reproduced in fresh waters.
- Fossil material of Aegyptobatus kuehnei, formerly known only from the Bahariya Formation (Egypt), is described from the Alcântara Formation (Brazil) by Neves et al. (2024).
- A study on the evolutionary history of selachians (modern sharks) is published by Sternes, Schmitz & Higham (2024), who argue that modern sharks expanded to the pelagic realm no later than the Barremian, that habitat influenced the morphology of their pectoral fins, and that the increase of sea surface temperature in the middle of the Cretaceous period was an important factor in driving the evolution of shark ecology and morphology.
- Guinot et al. (2024) describe a new specimen of Palaeocarcharias stromeri from the Tithonian strata of the Canjuers Lagerstätte (France), providing new information on the anatomy of members of this species, and classify P. stromeri as a carpet shark that might be related to wobbegongs.
- The first fossil material of a member of the wobbegong genus Cederstroemia from Asia reported to date is described from the Santonian Kashima Formation (Japan) by Kaneko & Solonin (2024).
- Vullo et al. (2024) describe new fossil material of Ptychodus from the Upper Cretaceous strata in Mexico, providing evidence that Ptychodus was a high-speed mackerel shark that likely fed on nektonic hard-shelled prey such as ammonites and sea turtles.
- Fossil material of mackerel sharks, including one of the youngest records of Cretoxyrhina mantelli reported to date, is described from the Campanian Duwi Formation (Egypt) by Yassin et al. (2024).
- Shimada et al. (2024) describe two isolated teeth of Megalolamna paradoxodon from the Miocene Calvert Formation (Maryland, United States), representing the northernmost record of Megalolamna reported to date, and a tooth from the Oligocene Chandler Bridge Formation (South Carolina, United States) which might represent the geologically oldest record of a member of the genus Megalolamna reported to date.
- Pollerspöck & Shimada (2024) describe fossil material of members of the genus Megalolamna from the Miocene strata in Austria, France, Germany and Italy, and interpret the type species of this genus, M. paradoxodon, as a junior synonym of "Otodus" serotinus Probst (1879), resulting in a new combination Megalolamna serotinus.
- Sternes et al. (2024) reevaluate the accuracy of the body form of Otodus megalodon inferred by Cooper et al. (2022), compare an incomplete vertebral column of a specimen of O. megalodon from the Miocene of Belgium with corresponding parts of the vertebral columns of extant white sharks, and argue that O. megalodon had an elongated body relative to the body of the white shark.
- Bateman & Larsson (2024) describe fossil material of Otodus megalodon from Georges Bank (Nova Scotia, Canada), possibly found at or near the northern range limit of the species.
- Paredes-Aliaga & Herraiz (2024) compare tooth microwear of the Miocene Otodus megalodon and the Pliocene great white shark from Spain, and interpret the two species as likely competing for similar prey, with the tooth wear of the great white shark possibly indicating the preference for a slightly more abrasive diet.
- The first fossil tooth of a shark (great white shark) embedded in a seal bone reported to date is described from the Peace River Formation (Florida, United States) by Godfrey et al. (2024).
- Greenfield (2024) coins the name Arthrobatidae as a replacement for the invalid name of the possible batomorph family Arthropteridae.
- Capasso et al. (2024) describe rostrum of a large specimen of Onchopristis from the Maastrichtian Dakhla Formation (Egypt), providing evidence of persistence of Onchopristis in the marine environments of North Africa until the end of the Cretaceous; the assignment of this fossil material to Onchopristis is subsequently contested by Greenfield (2025) an reaffirmed by Capasso et al. (2025).
- Kocsis (2024) reviews the fossil record of Elasmobranchii from the Malay Archipelago and describes new fossils of elasmobranchs from the Miocene strata in Brunei and from the Sibuti Formation (Sarawak, Malaysia), including the first fossils of Chiloscyllium sp., cf. Hemitriakis sp., Paragaleus sp., the Borneo shark, the blacktip shark, Lamiopsis sp., Scoliodon sp. and Rhinobatos sp. from the Malay Archipelago reported to date.
- Evidence from the study of dental microwear in extant chondrichthyans, interpreted as indicating that dental microwear analysis can provide reliable information on the diet of fossil taxa, is presented by Paredes-Aliaga, Botella & Romero (2024).
- Cooper & Pimiento (2024) assess the functional diversity of sharks from 66 million years to the present using teeth, finding that shark functional diversity was high between the Palaeocene and its Miocene peak, and subsequently declined over the last 10 million years to its lowest value in the present. They interpret this decline as being due to the extinctions of functionally unique and specialised species such as †Otodus megalodon.
- Kiel et al. (2024) report the occurrence of a Late Oligocene chimaeroid egg case from deep-water deposits on the Lincoln Creek Formation, Grays Harbor County, Washington. They also put forth the argument that the oogenus Vaillantoonia Meunier, 1891 has priority over Chimaerotheca Brown, 1946 and should be used instead.

== Ray-finned fishes ==
Name	Novelty	Status	Authors	Age	Type locality	Location	Notes	Images
Afrocascudo	Gen. et sp. nov	Disputed	Brito et al.	Late Cretaceous	Kem Kem Group (Douira Formation)	Morocco	Originally described as a member of the family Loricariidae; Britz et al. (2024) considered the holotype specimen to be more likely a juvenile specimen of a species of the gar genus Obaichthys, while Brito et al. (2024) reaffirmed the original identification. The type species is A. saharaensis.	
Amakusaichthys benammii	Sp. nov		Alvarado-Ortega	Late Cretaceous (Campanian)	Tzimol Quarry	Mexico	An Ichthyodectiform.	
Amia basiloides	Sp. nov		Brownstein & Near	Paleocene	Fort Union Formation	United States (Montana)	A species of Amia.	
Angiolinia	Gen. et sp. nov	Valid	Carnevale & Tyler	Eocene	Monte Bolca Lagerstätte	Italy	A member of the family Zanclidae. The type species is A. mirabilis.	
Archaeotetraodon bemisae	Sp. nov	Valid	Bannikov & Tyler	Miocene	Maikop Group	Russia (Krasnodar Krai)	A member of the family Tetraodontidae.	
Barschichthys	Gen. et sp. nov	Valid	Arratia & Schultze	Middle Triassic (Anisian)	Muschelkalk	Germany	A member of Teleosteomorpha, the type genus of the new family Barschichthyidae. The type species is B. ruedersdorfensis.	
Beksinskiella	Gen. et comb. nov	Valid	Granica, Bieńkowska-Wasiluk & Pałdyna	Oligocene		Czech Republic; Poland; Ukraine	A member of Clupeoidei of uncertain affinities. The type species is "Meletta" longimana Heckel (1850).	
Bunocephalus serranoi	Sp. nov	Valid	Bogan & Agnolín	Miocene	Ituzaingó Formation	Argentina	A species of Bunocephalus.	
Cretapantodon	Gen. et sp. nov	Valid	Taverne	Late Cretaceous (Cenomanian)		Lebanon	A member of the family Pantodontidae. The type species is C. polli.	
Daemodontiscus	Gen. et sp. nov	Valid	Friedman et al.	Carboniferous (Kasimovian)	Atrasado Formation	United States (New Mexico)	An early ray-finned fish. The type species is D. harrisae.	
Dapalis absconditus	Sp. nov	Valid	Bradić-Milinović & Ahnelt	Oligocene		Serbia		
Dapalis octospinus	Sp. nov	Valid	Ahnelt & Bradić-Milinović	Oligocene		Serbia		
Dapalis parvus	Sp. nov	Valid	Ahnelt & Bradić-Milinović	Oligocene		Serbia		
Dapalis pauciserratus	Sp. nov	Valid	Ahnelt, Bradić-Milinović & Schwarzhans	Oligocene		Serbia		
Dapalis quintus	Sp. nov	Valid	Bradić-Milinović & Ahnelt	Oligocene		Serbia		
Eosemionotus ratumensis	Sp. nov	Valid	Diependaal et al.	Middle Triassic (Anisian)	Vossenveld Formation	Netherlands	A member of the family Macrosemiidae.	
Gregarialepis	Gen. et sp. nov	Valid	Bakaev & Sergienko in Bakaev	Permian	Leninsk Formation	Russia	A member of Elonichthyiformes. The type species is G. binaria.	
Italoelops	Gen. et sp. nov	Valid	Taverne & Capasso	Early Cretaceous (Albian)	Pietraroja Plattenkalk	Italy	A member of the family Elopidae. The type species is I. foreyi.	
Kluchevichthys	Gen. et sp. nov		Minikh et al.	Middle Permian (Guadalupian)		Russia (Tatarstan)	A member of the family Eurynotoidiidae in the order Eurynotoidiformes. The type species is K. praeclarus.	
Lates odessanus	Sp. nov		Kovalchuk et al.	Miocene		Ukraine	A species of Lates.	
Laubeichthys	Gen. et comb. nov		Reichenbacher & Přikryl	Oligocene		Czech Republic; Germany	A member of Gobioidei, possibly a member of the lineage of Pirskeniidae. The type species is "Lepidocottus" gracilis Laube (1901).	
Macroprosopon	Gen. et sp. nov	Valid	Capobianco, Zouhri & Friedman	Eocene (Ypresian)	Ouled Abdoun Basin	Morocco	A member of the family Osteoglossidae belonging to the subfamily Phareodontinae. The type species is M. hiltoni.	
Makaira adensa	Sp. nov	Valid	De Gracia et al.	Miocene	Pietra Leccese Formation	Italy	A marlin, a species of Makaira.	
Makaira cyclovata	Sp. nov	Valid	De Gracia et al.	Miocene	Pietra Leccese Formation	Italy	A marlin, a species of Makaira.	
Marcopoloichthys mirigioliensis	Sp. nov	Valid	Arratia, Bürgin & Furrer	Middle Triassic (Anisian)	Besano Formation	Switzerland	A stem teleosteomorph.	
Megalomatia	Gen. et sp. nov	Valid	Kim et al.	Late Triassic	Amisan Formation	South Korea	A basal ray-finned fish. The type species is M. minima.	
Mengius	Gen. et sp. nov	Valid	Thies, Stevens & Ansorge	Early Jurassic (Toarcian)	Grimmen Formation	Germany	A member of the family Lepidotidae. The type species is M. acutidens.	
Mesolepis arabellae	Sp. nov		Elliott & Giles	Carboniferous (Bashkirian)	Scottish Lower Coal Measure Formation	United Kingdom	A member of Eurynotiformes.	
Mioscomber	Gen. et comb. nov	Valid	Bannikov & Erebakan	Miocene		Croatia; Russia	A member of the family Scombridae. The type species is "Auxis" caucasica Bogachev (1933); genus also includes "Auxis" vrabcensis Kramberger (1882), "A." thynnoides Kramberger (1882) and "Scomber" sujedanus Steindachner (1860).	
Miovalencia	Gen. et sp. et comb. nov	Valid	Mainero, Vasilyan & Reichenbacher	Miocene		Bosnia and Herzegovina; France; Greece	A member of the family Valenciidae. The type species is M. bugojnensis; genus also includes M. chios (Malz, 1978) and M. angulosa (Steurbaut, 1978).	
Nasrinsotoudehichthys	Gen. et comb. nov	Valid	Ebert & López-Arbarello	Late Jurassic (Tithonian)	Zandt Basin	Germany	A member of Caturoidea of uncertain affinities. The type species is "Liodesmus" sprattiformis Wagner (1863).	
Perledovatus	Gen. et comb. nov	Valid	López-Arbarello & Brocke	Middle Triassic (Ladinian)	Perledo-Varenna Formation	Italy	A member of Halecomorphi belonging to the family Subortichthyidae. The type species is "Allolepidotus" nothosomoides Deecke (1889).	
Pizzikoskerma	Gen. et sp. nov	Valid	De Gracia et al.	Miocene	Pietra Leccese Formation	Italy	A marlin. The type species is P. salentina.	
Planalepis	Gen. et sp. nov	Valid	Bakaev & Sergienko in Bakaev	Permian	Tailugan Formation	Russia	A member of Elonichthyiformes. The type species is P. diserta.	
Pogonias blettleri	Sp. nov	Valid	Noriega et al.	Miocene	Paraná Formation	Argentina	A species of Pogonias.	
Protosphyraena terminalis	Sp. nov		Kanarkina, Zverkov & Polyakova	Late Cretaceous (Maastrichtian)		Belgium		
Pseudopholidoctenus	Gen. et sp. nov	Valid	Arratia & Schultze	Middle Triassic (Anisian)	Muschelkalk	Germany	A member of the family Pholidophoridae. The type species is P. germanicus.	
Ruedersdorfia	Gen. et sp. nov	Valid	Arratia & Schultze	Middle Triassic (Anisian)	Muschelkalk	Germany	A member of Teleosteomorpha of uncertain affinities. The type species is R. berlinensis.	
Sanalosa	Gen. et sp. nov		Bienkowska-Wasiluk, Granica & Kovalchuk	Oligocene (Rupelian)	Menilite Formation	Poland	A member of the family Alosidae. The type species is S. janulosa.	
Sicophasma	Gen. et sp. nov	Valid	De Gracia et al.	Miocene	Pietra Leccese Formation	Italy	A marlin. The type species is S. macrocanalata.	
Simpsonigobius	Gen. et sp. nov	Valid	Dirnberger, Bauer & Reichenbacher	Miocene	Zeytindağ Group	Turkey	A member of Gobiiformes. The type species is S. nerimanae.	
Stambergichthys	Gen. et sp. nov	Valid	Barták et al.	Carboniferous (Moscovian)	Kladno Formation	Czech Republic	An early ray-finned fish. The type species is S. macrodens.	
Stereolepis arcanum	Sp. nov	Valid	Přikryl & Lin in Přikryl et al.	Pliocene	Upper Kueichulin Formation	Taiwan	A species of Stereolepis.	
Teffichthys wui	Sp. nov	Valid	Xu et al.	Early Triassic (Olenekian)	Lower Qinglong Formation	China		
Toarcocephalus	Gen. et sp. nov	Valid	Cooper, López-Arbarello & Maxwell	Early Jurassic (Toarcian)	Posidonia Shale	Germany	A member of the family Coccolepididae. The type species is T. morlok.	
Vinciguerria shinjiensis	Sp. nov		Yabumoto, Nomura & Nazarkin	Miocene	Kuri Formation	Japan	A species of Vinciguerria.	
Wilsonilebias	Gen. et 2 sp. nov	Valid	Mainero, Vasilyan & Reichenbacher	Miocene		Bosnia and Herzegovina	A member of the family Valenciidae. The type species is W. langhianus; genus also includes W. rotundascendus.	
Xeneichthys	Gen. et sp. nov	Valid	Arratia & González-Rodríguez	Early Cretaceous (Albian)	El Doctor Formation	Mexico	A member of Euteleosteomorpha of uncertain phylogenetic placement. The type species is X. yanesi.	

=== Otolith taxa ===
Name	Novelty	Status	Authors	Age	Type locality	Location	Notes	Images
Acromycter gratus	Sp. nov	Valid	Schwarzhans, Stringer & Takeuchi	Eocene (Lutetian)	Ardath Shale	United States (California)	A species of Acromycter.	
Advenasciaena	Gen. et sp. nov	Valid	Kocsis et al.	Miocene	Miri Formation	Brunei	A member of the family Sciaenidae. The type species is A. bruneiana.	
Akko canoa	Sp. nov		Schwarzhans & Aguilera	Pleistocene (Gelasian)	Canoa Formation	Ecuador	A species of Akko.	
Akko lobata	Sp. nov		Schwarzhans & Aguilera	Miocene (Tortonian)	Yaviza Formation	Panama	A species of Akko.	
Alienocarapus	Gen. et sp. nov	Valid	Schwarzhans, Stringer & Takeuchi	Eocene (Bartonian)	Mission Valley Formation	United States (California)	A member of the subfamily Carapinae. The type species is A. banana.	
Ambassis californiensis	Sp. nov	Valid	Schwarzhans, Stringer & Takeuchi	Eocene (Lutetian)	Ardath Shale	United States (California)	A species of Ambassis.	
Ampheristus brevicaudatus	Sp. nov	Valid	Lin, Steurbaut & Nolf	Eocene	Nanjemoy Formation	United States (Alabama; Maryland; Virginia)	A cusk-eel.	
Ampheristus turgidus	Sp. nov	Valid	Schwarzhans, Stringer & Takeuchi	Eocene (Lutetian)	Ardath Shale	United States (California)	A cusk-eel.	
Antigonia transpacifica	Sp. nov	Valid	Schwarzhans, Stringer & Takeuchi	Eocene (Lutetian)	Ardath Shale	United States (California)	A species of Antigonia.	
Antilligobius collinsae	Sp. nov		Schwarzhans & Aguilera	Miocene (Tortonian) to Pleistocene (Gelasian)	Escudo de Veraguas Formation	Costa Rica; Ecuador; Panama; Trinidad and Tobago; Venezuela	A species of Antilligobius.	
Apletodon conwayi	Sp. nov	Valid	Schwarzhans, Klots & Kovalchuk in Schwarzhans et al.	Miocene		Ukraine	A species of Apletodon.	
Archaeotolithus eiggensis	Sp. nov		Schwarzhans & Wakefield	Middle Jurassic (Bathonian)	Lealt Shale	United Kingdom		
Archaeotolithus invernizziae	Sp. nov		Schwarzhans & Wakefield	Middle Jurassic (Bathonian)	Lealt Shale	United Kingdom		
Ariosoma ceppiensis	Sp. nov	Valid	Schwarzhans & Carnevale	Miocene (Burdigalian)		Italy	A species of Ariosoma.	
Arnoglossus dispar	Sp. nov	Valid	Schwarzhans, Klots & Kovalchuk in Schwarzhans et al.	Miocene		Ukraine	A scaldfish.	
Aruma atlantica	Sp. nov		Schwarzhans & Aguilera	Pliocene (Piacenzian) to Pleistocene (Calabrian)	Bastimentos Formation	Panama	A species of Aruma.	
Atrobucca borneensis	Sp. nov	Valid	Kocsis et al.	Miocene	Seria Formation	Brunei	A species of Atrobucca.	
Avitamugil	Gen. et sp. et comb. nov	Valid	Schwarzhans, Stringer & Takeuchi	Eocene	Ardath Shale	United Kingdom; United States (California)	A mullet. The type species is A. scrippsi; genus also includes "Pentanemus" constrictus Stinton (1984).	
Baobythites	Gen. et sp. et comb. nov	Valid	Schwarzhans, Stringer & Takeuchi	Eocene	Ardath Shale	France; United States (Alabama; California; Mississippi; Texas)	A cusk-eel. The type species is B. pacificus; genus also includes "aff. Glyptophidium" stringeri Lin & Nolf (2022) and "Ophidium" biarritzense Sulc (1932).	
Barbulifer amplus	Sp. nov		Schwarzhans & Aguilera	Pleistocene (Gelasian and Calabrian)	Swan Cay Formation	Panama	A species of Barbulifer.	
Bathycongrus delfinoi	Sp. nov	Valid	Schwarzhans & Carnevale	Miocene (Burdigalian)		Italy	A species of Bathycongrus.	
Bauzaia gibbosa	Sp. nov	Valid	Lin, Steurbaut & Nolf	Eocene	Nanjemoy Formation	United States (Maryland)	A cusk-eel.	
Bollmannia angosturae	Sp. nov		Schwarzhans & Aguilera	Miocene (Tortonian and Messinian)	Angostura Formation	Ecuador; Panama	A species of Bollmannia.	
Bollmannia baldwinae	Sp. nov		Schwarzhans & Aguilera	Miocene (Langhian to Messinian)	Yaviza Formation	Panama; Trinidad and Tobago; Venezuela	A species of Bollmannia.	
Bollmannia cubaguana	Sp. nov		Schwarzhans & Aguilera	Pliocene (Zanclean)	Cubagua Formation	Venezuela	A species of Bollmannia.	
Bollmannia ornatissima	Sp. nov		Schwarzhans & Aguilera	Miocene (Tortonian and Messinian)	Yaviza Formation	Panama; Trinidad and Tobago	A species of Bollmannia.	
Bollmannia? paraguanaensis	Sp. nov		Schwarzhans & Aguilera	Miocene (Burdigalian)	Cantaure Formation	Panama; Venezuela	Possibly a species of Bollmannia.	
Bollmannia propensa	Sp. nov		Schwarzhans & Aguilera	Miocene (Tortonian and Messinian)	Onzole Formation	Ecuador; Panama	A species of Bollmannia.	
Bollmannia trinidadensis	Sp. nov		Schwarzhans & Aguilera	Miocene (Burdigalian and Langhian)	Brasso Formation	Trinidad and Tobago; Venezuela	A species of Bollmannia.	
Bollmannia venezuelana	Sp. nov		Schwarzhans & Aguilera	Miocene (Langhian to Tortonian)	Ojo de Agua Formation	Trinidad and Tobago; Venezuela	A species of Bollmannia.	
Brassoichthys	Gen. et sp. nov		Schwarzhans & Aguilera	Miocene (Langhian)	Brasso Formation	Trinidad and Tobago	A goby. The type species is B. tornabenei.	
Bregmaceros moersi	Sp. nov	Valid	Schwarzhans, Stringer & Takeuchi	Eocene (Bartonian and Priabonian)	Yazoo Formation	United States (Mississippi; Texas)	A codlet.	
Bruneisciaena	Gen. et sp. nov	Valid	Kocsis et al.	Miocene	Miri Formation	Brunei	A member of the family Sciaenidae. The type species is B. schwarzhansi.	
Buenia gibba	Sp. nov	Valid	Schwarzhans, Klots & Kovalchuk in Schwarzhans et al.	Miocene		Ukraine	A species of Buenia.	
Centroberyx predorsalis	Sp. nov	Valid	Schwarzhans, Stringer & Takeuchi	Eocene (Lutetian and Bartonian)	Mission Valley Formation	United States (California)	A species of Centroberyx.	
Centroberyx pseudopulcher	Sp. nov	Valid	Schwarzhans, Stringer & Takeuchi	Eocene (Lutetian and Bartonian)	Ardath Shale	United States (California)	A species of Centroberyx.	
Cepola macilenta	Sp. nov	Valid	Schwarzhans & Carnevale	Miocene (Burdigalian)		Italy	A species of Cepola.	
Chriolepis altus	Sp. nov		Schwarzhans & Aguilera	Miocene (Tortonian)	Yaviza Formation	Panama	A species of Chriolepis.	
Chriolepis balboa	Sp. nov		Schwarzhans & Aguilera	Miocene (Tortonian)	Angostura Formation	Ecuador; Panama	A species of Chriolepis.	
"Conger" biaculeatus	Sp. nov	Valid	Lin, Steurbaut & Nolf	Eocene	Bashi Formation	United States (Alabama)	A member of the family Congridae.	
Coryphaenoides delapierrei	Sp. nov	Valid	Schwarzhans & Carnevale	Miocene (Burdigalian)		Italy	A species of Coryphaenoides.	
Coryphopterus cuevae	Sp. nov		Schwarzhans & Aguilera	Miocene (Tortonian)	Tuira Formation	Panama	A species of Coryphopterus.	
Coryphopterus rodriguezi	Sp. nov		Schwarzhans & Aguilera	Miocene (Tortonian and Messinian)	Chucunaque Formation	Panama	A species of Coryphopterus.	
Coryphopterus xenosus	Sp. nov		Schwarzhans & Aguilera	Miocene (Messinian) and Pliocene (Zanclean)	Cubagua Formation	Trinidad and Tobago; Venezuela	A species of Coryphopterus.	
Ctenogobius darienensis	Sp. nov		Schwarzhans & Aguilera	Miocene (Tortonian)	Yaviza Formation	Panama	A species of Ctenogobius.	
Cubaguanichthys	Gen. et sp. nov		Schwarzhans & Aguilera	Pliocene (Zanclean)	Cubagua Formation	Venezuela	A goby. The type species is C. lanceolatus.	
Cubiceps lautus	Sp. nov	Valid	Schwarzhans, Stringer & Takeuchi	Eocene (Lutetian)	Ardath Shale	United States (California)	A species of Cubiceps.	
Diaphus cuneatus	Sp. nov	Valid	Schwarzhans & Carnevale	Miocene (Burdigalian)		Italy	A species of Diaphus.	
Diaphus hastaensis	Sp. nov	Valid	Schwarzhans & Carnevale	Oligocene (Chattian)		Italy	A species of Diaphus.	
Diaphus ichishiensis	Sp. nov	Valid	Tsuchiya et al.	Miocene		Japan	A species of Diaphus.	
Diaphus pertinax	Sp. nov	Valid	Schwarzhans & Carnevale	Miocene (Burdigalian)		Italy	A species of Diaphus.	
Diaphus roederi	Sp. nov	Valid	Schwarzhans, Stringer & Takeuchi	Eocene (Lutetian)	Ardath Shale	United States (California)	A species of Diaphus.	
Diretmus fidelis	Sp. nov	Valid	Schwarzhans, Stringer & Takeuchi	Eocene (Lutetian)	Ardath Shale	United States (California)	A species of Diretmus.	
Electolapis	Gen. et comb. nov	Valid	Schwarzhans, Stringer & Takeuchi	Eocene		Belgium; France; United Kingdom; United States (California)	A teleost of uncertain phylogenetic placement. The type species is "Ambassis" electilis Stinton & Nolf (1970); genus also includes "genus Gerreidarum" aquitanicus Nolf (1988).	
Encheliophis transversalis	Sp. nov	Valid	Schwarzhans, Stringer & Takeuchi	Eocene (Lutetian)	Ardath Shale	United States (California)	A species of Encheliophis.	
Eobidenichthys	Gen. et comb. nov	Valid	Schwarzhans, Stringer & Takeuchi	Late Cretaceous (Campanian and Maastichtian) to Oligocene		Belgium; France; Germany; Netherlands; Ukraine; United Kingdom; United States (Alabama; California)	A viviparous brotula. The type species is "Otolithus (Ophidiidarum)" symmetricus Frost (1934); genus also includes Eobidenichthys crepidatus (Voigt, 1926), Eobidenichthys lapierrei (Nolf, 1978), Eobidenichthys midwayensis (Nolf & Docker, 1993) and Eobidenichthys boscheineni (Schwarzhans, 1994).	
Eokrefftia paviai	Sp. nov	Valid	Schwarzhans & Carnevale	Oligocene (Chattian)		Italy	A lanternfish belonging to the subfamily Eomyctophinae.	
Eophichthus	Gen. et 2 sp. nov	Valid	Schwarzhans, Stringer & Takeuchi	Eocene (Lutetian and Bartonian), possibly also Oligocene	Ardath Shale	United States (California)	A member of the family Ophichthidae. The type species is E. ardathensis; genus also includes E. gracilis and possibly also "Conger" brevior Koken (1888).	
Eopterois	Gen. et sp. nov	Valid	Schwarzhans, Stringer & Takeuchi	Eocene		United States (Mississippi)	A member of the family Scorpaenidae belonging to the tribe Pteroini. The type species is E. bandeli.	
Epigonus liguriensis	Sp. nov	Valid	Schwarzhans & Carnevale	Miocene (Burdigalian)		Italy	A species of Epigonus.	
Evermannia chiriquiensis	Sp. nov		Schwarzhans & Aguilera	Pliocene (Zanclean)	Cayo Agua Formation	Panama	A species of Evermannia.	
Evermannia? problematica	Sp. nov		Schwarzhans & Aguilera	Miocene (Burdigalian and Tortonian)	Cantaure Formation	Panama; Venezuela	Possibly a species of Evermannia.	
Fitchichthys	Gen. et sp. et comb. nov	Valid	Schwarzhans, Stringer & Takeuchi	Eocene	Ardath Shale	Germany; United States (California)	A teleost of uncertain phylogenetic placement. The type species is F. placidus; genus also includes Macroramphosidarum testuliformis Schwarzhans (2007).	
Gillichthys caribbaeus	Sp. nov		Schwarzhans & Aguilera	Miocene (Tortonian)	Manzanilla Formation	Trinidad and Tobago	A species of Gillichthys.	
Giuntellia	Gen. et sp. nov	Valid	Schwarzhans & Carnevale	Miocene (Burdigalian)		Italy	A member of the family Gobiidae. The type species is G. singularis.	
Glyptophidium monoceros	Sp. nov	Valid	Schwarzhans & Carnevale	Miocene (Langhian)		Czech Republic; Italy	A species of Glyptophidium.	
Gnatholepis gunae	Sp. nov		Schwarzhans & Aguilera	Miocene (Tortonian)	Gatun Formation	Panama	A species of Gnatholepis.	
Gnathophis frizzelli	Sp. nov	Valid	Schwarzhans, Stringer & Takeuchi	Eocene (Bartonian)	Mission Valley Formation	United States (California)	A species of Gnathophis.	
Gobiosoma emberae	Sp. nov		Schwarzhans & Aguilera	Miocene (Messinian)	Chucunaque Formation	Panama	A species of Gobiosoma.	
Gobulus limonensis	Sp. nov		Schwarzhans & Aguilera	Pleistocene (Gelasian)	Moin Formation	Costa Rica	A species of Gobulus.	
"Haemulon" ypresiensis	Sp. nov	Valid	Lin, Steurbaut & Nolf	Eocene	Nanjemoy Formation	United States (Alabama; Maryland; Mississippi; Virginia)	A member of the family Haemulidae.	
Hoplobrotula panicula	Sp. nov	Valid	Schwarzhans, Stringer & Takeuchi	Eocene (Bartonian)	Mission Valley Formation	United States (California)	A species of Hoplobrotula.	
Hoplunnis diagonalis	Sp. nov	Valid	Schwarzhans, Stringer & Takeuchi	Eocene (Lutetian)	Ardath Shale	United States (California)	A species of Hoplunnis.	
Huddlestonichthys	Gen. et sp. nov	Valid	Schwarzhans, Stringer & Takeuchi	Eocene (Lutetian)	Ardath Shale	United States (California)	A bonefish. The type species is H. profundicauda.	
Ilypnus arayanensis	Sp. nov		Schwarzhans & Aguilera	Pliocene (Zanclean)	Cubagua Formation	Venezuela	A species of Ilypnus.	
Ipaimuraena	Gen. et 2 sp. nov	Valid	Schwarzhans, Stringer & Takeuchi	Eocene (Lutetian and Bartonian)	Ardath Shale	United States (California; Mississippi)	A member of the family Ophichthidae. The type species is I. californiensis; genus also includes I. fusiformis.	
Japonoconger asper	Sp. nov	Valid	Schwarzhans & Carnevale	Miocene (Burdigalian)		Italy	A species of Japonoconger.	
Lampanyctus rostratus	Sp. nov	Valid	Schwarzhans & Carnevale	Oligocene (Chattian)		Italy	A species of Lampanyctus.	
Leptolepis flexuosus	Sp. nov		Schwarzhans & Wakefield	Middle Jurassic (Bathonian)	Lealt Shale	United Kingdom		
Leptolepis skyensis	Sp. nov		Schwarzhans & Wakefield	Middle Jurassic (Bathonian)	Lealt Shale	United Kingdom		
Liparomorphus	Gen. et sp. nov	Valid	Schwarzhans, Stringer & Takeuchi	Eocene (Lutetian)	Ardath Shale	United States (California)	A possible snailfish. The type species is L. gerringerae.	
Magnogobius	Gen. et 2 sp. nov		Schwarzhans & Aguilera	Miocene (Tortonian) to Pleistocene (Gelasian)	Cercado Formation	Costa Rica; Dominican Republic; Panama	A goby. The type species is M. grandis; genus also includes M. costaricensis.	
Malacanthus? rugosus	Sp. nov	Valid	Schwarzhans, Stringer & Takeuchi	Eocene (Lutetian)	Ardath Shale	United States (California)	A tilefish of uncertain generic placement.	
Merluccius aequipar	Sp. nov	Valid	Schwarzhans	Miocene		Austria; Germany	A species of Merluccius.	
Merluccius kokeni	Sp. nov	Valid	Schwarzhans	Miocene		Austria; Germany; Netherlands	A species of Merluccius.	
Merluccius leptus	Sp. nov	Valid	Schwarzhans	Miocene		Austria; Italy?	A species of Merluccius.	
Microgobius aphioides	Sp. nov		Schwarzhans & Aguilera	Pliocene (Zanclean)	Cubagua Formation	Panama; Trinidad and Tobago; Venezuela	A species of Microgobius.	
Microgobius camur	Sp. nov		Schwarzhans & Aguilera	Pliocene (Zanclean) to Pleistocene (Calabrian)	Escudo de Veraguas Formation	Costa Rica; Panama	A species of Microgobius.	
Microgobius cantaurensis	Sp. nov		Schwarzhans & Aguilera	Miocene (Burdigalian to Tortonian)	Cantaure Formation	Panama; Venezuela	A species of Microgobius.	
Microgobius chocorum	Sp. nov		Schwarzhans & Aguilera	Miocene (Tortonian)	Tuira Formation	Panama; Trinidad and Tobago	A species of Microgobius.	
Microgobius cumana	Sp. nov		Schwarzhans & Aguilera	Pleistocene (Calabrian)	Cumaná Formation	Venezuela	A species of Microgobius.	
Microgobius ecuadorensis	Sp. nov		Schwarzhans & Aguilera	Miocene (Tortonian)	Angostura Formation	Ecuador; Panama	A species of Microgobius.	
Microgobius glaber	Sp. nov		Schwarzhans & Aguilera	Miocene (Tortonian and Messinian)	Manzanilla Formation	Dominican Republic; Panama; Trinidad and Tobago	A species of Microgobius.	
Microgobius pezoldi	Sp. nov		Schwarzhans & Aguilera	Miocene (Tortonian and Messinian)	Chucunaque Formation	Costa Rica; Ecuador; Panama; Trinidad and Tobago	A species of Microgobius.	
Microgobius pirabasensis	Sp. nov		Schwarzhans & Aguilera	Miocene (Aquitanian to Burdigalian)	Pirabas Formation	Brazil	A species of Microgobius.	
Microgobius praeglaber	Sp. nov		Schwarzhans & Aguilera	Miocene (Langhian to Tortonian)	Brasso Formation	Panama; Trinidad and Tobago	A species of Microgobius.	
Microgobius robertsoni	Sp. nov		Schwarzhans & Aguilera	Miocene (Aquitanian to Burdigalian)	Cantaure Formation	Brazil; Dominican Republic; Trinidad and Tobago; Venezuela	A species of Microgobius.	
Microgobius rohri	Sp. nov		Schwarzhans & Aguilera	Miocene (Burdigalian)	Brasso Formation	Trinidad and Tobago	A species of Microgobius.	
Microgobius verecundus	Sp. nov		Schwarzhans & Aguilera	Miocene (Tortonian to Messinian)	Tuira Formation	Ecuador; Panama; Trinidad and Tobago	A species of Microgobius.	
Micropomadasys	Gen. et sp. nov	Valid	Schwarzhans, Stringer & Takeuchi	Eocene (Lutetian)	Ardath Shale	United States (California)	A member of the family Haemulidae. The type species is M. granulosus.	
Myctophum isense	Sp. nov	Valid	Tsuchiya et al.	Miocene		Japan	A species of Myctophum.	
Neobythites longesulcatus	Sp. nov	Valid	Lin, Steurbaut & Nolf	Eocene	Nanjemoy Formation	United States (Maryland; Virginia)	A cusk-eel, a species of Neobythites.	
"Neobythites" pamunkeyensis	Sp. nov	Valid	Lin, Steurbaut & Nolf	Eocene	Nanjemoy Formation	United States (Virginia)	A cusk-eel.	
"Neobythites" stringeri	Sp. nov	Valid	Lin, Steurbaut & Nolf	Eocene	Hatchetigbee Bluff Formation	United States (Alabama)	A cusk-eel.	
Nezumia armentrouti	Sp. nov		Stringer & Welton	Oligocene	Lincoln Creek Formation	United States (Washington)	A species of Nezumia.	
Nezumia marramai	Sp. nov	Valid	Schwarzhans & Carnevale	Oligocene (Chattian)		Italy	A species of Nezumia.	
Nibea ambugensis	Sp. nov	Valid	Kocsis et al.	Miocene	Seria Formation	Brunei	A species of Nibea.	
Nibea stintoni	Sp. nov	Valid	Kocsis et al.	Miocene	Miri Formation	Brunei	A species of Nibea.	
Owstonia rhomboidea	Sp. nov	Valid	Schwarzhans & Carnevale	Miocene (Burdigalian)		Italy	A species of Owstonia.	
Palaeolebias winogradskyi	Sp. nov	Valid	Schwarzhans, Klots & Kovalchuk in Schwarzhans et al.	Miocene		Ukraine	A pupfish.	
Palatogobius magnus	Sp. nov		Schwarzhans & Aguilera	Pliocene (Zanclean)	Cayo Agua Formation	Panama	A species of Palatogobius.	
Palatogobius pacificus	Sp. nov		Schwarzhans & Aguilera	Pleistocene (Calabrian)	Armuelles Formation	Panama	A species of Palatogobius.	
Palatogobius vantasselli	Sp. nov		Schwarzhans & Aguilera	Miocene (Tortonian and Messinian)	Manzanilla Formation	Trinidad and Tobago	A species of Palatogobius.	
Paracarapus californiensis	Sp. nov	Valid	Schwarzhans, Stringer & Takeuchi	Eocene (Bartonian)	Mission Valley Formation	United States (California)	A member of the subfamily Carapinae.	
Paralabrax nolfi	Sp. nov	Valid	Schwarzhans, Stringer & Takeuchi	Eocene (Lutetian)		Belgium	A species of Paralabrax.	
Parascombrops fragilis	Sp. nov	Valid	Schwarzhans, Stringer & Takeuchi	Eocene (Lutetian)	Ardath Shale	United States (California)	A species of Parascombrops.	
Parrella lucida	Sp. nov		Schwarzhans & Aguilera	Pliocene (Zanclean)	Manzanilla Formation	Trinidad and Tobago; Venezuela	A species of Parrella.	
Pauxillibrotula	Gen. et comb. nov	Valid	Schwarzhans, Stringer & Takeuchi	Eocene		France; United States (California)	A cusk-eel. The type species is "genus Neobythitinorum" dolinorum Nolf (1988).	
Peprilus? muelleri	Sp. nov	Valid	Schwarzhans, Stringer & Takeuchi	Eocene (Bartonian)	Mission Valley Formation	United States (California)	Possibly a species of Peprilus.	
Phycis harzhauseri	Sp. nov	Valid	Schwarzhans	Miocene		Austria	A species of Phycis.	
Phycis pericarpathicus	Sp. nov	Valid	Schwarzhans	Miocene		Poland	A species of Phycis.	
Phycis tortoniensis	Sp. nov	Valid	Schwarzhans	Miocene		Italy	A species of Phycis.	
Platygonostoma	Gen. et comb. nov	Valid	Schwarzhans, Stringer & Takeuchi	Eocene		France; United States (California)	A member of the family Sternoptychidae. The type species is "Danaphos" gibbsi Nolf (1988).	
Plesiolithus	Gen. et sp. nov	Valid	Schwarzhans, Stringer & Takeuchi	Eocene (Lutetian)	Ardath Shale	United States (California)	A teleost of uncertain phylogenetic placement. The type species is P. inornatus.	
Polyipnus apicalis	Sp. nov	Valid	Schwarzhans, Stringer & Takeuchi	Eocene (Lutetian)	Ardath Shale	United States (California)	A species of Polyipnus.	
Porrolapis	Gen. et comb. nov	Valid	Schwarzhans, Stringer & Takeuchi	Eocene		France; United States (California)	A teleost of uncertain phylogenetic placement. The type species is "genus Cyprinodontoideorum" ornatissimus Nolf (1988).	
Praearchirolithus altus	Sp. nov	Valid	Schwarzhans, Stringer & Takeuchi	Eocene (Lutetian and Bartonian)	Mission Valley Formation	United States (California)	A member of the family Soleidae.	
Praearchirolithus confusus	Sp. nov	Valid	Schwarzhans, Stringer & Takeuchi	Eocene (Lutetian and Bartonian)	Mission Valley Formation	United States (California)	A member of the family Soleidae.	
Prionotus kieli	Sp. nov	Valid	Schwarzhans, Stringer & Takeuchi	Eocene (Priabonian)	Yazoo Clay	United States (Mississippi)	A species of Prionotus.	
Progonostoma torreyensis	Sp. nov	Valid	Schwarzhans, Stringer & Takeuchi	Eocene (Lutetian)	Ardath Shale	United States (California)	A member of the family Gonostomatidae.	
Proparrella	Gen. et 2 sp. nov		Schwarzhans & Aguilera	Miocene (Tortonian) to Pliocene (Zanclean)	Tuira Formation	Ecuador; Panama; Trinidad and Tobago; Venezuela	A goby. The type species is P. darienensis; genus also includes P. pusilla.	
Protanago	Gen. et comb. et sp. nov	Valid	Schwarzhans, Stringer & Takeuchi	Eocene		Italy; United States	A member of the family Congridae. The type species is "Otolithus (Platessae)" sector Koken (1888); genus also includes "Parbatmya" brazosensis Dante & Frizzell (1965), "Ariosoma" nonsector Nolf & Stringer (2003) "Paraconger" solidus Müller (1999) and "Paraconger" wechesensis Lin & Nolf (2022), as well as new species P. miramarensis.	
Protaulopus	Gen. et comb. nov	Valid	Schwarzhans, Stringer & Takeuchi	Eocene		France; United States (California)	A member of the family Aulopidae. The type species is "genus Percoideorum" pseudolestidiops Nolf (1988).	
Protobembrops	Gen. et comb. et sp. nov	Valid	Schwarzhans, Stringer & Takeuchi	Eocene		Belgium; France; United Kingdom; United States	A member of the family Trichonotidae. The type species is "Trachinus" laevigatus Koken (1888); genus also includes "Trachinus" janeti Priem (1911), as well as new species P. ascensus.	
Protonibea nolfi	Sp. nov	Valid	Kocsis et al.	Miocene	Miri Formation	Brunei	A species of Protonibea.	
Protopomadasys	Gen. et 2 sp. nov	Valid	Schwarzhans, Stringer & Takeuchi	Eocene (Lutetian and Bartonian)	Mission Valley Formation	United States (California)	A member of the family Haemulidae. The type species is P. fitchi; genus also includes P. pacificus.	
Pseudobrotulina	Gen. et sp. nov	Valid	Schwarzhans, Stringer & Takeuchi	Eocene (Lutetian)	Ardath Shale	United States (California)	A viviparous brotula. The type species is P. fitchi.	
Pseudolabrax	Gen. et sp. nov	Valid	Schwarzhans, Stringer & Takeuchi	Eocene (Lutetian and Bartonian)	Mission Valley Formation	United States (California)	A member of the family Serranidae. The type species is P. missionis.	
Ptereleotris tectus	Sp. nov	Valid	Schwarzhans, Klots & Kovalchuk in Schwarzhans et al.	Miocene		Ukraine	A species of Ptereleotris.	
Quietula rueberi	Sp. nov		Schwarzhans & Aguilera	Miocene (Tortonian)	Manzanilla Formation	Trinidad and Tobago	A species of Quietula.	
Saccogaster salebrosus	Sp. nov	Valid	Schwarzhans, Stringer & Takeuchi	Eocene (Lutetian)	Ardath Shale	United States (California)	A species of Saccogaster.	
Sarmatigobius cavatus	Sp. nov	Valid	Schwarzhans, Klots & Kovalchuk in Schwarzhans et al.	Miocene		Ukraine	A member of the family Gobiidae belonging to the Aphia lineage.	
Scombrops americanus	Sp. nov	Valid	Schwarzhans, Stringer & Takeuchi	Eocene (Lutetian)	Ardath Shale	United States (California)	A gnomefish.	
Scorpaenodes acronis	Sp. nov	Valid	Schwarzhans, Stringer & Takeuchi	Eocene (Lutetian)	Ardath Shale	United States (California)	A species of Scorpaenodes.	
Scorpaenodes huddlestoni	Sp. nov	Valid	Schwarzhans, Stringer & Takeuchi	Eocene	Ardath Shale	United States (California)	A species of Scorpaenodes.	
Scorpaenodes starnesi	Sp. nov	Valid	Schwarzhans, Stringer & Takeuchi	Eocene (Lutetian)	Ardath Shale	United States (California)	A species of Scorpaenodes.	
Scythogobius minimus	Sp. nov	Valid	Schwarzhans, Klots & Kovalchuk in Schwarzhans et al.	Miocene		Ukraine	A member of the family Gobiidae belonging to the Benthophilus lineage.	
Serranus? fongeri	Sp. nov	Valid	Schwarzhans, Stringer & Takeuchi	Eocene (Lutetian and Bartonian)	Ardath Shale	United States (California)	A member of the family Serranidae of uncertain generic placement.	
Serranus? moratus	Sp. nov	Valid	Schwarzhans, Stringer & Takeuchi	Eocene (Lutetian and Bartonian)	Ardath Shale	United States (California)	A member of the family Serranidae of uncertain generic placement.	
Serranus? strigosus	Sp. nov	Valid	Schwarzhans, Stringer & Takeuchi	Eocene (Lutetian and Bartonian)	Mission Valley Formation	United States (California)	A member of the family Serranidae of uncertain generic placement.	
Sirembrotula	Gen. et sp. nov	Valid	Schwarzhans, Stringer & Takeuchi	Eocene (Lutetian)	Ardath Shale	United States (California)	A cusk-eel. The type species is S. mediator.	
Sparus? sparsus	Sp. nov	Valid	Schwarzhans, Stringer & Takeuchi	Eocene (Lutetian)	Ardath Shale	United States (California)	A member of the family Sparidae of uncertain generic placement.	
Strongylauris	Gen. et comb. nov	Valid	Schwarzhans, Stringer & Takeuchi	Eocene		United States	A member of the family Haemulidae. The type species is genus aff. Xenistius obliquus Müller (1999).	
Symmetrosulcus virginicus	Sp. nov	Valid	Lin, Steurbaut & Nolf	Eocene	Nanjemoy Formation	United States (Alabama; Maryland; Virginia)	A cusk-eel.	
Syngnathus vesculus	Sp. nov	Valid	Schwarzhans, Klots & Kovalchuk in Schwarzhans et al.	Miocene		Ukraine	A species of Syngnathus.	
Synodus diadematus	Sp. nov	Valid	Schwarzhans, Stringer & Takeuchi	Eocene (Bartonian)	Moodys Branch Formation	United States (Mississippi)	A species of Synodus.	
Synodus moodyensis	Sp. nov	Valid	Schwarzhans, Stringer & Takeuchi	Eocene (Bartonian and Priabonian)	Moodys Branch Formation	United States (Mississippi (Texas)	A species of Synodus.	
Torreyichthys	Gen. et sp. nov	Valid	Schwarzhans, Stringer & Takeuchi	Eocene (Lutetian)	Ardath Shale	United States (California)	A member of the family Serranidae. The type species is T. speciosus.	
Umbra euronota	Sp. nov	Valid	Schwarzhans, Klots & Kovalchuk in Schwarzhans et al.	Miocene		Ukraine	A species of Umbra.	
Uranoscopus? lini	Sp. nov	Valid	Schwarzhans, Stringer & Takeuchi	Eocene (Lutetian)	Ardath Shale	United States (California)	A stargazer of uncertain generic placement.	
Uroconger priscus	Sp. nov	Valid	Schwarzhans, Stringer & Takeuchi	Eocene (Bartonian)	Mission Valley Formation	United States (California)	A species of Uroconger.	
Varicus pliocenicus	Sp. nov		Schwarzhans & Aguilera	Pliocene (Zanclean)	Cubagua Formation	Venezuela	A species of Varicus.	
Verilus lajollaensis	Sp. nov	Valid	Schwarzhans, Stringer & Takeuchi	Eocene (Lutetian)	Ardath Shale	United States (California)	A species of Verilus.	
Vinciguerria rotunda	Sp. nov	Valid	Tsuchiya et al.	Miocene		Japan	A species of Vinciguerria.	
Waitakia dorsogibbosa	Sp. nov	Valid	Lin, Steurbaut & Nolf	Eocene	Nanjemoy Formation	United States (Maryland; Virginia)	A member of the family Percophidae belonging to the subfamily Hemerocoetinae.	

=== Ray-finned fish research ===
- New, rank-free classification of extant and extinct ray-finned fishes is presented by Near & Thacker (2024).
- Dankina, Šečkus & Plax (2024) describe new fossil material of ray-finned fishes from the Devonian (Eifelian and Givetian) strata in Belarus and Lithuania, including scales of members of the genera Cheirolepis and Orvikuina, and improving biostratigraphic correlations within the studied region.
- New information on the evolution of the brain in the early ray-finned fishes, gained from the study of remains of the latest Carboniferous-earliest Permian ray-finned fishes from Brazil with extensive soft-tissue preservation of brains, cranial nerves, eyes and possible cardiovascular tissues, is presented by Figueroa et al. (2024).
- Redescription and study on the affinities of Westollia crassa is published by Štamberg (2024), who confirms the placement of this species as a distinct member of the family Aeduellidae.
- Bakaev (2024) designates a neotype of Eurysomus soloduchi, and interprets Eurysomus as a generalist feeder able to feed on hard prey.
- A study on teeth of members of Eurynotoidiformes is published by Bakaev et al. (2024), who interpret eurynotoidiforms as likely the oldest known actinopterygians specialized for herbivory.
- Revision of the fossil material of ray-finned fishes from the Permian-Triassic transition from the Kuznetsk Basin (Siberia, Russia) is published by Bakaev (2024).
- Kumar et al. (2024) describe fossil material of a member of the genus Cylindracanthus from the Eocene Naredi Formation (India), extending known geographical distribution of members of the genus.
- Fang et al. (2024) report the discovery of teeth with cutting edges of large carnivorous fishes from the Norian Qulonggongba Formation (Tibet, China), interpreted as likely belonging to a member of the genus Birgeria.
- Cooper (2024) describes fossil material of an acipenseriform from the Kimmeridge Clay (United Kingdom), representing the first record of a Late Jurassic member of this group found outside Asia.
- Cavin et al. (2024) describe fossil material of a large-bodied ray-finned fish from a Lower Triassic outcrop in northern Dobrogea (Romania), with anatomy interpreted as indicative of affinities with Polzbergiidae, and interpret the studied fossils as belonging to the earliest known large, specialized, durophagous neopterygian.
- Review of the fossil record of non-marine members of Pycnodontiformes is published by Cawley & Kriwet (2024), who report that the incursions of pycnodontiforms into brackish and freshwater habitats increased during the Cretaceous period, when the rising sea levels might have made it easier for marine fishes to colonize continental environments.
- Revision of evidence of growth and aging in the fossil material of pycnodonts is published by Capasso (2024), who find no evidence for a single overall pattern of somatic growth, but reports evidence of specific changes which seem to be common in the studied pycnodonts.
- Capasso, Ebert & Witzmann (2024) review dental pathologies in pycnodonts, report uneven distribution of tooth anomalies in the pycnodont fossil record and interpret such distribution as suggesting that pycnodont teeth weren't initially ordered into distinct dental rows, which only appeared in the most derived forms.
- Review of pathologies in the skeletons and dermal scales of pycnodont specimens is published by Capasso, Ebert & Witzmann (2024).
- Capasso & Witzmann (2024) describe non-dental odontodes in two specimens of Haquelpycnodus picteti from the Cenomanian of Lebanon, representing the first record of dermal odontodes in pycnodonts reported to date, and interpret the anatomical position and structure of the studied structures as indicating that they functionally participated in the chewing process.
- New information on the anatomy of Tibetodus gyrodoides is provided by Fang & Wu (2024).
- Vullo & Frey (2024) describe specimens of Atractosteus messelensis and Cyclurus kehreri found with bat specimens in close contact with their jaws, and interpret this finding as evidence of opportunistic feeding on drowning or dead bats by Eocene amiids and gars from the Messel pit (Germany).
- Gouiric-Cavalli et al. (2024) describe new fossil material of Ameghinichthys antarcticus from the Tithonian strata of the Longing Member of the Ameghino/Nordenskjöld Formation (Antarctica), interpreted as supporting placement of Ameghinichthys in Dapediiformes.
- Fossil material of gars, representing one of the oldest record of members of this group from South America reported to date, is described from the Cretaceous (Albian-Cenomanian) Alcântara Formation (Brazil) by Brito et al. (2024).
- Nikolov et al. (2024) describe fossil material of gars from the Santonian–Campanian strata from the Vrabchov Dol locality (Bulgaria), expanding known geographical range of gars within the Late Cretaceous European Archipelago.
- Weis et al. (2024) study gut contents of pachycormid specimens from the Toarcian strata in Luxembourg, and report that the studied pachycormids fed on octobrachian cephalopods.
- Cooper (2024) describes fossil material of Pachycormus macropterus from the Toarcian strata in Normandy (France) representing the first direct evidence of cannibalism in a pachycormiform fish reported to date.
- Cooper, Maxwell & Martill (2024) describe fossil material of Asthenocormus cf. titanius from the Kimmeridge Clay, representing the first unambiguous record of Asthenocormus from the United Kingdom reported to date.
- Kanarkina, Zverkov & Polyakova (2024) identify fossil material of Protosphyraena ferox and P. tenuirostris from the Cenomanian Polpino Formation (Kursk Oblast, Russia), reinterpret Australopachycormus as a junior synonym of Protosphyraena, describe the first specimens of Protosphyraena from the Albian of the North Caucasus, and interpret the studied fossils as evidence of wide distribution of Protosphyraena already in the late Early Cretaceous.
- Redescription of Aphnelepis australis, based on data from a new specimen from the Talbragar fossil site (Australia), is published by Bean (2024), who assigns A. australis to the teleost family Archaeomaenidae.
- Bennett (2024) describes a series of caudal vertebrae of an ichthyodectiform from the Upper Cretaceous Niobrara Formation (Kansas, United States), preserved with pathologies unknown in extant and fossil fishes but sharing similarities with diffuse idiopathic skeletal hyperostosis and spondylosis deformans of mammals, and interprets the studied pathologies as caused by combined bacterial and fungal infections, affecting the swimming abilities of the studied fish and likely ultimately resulting in its death.
- Cantalice et al. (2024) describe fossil material of a previously unknown albuliform from the Campanian strata from the Múzquiz Lagerstätte (Austin Group; Coahuila, Mexico), estimated to be approximately 3,9 metres long and representing the largest albuliform reported to date.
- A study on the phylogenetic relationships and biogeography of extant and fossil osteoglossids is published by Capobianco & Friedman (2024), who interpret their findings as indicating that the last common ancestor of extant osteoglossids was marine, and that the group colonized freshwater settings at least four times.
- A study on the phylogenetic relationships of herring-like fossil fishes belonging to the group Clupei is published by Kevrekidis et al. (2024).
- Liu et al. (2024) revise Osteochilus sanshuiensis, Osteochilus longipinnatus and Osteochilus laticorpus from the Paleogene Buxin Formation (China), synonymizing them into a single species named Jianghanichthys sanshuiensis.
- Claeson et al. (2024) present a new reconstruction of Oncorhynchus rastrosus, interpreting its enlarged teeth as projecting laterally like tusks.
- Torres-Parada et al. (2024) report the discovery of fossil material of members of the genus Enchodus from the Upper Cretaceous strata of the La Luna Formation (Colombia).
- Redescription of Whitephippus tamensis is published by Davesne et al. (2024), who interpret this taxon as an early member of Lampriformes, likely related to extant opahs and oarfishes and providing the earliest known evidence of adaptation of lampriforms to the pelagic environment.
- Laine et al. (2024) sequence three-spined stickleback genomes from Late Pleistocene sediments from the Jossavannet lake (Finnmark, Norway), who identify more marine- than freshwater-associated ancestry in the studied genomes, but also find evidence that freshwater-associated alleles were already established at known loci of large effect during the brackish phase of the formation of the lake.
- Miyata et al. (2024) describe an assemblage of marine fish otoliths from the Lower Cretaceous Kimigahama Formation (Japan), including the oldest known fossil material of members of the family Ichthyotringidae, as well as of otoliths of pterothrissine bonefishes, elopiforms and herring smelts indicative of cosmopolitan distribution of these groups during the Early Cretaceous.
- Evidence from the skeletal and otolith fossil record, interpreted as indicative of presence of rich and diverse teleost assemblages in known Maastrichtian marine settings which were significantly affected by the Cretaceous–Paleogene extinction event, is presented by Schwarzhans, Carnevale & Stringer (2024), who also find that perciforms and related groups, ophidiiforms and gadiforms underwent an explosive radiation and diversification in the early Paleogene.
- A study on the survivorship patterns of freshwater ray-finned fishes during the Cretaceous-Paleogene transition, based on data from the fossil record from the Denver Basin, is published by Wilson et al. (2024), who report evidence of previously unrecognized diversification of freshwater clades after the Cretaceous–Paleogene extinction event, as well as evidence of localized drops in diversity.

== Lobe-finned fishes ==
Name	Novelty	Status	Authors	Age	Type locality	Location	Notes	Images
Ferganoceratodus edwardsi	Sp. nov		Challands et al.	Late Triassic (Norian)	Pebbly Arkose Formation	Zimbabwe	A lungfish belonging to the group Ceratodontoidei.	
Graulia	Gen. et sp. nov	Valid	Manuelli et al.	Middle Triassic	Calcaire à Cératites Formation	France	A coelacanth belonging to the family Mawsoniidae. The type species is G. branchiodonta.	
Harajicadectes	Gen. et sp. nov	Valid	Choo et al.	Devonian (Givetian–Frasnian)	Parke Siltstone	Australia	A basal member of Tetrapodomorpha. The type species is H. zhumini.	
Jemalongia	Gen. et sp. nov		Young	Devonian	Cloghnan Shale	Australia	A probable member of Porolepiformes. The type species is J. ritchiei.	
Ngamugawi	Gen. et sp. nov	Valid	Clement et al.	Devonian (Frasnian)	Gogo Formation	Australia	A coelacanth. The type species is N. wirngarri.	

=== Lobe-finned fish research ===
- New fossil material of sarcopterygians, including the first fossils of Diabolepis and Styloichthys found outside Qujing (Xitun Formation; Yunnan, China), is described from the Lochkovian Lianhuashan and Nahkaoling formations (Guangxi, China) by Li et al. (2024).
- Toriño et al. (2024) reconstruct the skull of a specimen of Mawsonia from the Upper Jurassic strata in Uruguay.
- Cupello et al. (2024) describe pulmonary vessels in a calcified lung of a specimen of Macropoma mantelli from the Upper Cretaceous Chalk Formation (United Kingdom) and in extant coelacanth, confirming the air-breathing function of the tubular structure in the fossil coelacanth specimens called the calcified organ, and interpret coelacanths as having pulmonary arteries homologous to the same paired branches of the air-filled organs (including gas bladders) of other bony fishes.
- Redescription of the tooth plates of Atlantoceratodus iheringi, based on data from new and previously described fossil material, is published by Panzeri (2024).
- New information on the anatomy of Chaoceratodus portezuelensis, based on the study of the fossil material from the Portezuelo and Cerro Lisandro formations (Argentina), is provided by Panzeri & Guzmán (2024).
- Stewart et al. (2024) describe the anatomy of the axial skeleton of Tiktaalik roseae, providing evidence of the appearance of the evolution of increased mobility at the head-trunk boundary prior to the origin of limbs, as well as evidence of the presence of derived features of the anatomy of the ribs that were previously known only from limbed taxa, and interpret the anatomy of T. roseae as indicative of a locomotor capacity intermediate between those of other elpistostegalians and those of limbed vertebrates.

== Other fishes ==
Name	Novelty	Status	Authors	Age	Type locality	Location	Notes	Images
Palaeospondylus australis	Sp. nov		Burrow, Young & Lu	Devonian (Emsian)		Australia	A jawed vertebrate of uncertain affinities.	

== General research ==
- A diverse assemblage of fish remains, including the youngest fossil material of Bransonella lingulata reported to date, is described from the Carboniferous (Gzhelian) Finis Shale (Texas, United States) by Ivanov & Seuss (2024).
- Rinehart & Lucas (2024) describe a trace of a fish walking on a muddy substrate from the Permian Robledo Mountains Formation (New Mexico, United States), interpret it as unlikely to be produced by a lobe-finned fish, and name a new ichnotaxon Ambulopisces voigti.
- A study on the composition of the microfossil assemblage from the Carnian San Cassiano Formation (Italy), providing evidence of the presence of durophagous sharks, stem-neopterygians, holosteans and (less common) putative basal teleosts, is published by Pindakiewicz et al. (2024).
- Blake et al. (2024) describe assemblages of vertebrate remains (dominated by sharks, bony fishes and crocodyliforms) from two localities from the London–Brabant Massif (Lower Greensand; United Kingdom), including the youngest occurrences of Vectiselachos gosslingi and V. ornatus reported to date, as well as including remains of at least five cartilaginous fish taxa interpreted as likely reworked from the underlying Jurassic or Wealden strata.
- Boles et al. (2024) describe a new assemblage of vertebrate microfossils from the Cretaceous-Paleogene transition from the Hornerstown Formation (New Jersey, United States), including the first Cretaceous (Maastrichtian) records of Palaeogaleus vincenti and Paralbula marylandica and the first Paleocene record of Saurocephalus lanciformis, extending known geographic range of Saurocephalus, Phyllodus paulkatoi and Notidanodon brotzeni, and providing evidence of slow recovery of elasmobranchs and ray-finned fish after the Cretaceous–Paleogene extinction event.
- Goedert et al. (2024) describe a new assemblage of fish fossils from the Eocene (Ypresian) Crescent Formation (Washington, United States), including the first early Eocene shark assemblage reported from western North America.
- Ebersole et al. (2024) describe a new assemblage of fish fossils from the Oligocene Rupelian Red Bluff Clay (Alabama, United States), including the first record of a member of the genus Eostegostoma from the Oligocene and from the Gulf Coastal Plain of North America, as well as fossils of Macrorhizodus praecursor, Xiphiorhynchus kimblalocki, Cylindracanthus rectus and C. ornatus providing evidence of persistence of these species into at least the early Oligocene.
