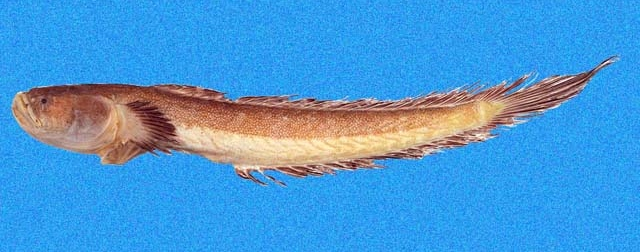

Conservation status
- Endangered (IUCN 3.1)

Scientific classification
- Kingdom: Animalia
- Phylum: Chordata
- Class: Actinopterygii
- Division: Teleostei
- Order: Gobiiformes
- Family: Gobiidae
- Genus: Akko
- Species: A. rossi

Binomial name
- Akko rossi Van Tassell & C. C. Baldwin, 2004
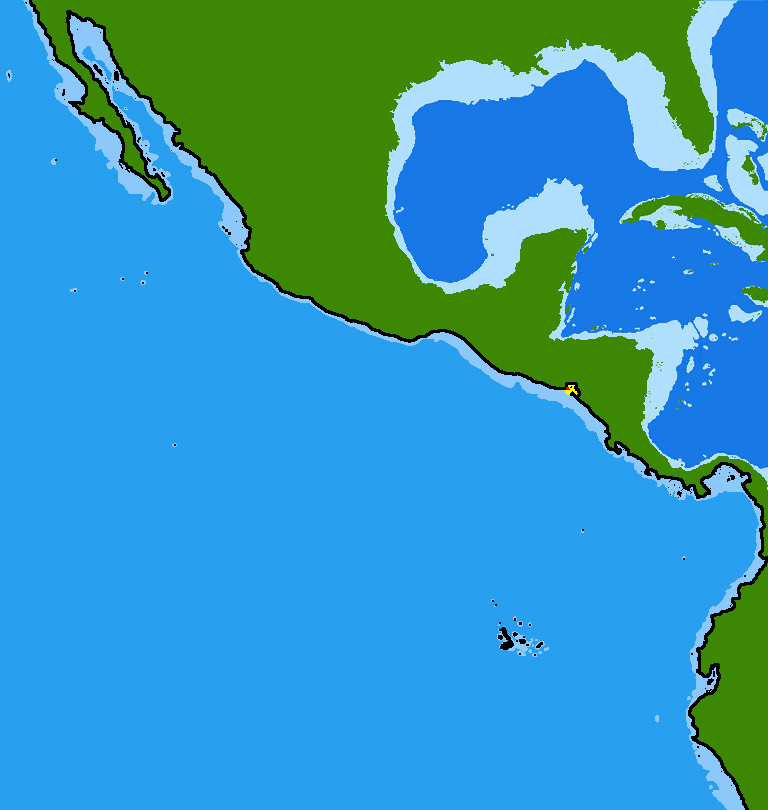

= Akko rossi =

Species of fish

Akko rossi, the blackfin specter goby, is a species of goby from the family Gobiidae. It is mostly known from one specimen from El Salvador. It lives in burrows in black mud.
