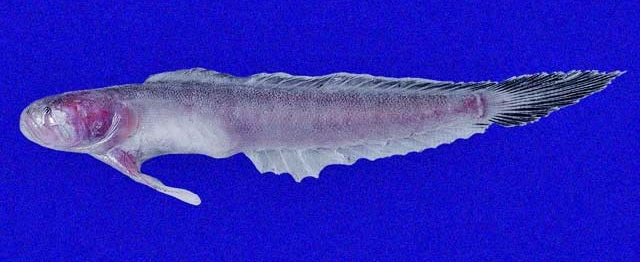

Conservation status
- Least Concern (IUCN 3.1)

Scientific classification
- Kingdom: Animalia
- Phylum: Chordata
- Class: Actinopterygii
- Division: Teleostei
- Order: Gobiiformes
- Family: Gobiidae
- Genus: Akko
- Species: A. brevis

Binomial name
- Akko brevis (Günther, 1864)
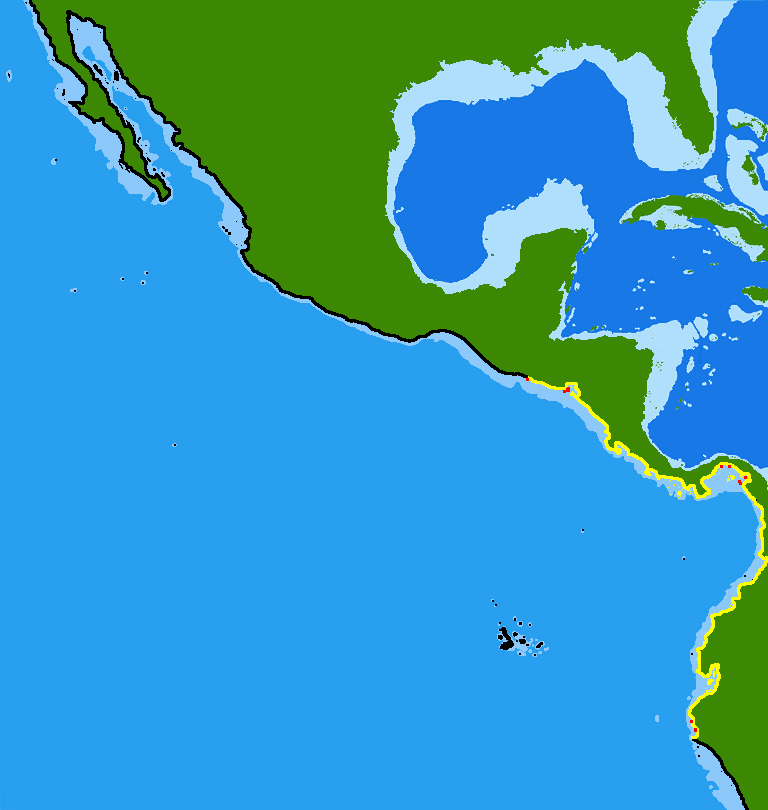

Synonyms
- Amblyopus brevis Günther, 1864; Gobioides brevis (Günther, 1864)

= Akko brevis =

Species of fish

Akko brevis, the dark-tail specter-goby, is a species of gobies native to the eastern central Pacific from El Salvador to Panama. It is found in black muddy bottoms of estuaries and mangroves.

== Short description ==
Distinguished by the following characteristics: very small eyes; light pink body color with darker red areas composed of blood capillaries close to surface; elongate body; first dorsal with VII spines; upper and lower jaws with enlarged, widely spaced teeth that overlap the lips of both jaws; greatly reduced head pores, occasionally absent.
