= Promethean goby =

Scientific classification
- Domain: Eukaryota
- Kingdom: Animalia
- Phylum: Chordata
- Class: Actinopterygii
- Order: Gobiiformes
- Family: Gobiidae
- Genus: Varicus
- Species: V. prometheus

Binomial name
- Varicus prometheus Fuentes, Baldwin, Robertson, Lardizábal & Tornabene 2023

Species of reef goby

The promethean goby (Varicus prometheus) is a mesophotic species of reef goby native to the Caribbean Sea, more specifically Half Moon Bay, Roatan, which is its type locality. The first specimen of the species was a female collected among a small group of algae of the genus Halimeda.
