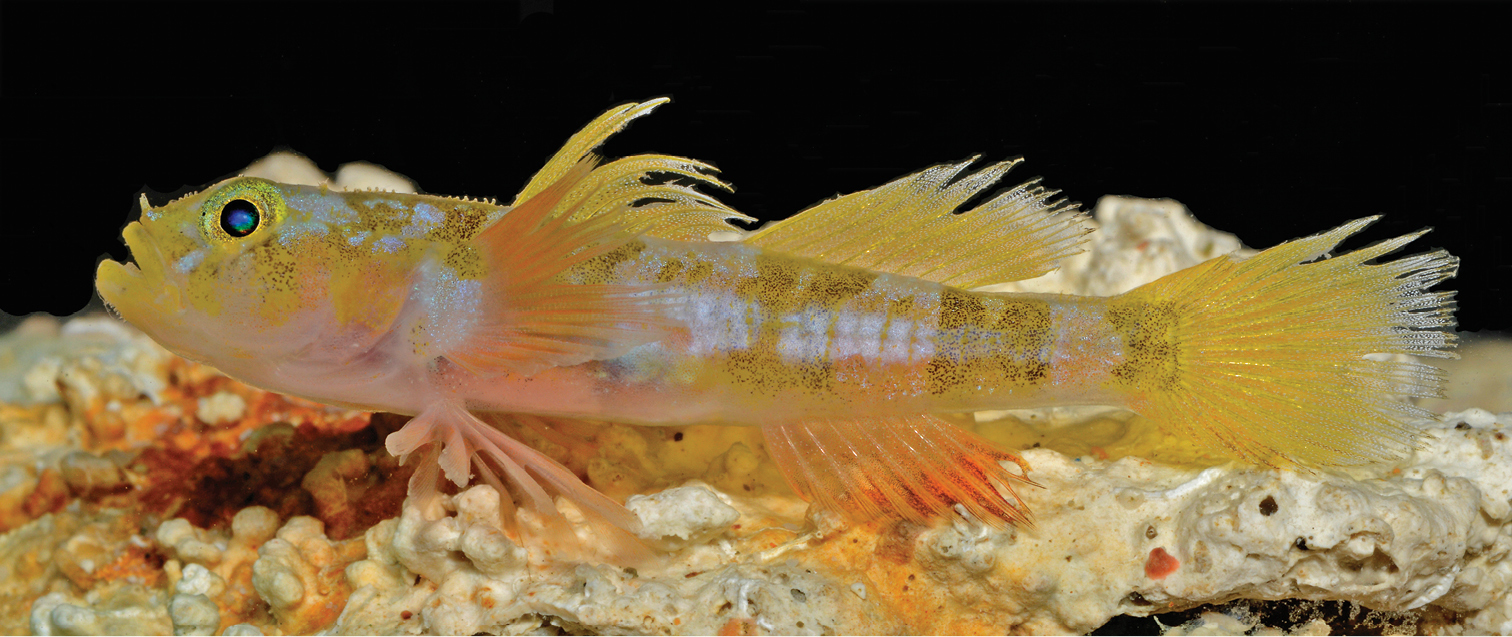
- Varicus lacerta

Scientific classification
- Kingdom: Animalia
- Phylum: Chordata
- Class: Actinopterygii
- Order: Gobiiformes
- Family: Gobiidae
- Subfamily: Gobiinae
- Genus: Varicus; C. R. Robins & J. E. Böhlke, 1961

Type species
- Varicus bucca C. R. Robins & J. E. Böhlke, 1961

= Varicus =

Genus of fishes

Varicus is a genus of fish in the family Gobiidae, the gobies. They are native to the western Atlantic Ocean.

The genus was recently reexamined, and several new species were described and added to the group in 2016.

Species include:

- Varicus adamsi Gilmore, Van Tassell & Tornabene 2016 (twilight goby)
- Varicus benthonis (Ginsburg, 1953)
- Varicus bucca C. R. Robins & J. E. Böhlke, 1961
- Varicus cephalocellatus Gilmore, Van Tassell & Baldwin, 2016 (ocellated splitfin goby)
- Varicus decorum Van Tassell, Baldwin & Tornabene, 2016 (decorated splitfin goby)
- Varicus lacerta Tornabene, Robertson & Baldwin, 2016 (Godzilla goby)
- Varicus marilynae Gilmore, 1979 (Orangebelly goby)
- Varicus nigritus Gilmore, Van Tassell & Baldwin, 2016 (banded splitfin goby)
- Varicus prometheus Fuentes, Baldwin, Robertson, Lardizábal & Tornabene, 2023 (Promethean goby)
- Varicus roatanensis Fuentes, Baldwin, Robertson, Lardizábal & Tornabene, 2023 (Roatan goby)
- Varicus veliguttatus Van Tassell, Baldwin & Gilmore, 2016 (spotted-sail goby)
- Varicus vespa (Hastings & Bortone, 1981)

The whiteband goby (Paedovaricus imswe) was formerly known as Varicus imswe. This genus is closely related to genus Chriolepis, and now contains some species formerly included there.
