= Arthrobatis =

Arthrobatis Temporal range: Rhaetian-Toarcian

Scientific classification
- Kingdom: Animalia
- Phylum: Chordata
- Class: ?Chondrichthyes
- Superorder: ?Batoidea
- Family: †Arthrobatidae Greenfield, 2024
- Genus: †Arthrobatis Whitley, 1940

Type species
- †Arthrobatis rileyi (Agassiz, 1843)

Synonyms
- Family synonymy: Arthropteridae Jordan, 1905 (invalid name); Genus synonymy: Arthropterus Agassiz, 1843 (preoccupied by Arthropterus Macleay, 1838); Species synonymy: Arthropterus rileyi Agassiz, 1843; Platyrhina rileyi (Agassiz, 1843)

Extinct genus of rays

Arthrobatis is an extinct genus of possible rays that lived during the Late Triassic-Early Jurassic in the United Kingdom. It contains one species, A. rileyi, and is the only member of the family Arthrobatidae. It might be the oldest known batoid, but its exact age and affinities are uncertain.

== Taxonomy ==
Arthropterus rileyi was named by Louis Agassiz in 1843 for pectoral fins from the Lias Group of England. The type material is lost; it was housed in the Bristol Museum and may have been destroyed in 1940 by the Bristol Blitz. The original genus name was preoccupied by the beetle Arthropterus. In 1940, Gilbert P. Whitley proposed Arthrobatis as a replacement.

David S. Jordan named the family Arthropteridae in 1905. It was invalidated because its type genus was preoccupied and in 2024 it was replaced by Arthrobatidae.

== Classification ==
Arthrobatis was initially identified as a shark by Agassiz. In 1848, it was first classified as a ray by Christoph Giebel and was synonymized with Platyrhina. Pieter Bleeker retained it as a distinct genus and assigned it to Rhinobatidae in 1859. It was referred to Rajidae in 1880 by Albert Günther, which was followed by Whitley. In 1987, Henri Cappetta speculated that it could actually be a misidentified bony fish. Arthrobatis is currently considered to be a tentative batoid, but what taxa it is most closely related to is unknown. It is potentially as old as the Rhaetian, pre-dating the Pliensbachian Antiquaobatis, which would make it the earliest ray.
