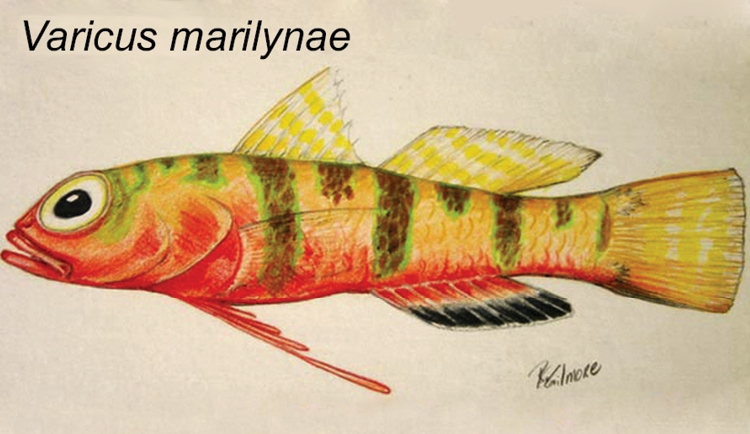

Conservation status
- Data Deficient (IUCN 3.1)

Scientific classification
- Kingdom: Animalia
- Phylum: Chordata
- Class: Actinopterygii
- Division: Teleostei
- Order: Gobiiformes
- Family: Gobiidae
- Genus: Varicus
- Species: V. marilynae

Binomial name
- Varicus marilynae (Gilmore, 1979)

= Orangebelly goby =

Species of fish

The orangebelly goby (Varicus marilynae) is a species of fish described by Gilmore in 1979. It is known only from a pair of specimens collected from the eastern and western sides of the Florida Peninsula.

== Description ==
The orangebelly goby is short in length with an indented forehead, and as suggested by the name is primarily orange in colour. The dorsal fins are covered by yellow stripes, whilst the body ranging from the head to the base are covered in khaki stripes, some of which are comparatively longer in length. The species can be distinguished from close relatives by unbranched pelvic rays, the presence of elongated tips on four of the pelvic rays, a fifth vestigial pelvic ray, a bilobed tongue and scales beneath the leading dorsal fin.

== Distribution and habitat ==
The two existing specimens originated from the Florida Middle Grounds in the Gulf of Mexico, and off the coast of Vero Beach. They tend to inhabit the demersal zone between the depths of 60 to 91 m (200 to 300 ft), and are often found on shell-hash bottoms with scattered rocks and sand in the vicinity of extant reef systems. These outlined locations are generalisations, as greater population enclaves must be recorded to establish a more specific range.

== Behaviour ==
In association with other similar species of goby, it is probable that the fish is a planktivore. It would appear that there is no record of the species in the commercial trade market, as the pair caught in the late twentieth century remain the only documentation of the species to date.

== Population ==
The population of the species remains unknown, as it has only been recorded on two occasions. The nominal records indicate that the specimens were a male and a female, and due to their frequentation of deep subtropical waters, a greater concentration of the populace may be undiscovered at present.

== Threats ==
The species does not appear to be affected by the shrimp fishery industry, or the commercial pet trade. The only threat that may pose an issue to the orangebelly goby is the potential for predation from the invasive lionfish. The diminutive size of the fish is the primary threat, as juveniles and adults are both relatively small enough to form a portion of the diet of the lionfish. The coinciding habitation of the exposed demarsal zone exacerbates the potential for this risk.
