= Akko dionaea =

Conservation status
- Data Deficient (IUCN 3.1)

Scientific classification
- Kingdom: Animalia
- Phylum: Chordata
- Class: Actinopterygii
- Order: Gobiiformes
- Family: Gobiidae
- Genus: Akko
- Species: A. dionaea

Binomial name
- Akko dionaea Birdsong & C. R. Robins, 1995
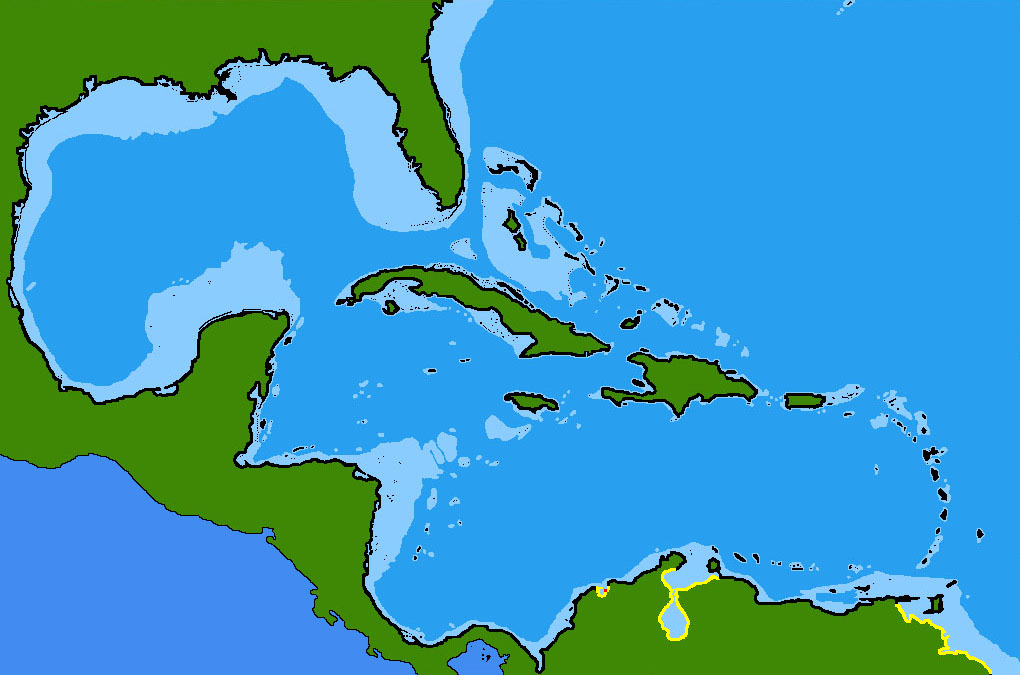

Species of fish

Akko dionaea, the Atlantic specter goby, is a species of gobies native to the Amazon basin and Colombia. It inhabits black mud at ca. 20 m depth.
