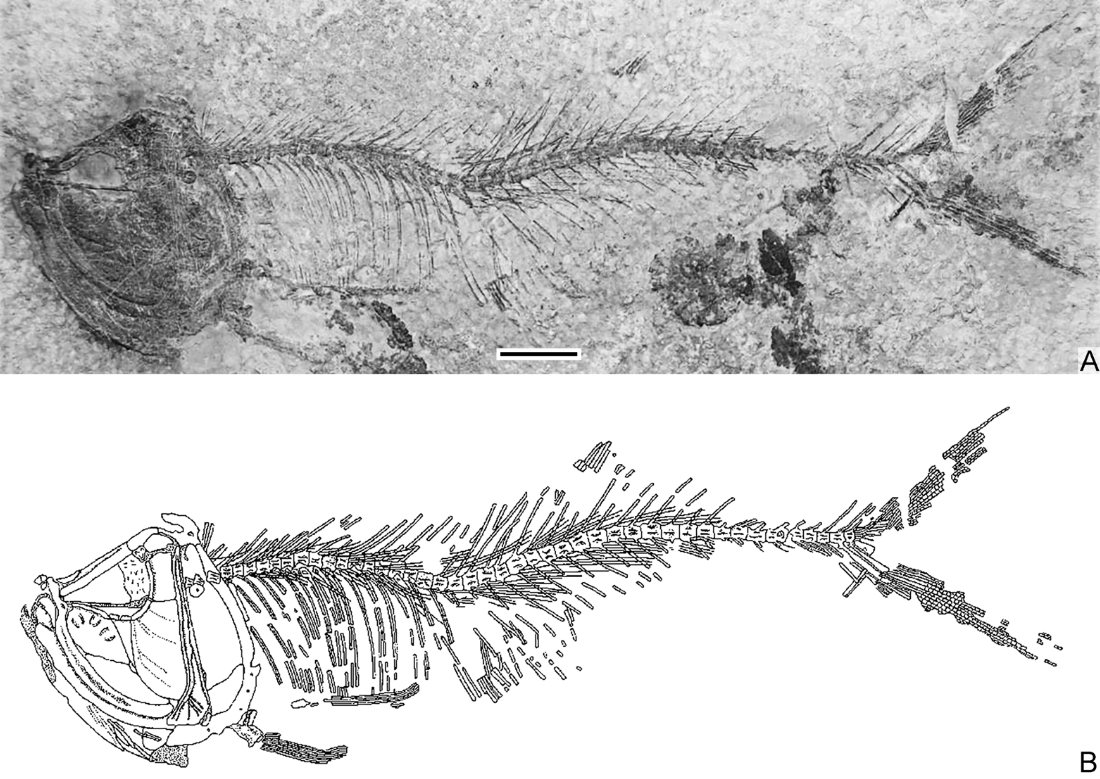
- Photograph and line drawing of holotype UAHMP 1063. Scale Bar = 1cm

Scientific classification
- Kingdom: Animalia
- Phylum: Chordata
- Class: Actinopterygii
- Family: †Xeneichthyidae
- Genus: †Xeneichthys; Arratia & González-Rodríguez, 2024
- Species: †X. yanesi

Binomial name
- †Xeneichthys yanesi Arratia & González-Rodríguez, 2024

= Xeneichthys =

Xeneichthys Temporal range: Early Cretaceous, Albian

Extinct genus of ray-finned fish

Xeneichthys is an extinct genus of teleost fish from the Albian El Doctor Formation in Hidalgo, Mexico. The type and only species, X. yanesi, is known from multiple specimens, representing the entire body.

== Description ==
Xeneichthys is known from several specimens from a locality called the Muhi Quarry. The holotype, UAHMP 1063, represents a complete specimen. The average length of the species is 17 cm (6.7 in), however some sampled individuals reached up to 20 cm (7.9 in).

== Etymology ==
The generic name, Xeneichthys. 'Xene' comes from the Otomí word meaning 'big mouth', while 'ichthys', originates from the Ancient Greek word meaning 'fish'. The specific epithet, yanesi, honors the Yáñez family, who worked at the quarry the specimens were found in.
