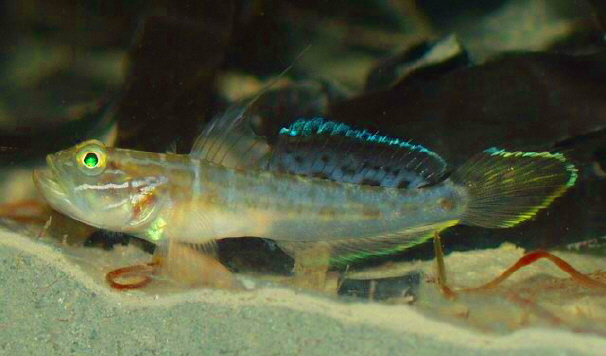
- Clown goby Microgobius gulosus

Scientific classification
- Domain: Eukaryota
- Kingdom: Animalia
- Phylum: Chordata
- Class: Actinopterygii
- Order: Gobiiformes
- Family: Gobiidae
- Genus: Microgobius; Poey, 1876

Type species
- Microgobius signatus Poey, 1876

Synonyms
- Xenogobius Metzelaar, 1919; Zalypnus D. S. Jordan & Evermann, 1896

= Microgobius =

Genus of fishes

Microgobius is a genus of gobies native to the Pacific and Atlantic coasts of the Americas.

== Species ==
There are currently 15 recognized species in this genus:

- Microgobius brevispinis Ginsburg, 1939 (Balboa goby)
- Microgobius carri Fowler, 1945 (Seminole goby)
- Microgobius crocatus Birdsong, 1968
- Microgobius curtus Ginsburg, 1939
- Microgobius cyclolepis C. H. Gilbert, 1890 (Roundscale goby)
- Microgobius emblematicus (D. S. Jordan & C. H. Gilbert, 1882) (Emblem goby)
- Microgobius erectus Ginsburg, 1938 (Erect goby)
- Microgobius gulosus (Girard, 1858) (Clown goby)
- Microgobius meeki Evermann & M. C. Marsh, 1899
- Microgobius microlepis Longley & Hildebrand, 1940 (Banner goby)
- Microgobius miraflorensis C. H. Gilbert & Starks, 1904 (Miraflores goby)
- Microgobius signatus Poey, 1876
- Microgobius tabogensis Meek & Hildebrand, 1928 (Taboga goby)
- Microgobius thalassinus (D. S. Jordan & C. H. Gilbert, 1883) (Green goby)
- Microgobius urraca Tornabene, Van Tassell & D. R. Robertson, 2012 (Dark-finned sand goby)
