= Gobulus =

Scientific classification
- Kingdom: Animalia
- Phylum: Chordata
- Class: Actinopterygii
- Order: Gobiiformes
- Family: Gobiidae
- Genus: Gobulus; Ginsburg, 1933

Type species
- Gobiosoma crescentalis C. H. Gilbert, 1892

Genus of fishes

Gobulus is a genus of gobies native to the Atlantic and Pacific coasts of the Americas.

== Species ==
There are currently four recognized species in this genus:

- Gobulus birdsongi Hoese & Reader, 2001
- Gobulus crescentalis (C. H. Gilbert, 1892) (Crescent goby)
- Gobulus hancocki Ginsburg, 1938 (Sandtop goby)
- Gobulus myersi Ginsburg, 1939 (Paleback goby)
