= Parrella =

Scientific classification
- Kingdom: Animalia
- Phylum: Chordata
- Class: Actinopterygii
- Order: Gobiiformes
- Family: Gobiidae
- Genus: Parrella; Ginsburg, 1938

Type species
- Parrella maxillaris Ginsburg, 1938

Genus of fishes

Parrella is a genus of gobies native to the tropical waters of the Pacific and Atlantic coasts of the Americas. The name of this genus honours the Norwegian American marine biologist, zoologist and oceanographer Albert Eide Parr (1900-1991).

== Species ==
There are currently five recognized species in this genus:

- Parrella fusca Ginsburg, 1939
- Parrella ginsburgi Wade, 1946 (Darkblotch goby)
- Parrella lucretiae (C. H. Eigenmann & R. S. Eigenmann, 1888) (Lucretia's goby)
- Parrella macropteryx Ginsburg, 1939
- Parrella maxillaris Ginsburg, 1938 (Doublestripe goby)
