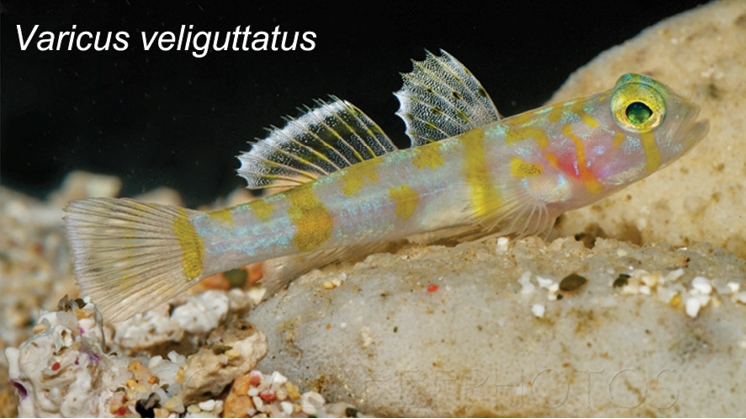

Scientific classification
- Domain: Eukaryota
- Kingdom: Animalia
- Phylum: Chordata
- Class: Actinopterygii
- Order: Gobiiformes
- Family: Gobiidae
- Genus: Varicus
- Species: V. veliguttatus

Binomial name
- Varicus veliguttatus Van Tassell, Baldwin & Gilmore, 2016

= Varicus veliguttatus =

Species of fish

Varicus veliguttatus, also known as the spotted-sail goby, is a species of fish in the genus Varicus.

== Description ==
The spotted-sail goby has a short and robust body and has a head that has 3 to 4 narrow yellow wide-interspaced cross-bars. The head and body are translucent white in color. It has a known max length of 5.5 cm (2.2 in).

== Distribution ==
The species is known to be endemic to San Salvador, Bahamas, Curaçao and Tobago.

== Etymology ==
The genus name, Varicus, comes from the Latin varix which means dilated vein. The species name comes from the Latin words 'veli-' (sail) and '-guttatus' (speckled or spotted), which is in reference to the species' first dorsal fin which has scattered black markings.
