= Slow goby =

Conservation status
- Least Concern (IUCN 3.1)

Scientific classification
- Kingdom: Animalia
- Phylum: Chordata
- Class: Actinopterygii
- Order: Gobiiformes
- Family: Gobiidae
- Genus: Aruma; Ginsburg, 1933
- Species: A. histrio

Binomial name
- Aruma histrio (D. S. Jordan, 1884)

Synonyms
- Gobiosoma histrio D. S. Jordan, 1884

Species of fish

The Slow goby (Aruma histrio) is a species of gobies, endemic to the Gulf of California on the west coast of North America. It inhabits crevices in rocks and can be found in tide pools down to a depth of around 14 metres (46 ft). This species grows to a maximum length of 6.5 centimetres (2.6 in) SL. This species is the only known member of its genus.

== Description ==
It is brown with 6-7 white bars along its side, with some bars weak or missing. There is a narrow white bar at the base of its pectoral fin, followed by a dark brown bar. It is elongated and somewhat compressed. Its large head is flattened with swollen cheeks and a large mouth. It has a pore between its eyes, and two small pores on its preopercle. Its tail fin is long and rounded without scales or a lateral line.

== Habitat ==
The slow goby inhabits rocky crevices in tide pools and under cobble in shallow water. The larvae are usually found around sargassum. It needs a temperature of 20.8–23.8 °C (69.4–74.8 °F). Adults are benthic.
