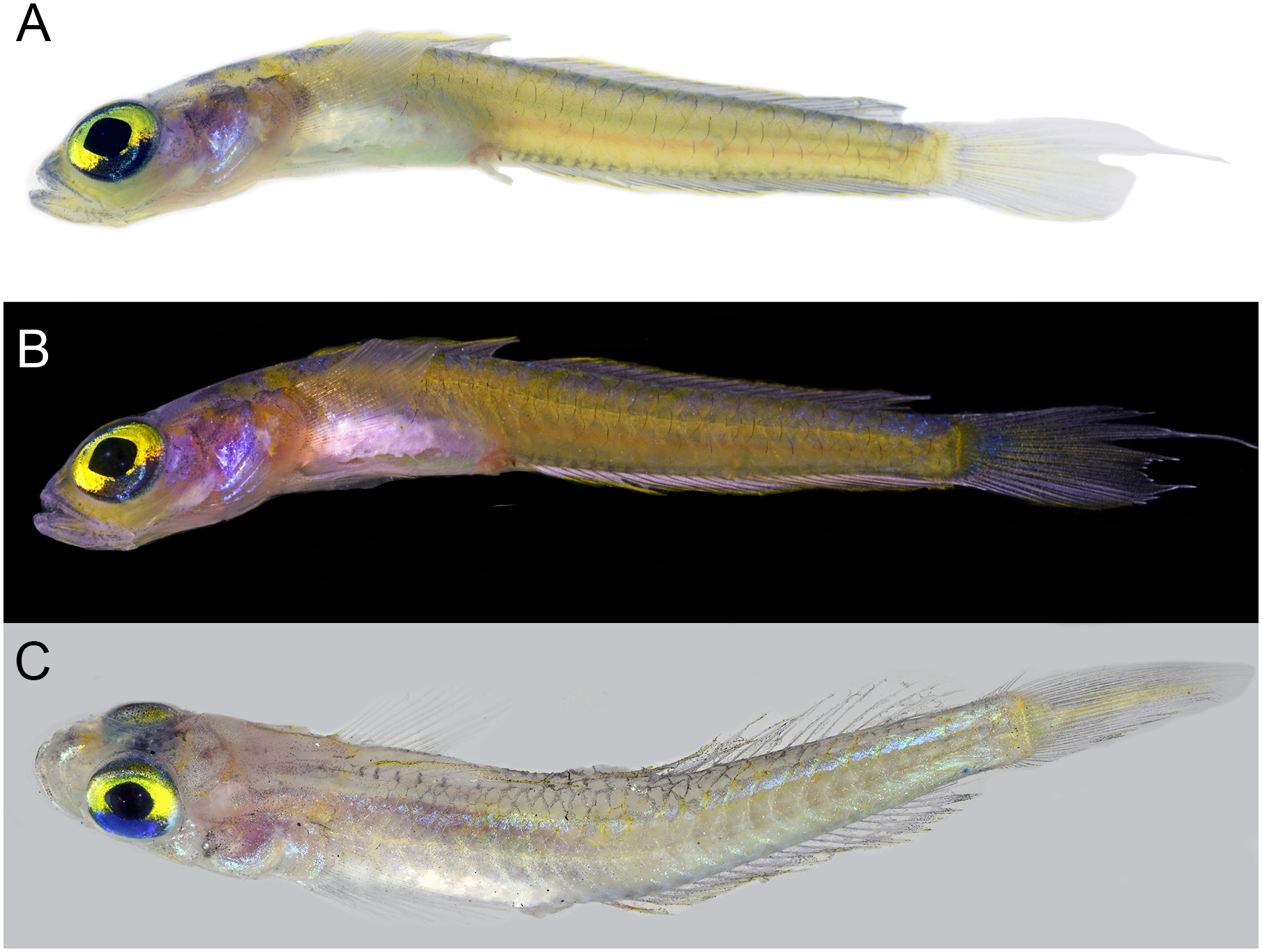

Scientific classification
- Kingdom: Animalia
- Phylum: Chordata
- Class: Actinopterygii
- Order: Gobiiformes
- Family: Gobiidae
- Genus: Palatogobius
- Species: P. grandoculus

Binomial name
- Palatogobius grandoculus Greenfield, 2002

= Palatogobius grandoculus =

Species of fish

Palatogobius grandoculus is a species of marine fish in the family Gobiidae and the order Gobiiformes. Its name comes from the Latin word palatum (palate) which pertains to palate and its teeth which form there, plus the Latin word gobius, which means goby. The species name grandoculus (from the Latin words grand and oculus) refers to this species' very large eyes. Specimens of P. grandoculus were collected as early as 1976, and originally described as the Mauve Goby, however it was not formally identified as a separate species and described until 2002.

== Description ==
Members of this species reach 3.2 cm (1.3 in) total length, and have 27 vertebra. Their dorsal fins contain only 8 spines but 17–18 soft rays. Similarly, their anal fins have only one spine, but 18–19 soft rays.

Overall, this species is very similar in appearance to its relative, the Mauve goby (Palatogobius paradoxus), however P. grandoculus has a much larger eye and shorter snout than P. paradoxus, as well as a much narrower band of skull between the orbits. Its body scales also extend forward on the sides, past the origin of the first dorsal fin, while other members of its genus have scales which only extend to beneath the second dorsal fin.

== Distribution and habitat ==
P. grandoculus is found in marine waters and lives at depths between 253 and 276 meters (830 and 906 ft). It can be encountered in the western Caribbean Sea, especially near Mexico and was originally collected near Cancún. It lives near the sea bed and can be found above coral fragments or sandy bottoms.
