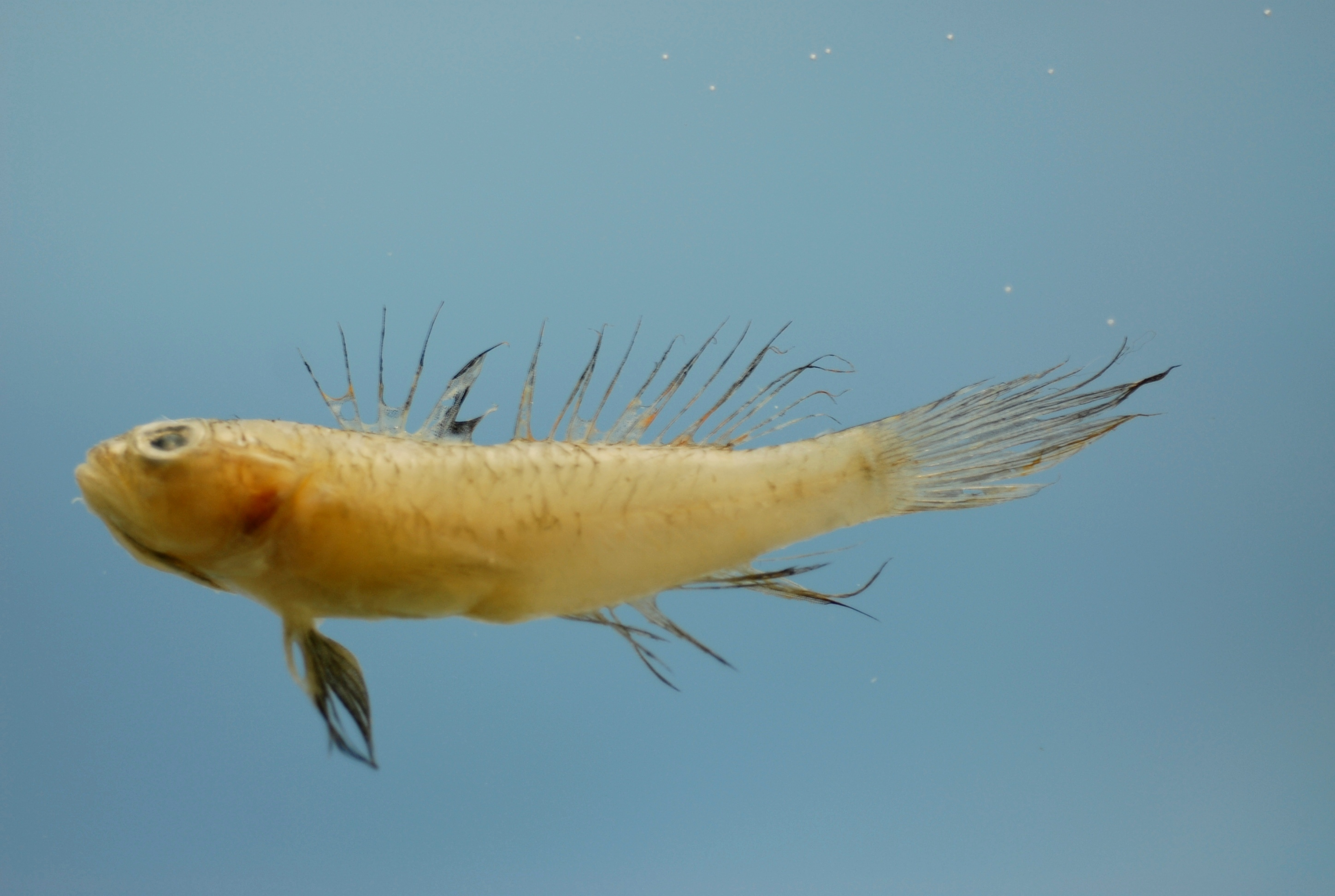
- Ragged goby (Bollmania communis)

Scientific classification
- Kingdom: Animalia
- Phylum: Chordata
- Class: Actinopterygii
- Division: Teleostei
- Order: Gobiiformes
- Family: Gobiidae
- Subfamily: Gobiinae
- Genus: Bollmannia; D. S. Jordan, 1890

Type species
- Bollmannia chlamydes D. S. Jordan, 1890

= Bollmannia =

Bollmannia Temporal range: Tortonian–present

Genus of fishes

Bollmannia is a genus of gobies native to the Atlantic and Pacific coasts of the Americas. The generic name honours the American naturalist Charles Harvey Bollman (1868–1889).

== Species ==
There are currently 11 recognized species in this genus:

- Bollmannia boqueronensis Evermann & M. C. Marsh, 1899 (White-eye goby)
- Bollmannia chlamydes D. S. Jordan, 1890
- Bollmannia communis Ginsburg, 1942 (Ragged goby)
- Bollmannia eigenmannorum (Garman, 1896) (Shelf goby)
- Bollmannia gomezi Acero P., 1981 (Colombian goby)
- Bollmannia litura Ginsburg, 1935
- Bollmannia macropoma C. H. Gilbert, 1892 (Frailscale goby)
- Bollmannia marginalis Ginsburg, 1939 (Apostrophe goby)
- Bollmannia ocellata C. H. Gilbert, 1892 (Pennant goby)
- Bollmannia stigmatura C. H. Gilbert, 1892 (Tailspot goby)
- Bollmannia umbrosa Ginsburg, 1939 (Dusky goby)

One fossil taxon is also known from otolith remains:

- †Bollmannia gatunensis (Schubert, 1908) [otolith] - Late Miocene (Tortonian to Messinian) of Panama, Ecuador, and Trinidad, potentially Middle Miocene of Veracruz, Mexico
