= Plesiolithus =

Plesiolithus Temporal range: Lutetian

Scientific classification
- Kingdom: Animalia
- Phylum: Chordata
- Class: Actinopterygii
- Division: Teleostei
- Genus: †Plesiolithus
- Species: †P. inornatus

Binomial name
- †Plesiolithus inornatus Schwarzhans et al., 2024

Extinct genus of fishes

Plesiolithus is an extinct genus of teleost that lived in what is now California during the Lutetian stage. It is a monotypic genus that contains the species P. inornatus.
