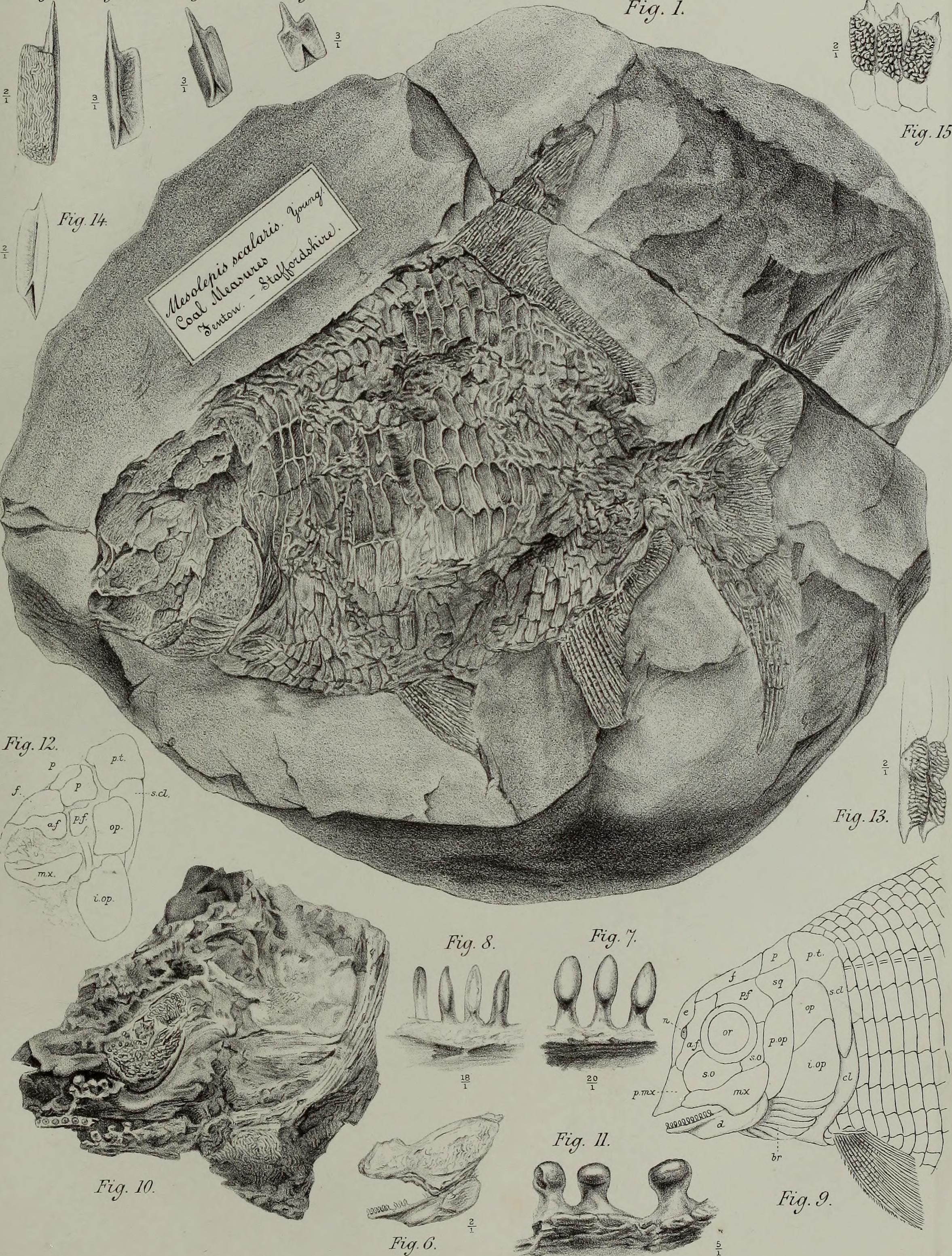
- Mesolepis scalaris
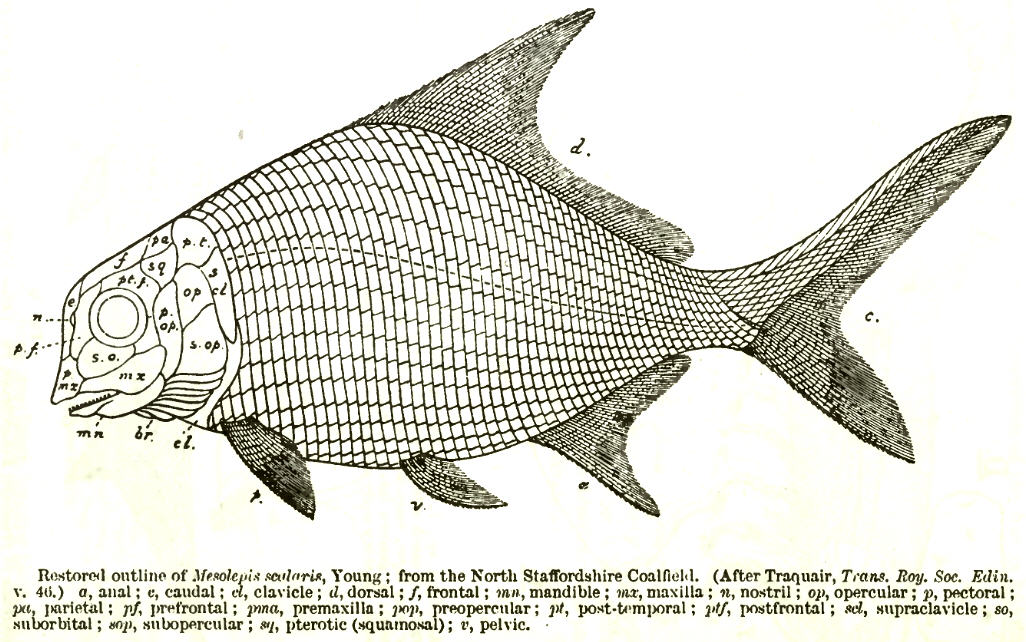

Scientific classification
- Domain: Eukaryota
- Kingdom: Animalia
- Phylum: Chordata
- Class: Actinopterygii
- Order: †Palaeonisciformes
- Genus: †Mesolepis; Young, 1866

Species
- Mesolepis arabellae; Mesolepis microptera; Mesolepis pustulosa; Mesolepis scalaris; Mesolepis wardi

= Mesolepis =

Mesolepis Temporal range: Tournaisian

Extinct genus of ray-finned fishes

Mesolepis is an extinct genus of ray-finned fish that lived during the Tournaisian stage of the Mississippian epoch.
