= El Doctor Formation =

Geologic formation in Mexico

- Stratigraphic range: Albian-Cenomanian; ~112–95 Ma
- Type: Formation
- Sub-units: La Negra Member

Lithology
- Primary: Lime mudstone

Location
- Coordinates: 20.8°N 99.3°W
- Approximate paleocoordinates: 18.9°N 64.5°W
- Region: Hidalgo
- Country: Mexico
- El Doctor Formation (Mexico) El Doctor Formation (Hidalgo)

The El Doctor Formation is a geologic formation in Mexico. It preserves fossils dating back to the Albian and Cenomanian stages of the Cretaceous period. Ammonite fossils show that age of Late Albian is more likely.

== Description ==
The light grey micritic limestone sequence with intercalated black chert lenses was deposited in an open marine basin with a hypersaline and/or poorly oxygenated bottom.

== Fossil content ==
The formation has provided the following fossils:

Fish

- Squalicorax falcatus
- Ptychodus decurrens
- Rajiformes
- Enchodus zimapanensis
- Xeneichthys yanesi
- Heckelichthys preopercularis
- Motlayoichthys sergioi
- Nunaneichthys mexicanus
- Ichthyotringa mexicana
- Muhichthys cordobai
- Dalgoichthys tropicalis
- Handuichthys interopercularis
- Pseudomonocentris microspinosus
- Araripichthys sp.
- Vinctifer sp.
- Pachyrhizodus sp.
- cf. Tselfatia
- Pycnodontiformes
- Cladocyclidae
- Elopiformes
- Gonorhynchiformes
- Mawsoniidae

Arthropods

- Aeger hidalguensis
- Polzia eldoctorensis
- Victoriacaris muhiensis
- Palinurus sp.

=== Ammonites ===
- Mortoniceras sp.
- Hamites aff. renzi
- Beudanticeras sp.

=== Echinoderms ===
- Echinoidea
- Crinoidea

== See also ==
- List of fossiliferous stratigraphic units in Mexico
  - Sierra Madre Formation
