= Spondylosis deformans =

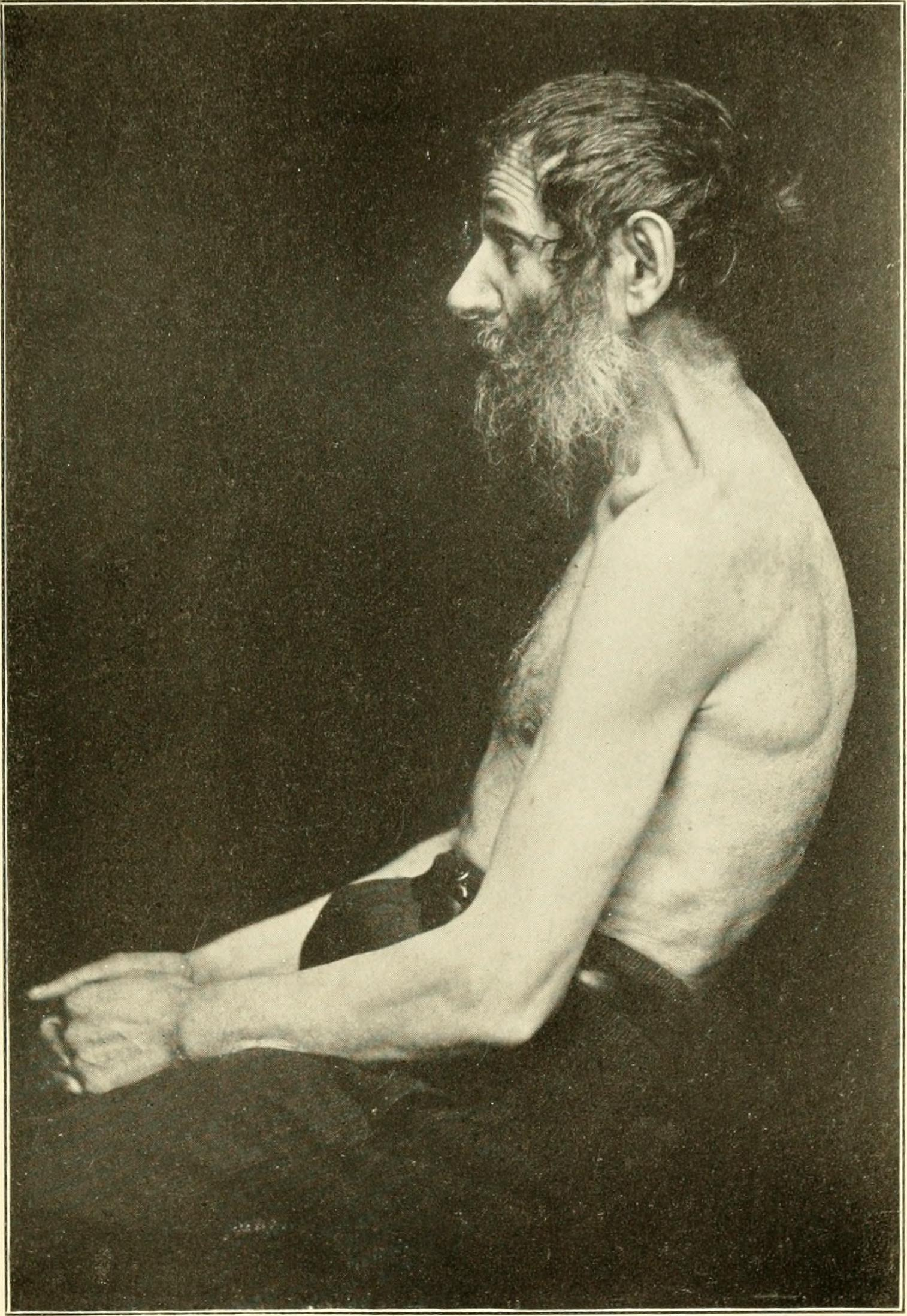
- Patient with spondylosis deformans

Spondylosis deformans is a disease of the spine in humans and other vertebrates. It occurs when intervertebral discs begin to degenerate, leading to the formation of bony spurs or bridges around the disc and nearby spinal joints. Severe cases can result in pressure on the spinal nerves, causing neurological signs and symptoms. Other terms for the disease have included spondylitis, but this is incorrect because it implies that the condition is inflammatory in nature, like ankylosing spondylitis.

The condition is likely triggered by changes in the anulus fibrosus, the tough outer ring of the intervertebral disc. This disc degeneration causes osteophytes to grow in the area. The osteophytes develop bridges of connective tissue which become ossified, forming bone spurs. The pattern of osteophyte formation varies. The exact pathophysiology of the process is unclear.
