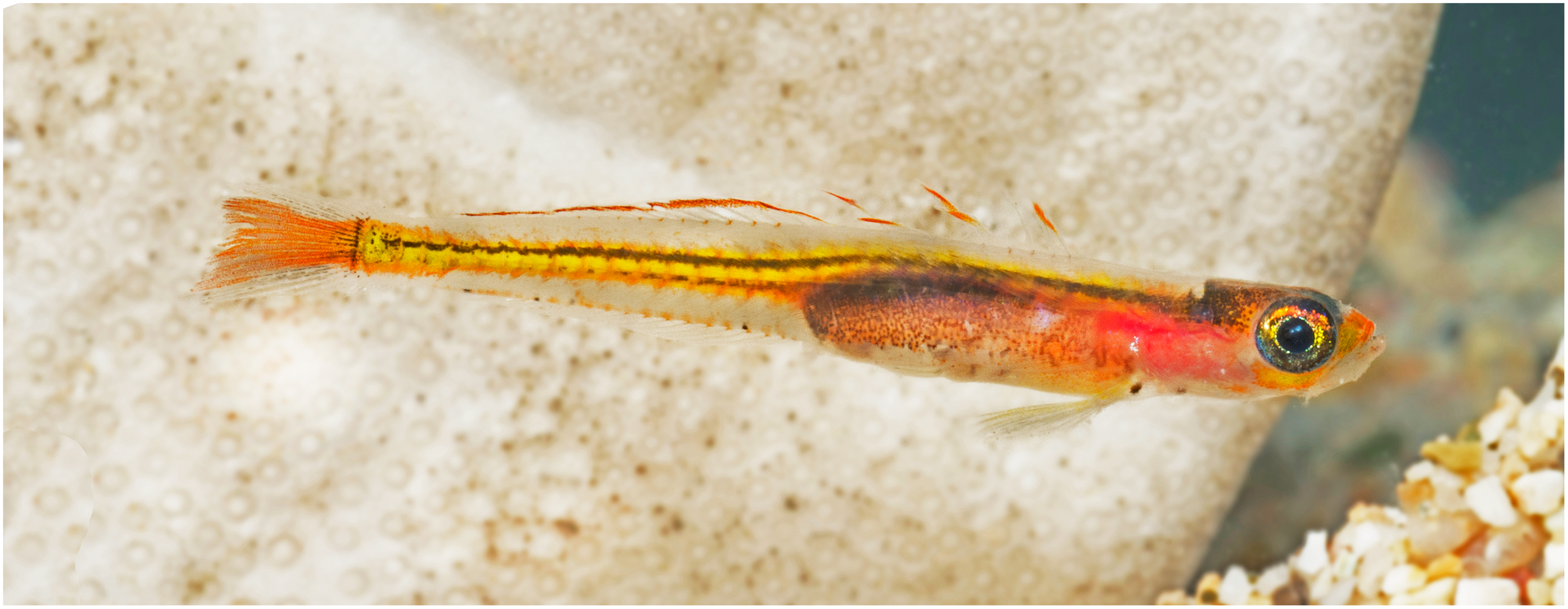
- Palatogobius incendius

Scientific classification
- Kingdom: Animalia
- Phylum: Chordata
- Class: Actinopterygii
- Order: Gobiiformes
- Family: Gobiidae
- Genus: Palatogobius; C. R. Gilbert, 1971

Type species
- Palatogobius paradoxus C. R. Gilbert, 1971

= Palatogobius =

Genus of fishes

Palatogobius is a genus of gobies native to the western Atlantic Ocean.

== Species ==
There are currently three recognized species in this genus:

- Palatogobius grandoculus D. W. Greenfield, 2002
- Palatogobius incendius Tornabene, Robertson & Baldwin, 2017
- Palatogobius paradoxus C. R. Gilbert, 1971 (Mauve goby)
