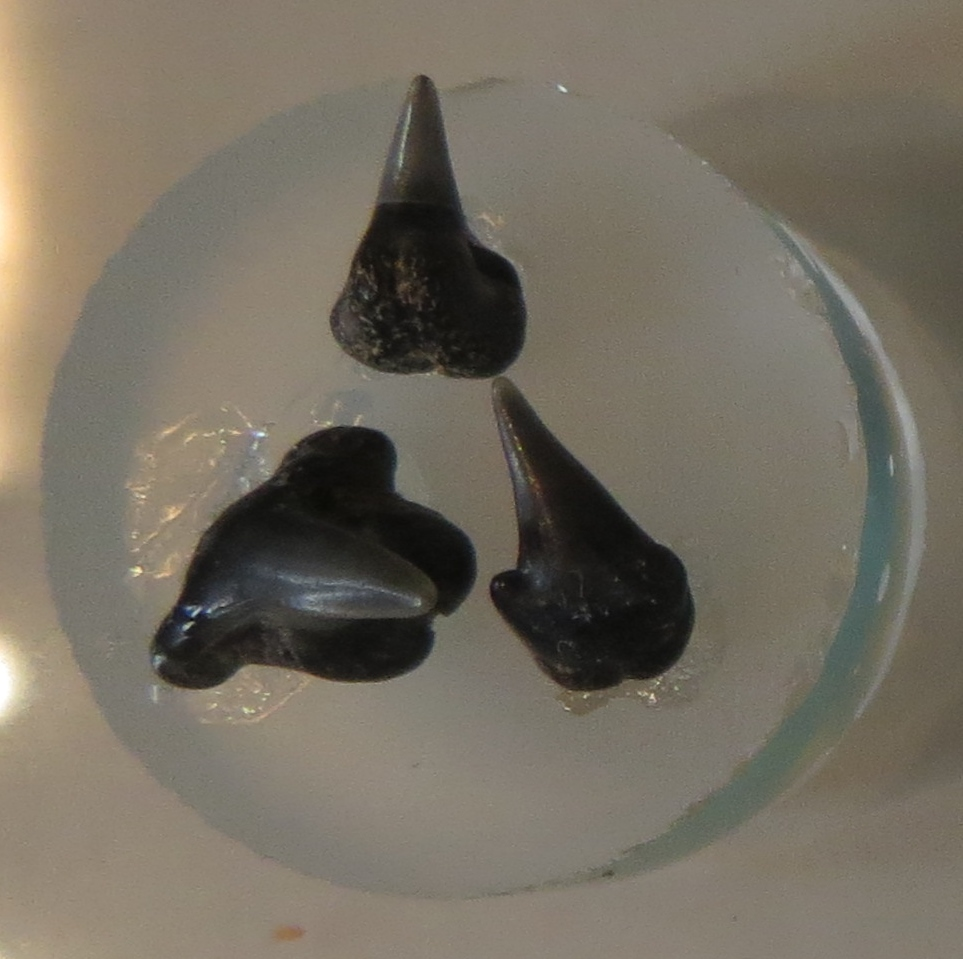
- Teeth of E. angusta.

Scientific classification
- Kingdom: Animalia
- Phylum: Chordata
- Class: Chondrichthyes
- Subclass: Elasmobranchii
- Division: Selachii
- Order: Orectolobiformes
- Family: Brachaeluridae
- Genus: †Eostegostoma; Herman and Crochard 1977

= Eostegostoma =

Extinct genus of sharks

Eostegostoma is an extinct genus of prehistoric cartilaginous fish from the Eocene epoch of Belgium and from the Oligocene (Rupelian) of Alabama (United States).
