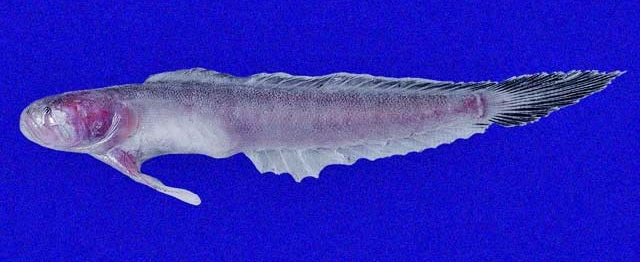
- Akko brevis

Scientific classification
- Kingdom: Animalia
- Phylum: Chordata
- Class: Actinopterygii
- Order: Gobiiformes
- Family: Gobiidae
- Subfamily: Gobiinae
- Genus: Akko; Birdsong & C. R. Robins, 1995

Type species
- Akko dionaea Birdsong & C. R. Robins, 1995

= Akko (fish) =

Genus of fishes

Akko is a genus of gobies native to the Atlantic and Pacific coasts of the Americas.

== Species ==
This genus contains three species:

- Akko brevis (Günther, 1864)
- Akko dionaea Birdsong & C. R. Robins, 1995
- Akko rossi Van Tassell & C. C. Baldwin, 2004
