= Antilligobius =

Scientific classification
- Domain: Eukaryota
- Kingdom: Animalia
- Phylum: Chordata
- Class: Actinopterygii
- Order: Gobiiformes
- Family: Gobiidae
- Genus: Antilligobius
- Species: A. nikkiae

Binomial name
- Antilligobius nikkiae Van Tassell, Tornabene & P. L. Colin, 2012

Genus of fishes

Antilligobius is a genus of goby. It contains only the species Antilligobius nikkiae, the sabre goby, which is native to deep waters of the western Atlantic Ocean. The specific name honours Nicole Laura Schrier, the daughter of the owner of the Sea Aquarium in Curaçao, who collected many of the type specimens.
