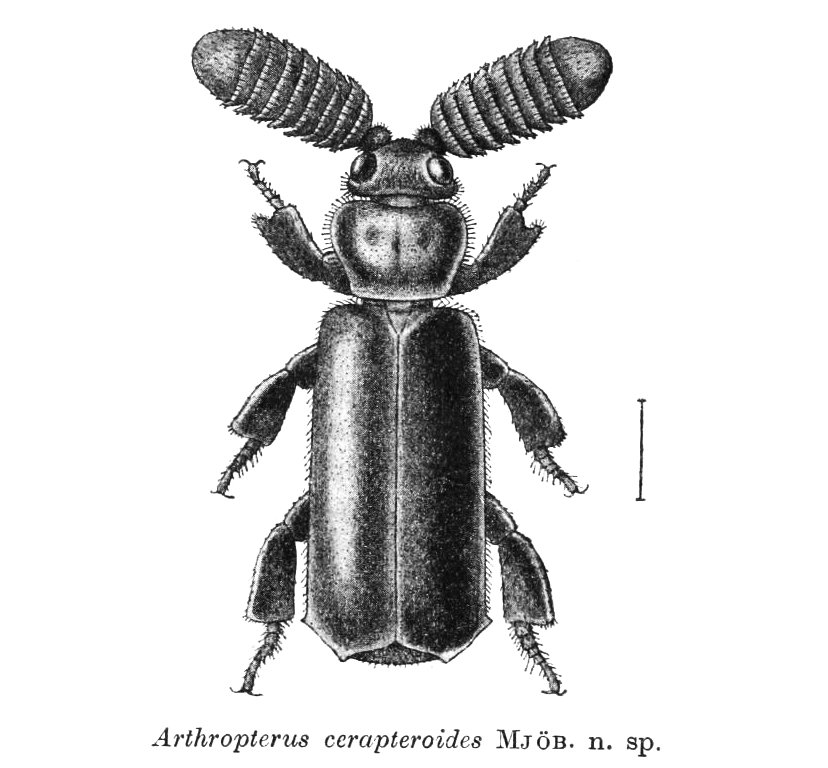
- Arthropterus cerapteroides

Scientific classification
- Kingdom: Animalia
- Phylum: Arthropoda
- Clade: Pancrustacea
- Class: Insecta
- Order: Coleoptera
- Suborder: Adephaga
- Family: Carabidae
- Subfamily: Paussinae
- Genus: Arthropterus; W.S.MacLeay, 1838

= Arthropterus =

Genus of beetles

Arthropterus is a genus in the beetle family Carabidae. There are more than 60 described species in Arthropterus, found in Australia.

== Species ==
These 67 species belong to the genus Arthropterus:

- Arthropterus abnormis Oike, 1932
- Arthropterus ambitiosus Kolbe, 1924
- Arthropterus angulatus W.J.MacLeay, 1873
- Arthropterus angulicornis W.J.MacLeay, 1873
- Arthropterus articularis Elston, 1919
- Arthropterus bisinuatus W.J.MacLeay, 1873
- Arthropterus brevicollis W.J.MacLeay, 1873
- Arthropterus brevis (Westwood, 1850)
- Arthropterus brunni Kolbe, 1924
- Arthropterus cerapteroides Mjöberg, 1916
- Arthropterus constricticeps Sloane, 1933
- Arthropterus cribrosus Sloane, 1933
- Arthropterus cylindricus Masters, 1886
- Arthropterus daemelianus Kolbe, 1924
- Arthropterus darlingensis W.J.MacLeay, 1873
- Arthropterus denudatus (Westwood, 1850)
- Arthropterus depressus W.J.MacLeay, 1873
- Arthropterus discrepans Kolbe, 1924
- Arthropterus donovani Kolbe, 1924
- Arthropterus elongatulus W.J.MacLeay, 1871
- Arthropterus eruditulus Kolbe, 1924
- Arthropterus foveicollis W.J.MacLeay, 1873
- Arthropterus foveipennis Blackburn, 1892
- Arthropterus fraternus Kolbe, 1924
- Arthropterus geminus Kolbe, 1924
- Arthropterus hirtus W.J.MacLeay, 1873
- Arthropterus hopii (Westwood, 1843)
- Arthropterus horni Kolbe, 1924
- Arthropterus howittensis Masters, 1886
- Arthropterus howittii W.J.MacLeay, 1873
- Arthropterus insidiosus Kolbe, 1924
- Arthropterus kingii W.J.MacLeay, 1873
- Arthropterus limitans Kolbe, 1924
- Arthropterus longicollis Sloane, 1933
- Arthropterus macleaii (Donovan, 1805)
- Arthropterus mastersii W.J.MacLeay, 1871
- Arthropterus negligens Kolbe, 1924
- Arthropterus nigricornis W.J.MacLeay, 1873
- Arthropterus novellus Kolbe, 1924
- Arthropterus occidentalis Blackburn, 1892
- Arthropterus ominosus Kolbe, 1924
- Arthropterus ovicollis W.J.MacLeay, 1873
- Arthropterus parallelocerus (Westwood, 1850)
- Arthropterus pellax Kolbe, 1924
- Arthropterus pervicax Kolbe, 1924
- Arthropterus petax Kolbe, 1924
- Arthropterus piceus (Westwood, 1838)
- Arthropterus planicornis Sloane, 1933
- Arthropterus punctatissimus (Westwood, 1874)
- Arthropterus puncticollis W.J.MacLeay, 1873
- Arthropterus queenslandiae Wasmann, 1926
- Arthropterus riverinae W.J.MacLeay, 1873
- Arthropterus rockhamptonensis W.J.MacLeay, 1873
- Arthropterus schismaticus Kolbe, 1924
- Arthropterus schroederi Kolbe, 1924
- Arthropterus secedens Kolbe, 1924
- Arthropterus simiolus Kolbe, 1924
- Arthropterus socius Kolbe, 1924
- Arthropterus spadiceus Kolbe, 1924
- Arthropterus subampliatus W.J.MacLeay, 1873
- Arthropterus subangulatus Kolbe, 1924
- Arthropterus subsulcatus (Westwood, 1850)
- Arthropterus turneri W.J.MacLeay, 1873
- Arthropterus waterhousei W.J.MacLeay, 1873
- Arthropterus westwoodii W.J.MacLeay, 1871
- Arthropterus wilsoni (Westwood, 1850)
- † Arthropterus kuehlii Stein, 1877
