= Eokrefftia =

Eokrefftia Temporal range: Late Paleocene to Late Oligocene

Scientific classification
- Kingdom: Animalia
- Phylum: Chordata
- Class: Actinopterygii
- Division: Teleostei
- Order: Myctophiformes
- Family: Myctophidae
- Genus: †Eokrefftia; Schwarzhans, 1985

Type species
- †Eokrefftia prediaphus Schwarzhans, 1985

Species
- †E. paviai Schwarzhans & Carnevale, 2024; †E. prediaphus Schwarzhans, 1985; †E. sulci (Nolf, 1988)

Extinct genus of fishes

Eokrefftia ("dawn Krefftia") is an extinct genus of lanternfish that inhabited the seas around Europe and Australia throughout the Paleogene. Known only from its distinctive fossilized otoliths, it appears to be one of the earliest definitive fossil members of the lanternfish lineage. It may belong to the extinct subfamily Eomyctophinae.

The following species are known:

- †E. paviai Schwarzhans & Carnevale, 2024 - late Oligocene of Italy (Antognola Formation)
- †E. prediaphus Schwarzhans, 1985 (type species) - late Paleocene of South Australia (Dartmoor Formation)
- †E. sulci (Nolf, 1988) - Early to Late Eocene (Ypresian to Priabonian) of Italy (Marne di Monte Piano Formation), Middle Eocene (Lutetian) of France (Aquitaine Basin) (=Diaphus sulci Nolf, 1988)

The otoliths of Eokrefftia can be easily confused with those of the extant lanternfish genus Diaphus, which are also present as fossils in the same deposits.
