= Isaac Ginsburg =

American ichthyologist (1886–1975)

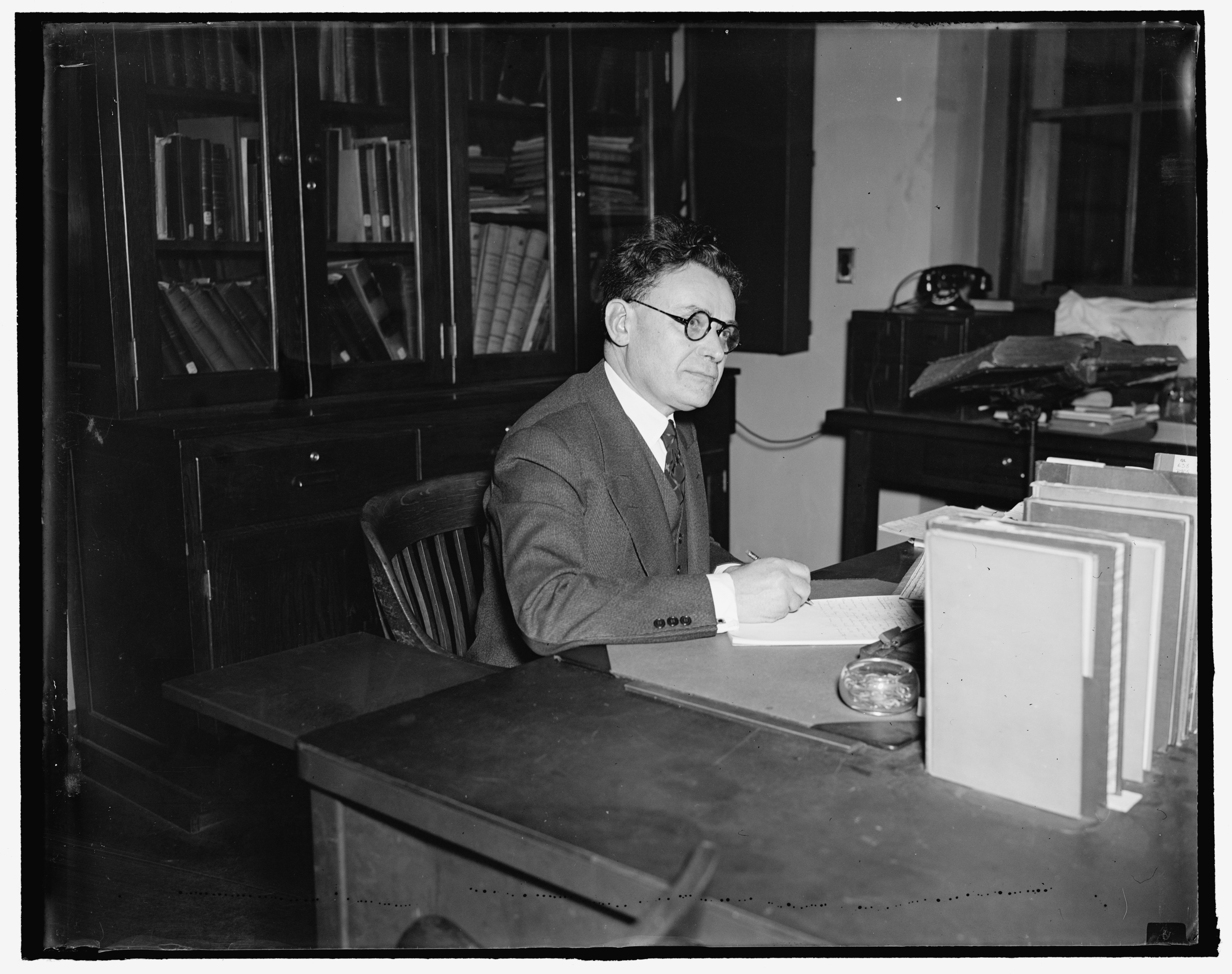
- Born: August 19, 1886; Lithuania
- Died: September 2, 1975 (aged 89); Arlington, Virginia
- Scientific career
- Fields: Ichthyology

Isaac Ginsburg (August 9, 1886 – September 2, 1975) was a Lithuanian-born American ichthyologist.

== Biography ==
=== Early life ===
Ginsburg was born in Lithuania in 1886. He immigrated to the United States during his childhood. He attended Cornell University in Ithaca, New York, where he studied ichthyology.

=== Career and later years ===
In 1917, Ginsburg worked as an aid for the Division of Fishes at the United States National Museum. He was appointed to the United States Bureau of Fisheries in 1922 and continued to work there throughout his career. He handled correspondence over marine fish and studied many fish species and their subdivisions. From 1943 to 1944, he was also involved in war work concerning the coordination of fisheries.

Ginsburg was interested in studying the marine fish of the Gulf of Mexico. He was one of the first ichthyologists to note the subtle differences between fish from the gulf and those from the southeastern United States. Ginsburg intended to start a large project devoted to the study of the gulf fish, but most of his time was ultimately spent on the revisionary work which was required. Ginsburg retired in 1956. He determined that swordfish should be considered kosher, as he found that swordfish have microscopic scales. A sign attesting to this fact hung for many years in the Citarella fish market in Manhattan.

He retired from the Bureau of Commercial Fisheries in 1956 and became a Research Associate of the Fish Division, U.S. National Museum, for three years starting in 1957. He died in 1975 in Arlington, Virginia after a long illness.

== Taxon described by him ==
- See Category:Taxa named by Isaac Ginsburg
