= Jocelyn Nungaray National Wildlife Refuge =

Wildlife refuge in Chambers County, Texas

- IUCN category IV (habitat/species management area)
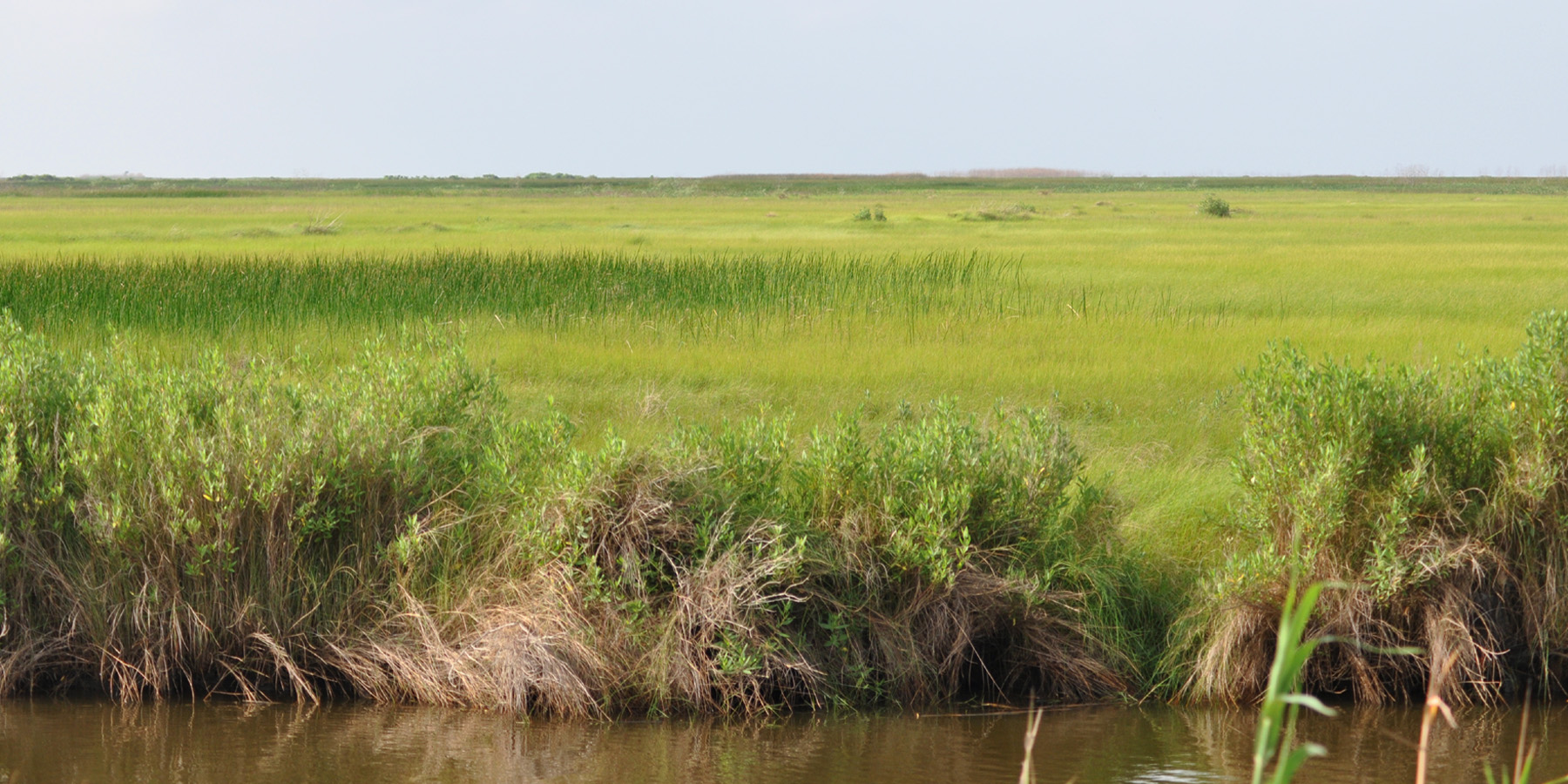
- Marshes and grasslands in the refuge

- Location within Texas Location within the United States
- Location: Chambers County, Texas, United States
- Nearest city: Anahuac, Texas
- Coordinates: 29°34′0″N 94°28′0″W
- Area: 34,000 acres or 140 km^{2}
- Governing body: United States Fish and Wildlife Service
- Website: Jocelyn Nungaray National Wildlife Refuge

Jocelyn Nungaray National Wildlife Refuge Act
- Long title: An Act to rename the Anahuac National Wildlife Refuge located in the State of Texas as the "Jocelyn Nungaray National Wildlife Refuge".
- Enacted by: the 119th United States Congress
- Effective: July 24, 2025

Citations
- Public law: Pub. L. 119–30 (text) (PDF)
- Statutes at Large: 139 Stat. 473

Codification
- Acts amended: 16 U.S.C. 668dd note

Legislative history
- Introduced in the Senate as S. 1596 by John Cornyn; Committee consideration by Environment and Public Works; Passed the Senate on May 13, 2025 (Voice vote); Passed the House on July 14, 2025 (Voice vote (under suspension of the rules)); Signed into law by President Donald Trump on July 24, 2025

The Jocelyn Nungaray National Wildlife Refuge, formerly the Anahuac National Wildlife Refuge, is a wildlife conservation area along the coast of Texas, southeast of Anahuac, Texas. It borders the East Bay, part of the Galveston Bay complex.

== Name ==
The refuge was originally named after nearby Anahuac, Texas, which is in turn named after the Mexican term Anahuac. Anahuac means "place beside the waters" in Nahuatl, the language of the Aztecs.

On March 4, 2025, during his second term's first address to a joint session of Congress, President Donald Trump announced he had signed an executive order (14229) to rename the refuge after Jocelyn Nungaray, a 12-year-old girl from nearby Houston who was killed in June 2024. On July 24, 2025, Trump signed the Jocelyn Nungaray National Wildlife Refuge Act, which officially codified the new name into law.

== History ==
Established in 1963 as the Anahuac NWR, the Jocelyn Nungaray National Wildlife Refuge is located on the upper Texas Coast in Chambers County. The refuge protects approximately 34,000 acres (140 km^{2}) of coastal marsh and prairies. The refuge offers opportunities for fishing, waterfowl hunting, paddling, and wildlife viewing. A large network of volunteers contributes thousands of hours in support of the refuge.

In the winter, the refuge hosts large concentrations of waterfowl, making it a popular site for public hunting. Other signature species are American alligator, bobcat, yellow rail, and purple gallinule. Birdwatchers find the refuge an excellent place to observe neotropical migrants in the spring and fall. Other species sought by birdwatchers include American bittern, seaside sparrow, fulvous whistling-duck and black rail. Volunteers have been working to compile a butterfly list for the refuge. More than 60 species have been identified, including the extremely localized bay skipper (Euphyes bayensis).

Recent projects to enhance and restore the habitat at the refuge include control of invasive species like Chinese tallow, prairie restoration, creation of moist soil areas, and a colonial waterbird rookery.

Jocelyn Nungaray National Wildlife Refuge is one of more than 560 refuges that comprise the U.S. National Wildlife Refuge System, a national network of lands and waters set aside for the benefit of wildlife. It has been designated as a site of international importance to shorebirds by the Western Hemisphere Shorebird Reserve Network. The refuge is designated as part of the Great Texas Coastal Birding Trail, a network of trails and wildlife viewing sites established by the Texas Parks and Wildlife Department.

== Fauna ==
=== Mammals ===
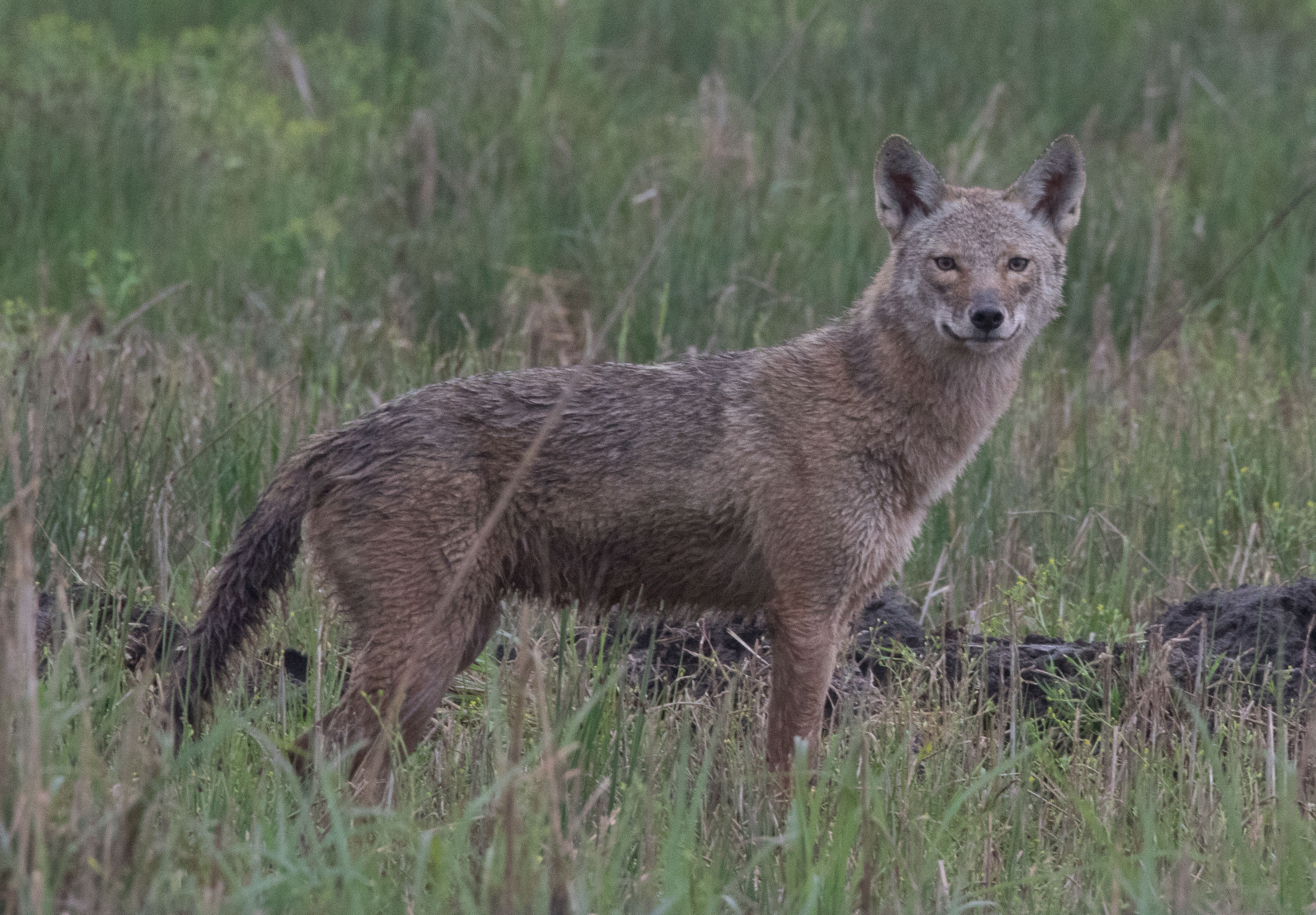
A Southeastern coyote at Jocelyn Nungaray NWR

Some of the small mammals recorded from Chambers County include the Virginia opossum (Didelphis virginiana), nine-banded armadillo (Dasypus novemcinctus), eastern cottontail (Sylvilagus floridanus), and the swamp rabbit (Sylvilagus aquaticus), a semi-aquatic species that is in decline in Texas. Several small carnivores inhabit the refuge such as striped skunk (Mephitis mephitis), northern raccoon (Procyon lotor), long-tailed weasel (Mustela frenata), American mink (Neogale vison), northern river otter (Lontra canadensis) common gray fox (Urocyon cinereoargenteus), coyote (Canis latrans), and bobcat (Lynx rufus). White-tailed deer (Odocoileus virginianus) occur throughout the area.

Bats include the Brazilian free-tailed bat (Tadarida brasiliensis) and the Seminole bat (Lasiurus seminolus). Among the rodents are the northern pygmy mouse (Baiomys taylori), Texas marsh rice rat (Oryzomys texensis), fulvous harvest mouse (Reithrodontomys fulvescens), Baird's pocket gopher (Geomys breviceps), muskrat (Ondatra zibethicus), and American beaver (Castor canadensis). Invasive species include the Nutria (Myocastor coypus), and Feral Hog (Sus scrofa), the latter is a significant conservation threat throughout Texas.

==== Red Wolf (Canis rufus) ====
The last stronghold of naturally occurring red wolf populations was in the prairies and marshes of the upper Texas coast and adjacent areas of Louisiana. In 1962, the year before Anahuac National Wildlife Refuge was established, a study was published reporting the relatively abrupt and belated realization that red wolves were in critical decline. In 1967 U.S. Fish and Wildlife placed the red wolf on the endangered species list, the International Union for Conservation of Nature (IUCN) placed them on their red list, and by 1971 red wolves were predicted to be extinct within a decade without urgent action. The declines resulted from hunting and trapping, loss of habitat, and habitat alterations, which all allowed coyotes (Canis latrans) to expand their distribution into the red wolf's range and initiating a "hybrid swarm" or "genetic swamping" of the few remaining populations of genetically pure red wolves.

Southern Chambers County was specifically identified as having the densest population of genetically pure red wolves, with only Moore Ranch in Cameron Parish, Louisiana having comparable numbers. Biologists estimated there was a minimum of one red wolf per 12,300 acres in Chambers County, compared to one wolf per 66,600 acres in neighboring Jefferson County, estimating a total population of 92 wolves in the State of Texas in 1971. In the late 1970s U.S. Fish and Wildlife trapped over 400 wild canines in the area but only few genetically pure wolves were identified among them. Fourteen were selected for a captive breeding program, from which the current population is descended. In the final decades of the 20th century, large coyote-red wolf hybrids could be observed at the Jocelyn Nungaray National Wildlife Refuge and other locations in the region. Although it would be expected that wolf genes would diminish with each successive generation, high levels of wolf genes and characteristics seem to persist in a few populations of coyotes on the upper Texas coast, such as the Galveston Island coyote, of Galveston Island.

=== Birds ===
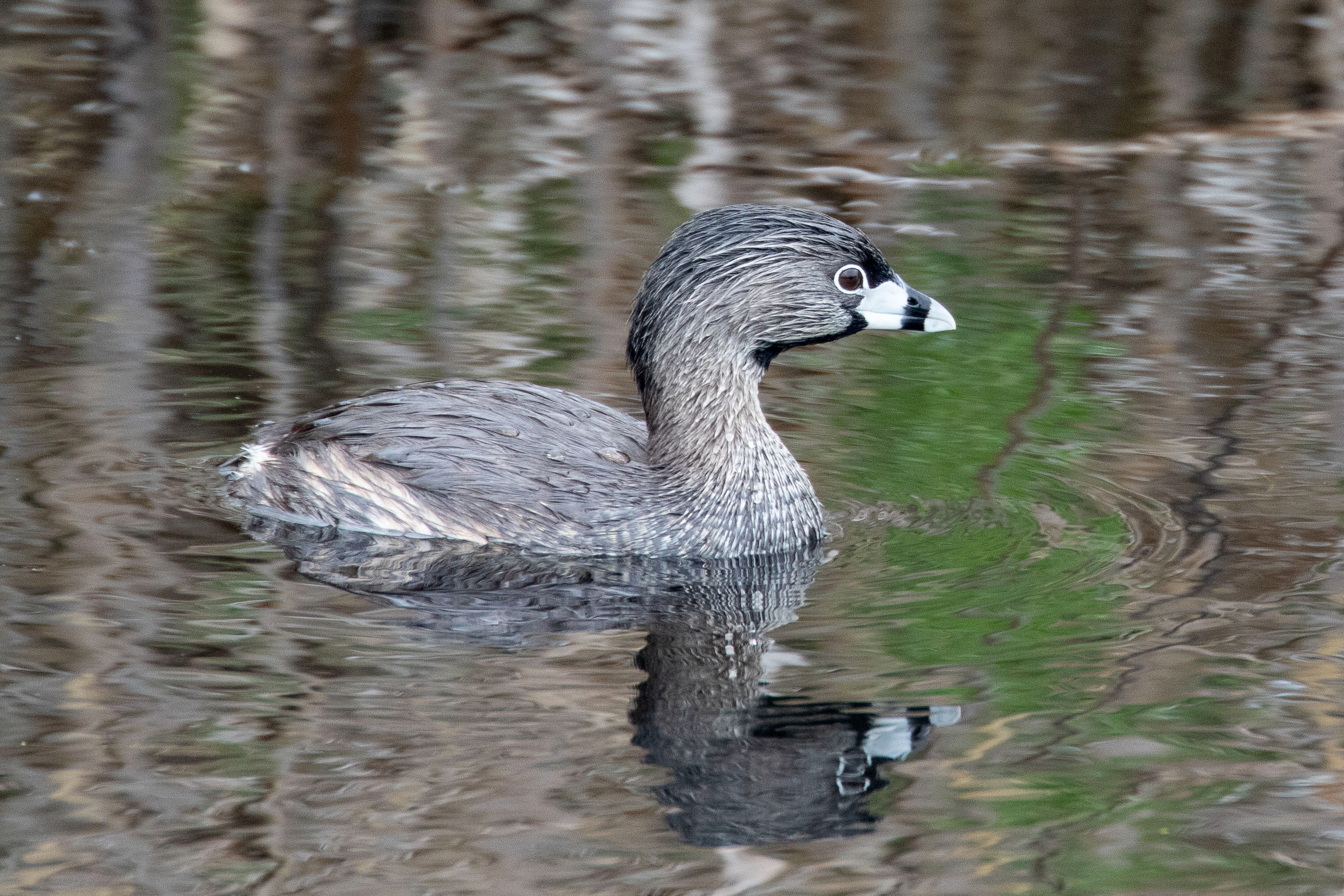
Pied-billed grebe, Jocelyn Nungaray NWR

The Jocelyn Nungaray NWR lies in the Central Flyway where many of North America's migratory birds pass through on their annual migrations. The Houston Audubon's High Island sanctuaries (located less than 2 miles southeast of the refuge), report nearly 400 species, and similar numbers should be expected on the refuge, possibly more on the refuge’s significantly larger acreage and more divers habitats and ecosystems. The refuge attracts many birdwatchers from around the world and is noted as a location where all nine species of North American rails occur, including the rare and secretive black rail (Laterallus jamaicensis).

Some of the year-round residents include the anhinga (Anhinga anhinga), reddish egret (Egretta rufescens), roseate spoonbill (Platalea ajaja), white ibis (Eudocimus albus), mottled duck (Anas fulvigula), white-tailed kite (Elanus leucurus), clapper rail (Rallus crepitans), American oystercatcher (Haematopus palliatus), royal tern (Thalasseus maximus), black skimmer (Rynchops niger), inca dove (Columbina inca), white-eyed vireo (Vireo griseus), fish crow (Corvus ossifragus), common yellowthroat (Geothlypis trichas), seaside sparrow (Ammospiza maritima), and boat-tailed grackle (Quiscalus major).

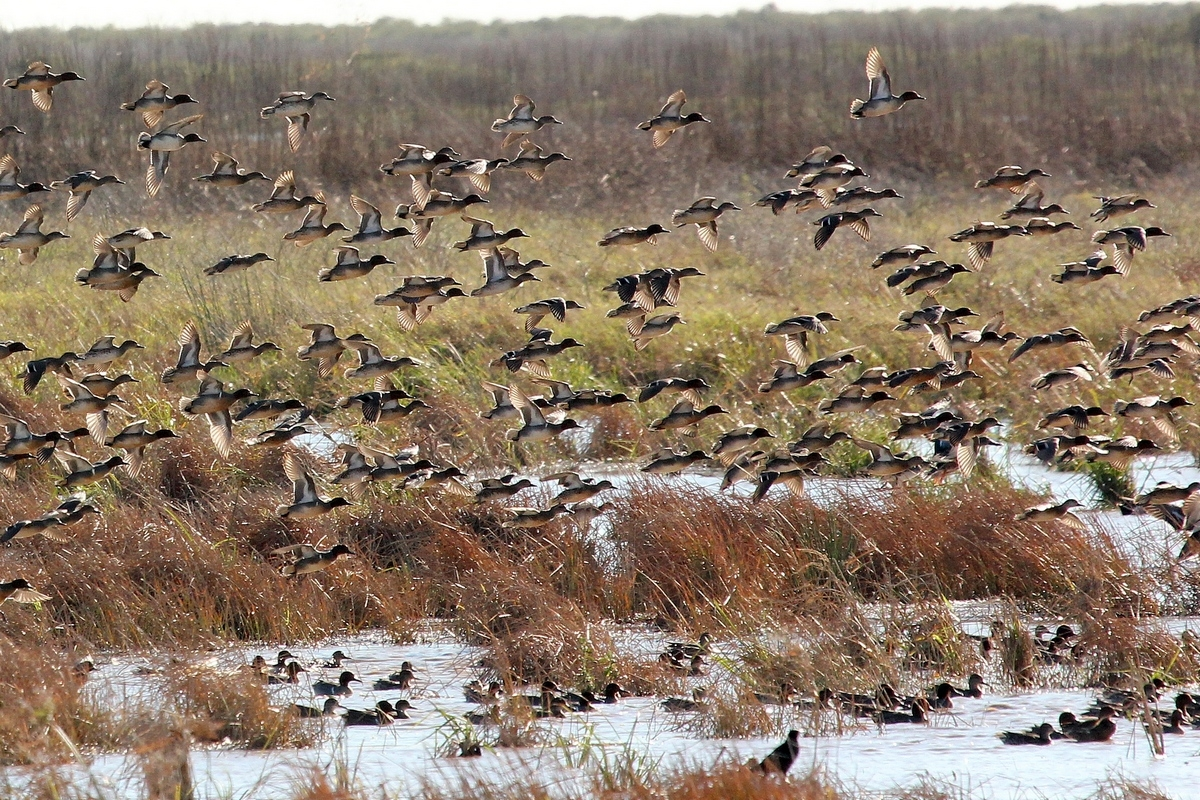
Green winged teal (Anas carolinensis), Jocelyn Nungaray NWR

Large flocks of ducks and geese spend the winter months in the marshes and wetlands on the coast of the Gulf of Mexico including the northern pintail (Anas acuta), redhead (Aythya americana), American wigeon (Mareca americana), northern shoveler (Spatula clypeata), Canada goose (Branta canadensis), cackling goose (Branta hutchinsii), and many others. Additional species of wintering birds include the snowy plover (Anarhynchus nivosus), long-billed curlew (Numenius americanus), Sandwich tern (Thalasseus sandvicensis), groove-billed ani (Crotophaga sulcirostris), vermilion flycatcher (Pyrocephalus rubinus), sedge wren (Cistothorus stellaris), Sprague's pipit (Anthus spragueii), palm warbler (Setophaga palmarum), Henslow's sparrow (Centronyx henslowii), and LeConte's sparrow (Ammospiza leconteii).

Other species nest on the upper Texas coast in the spring and summer months including the tricolored heron (Egretta tricolor), fulvous whistling-duck (Dendrocygna bicolor), black-bellied whistling-duck (Dendrocygna autumnalis), purple gallinule (Porphyrio martinica), least tern (Sternula antillarum), scissor-tailed flycatcher (Tyrannus forficatus), summer tanager (Piranga rubra), indigo bunting (Passerina cyanea), and painted bunting (Passerina ciris).

Birds photographed at Jocelyn Nungaray NWR and High Island, Texas

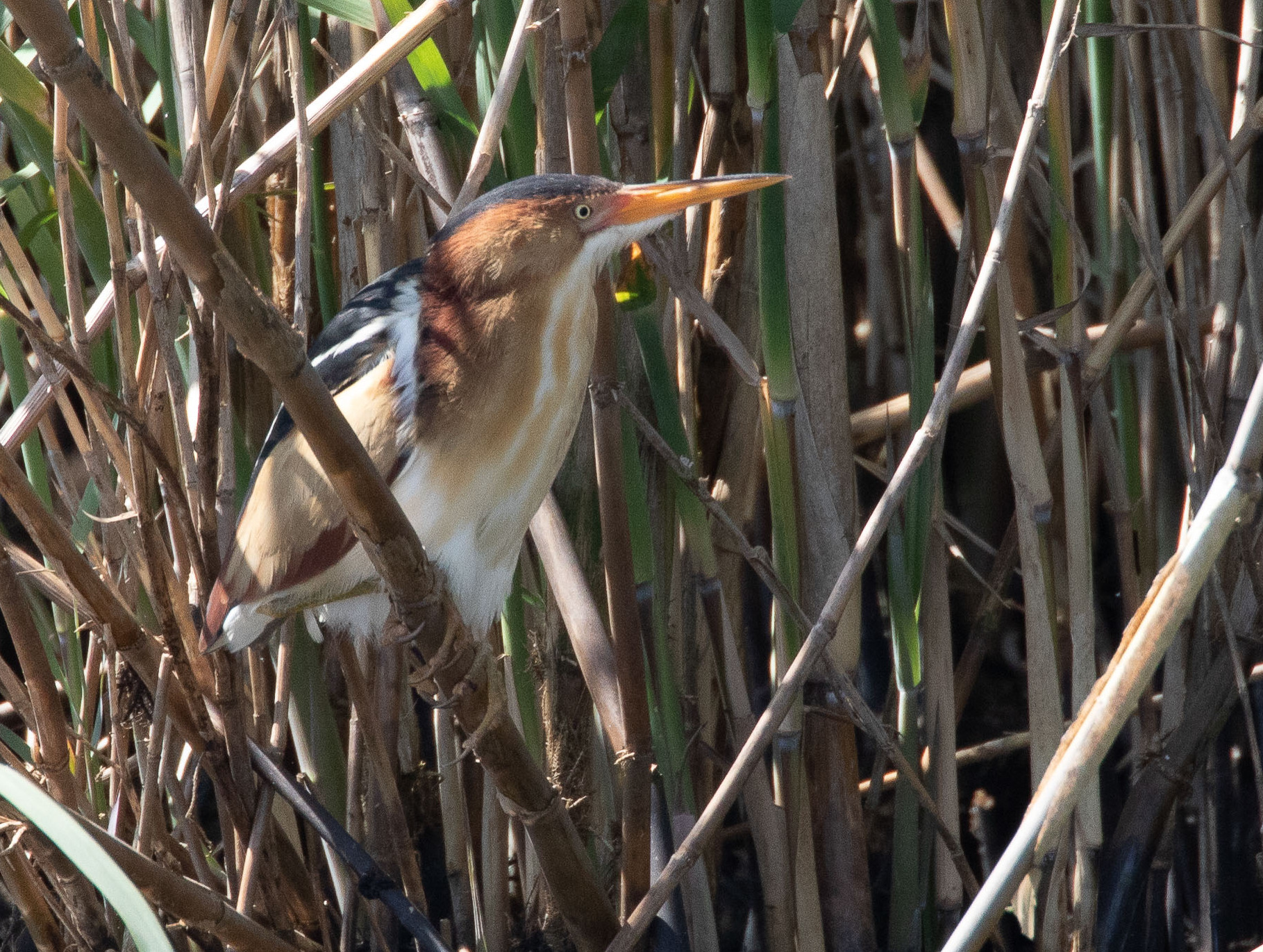
Least bittern (Botaurus exilis)

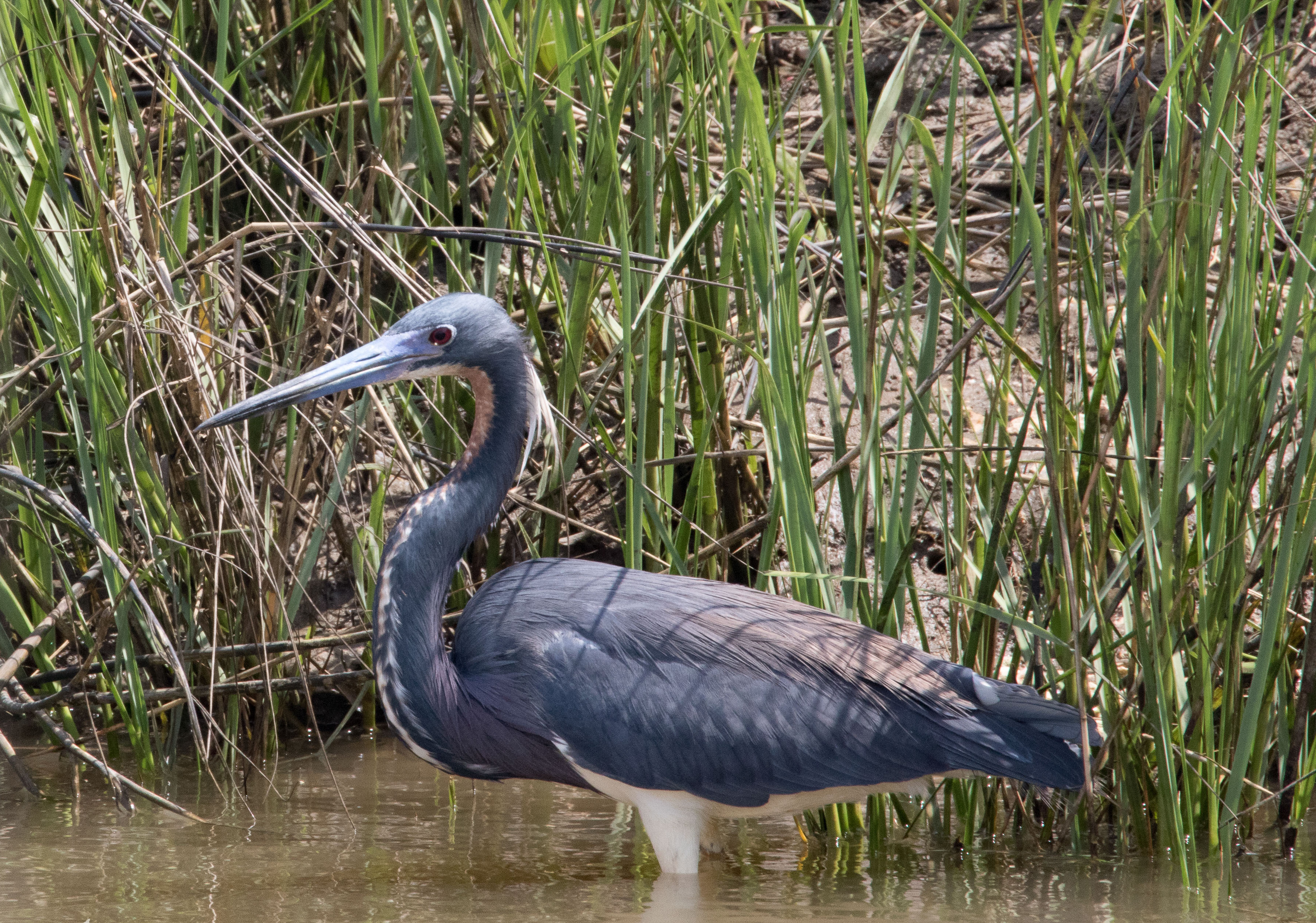
Tricolored heron (Egretta tricolor)

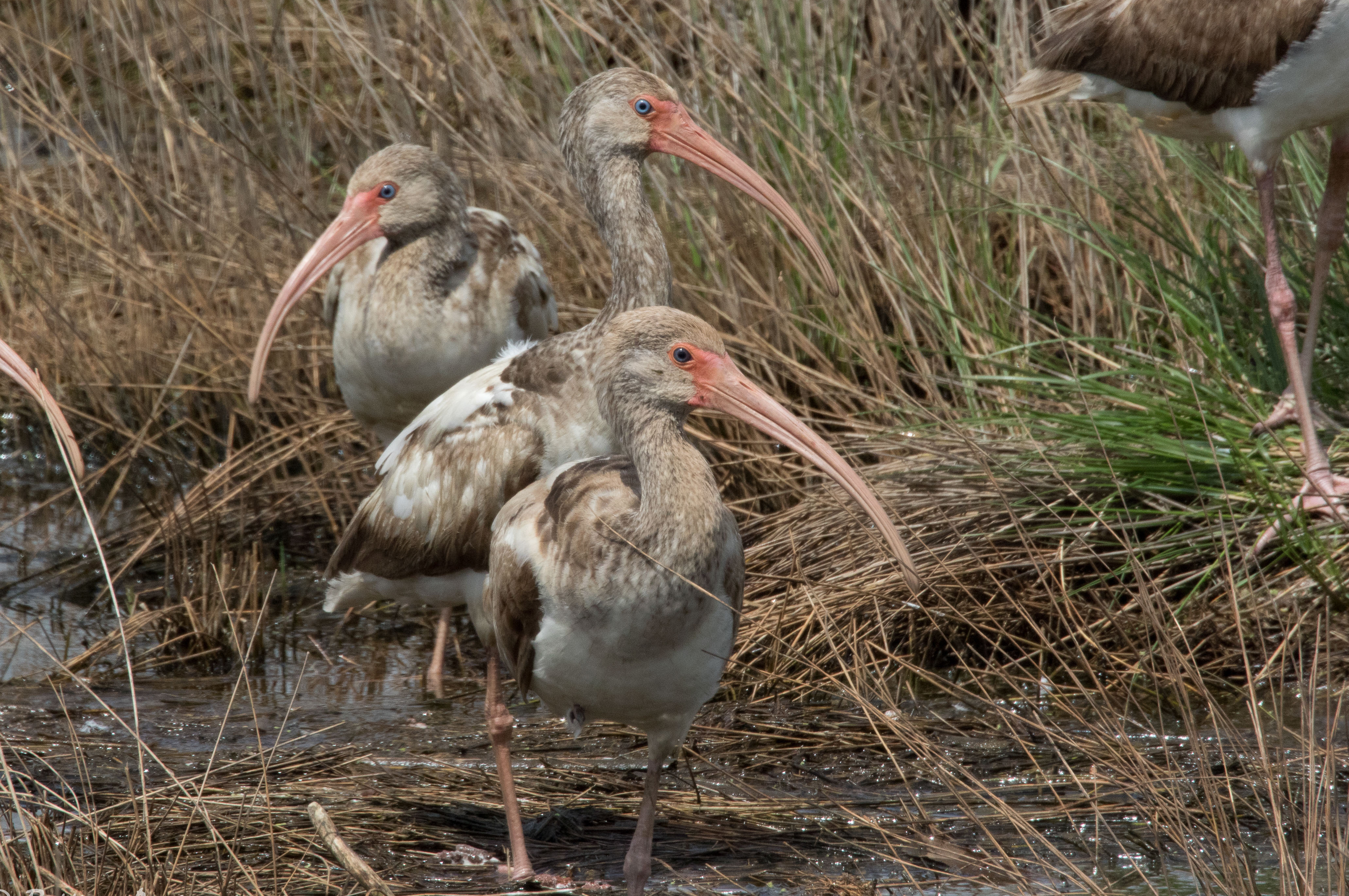
White ibis (Eudocimus albus) immature

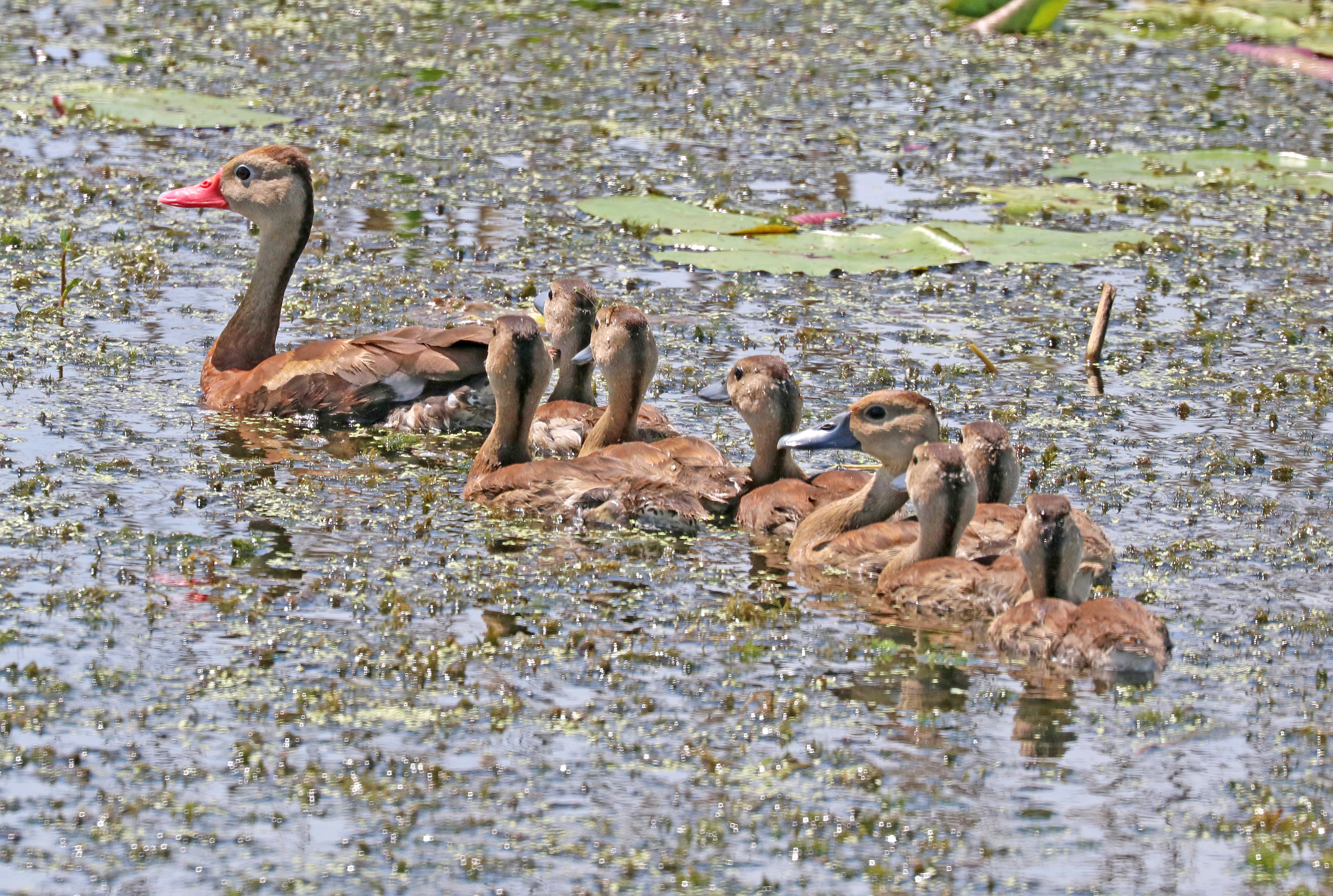
Black-bellied whistling-duck (Dendrocygna autumnalis)

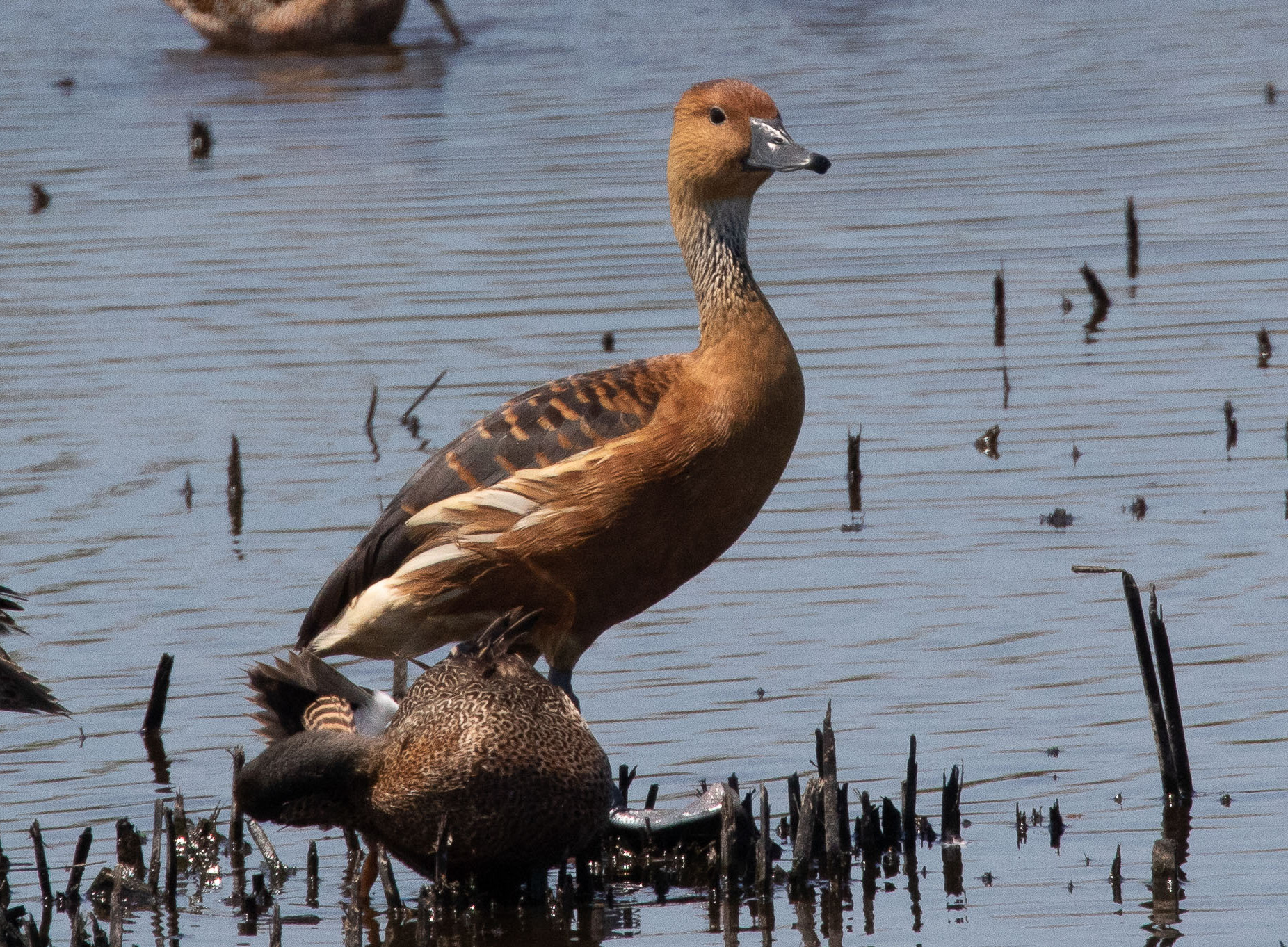
Fulvous Whistling-Duck (Dendrocygna bicolor)

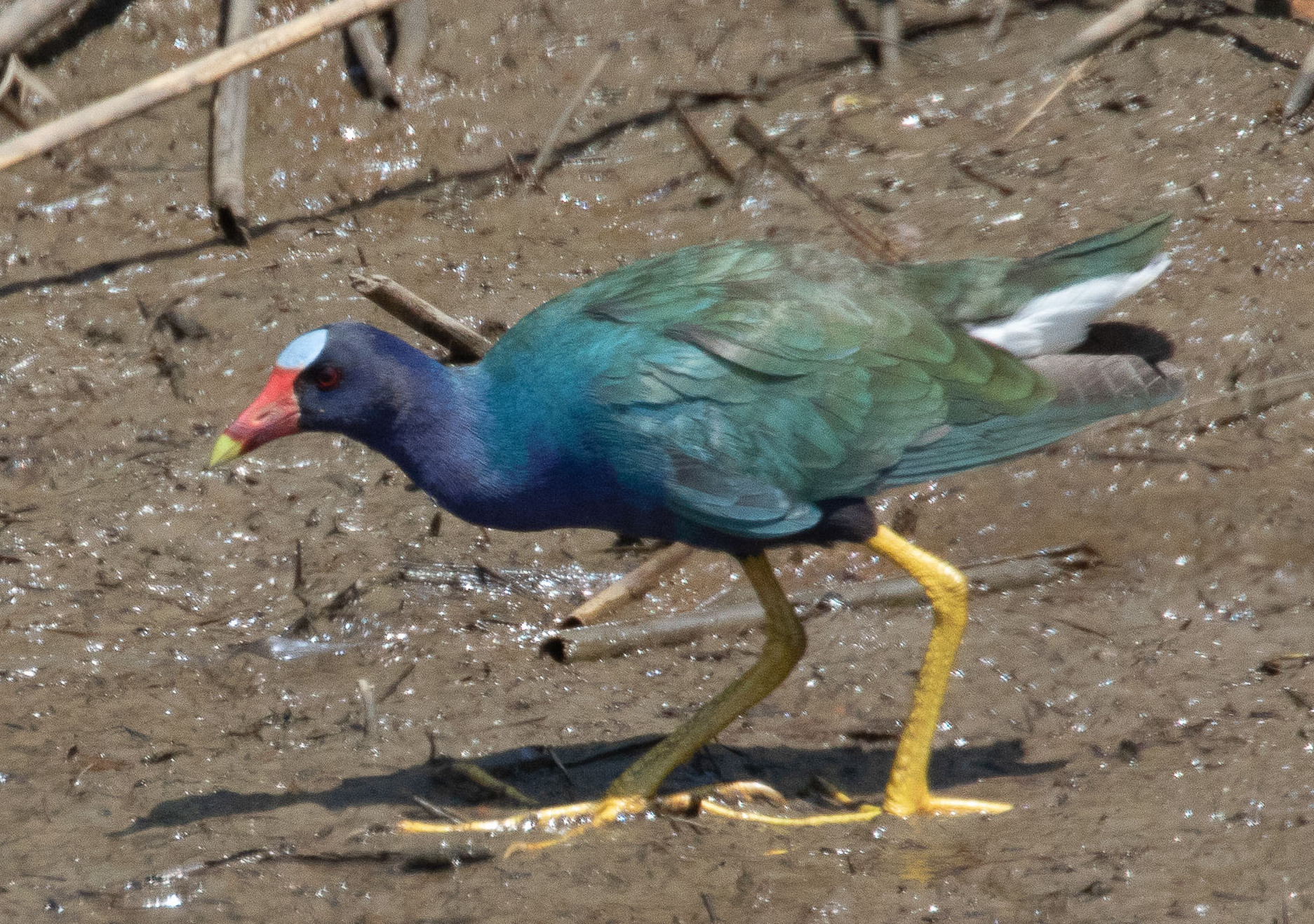
Purple gallinule (Porphyrio martinica)

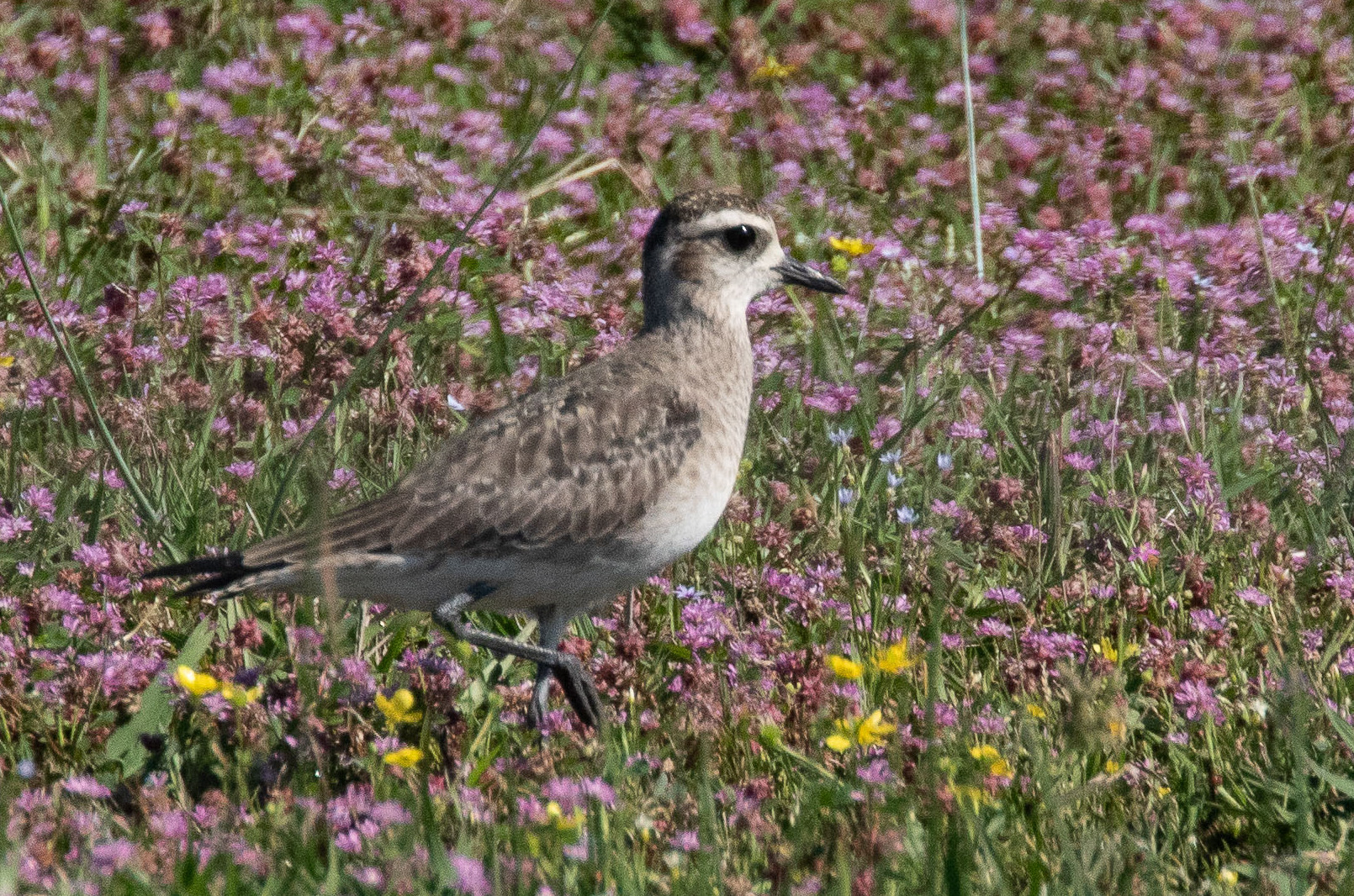
American golden-plover (Pluvialis dominica)

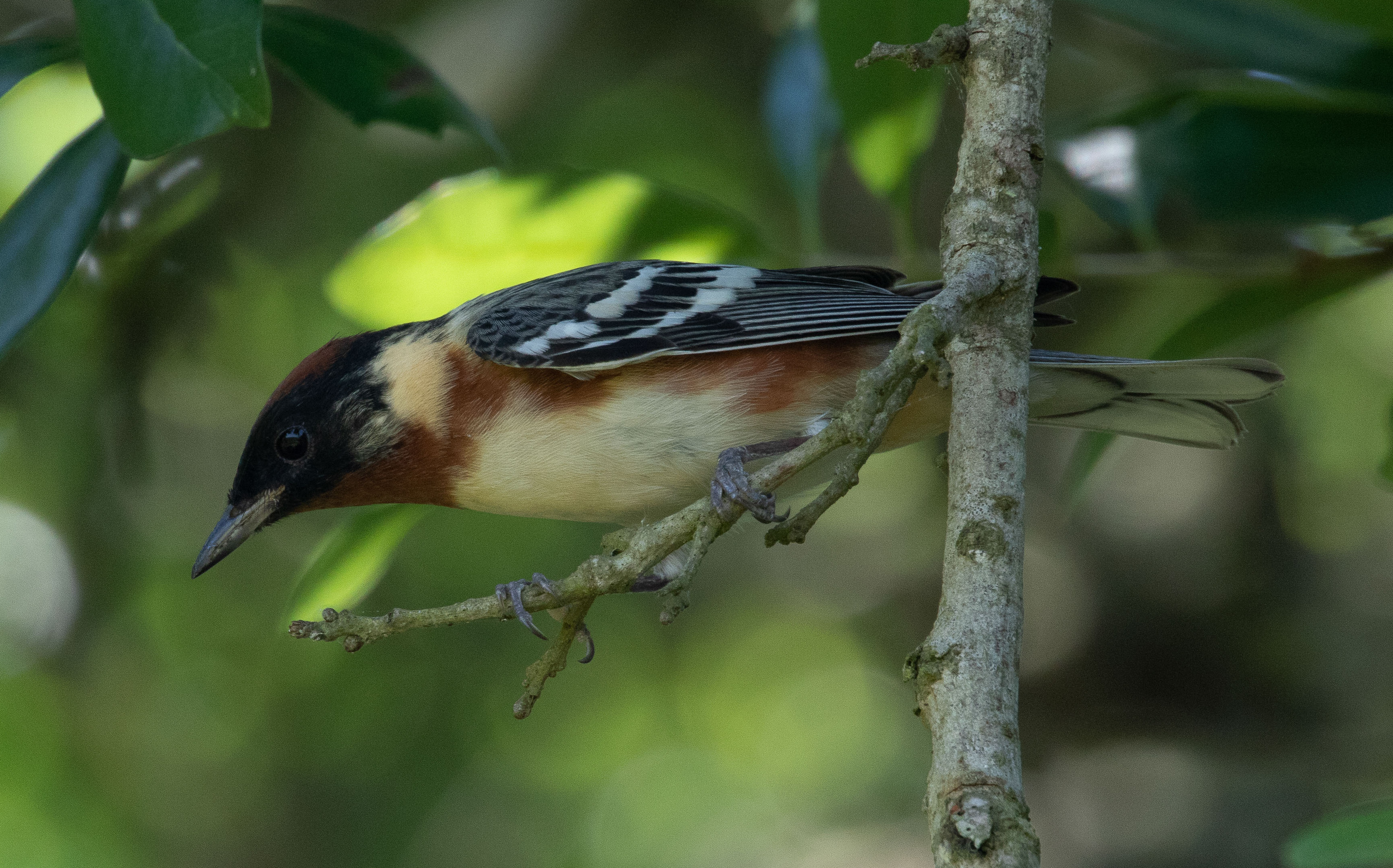
Bay-breasted warbler (Setophaga castanea) male

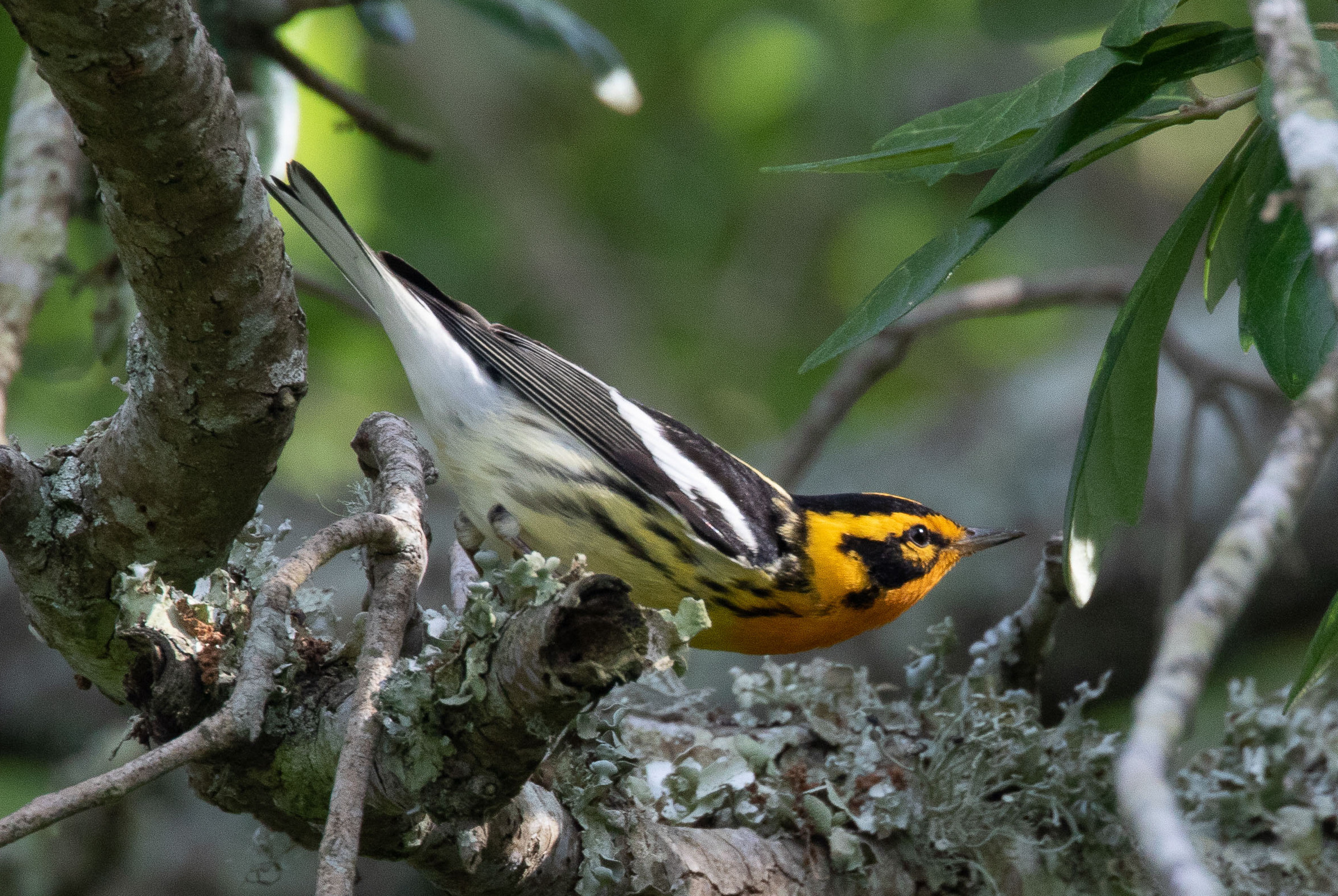
Blackburnian warbler (Setophaga fusca) male

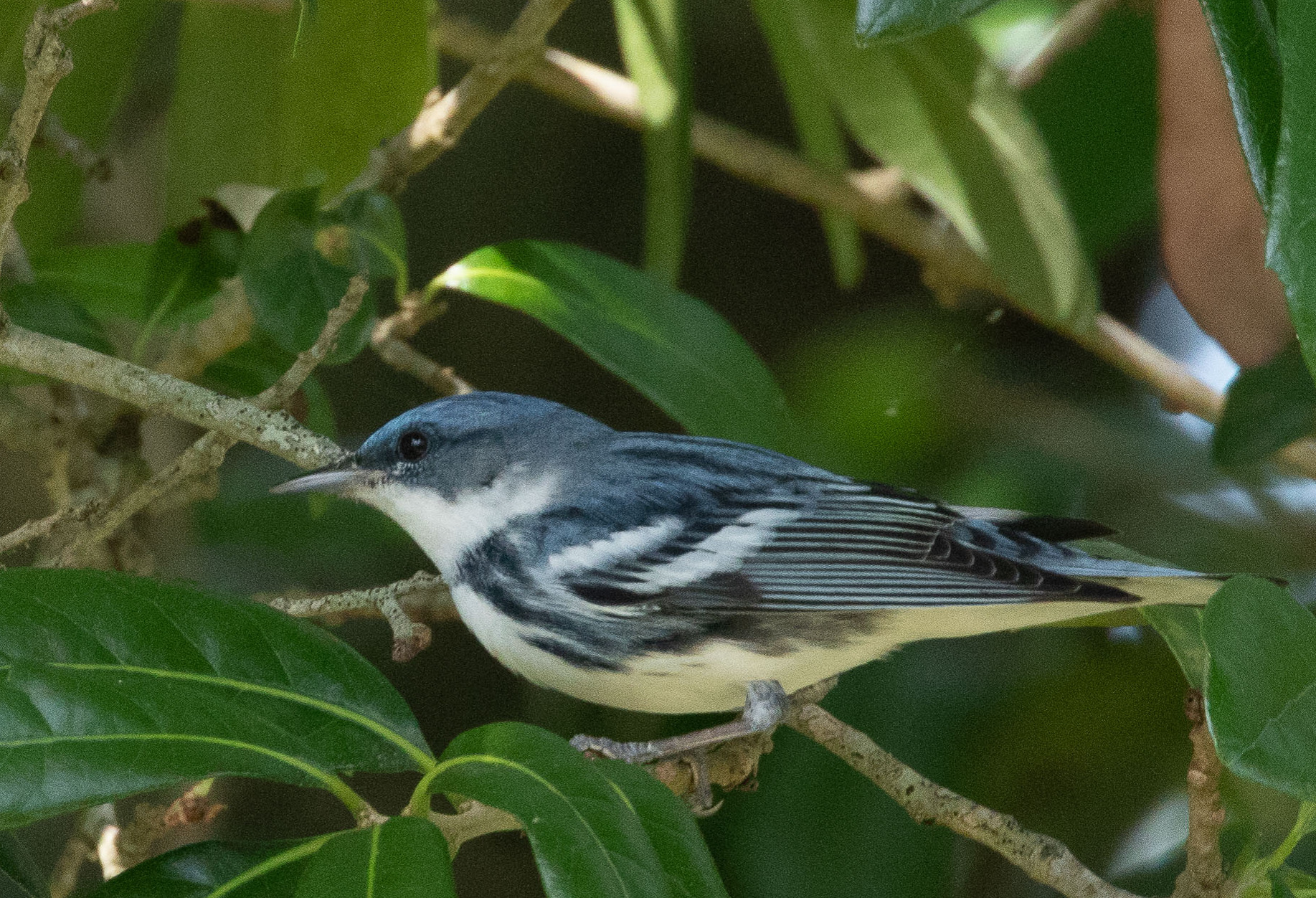
Cerulean warbler (Setophaga cerulea) male

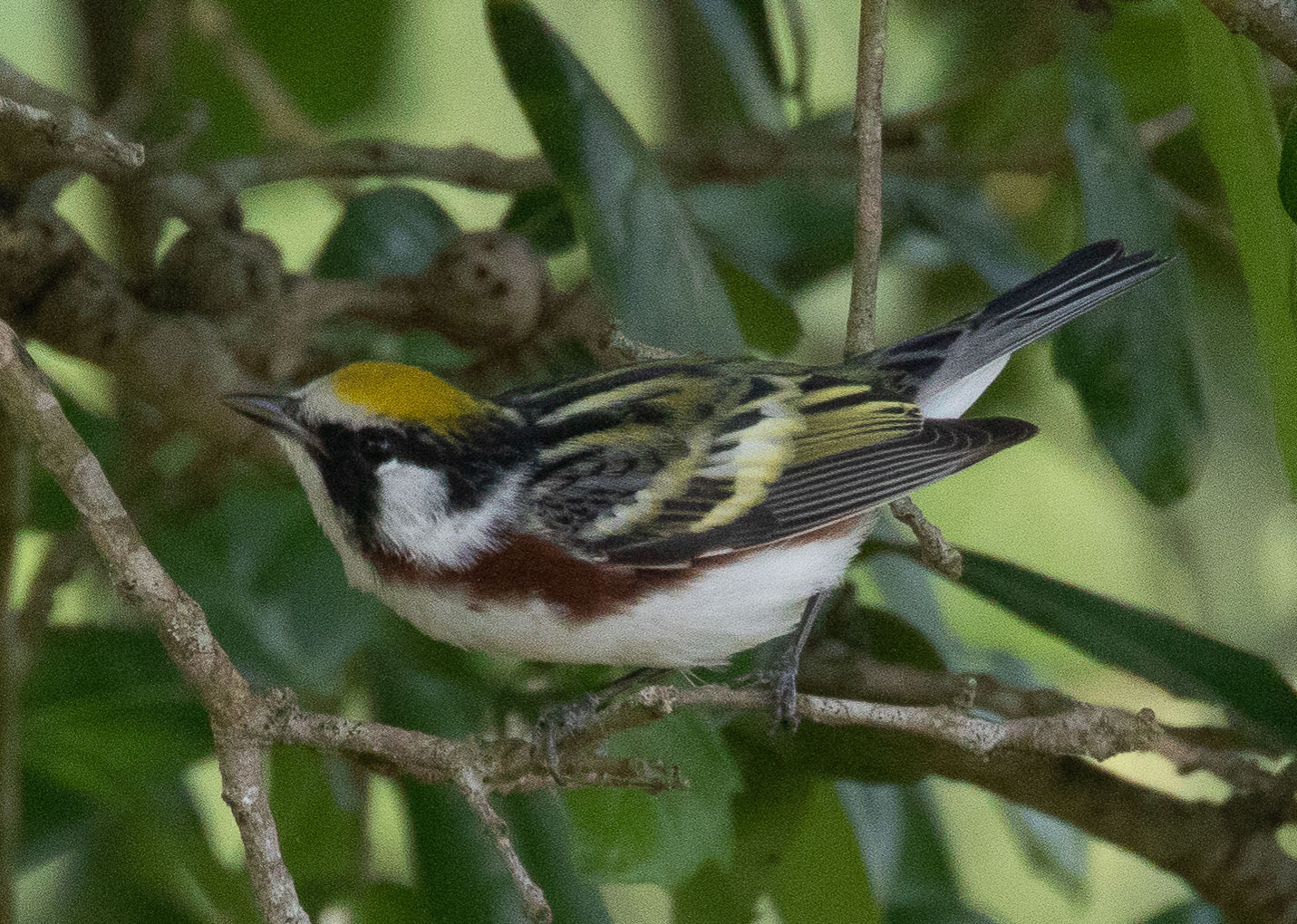
Chestnut-sided warbler (Setophaga pensylvanica) male

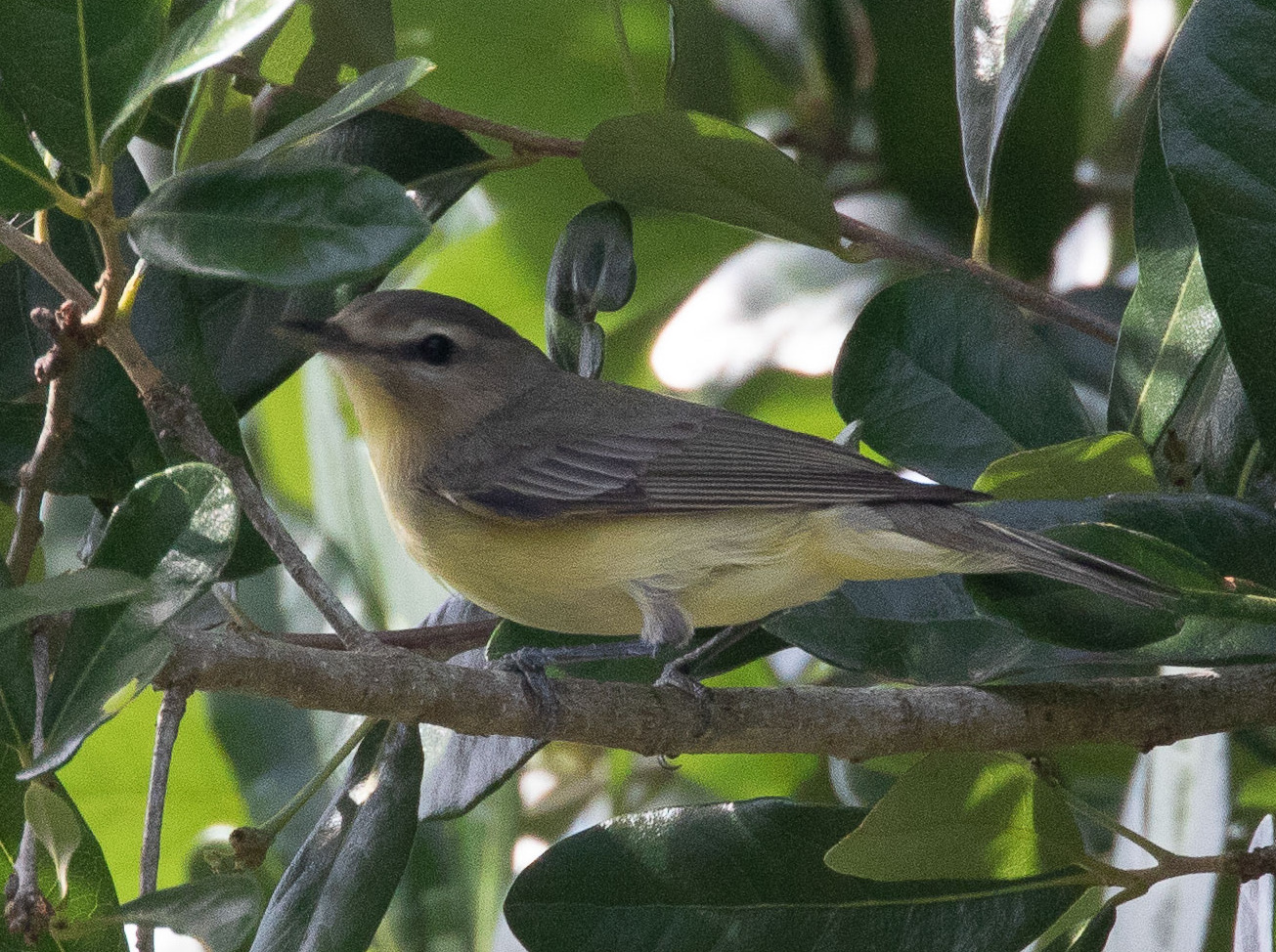
Philadelphia vireo (Vireo philadelphicus)

=== Reptiles ===
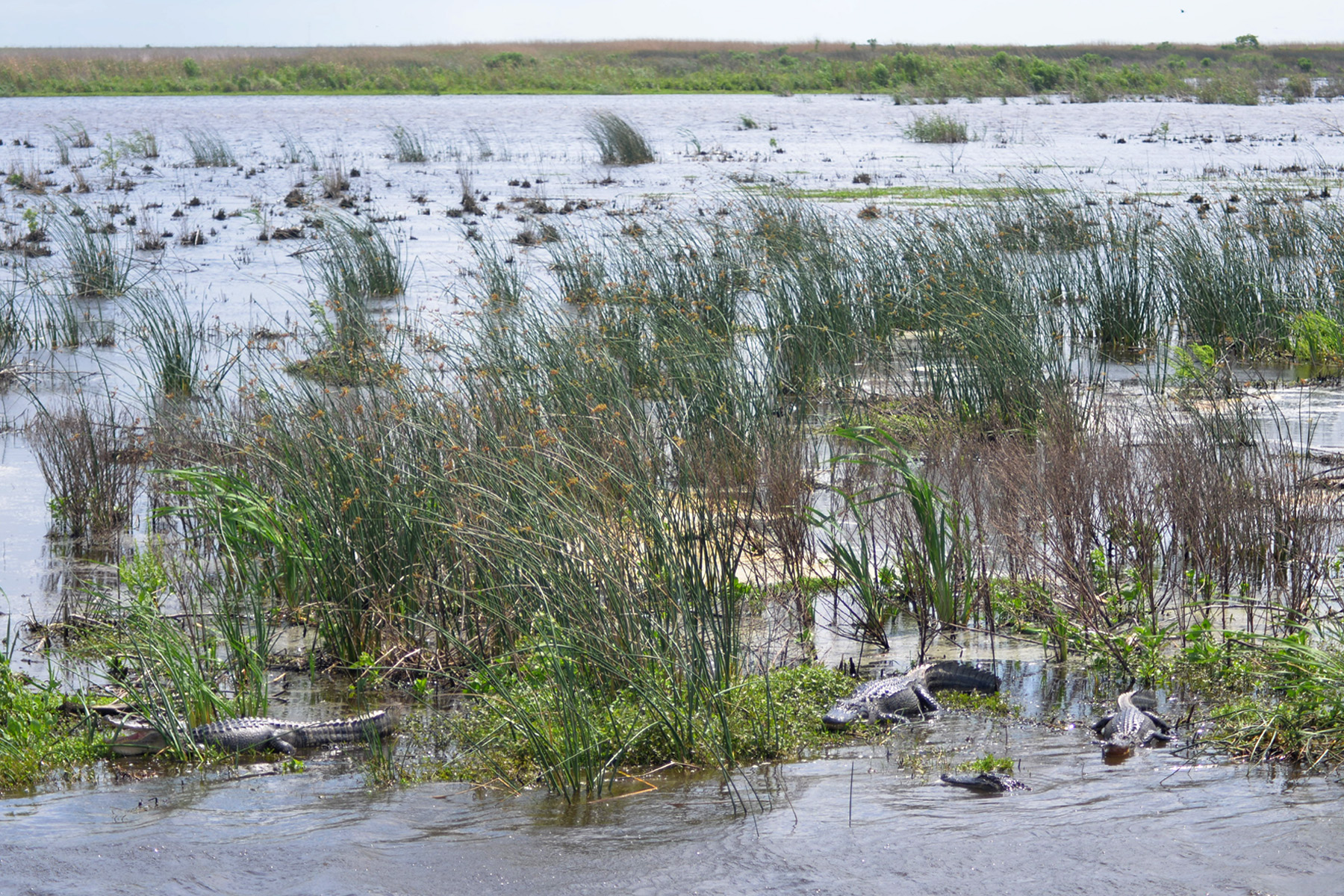
American alligators basking in Shoveler Pond, Jocelyn Nungaray NWR

Well over 45 species of reptiles have been recorded in Chambers County. Some of those are restricted to the forest in the north of the county and are not to be expected in the prairies and coastal marshes of the refuge. One of the most conspicuous and abundant is the American alligator (Alligator mississippiensis) which thrive in the marshlands and prairies of the upper Texas coast.

Pond turtles (Emydidae) include the red-eared slider (Trachemys scripta), and less commonly the chicken turtle (Deirochelys reticularia), river cooter (Pseudemys concinna), and the diamond-backed terrapin (Malaclemys terrapin) which is restricted to the brackish and saltwater marshes. Other turtles include the eastern snapping turtle (Chelydra serpentina), eastern mud turtle (Kinosternon subrubrum), spiny softshell turtle (Apalone spinifera), and three-toed box turtle (Terrapene triunguis). Although rare, sea turtles such as the loggerhead (Caretta caretta), Kemp’s Ridley (Lepidochelys kempii), and others occasionally appear on the gulf beaches. Lizards include the green anole (Anolis carolinensis), six-lined racerunner (Aspidoscelis sexlineatus), slender glass lizard (Ophisaurus attenuatus), and the invasive species the Mediterranean gecko (Hemidactylus turcicus).

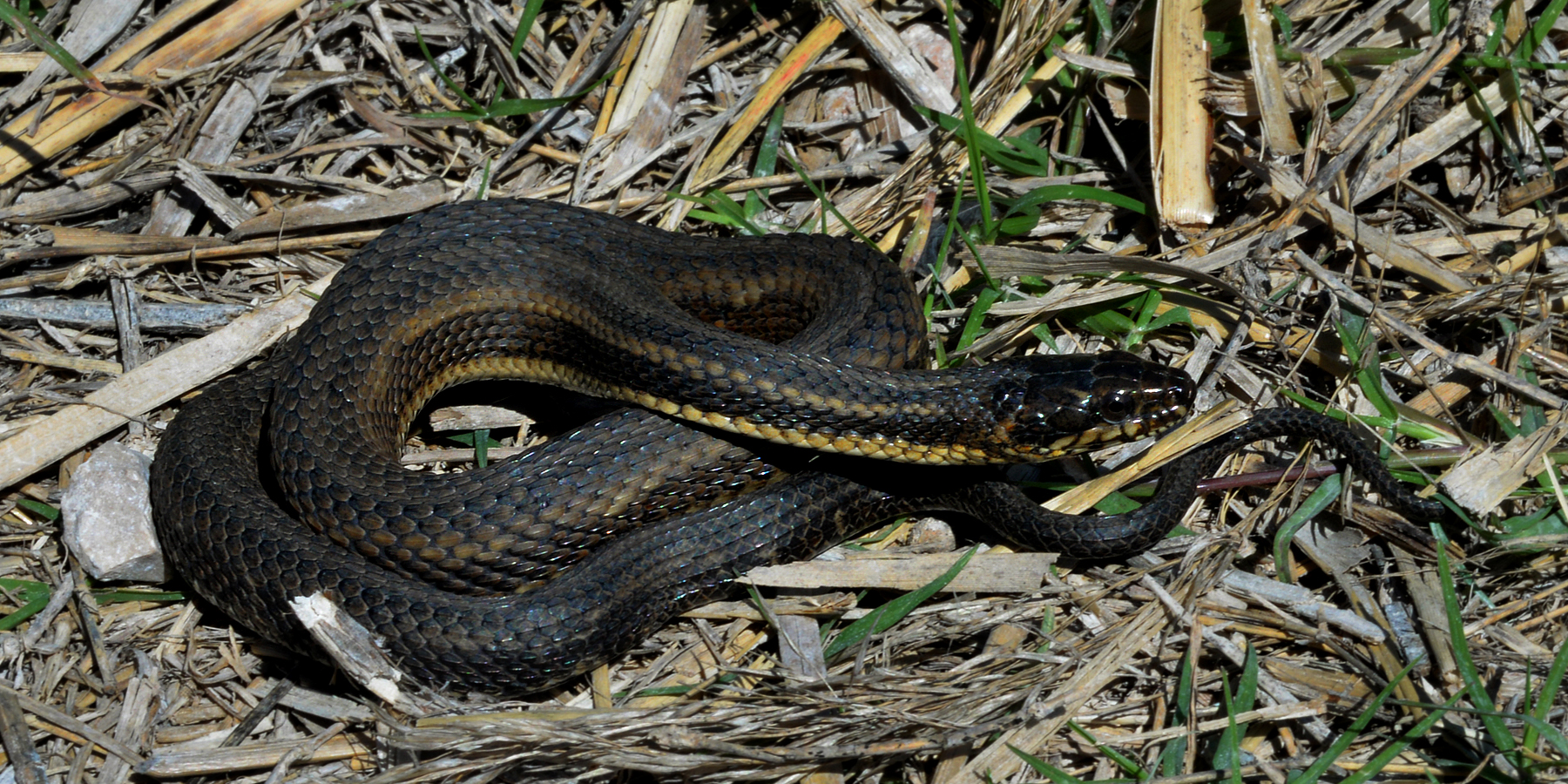
Saltmarsh watersnake, Jocelyn Nungaray NWR

Among the many species of nonvenomous snakes are the North American racer (Coluber constrictor), prairie kingsnake (Lampropeltis calligaster), speckled kingsnake (Lampropeltis holbrooki), rough greensnake (Opheodrys aestivus), western ratsnake (Pantherophis obsoletus), and western ribbonsnake (Thamnophis proximus). Many of the snakes in the region are aquatic or semi-aquatic species that are well adapted to the marshlands and bayous of the upper Texas coast, such as the red-bellied mudsnake (Farancia abacura), glossy swampsnake (Liodytes rigida), Graham’s crayfishsnake (Regina grahamii), saltmarsh watersnake (Nerodia clarkii), Mississippi green watersnake (Nerodia cyclopion), plain-bellied watersnake (Nerodia erythrogaster), broad banded watersnake (Nerodia fasciata), and diamond-backed watersnake (Nerodia rhombifer). Venomous snakes in the refuge include the Texas coralsnake (Micrurus tener) and northern cottonmouth (Agkistrodon piscivorus).

=== Amphibians ===
The presence of saline water limits amphibian diversity and yet, as of 2025, at least 18 species of amphibians have been documented in Chambers County. Among those are true frogs such as the southern crawfish frog (Lithobates areolatus), bronze frog (Lithobates clamitans), and southern leopard frog (Lithobates sphenocephalus). Among the Hylid frogs are the green treefrog (Hyla cinerea), squirrel treefrog (Hyla squirella), and the Cajun chorus frog (Pseudacris fouquettei). Other species include the gulf coast toad (Incilius nebulifer), Hurter's spadefoot (Scaphiopus hurterii), and the eastern narrow-mouthed toad (Gastrophryne carolinensis). The salamanders reported from Chambers County are the small-mouthed salamander (Ambystoma texanum), three-toed amphiuma (Amphiuma tridactylum), and eastern newt (Notophthalmus viridescens).

=== Fish ===
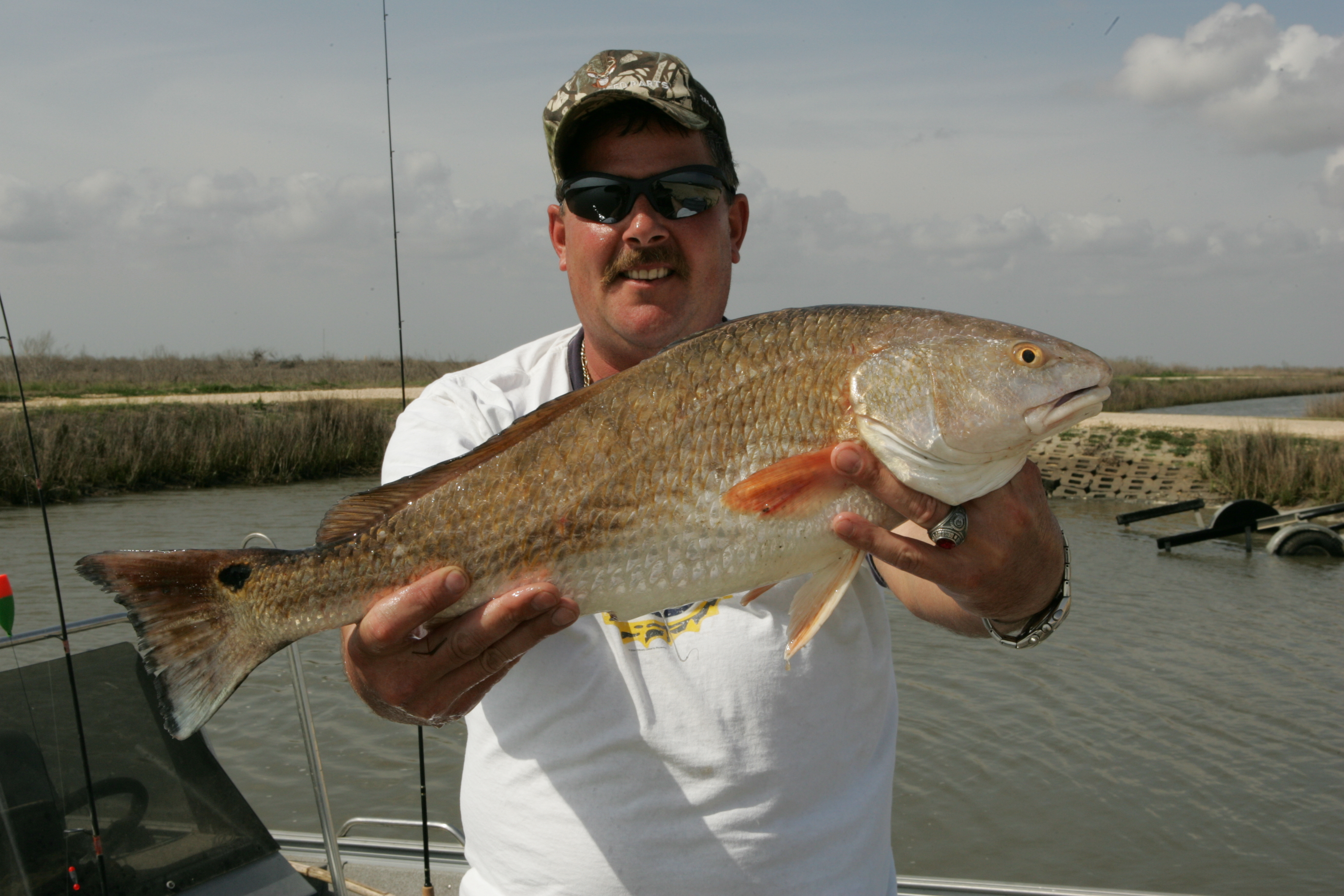
An angler at Jocelyn Nungaray NWR with a red drum (Sciaenops ocellatus)

The refuge protects areas of freshwater, brackish, and saltwater, as well as lentic and lotic environments, and a rich diversity of fish can be found there. Alligator gar (Atractosteus spatula), spotted gar (Lepisosteus oculatus), longnose gar (Lepisosteus osseus), bowfin (Amia calva), American eel (Anguilla rostrata), Atlantic stingray (Dasyatis sabina), and Atlantic needlefish (Strongylura marina) all occur in the waters. Other species include the gizzard shad (Dorosoma cepedianum), lake chubsucker (Erimyzon sucetta), bantam sunfish (Lepomis symmetricus), hogchoker (Trinectes maculatus), pigfish (Orthopristis chrysoptera), fat sleeper (Dormitator maculatus), and pinfish (Lagodon rhomboides).

Some of the game fish occurring in the refuge are the smallmouth buffalo (Ictiobus bubalus), striped mullet (Mugil cephalus), white bass (Morone chrysops), yellow bass (Morone mississippiensis), warmouth (Lepomis gulosus), longear sunfish (Lepomis megalotis), largemouth bass (Micropterus salmoides), and red drum (Sciaenops ocellatus). Catfish include the black bullhead (Ameiurus melas), yellow bullhead (Ameiurus natalis), channel (Ictalurus punctatus), and flathead catfish (Pylodictis olivaris).

Just a few species among the smaller fishes such as minnows and shiners are the threadfin shad (Dorosoma petenense), red shiner (Cyprinella lutrensis), emerald shiner (Notropis atherinoides), pugnose minnow (Opsopoeodus emiliae), bullhead minnow (Pimephales vigilax), inland silverside (Menidia beryllina), sheephead minnow (Cyprinodon variegatus), golden topminnow (Fundulus chrysotus), gulf killifish (Fundulus grandis), blackstripe topminnow (Fundulus notatus), bayou topminnow (Fundulus pulvereus), rainwater killifish (Lucania parva), least killifish (Heterandria formosa), sailfin molly (Poecilia latipinna), slough darter (Etheostoma gracile), naked goby (Gobiosoma bosc), gulf pipefish (Syngnathus scovelli), and bay anchovy (Anchoa mitchilli).

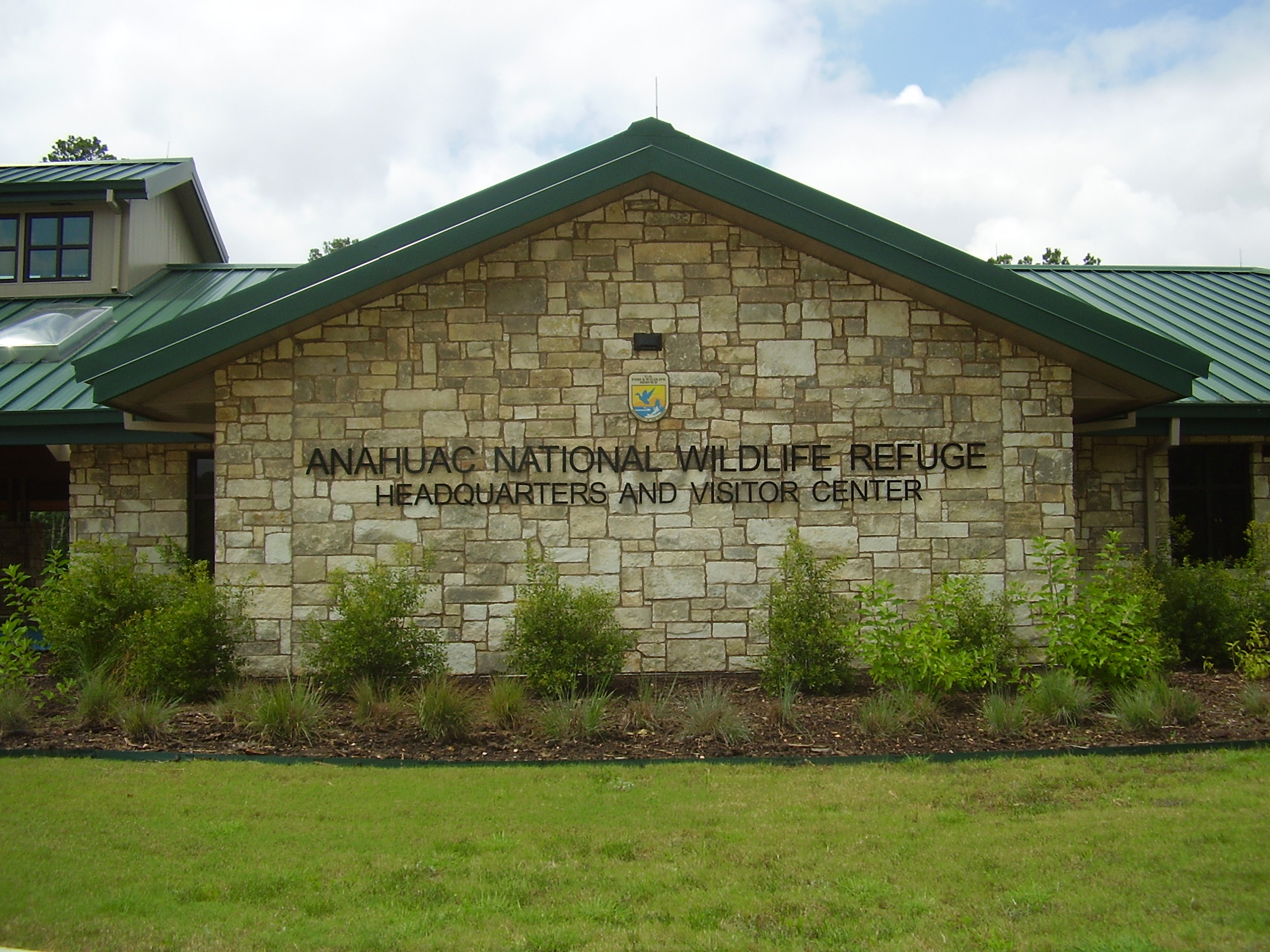
The Headquarters and Visitor’s Center, located 13 miles northwest of the refuge.

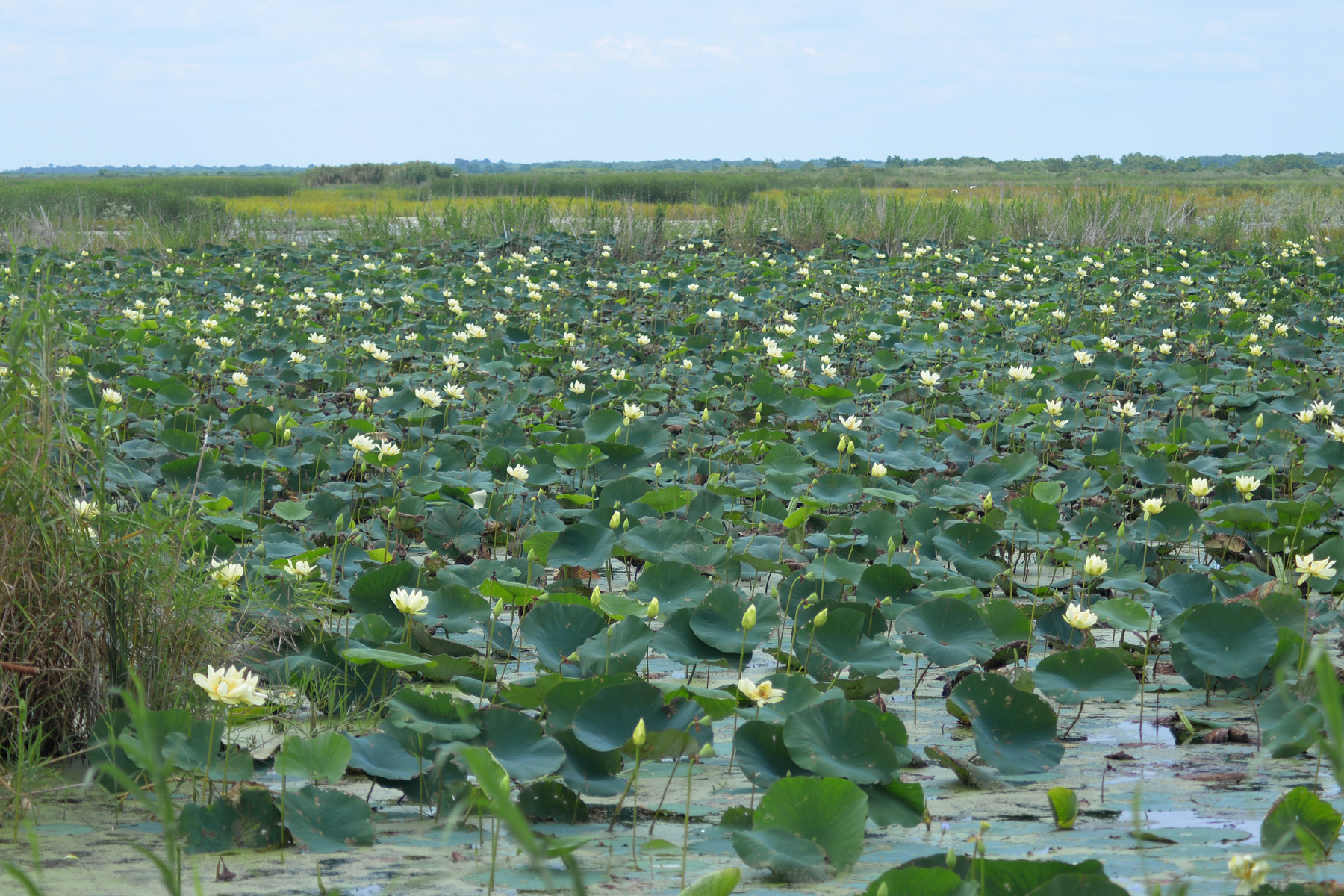
American Lotus (Nelumbo lutea) in Shoveler Pond, Jocelyn Nungaray NWR

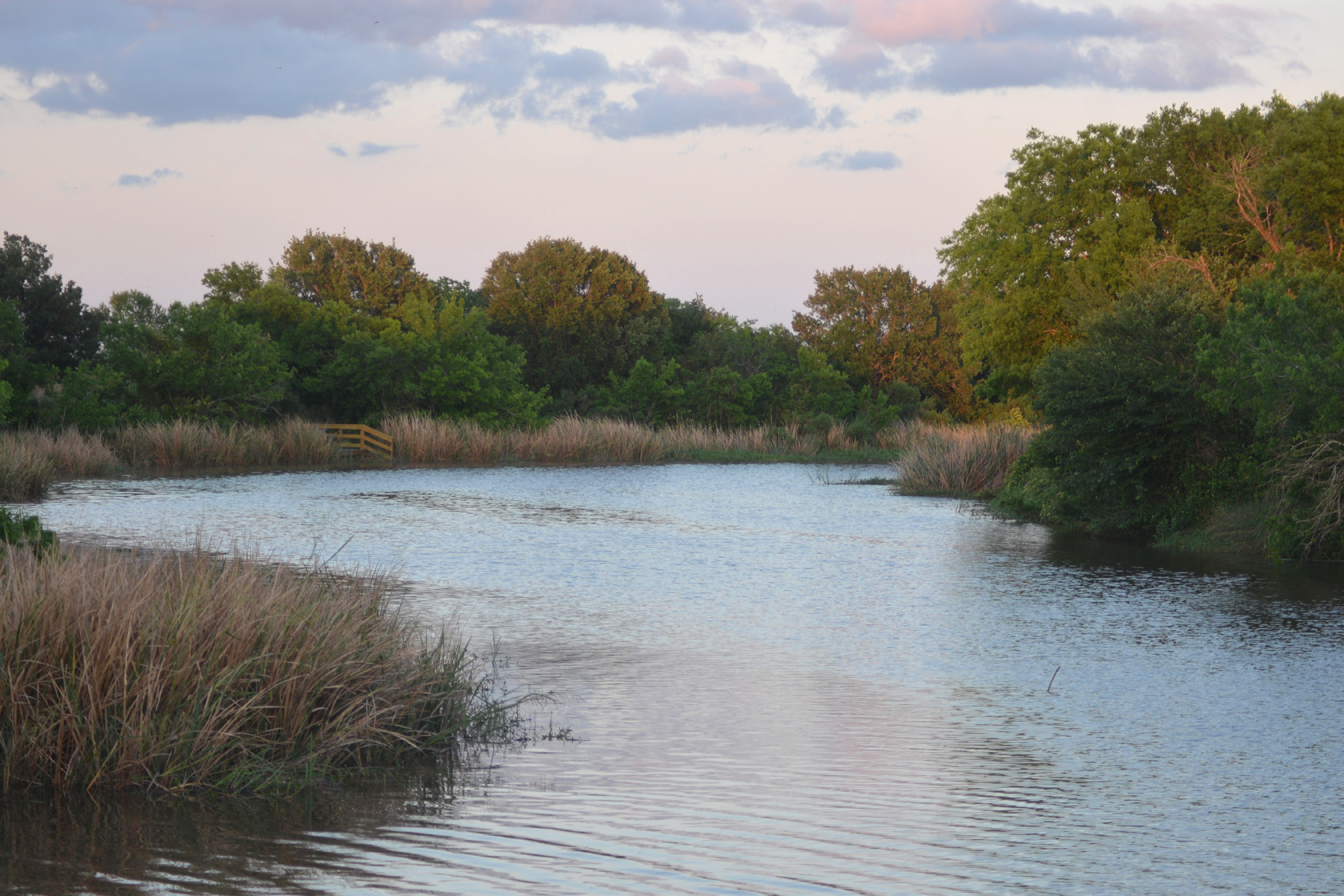
Live Oak Bayou, Skillern Tract, Jocelyn Nungaray NWR

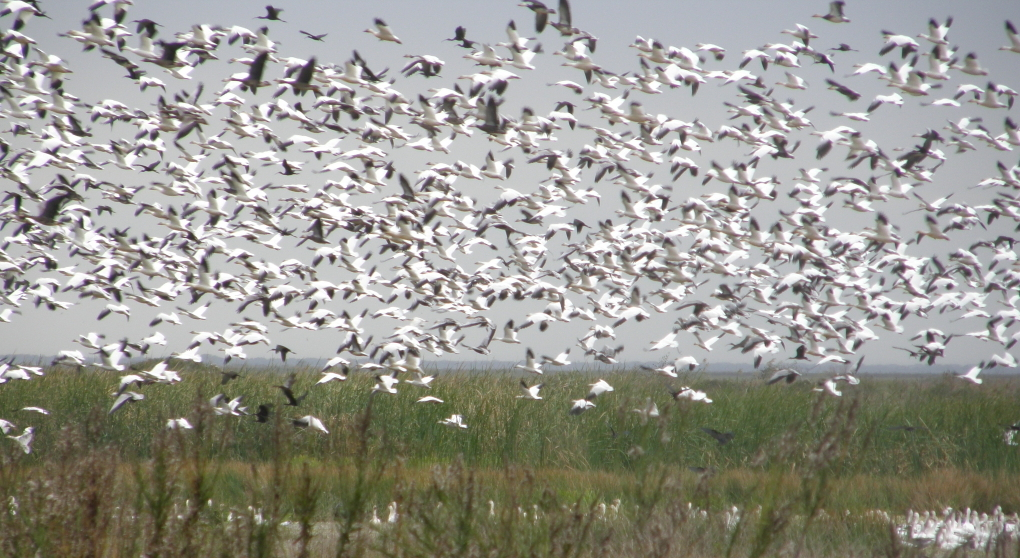
Snow geese (Anser caerulescens) flying in the refuge

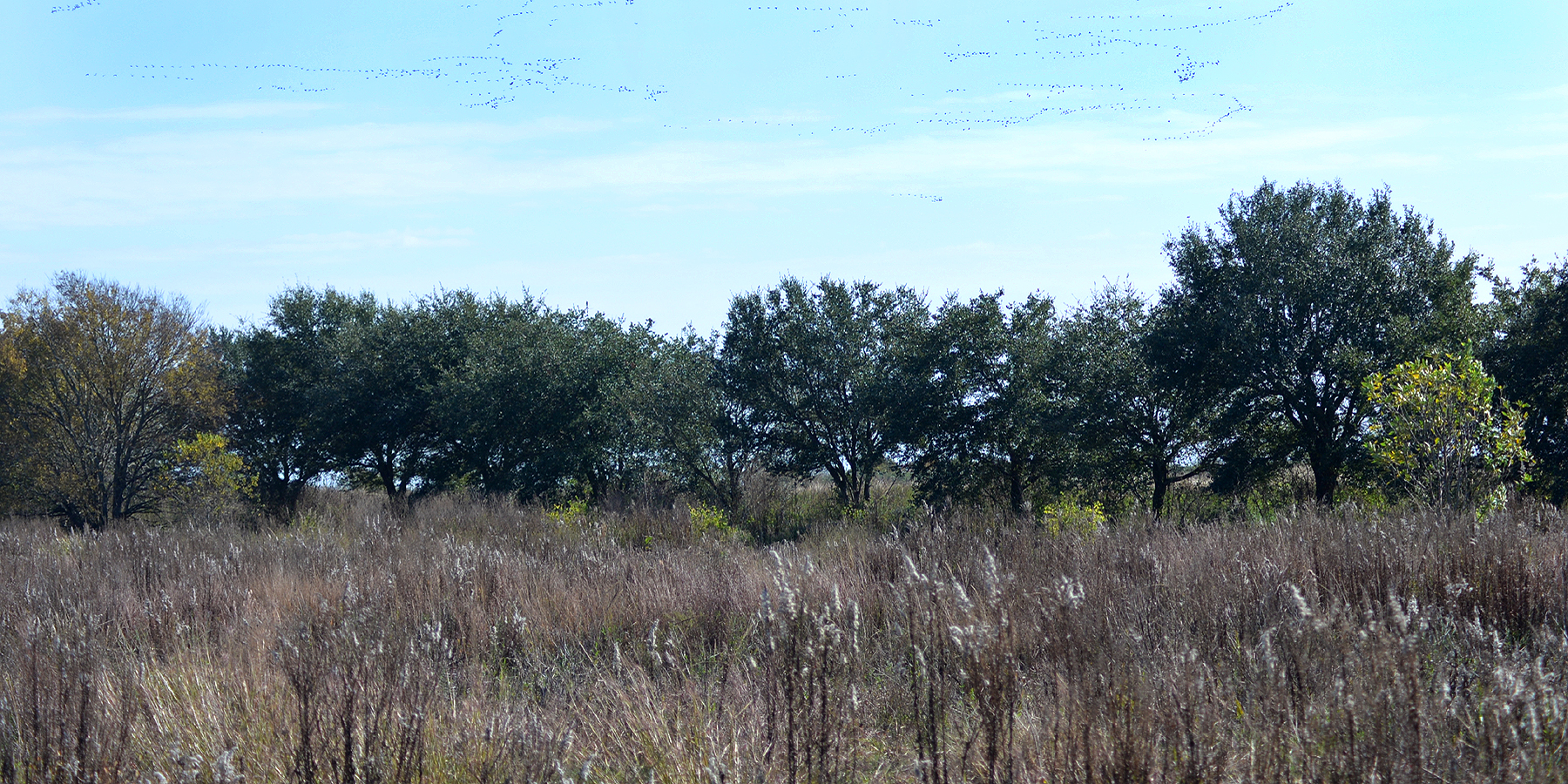
The refuge is in the Western Gulf coastal grasslands ecoregion

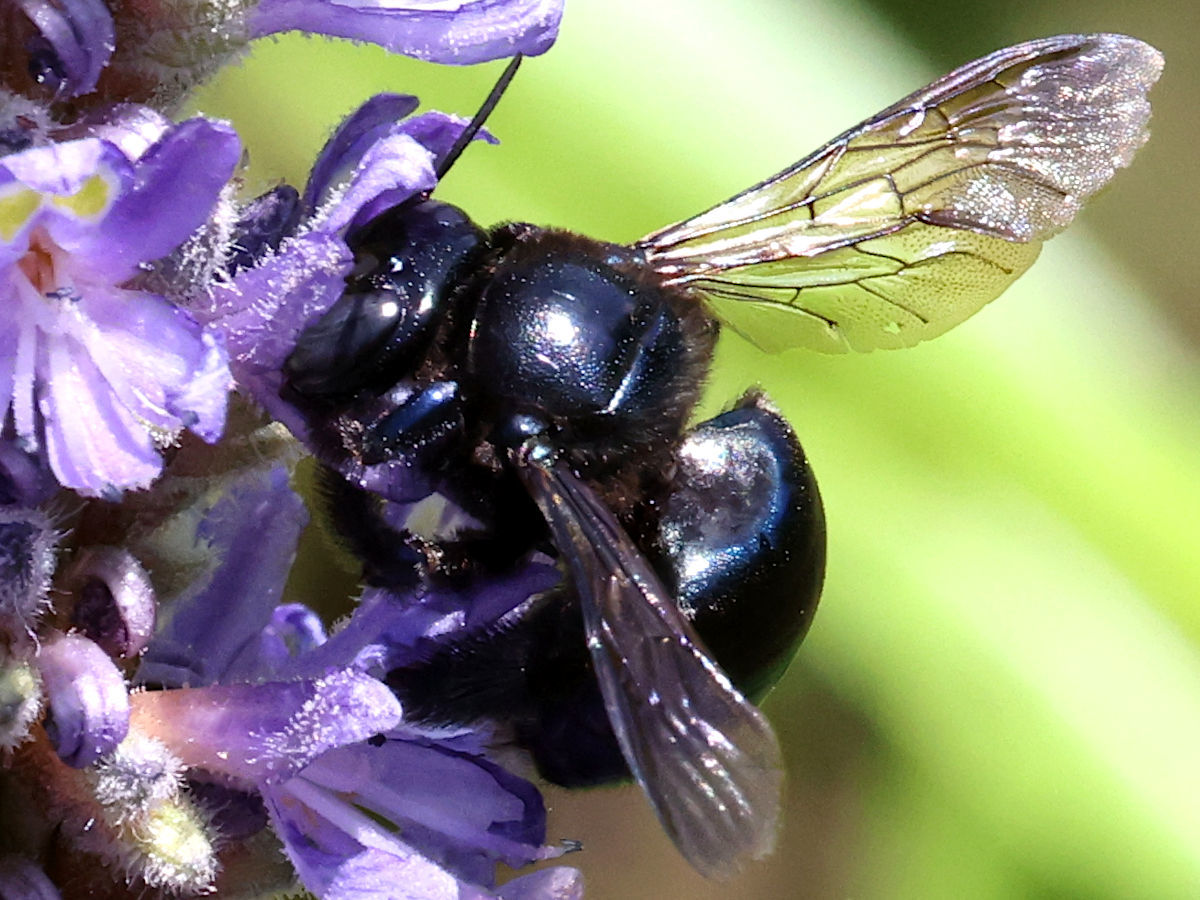
Southern carpenter bee, Jocelyn Nungaray NWR

== See also ==
- Wildlife refuge
