= Naked goby =

Naked goby is a common name for several fishes and may refer to:

- Croilia mossambica, a species of goby native to Mozambique and South Africa
- Gobiosoma bosc, a species of goby native to the east coast of North America
