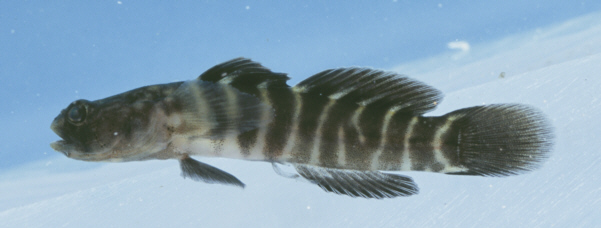
- Gobiosoma bosc

Scientific classification
- Kingdom: Animalia
- Phylum: Chordata
- Class: Actinopterygii
- Order: Gobiiformes
- Family: Gobiidae
- Subfamily: Gobiinae
- Genus: Gobiosoma; Girard, 1858

Type species
- Gobiosoma molestum, synonym of Gobiosoma bosc Girard, 1858

Synonyms
- Enypnias Jordan & Evermann, 1898; Garmannia Jordan & Evermann, 1895; Gerhardinus Meek & Hildebrand, 1928

= Gobiosoma =

Genus of fishes

Gobiosoma is a genus of gobies native to fresh, brackish and marine waters of the Americas.

== Species ==
Several additional species were formerly included in this Gobiosoma, but these have been moved to Elacatinus and Tigrigobius. There are currently 19 recognized species in Gobiosoma, but Gobiosoma pallida is a species inquirenda:

- Gobiosoma aceras (Ginsburg, 1939) (White-margined goby)
- Gobiosoma alfiei J. C. Joyeux & Macieira, 2015 (Alfie's goby)
- Gobiosoma bosc (Lacépède, 1800) (Naked goby)
- Gobiosoma chiquita (O. P. Jenkins & Evermann, 1889) (Sonora goby)
- Gobiosoma ginsburgi Hildebrand & Schroeder, 1928 (Seaboard goby)
- Gobiosoma grosvenori (C. R. Robins, 1964) (Rock-cut goby)
- Gobiosoma hemigymnum (C. H. Eigenmann & R. S. Eigenmann, 1888) (Half-naked goby)
- Gobiosoma hildebrandi (Ginsburg, 1939)
- Gobiosoma homochroma (Ginsburg, 1939)
- Gobiosoma longipala Ginsburg, 1933 (Two-scale goby)
- Gobiosoma nudum (Meek & Hildebrand, 1928) (Knob-chin goby)
- Gobiosoma pallida Herre, 1934
- Gobiosoma paradoxum (Günther, 1861) (Paradox goby)
- Gobiosoma robustum Ginsburg, 1933 (Code goby)
- Gobiosoma schultzi (Ginsburg, 1944)
- Gobiosoma seminudum (Günther, 1861) (Silt goby)
- Gobiosoma spes (Ginsburg, 1939) (Vermiculated goby)
- Gobiosoma spilotum (Ginsburg, 1939) (Isthmian goby)
- Gobiosoma yucatanum C. E. Dawson, 1971 (Yucatán goby)
