= Tigrigobius nesiotes =

Conservation status
- Least Concern (IUCN 3.1)

Scientific classification
- Kingdom: Animalia
- Phylum: Chordata
- Class: Actinopterygii
- Order: Gobiiformes
- Family: Gobiidae
- Genus: Tigrigobius
- Species: T. nesiotes

Binomial name
- Tigrigobius nesiotes W. A. Bussing, 1990

Synonyms
- Elacatinus nesiotes W. A. Bussing, 1990

Species of fish

Tigrigobius nesiotes is a species of goby native to the eastern Pacific islands of the Galapagos, Cocos Island and Gorgona Island dwelling deep in rock crevices. This species is a cleaner fish notably cleaning Whitetip reef sharks (Triaenodon obesus) who will wait in substantial numbers for service. This species grows to a length of 2.3 centimetres (0.91 in) SL.
