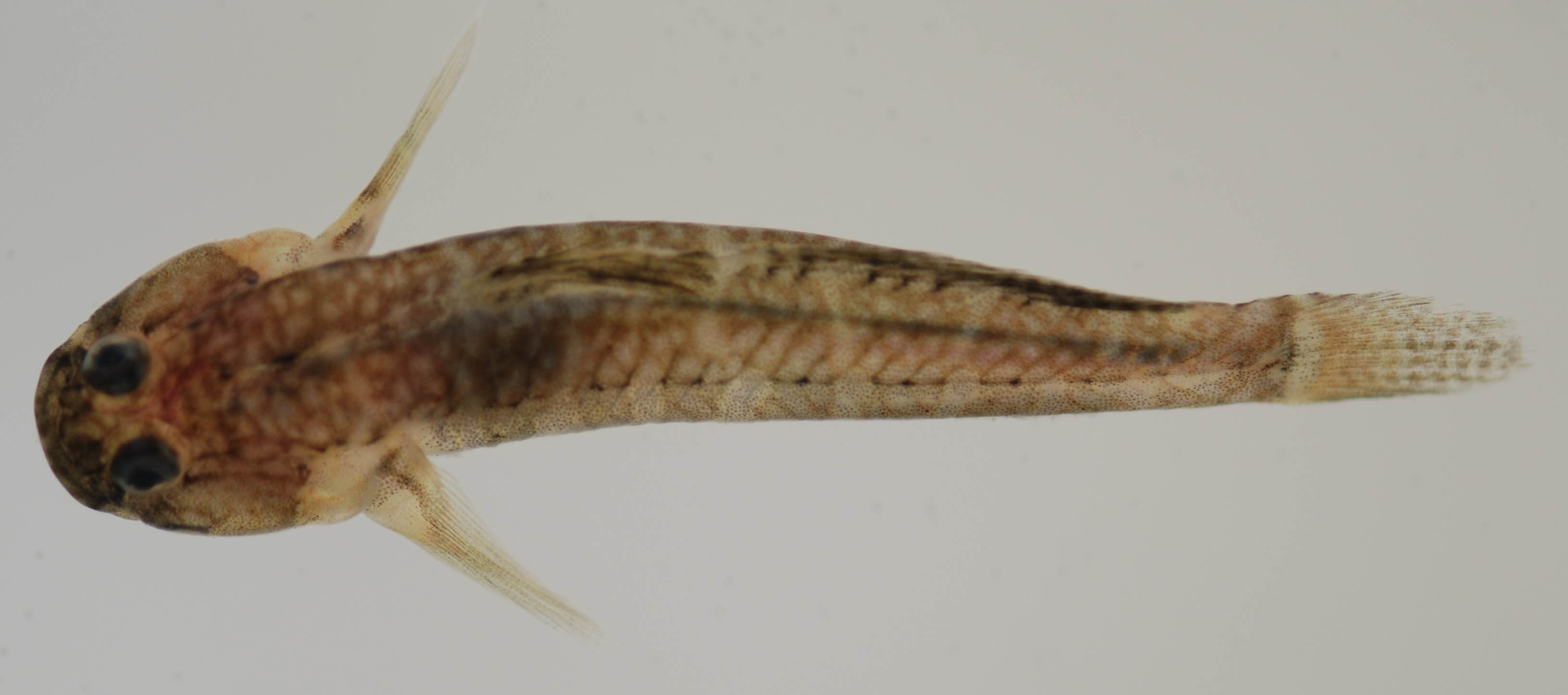

Conservation status
- Least Concern (IUCN 3.1)

Scientific classification
- Kingdom: Animalia
- Phylum: Chordata
- Class: Actinopterygii
- Order: Gobiiformes
- Family: Gobiidae
- Genus: Gobiosoma
- Species: G. ginsburgi

Binomial name
- Gobiosoma ginsburgi Hildebrand & Schroeder, 1928

= Gobiosoma ginsburgi =

Species of fish

The seaboard goby (Gobiosoma ginsburgi) is a species of fish belonging to the family Gobiidae.

== Description ==
The seaboard goby has a long pelvic disk that reaches most of the distance of the pelvic fin to the ventral fin. It has 12 dorsal rays modally. It can be colored from a pale, translucent shade to a darker brown.

== Distribution and habitat ==
The seaboard goby occurs on the Atlantic Coast of the United States, ranging north from Massachusetts to Georgia, being recorded most frequently from New Jersey to the southern end of its range. Although it has been recorded to be found up to depths of 45m, it is more commonly found in the depth range of 2–9 m deep.

== Reproduction and development ==
Spawning for the seaboard goby occurs during the summer season beginning at age 1 in the southern portions of its range, and progressively continues northward as the season goes on. Eggs and hatching size have not been observed.

== Name ==
The specific name honors the American ichthyologist and taxonomist of gobies, Isaac Ginsburg (1886–1975), who was a colleague of Hildebrand and Schroeder at the U.S. National Museum.
