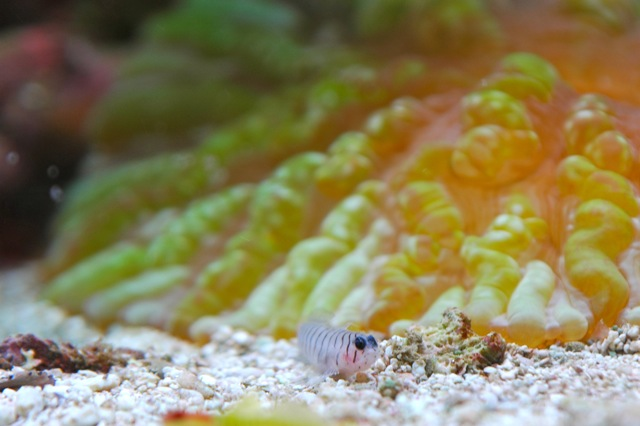
- Tigrigobius macrodon

Scientific classification
- Kingdom: Animalia
- Phylum: Chordata
- Class: Actinopterygii
- Order: Gobiiformes
- Family: Gobiidae
- Genus: Tigrigobius; Fowler, 1931

Type species
- Gobiosoma macrodon Beebe & Tee-Van 1928

= Tigrigobius =

Genus of fishes

Tigrigobius is a genus of small, often strikingly colored gobies native to warmer parts of the east Pacific and west Atlantic, including the Gulf of California and Caribbean. They were formerly included in Gobiosoma. Some species of Tigrigobius are known to act as cleaners.

== Species ==
There are currently 14 recognized species in this genus:

- Tigrigobius digueti Pellegrin, 1901 (Banded cleaner goby)
- Tigrigobius dilepis C. R. Robins & J. E. Böhlke, 1964 (Orangesided goby)
- Tigrigobius gemmatum Ginsburg, 1939 (Frecklefin goby)
- Tigrigobius harveyi Victor, 2014 (Cayman greenbanded goby)
- Tigrigobius janssi W. A. Bussing, 1981 (Spotback goby)
- Tigrigobius limbaughi Hoese & Reader, 2001 (Widebanded cleaning goby)
- Tigrigobius macrodon Beebe & Tee-Van, 1928 (Tiger goby)
- Tigrigobius multifasciatus Steindachner, 1876 (Greenbanded goby)
- Tigrigobius nesiotes W. A. Bussing, 1990
- Tigrigobius pallens Ginsburg, 1939 (Semiscaled goby)
- Tigrigobius panamensis Victor, 2010 (Panamanian greenbanded goby)
- Tigrigobius rubrigenis Victor, 2010 (Redcheek goby)
- Tigrigobius saucrum C. R. Robins, 1960 (Leopard goby)
- Tigrigobius zebrella C. R. Robins, 1958 (Zebrette goby)
