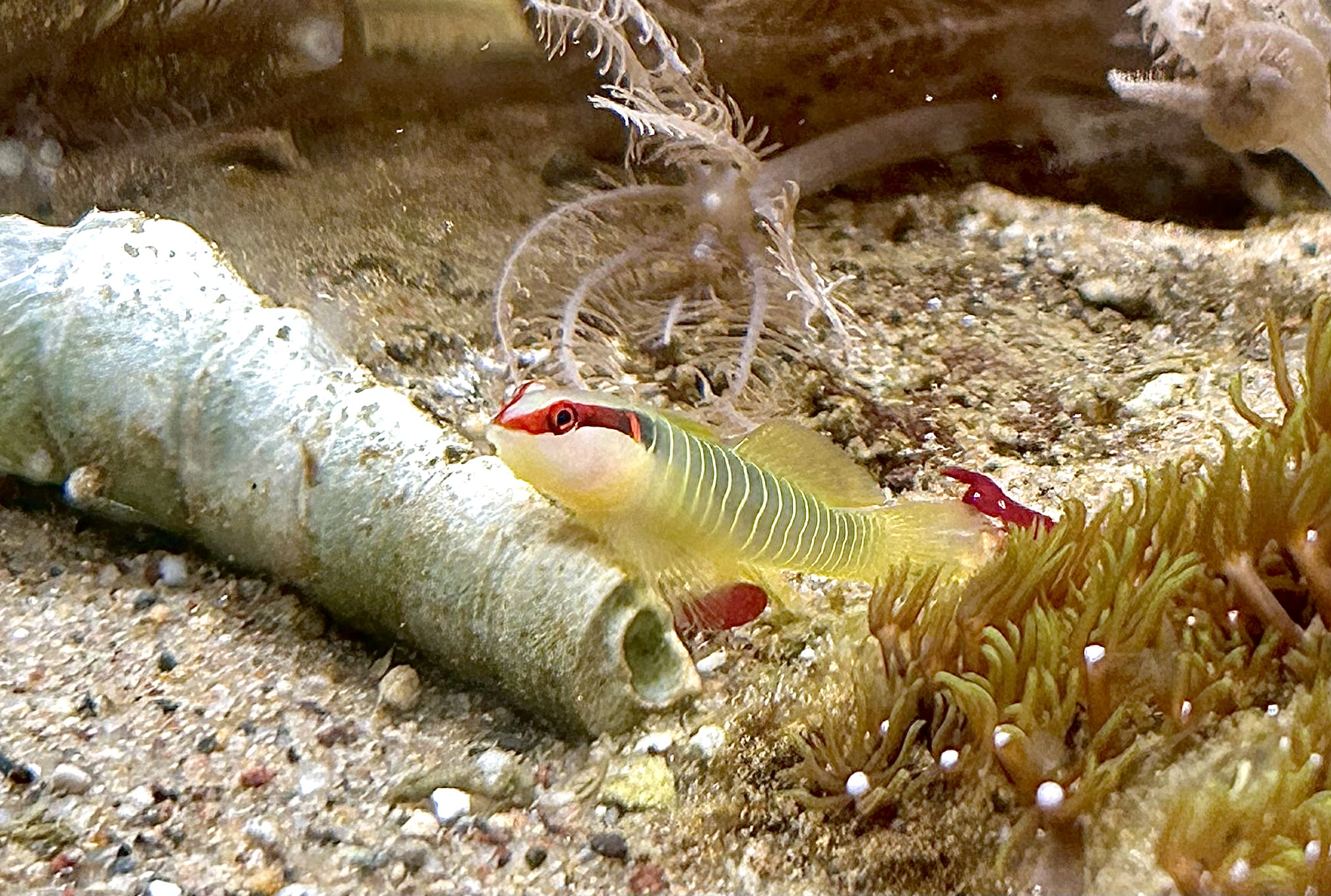

Conservation status
- Least Concern (IUCN 3.1)

Scientific classification
- Kingdom: Animalia
- Phylum: Chordata
- Class: Actinopterygii
- Order: Gobiiformes
- Family: Gobiidae
- Genus: Tigrigobius
- Species: T. multifasciatus

Binomial name
- Tigrigobius multifasciatus (Steindachner, 1876)

Synonyms
- Gobiosoma multifasciatus Steindachner, 1876; Elacatinus multifasciatus (Steindachner, 1876)

= Tigrigobius multifasciatus =

Species of fish

Tigrigobius multifasciatus, the green banded goby, is a member of the goby family native to the western Atlantic Ocean, from the Bahamas and Central America to northern South America. As the name implies, they are dark green with 17-23 pale green bars, and have a brown stripe through the eye interrupted with a bright red spot. It is believed by many that these markings imitate the Juvenile Schoolmaster Snapper.

Equally bright as their coloration is their personality; they are valued additions to reef aquaria, with a reputation for being friendly and entertaining.

== Description ==
Tigriogobius multifasciatus have a generally fusiform shape. At maturity they can reach a length of 3.5 cm.

== In the aquarium ==
The green banded goby is popular with aquarists and is generally considered to be reef safe. It is especially suited to nano reef tanks because of its small size.

Because of territorial issues with their own kind in the small confines of a tank, they are best kept singly or as a breeding pair.

== Conservation status ==
Tigrigobius multifasciatus is not found on the IUCN Red List. The species is highly resilient, with localized populations able to double within fifteen months.

== Reproduction ==
Gobiodon sp. start life as females, and are bi-directional protogynous hermaphrodites, meaning that when paired up, if necessary, one changes sex to form a breeding pair. In the case of two females forming a pair, the larger of the two becomes male, and in the case of two males, the smaller changes sex to become female.
