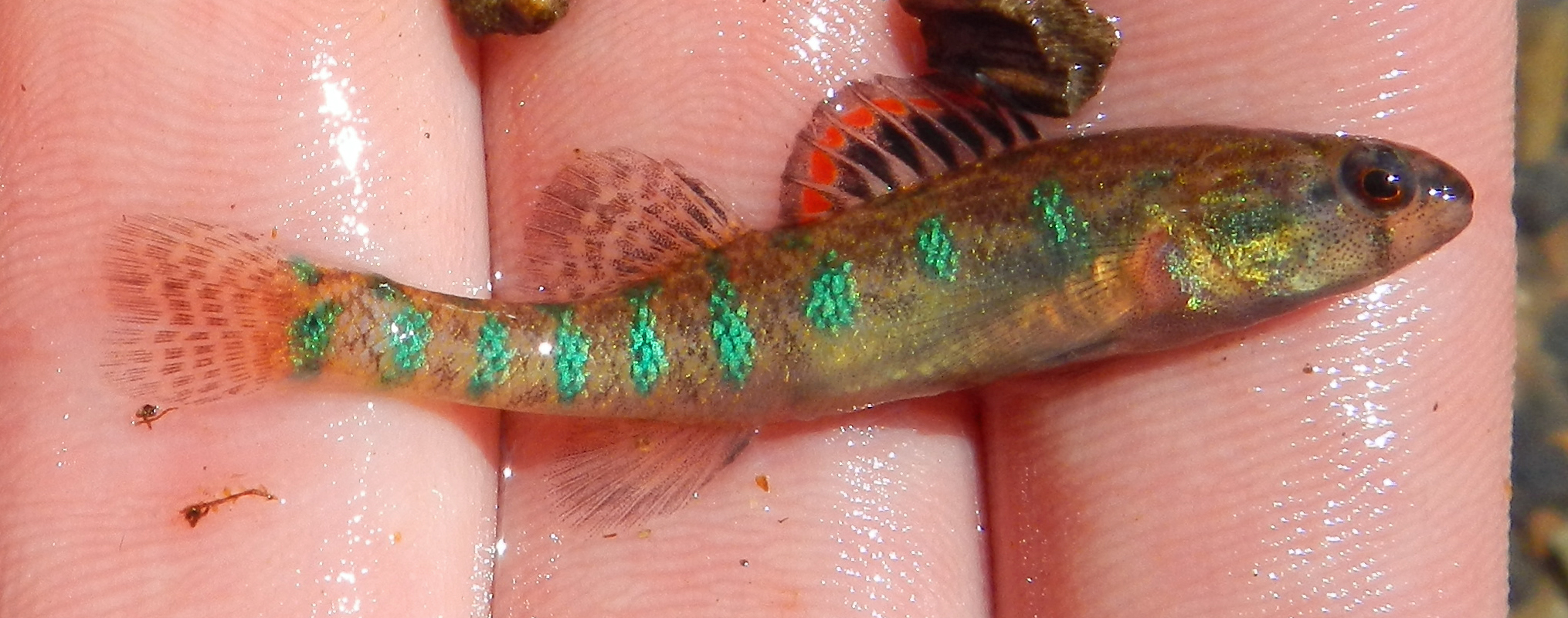
- Adult male Etheostoma gracile

Conservation status
- Least Concern (IUCN 3.1)

Scientific classification
- Kingdom: Animalia
- Phylum: Chordata
- Class: Actinopterygii
- Order: Perciformes
- Family: Percidae
- Genus: Etheostoma
- Species: E. gracile

Binomial name
- Etheostoma gracile (Girard, 1859)

Synonyms
- Boleosoma gracile Girard, 1859

= Etheostoma gracile =

Slough darter

Species of fish

Etheostoma gracile, the slough darter, is a small species of ray-finned fish, a darter from the subfamily Etheostomatinae, part of the family Percidae which includes the perches, ruffs and pike-perches. It inhabits slow to moderately flowing waters and with substrates that are predominantly mud, silt, or sand. Major food sources include chironomids, copepods, and cladocerans, as well as mayflies in the spring. Adults reach 35 to 50 mm (1.4 to 2.0 in) total length. It is one of the 324 species of fish found in Tennessee.

At the southern end of its range in Texas, the slough darter breeds from January to March, while at the northern end of its range in Illinois, it breeds in May and June. The eggs are attached to submerged vegetation, leaves, or twigs, and the adults do not guard them as some other members of this family do.

== Distribution and habitat ==
Etheostoma gracile is found in the Mississippi River basin from central Illinois and northeastern Missouri to Louisiana, also in the Red River drainages to southeastern Kansas and eastern Oklahoma, and the Gulf Slope drainages from the Tombigbee River in Mississippi to the Nueces River in Texas. Suitable habitats include pools of slow-flowing water in small streams, backwaters of larger rivers, turbid water over sand or mud, oxbow lakes, swamps, and among vegetation.

== Status ==
The IUCN has listed this species as being of "Least Concern", because it has an extensive range in the Mississippi River system, has a large total population size, and numerous subpopulations. In general, the population trend seems stable and no major threats have been identified.
