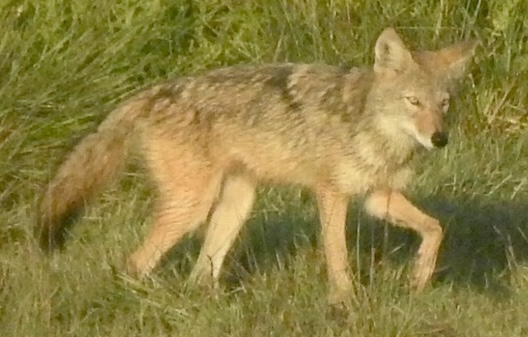

Scientific classification
- Kingdom: Animalia
- Phylum: Chordata
- Class: Mammalia
- Order: Carnivora
- Family: Canidae
- Genus: Canis
- Species: C. latrans
- Population: Galveston Island coyote

= Galveston Island coyote =

Galveston Island coyote Temporal range: Late Holocene – present

North American wild canine hybrid

The Galveston Island coyote, informally nicknamed the ghost wolf, is a wild North American canine hybrid that is native to Galveston Island, Texas. They have ancestry from red wolves, southeastern coyotes, Mexican wolves, domestic dogs, and Texas gray wolves.

== Taxonomy ==
The coyotes are an example of hybridization, where genetic admixture from one species gradually integrates into the population of another. The red wolf, while classified as a distinct species, Canis rufus, is potentially a hybrid of the gray wolf (Canis lupus), and coyote (Canis latrans).

One study showed that on average, the coyotes derive 13% of their ancestry from red wolves, with two individuals deriving 50% of their ancestry from red wolves. The same study revealed that many individuals also have varying amounts of ancestry from southeastern coyotes, Mexican wolves, Texas gray wolves, and domestic dogs.

It is not known whether the coyotes constitute an instance of hybrid speciation, where genetic admixture results in enough distinguishing traits to be defined as a distinct species. Regardless, the Gulf Coast Canine Project - a conservation organization, has suggested a potential binomial name of "Canis spiritus" (lit. 'spirit dog'). Because the population does not meet the criteria of the International Code of Zoological Nomenclature for a binomial name, this suggestion is not used in any formal context.

== History ==
In 2008, photographer Ron Wooten began investigating the coyotes in his native Galveston Island following an attack on his dog, who succumbed to injuries. Initially, Wooten assumed the coyote population were coydogs, as he believed the canids looked like Great Danes. He sent DNA samples from roadkill coyotes to scientists, who compared the samples to related canid species.

Historically, red wolves ranged throughout the southeastern United States, but disease, habitat destruction, and predator-control programs ultimately led the red wolf to become nearly extinct. Several of the remaining populations hybridized with coyotes, whose descendants are now often found in the red wolf's former range. The majority of remaining red wolves are in the care of the United States Fish and Wildlife Service's SAFE captive breeding program.

In 2025, the Dallas-based Colossal Biosciences created four clones of the Galveston Island coyotes as a part of their effort to rehabilitate the population of captive red wolves by introducing the genetic diversity of the coyotes into the population to counter the effects of inbreeding.

== Description ==
The coyotes have longer legs and more reddish fur than mainland coyotes, traits which are inherited from red wolves. Galveston Island coyotes' weight ranges from 20 to 50 pounds (9.1 to 22.7 kg). On average, Galveston Island coyotes weigh 35 pounds (16 kg), which is intermediate between coyotes (33 pounds; 15 kg) and red wolves (50 pounds; 23 kgs).

It is estimated that there is between 55 and 100 coyotes on the island, who are divided into four family groups based on their location: East End Lagoon Nature Preserve, Galveston Island State Park, Scholes International Airport, and Middle Island.

== See also ==
- Coydog
- Coywolf
- Eastern coyote
- Great Lakes-boreal wolf
