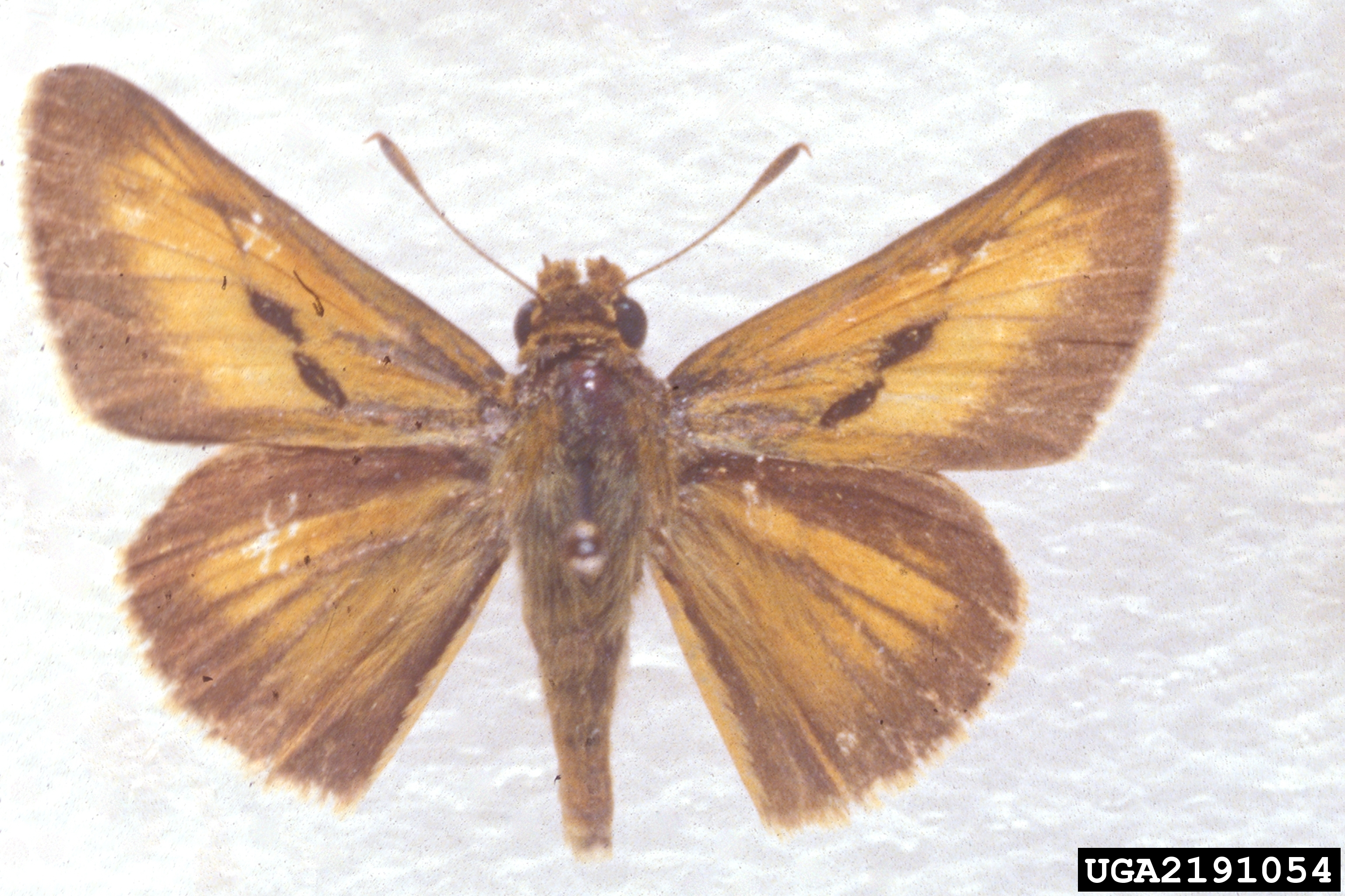
- Male
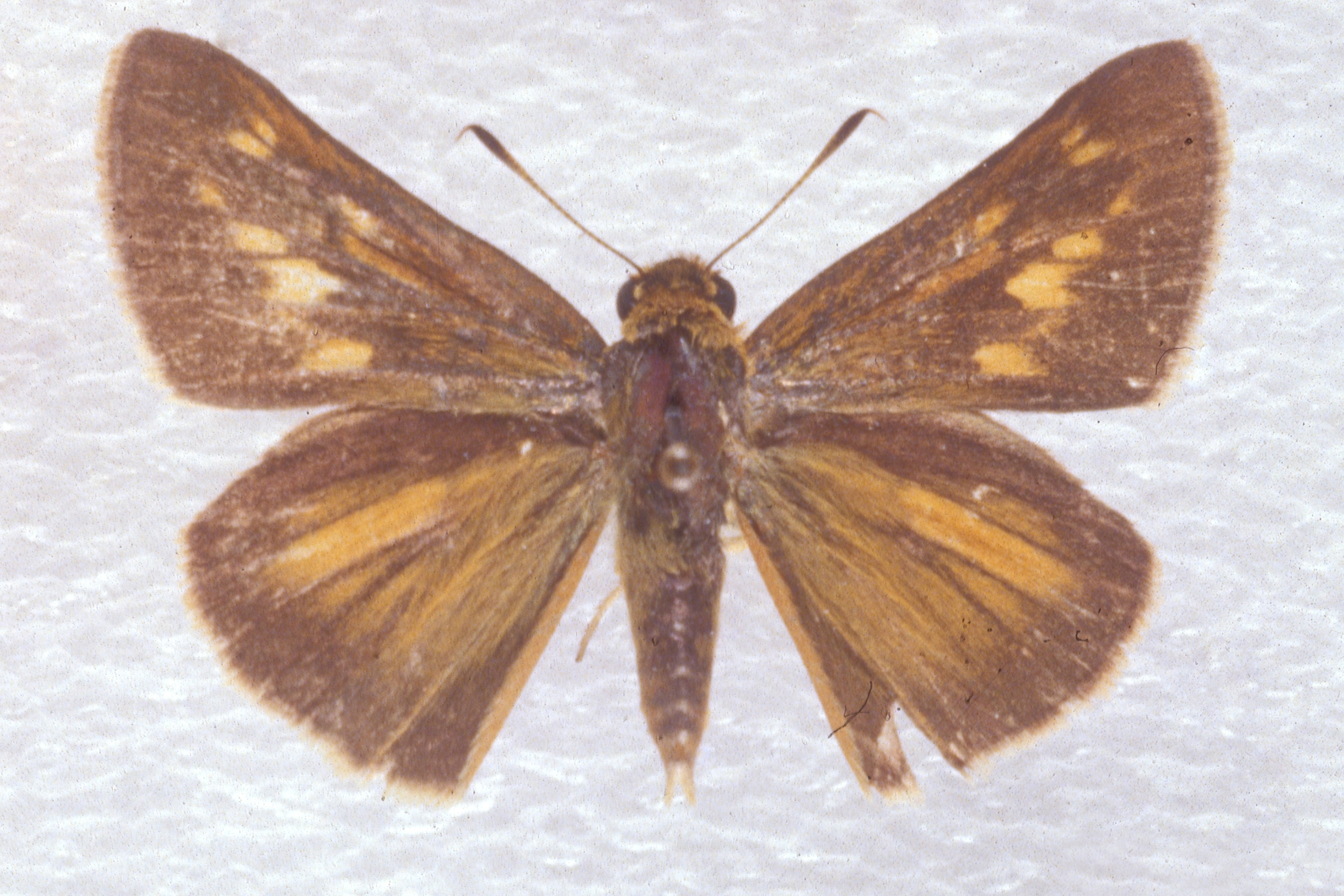
- Female

Conservation status
- Imperiled (NatureServe)

Scientific classification
- Kingdom: Animalia
- Phylum: Arthropoda
- Class: Insecta
- Order: Lepidoptera
- Family: Hesperiidae
- Genus: Euphyes
- Species: E. bayensis

Binomial name
- Euphyes bayensis Shuey, 1989

= Euphyes bayensis =

Species of butterfly

Euphyes bayensis, commonly known as the bay skipper, is a butterfly belonging to the Hesperiidae family. It is found in coastal Mississippi within the United States, Louisiana and Texas, where it lives in sawgrass marshes of the tidal zone.

The wingspan is 37–44 mm. Adults feed on flower nectar. Within its range there are two generations, in late May and in September. The bay skipper may be confused with Euphyes dion.

== Conservation ==
Euphyes bayensis is considered to be globally imperiled by NatureServe. Threats to the species include major hurricanes, human activity causing wetland loss and possibly the use of insecticides and burning of sawgrass.
