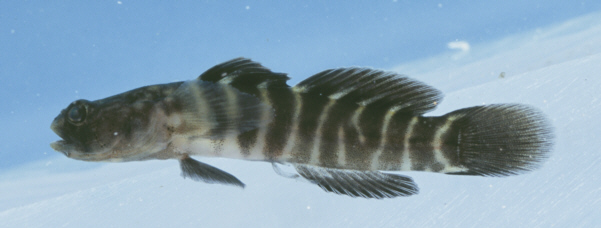

Conservation status
- Least Concern (IUCN 3.1)

Scientific classification
- Kingdom: Animalia
- Phylum: Chordata
- Class: Actinopterygii
- Division: Teleostei
- Order: Gobiiformes
- Family: Gobiidae
- Genus: Gobiosoma
- Species: G. bosc

Binomial name
- Gobiosoma bosc (Lacépède, 1800)

Synonyms
- Gobius bosc Lacepède, 1800; Gobiosoma molestum Girard, 1858; Gobiosoma bosci (Lacepède, 1800)

= Gobiosoma bosc =

Species of fish

Gobiosoma bosc (naked goby) is a fish named for its lack of scales. This is a true goby; it is part of the genus Gobiosoma.

== Description ==
The naked goby is usually less than two inches in length and lacks scales. The pelvic fins of the naked goby are linked together by a membrane, fitting the purpose of a sucker-like disk. The fin also reaches a point between the base and the anus. It ranges in color from a pale yellow to a murky brown, and is variably marked along its body with nine to ten vertical bars, which may not be visible in individuals with very light or dark body coloration.

== Distribution and habitat ==
Generally, naked gobies live in estuaries and coastal waters. It is noted that naked gobies may bury themselves in bottom sediments in the winter. The naked goby is found in the Western Atlantic from Connecticut to Mexico. It lives almost exclusively in habitats with brackish water. Younger members of the species are commonly found in estuaries south of New Jersey and only sporadically in estuaries north of New Jersey.

== Reproduction ==
They tend to reproduce from May to November. They are oviparous, meaning that they lay eggs. The females are known to lay their eggs in empty oyster shells. It is then up to the males to guard the eggs until they hatch. After they hatch, the free swimming larvae may migrate upstream and school over oyster reefs before settling.

The lifespan of this fish is approximately 4 years.

== Feeding ==
With a terminal mouth and being bottom dwelling fish they are known to eat worms and small crustaceans. However, it has been seen that they are attracted to injured or dead oysters.

Food Source	Dry Season	Wet Season
Other Primary Producers	10%	10%
Zooplankton	8%	7%
Polychaetes	1%	1%
Small Macrocrustaceans	5%	5%
Amphipods	43%	38%
Other Shrimps	10%	8%
Freshwater Invertebrates	0%	3%
Aquatic Insects & Larvae	8%	13%
POC	15%	15%

Food energy content: 4.714 [kcal/g]
