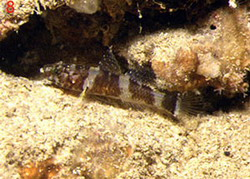
- Marcelogobius splechtnai

Scientific classification
- Kingdom: Animalia
- Phylum: Chordata
- Class: Actinopterygii
- Order: Gobiiformes
- Family: Gobiidae
- Subfamily: Gobiinae
- Genus: Marcelogobius; Schliewen, 2023

Type species
- Marcelogobius splechtnai Ahnelt & Patzner, 1995

= Marcelogobius =

Genus of fishes

Marcelogobius is a genus of small marine fish in the subfamily Gobiinae, the "true gobies". They are native to the eastern Atlantic Ocean and the Mediterranean Sea. The name of the genus honours Croatian biologist Marcelo Kovačić, added to Latin gobius meaning "goby".

== Species ==
Three recognized species are in this genus:

- Marcelogobius helenae (Van Tassell & A. Kramer, 2014) (Helen's goby)
- Marcelogobius janetarum (Schliewen, Wirtz & Kovačić, 2018)
- Marcelogobius splechtnai (Ahnelt & Patzner, 1995)
