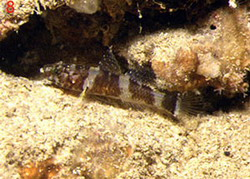

Conservation status
- Least Concern (IUCN 3.1)

Scientific classification
- Kingdom: Animalia
- Phylum: Chordata
- Class: Actinopterygii
- Order: Gobiiformes
- Family: Gobiidae
- Genus: Marcelogobius
- Species: M. splechtnai

Binomial name
- Marcelogobius splechtnai (Ahnelt & Patzner, 1995)

Synonyms
- Didogobius splechtnai

= Marcelogobius splechtnai =

Species of fish

Marcelogobius splechtnai is a species of goby native to the Mediterranean Sea along the coasts of Spain and Italy where they inhabit caves with sandy substrates at depths from 7 to 11 m (20 to 40 ft). This species can reach a standard length of 2.3 cm (0.91 in). The specific name honours Professor Heinz Splechtna (1933-1996), a marine biologist at the University of Vienna.
