= List of freshwater fish of Japan =

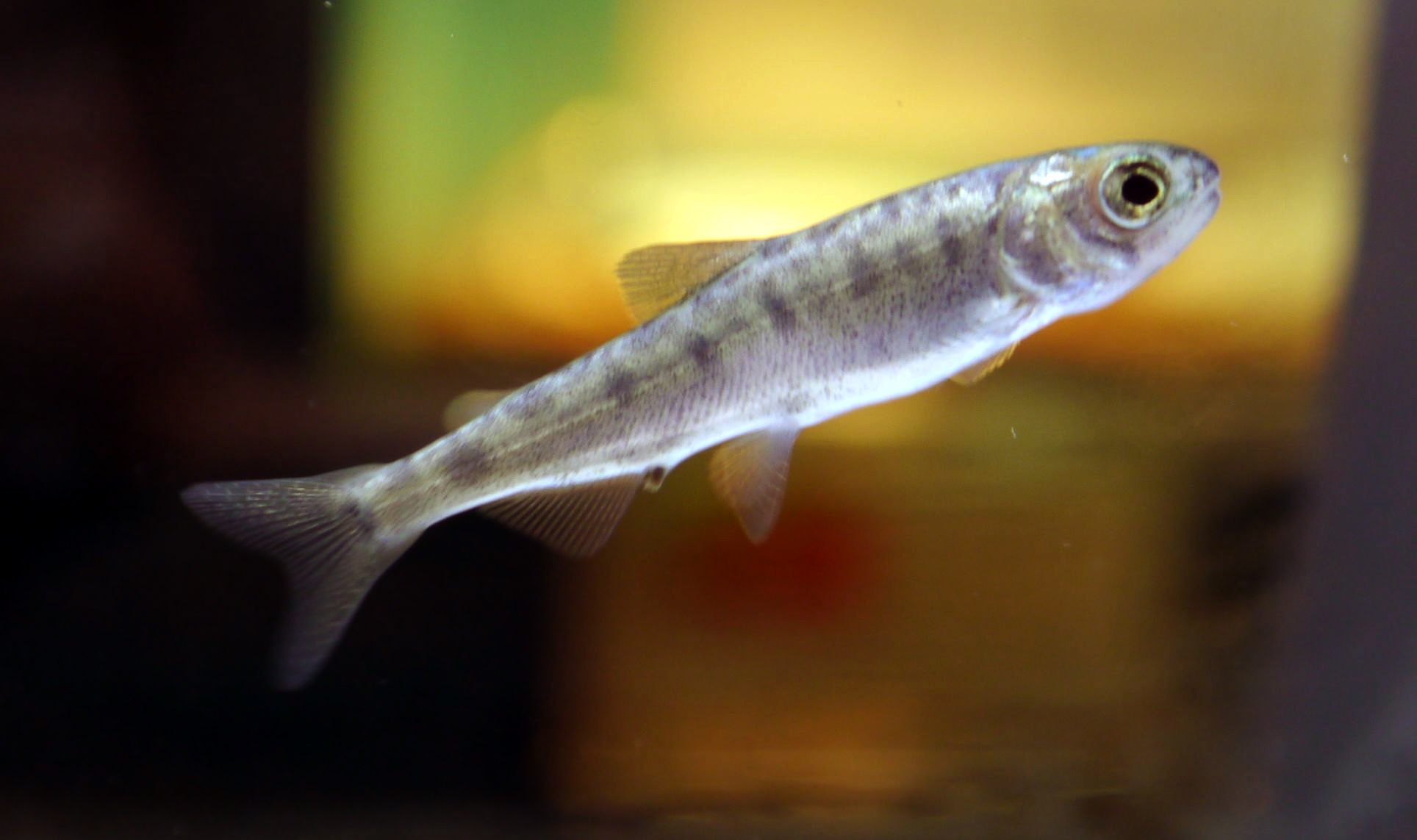
The Black kokanee or Kunimasu, once thought to be extinct, is now classed as extinct in the wild

This list of freshwater fish recorded in Japan is primarily based on the IUCN Red List, which, for fish found in inland waters, details the conservation status of some two hundred and sixty-one species, seventy-three of them endemic. Of these, one is assessed as extinct in the wild (the endemic Black kokanee), seven as critically endangered (the Sakhalin sturgeon, Chinese sturgeon, Sakhalin taimen, and endemic Tango stripe spined loach, Kissing loach, Cave goby, and Urauchi-isohaze), twenty as endangered, twelve as vulnerable, ten as near threatened, one hundred and seventy-nine as of least concern, and thirty-two as data deficient. This total includes species such as the Immaculate puffer, which, according to the IUCN Red List, may be characterized as a "marine species which occurs in estuaries...but is not dependent on these systems".

According to statistics accompanying the 2020 Japanese Ministry of the Environment (MoE) Red List, and the 2014 Red Data Book, approximately four hundred species and subspecies of freshwater fish and brackish water fish are to be found, but the conservation status of only two hundred and forty-five is detailed. Of these, three taxa are extinct from a domestic perspective (the Green sturgeon, Short ninespine stickleback, and endemic Suwa gudgeon), one extinct in the wild (the endemic Black kokanee), seventy-one critically endangered, fifty-four endangered, forty-four vulnerable, thirty-five near threatened, and thirty-seven data deficient. As of January 2021, for their protection, ten species and subspecies have been designated National Endangered Species by Cabinet Order in accordance with the 1992 Act on Conservation of Endangered Species of Wild Fauna and Flora.

A 2017 study, drawing on the 2013 edition of Fishes of Japan (日本産魚類検索), edited by Nakabo Tetsuji, and the 2001 edition of Freshwater Fishes of Japan (日本の淡水魚), edited by Kawanabe Hiroya, and including only those that "largely spend their lives in freshwater or diadromous fishes that reproduce in freshwater", but excluding those of the Ryūkyū Islands, lists some one hundred and eighty-one taxa, thirty-one of which, though they may have an established Japanese name and be written about at some length, are yet to be formally described, and as yet have no scientific binomial or trinomial. As for the inland water fishes of the Ryūkyūs, a 2014 checklist detailed some 678 species, in 110 families, and 27 orders, but of these, 334 are primarily marine species "but accidentally migrate to inland waters", with a further 229 estuarine species (143 residential, 86 peripheral), 59 species being fluvial, and 56 diadromous. In addition, it is noted that most of the fluvial species on Okinawa Island are alien. A 1998 study, drawing on earlier editions of the above works by Nakabo and Kawanabe, lists 211 taxa nationwide, in 35 families, and 15 orders, comprising 134 fluvial and lacustrine fishes (63%) and 77 diadromous fishes (37%), including 88 endemics (41%) and 23 exotics (11%).

As of the 7 July 2021 update, Eschmeyer's Catalog of Fishes returns three hundred and forty species records for freshwater fishes of Japan, excluding synonyms unless valid as a subspecies, and four hundred and thirty-two brackish water fishes, one hundred and ninety-two records representing those found in both systems, one hundred and fifty-six of which are also found in marine environments.

Other than the lampreys with which the list begins, which are jawless fish, all orders are within the clade Actinopterygii, ray-finned fishes.

== Order: Petromyzontiformes ==
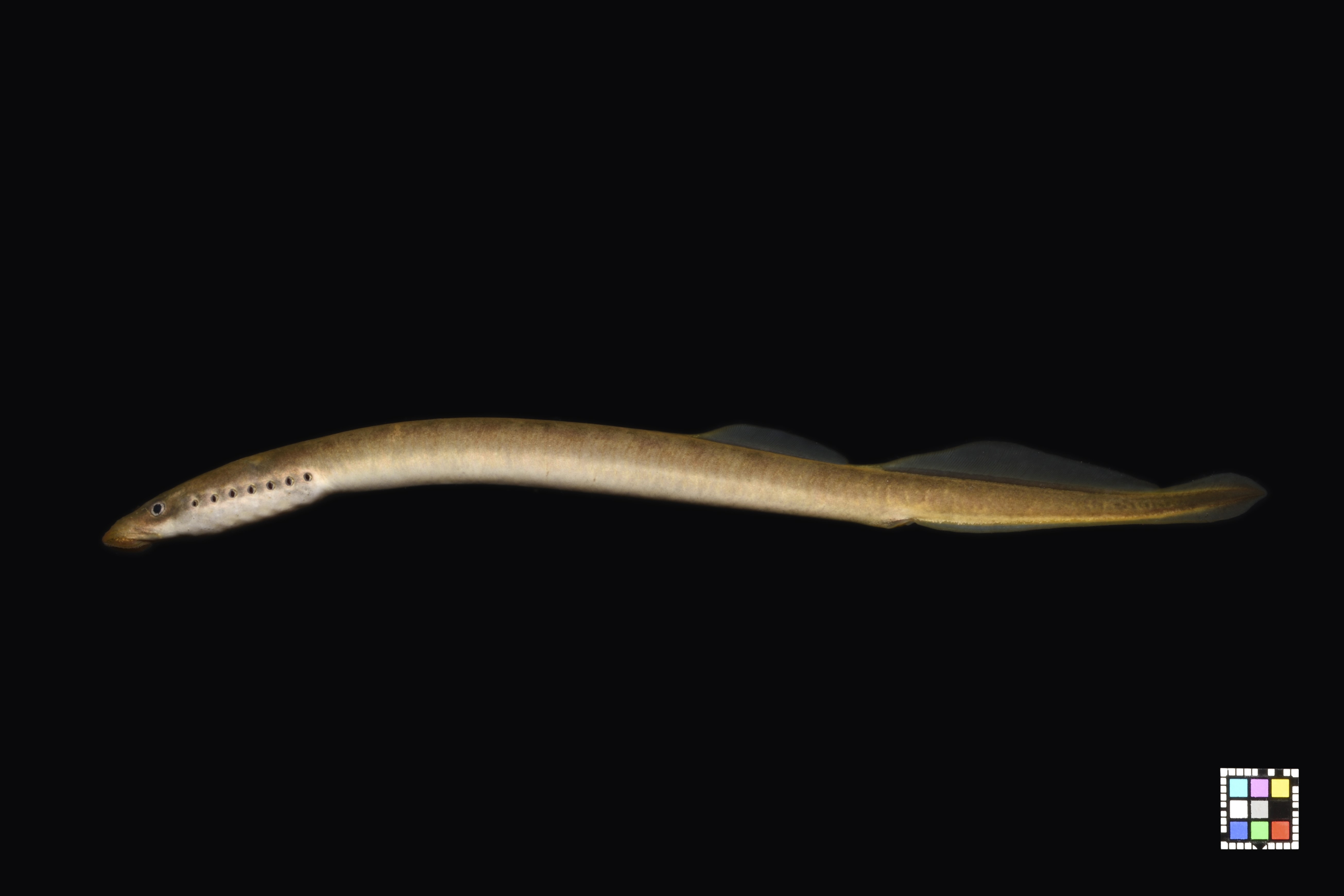
Far Eastern brook lamprey

- Family: Petromyzontidae
  - Genus: Entosphenus
    - Pacific lamprey, Entosphenus tridentatus
  - Genus: Lethenteron
    - Arctic lamprey, Lethenteron camtschaticum LC^{IUCN} (MoE: VU (as Lethenteron japonicum))
    - Siberian brook lamprey, Lethenteron kessleri (MoE: NT)
    - Far Eastern brook lamprey, Lethenteron reissneri LC^{IUCN}

== Order: Acipenseriformes ==
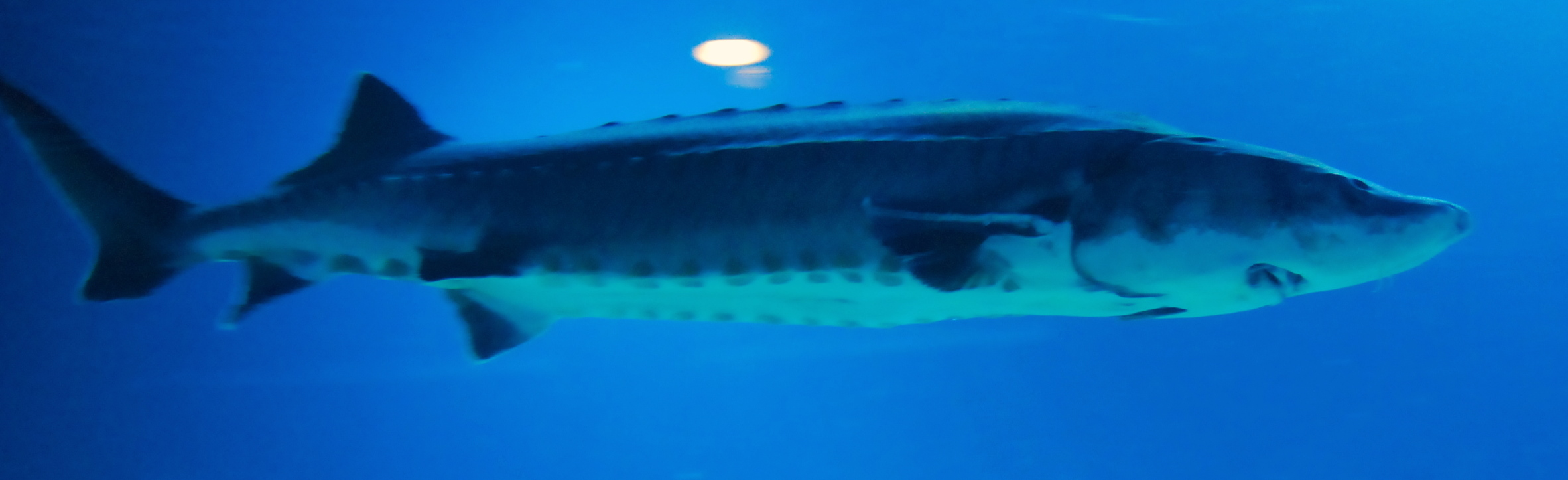
Chinese sturgeon

- Family: Acipenseridae
  - Genus: Acipenser
    - Green sturgeon, Acipenser medirostris NT^{IUCN} (MoE: EX)
    - Sakhalin sturgeon, Acipenser mikadoi CR^{IUCN}
    - Chinese sturgeon, Acipenser sinensis CR^{IUCN}

== Order: Anguilliformes ==
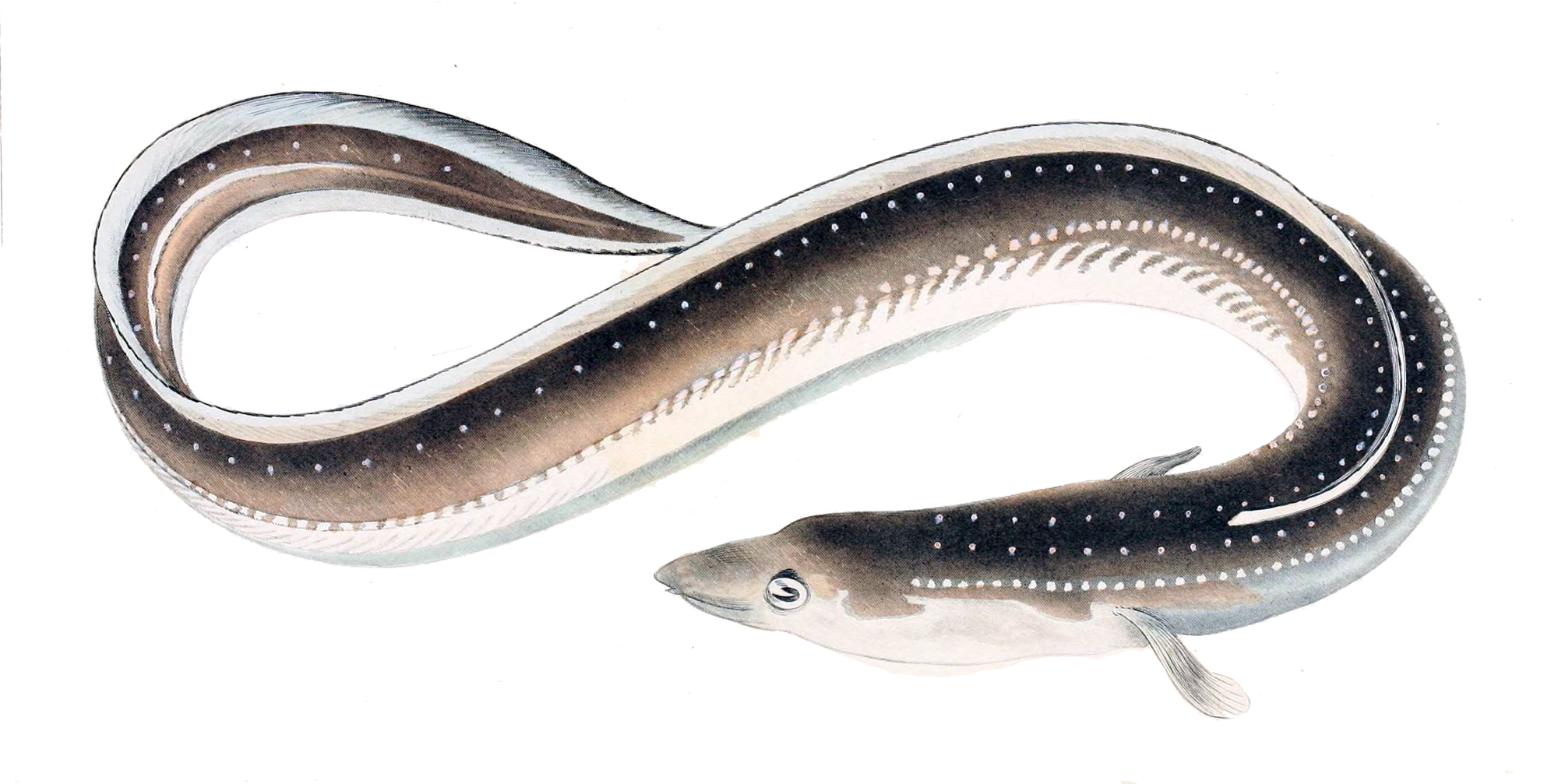
Japanese eel

- Family: Anguillidae
  - Genus: Anguilla
    - Shortfin eel, Anguilla bicolor NT^{IUCN}
      - Indian shortfin eel, A. b. pacifica (MoE: DD)
    - Japanese eel, Anguilla japonica EN^{IUCN} (MoE: EN)
    - Marbled eel, Anguilla marmorata LC^{IUCN}
- Family: Muraenesocidae
  - Genus: Muraenesox
    - Daggertooth pike conger, Muraenesox cinereus LC^{IUCN}
- Family: Muraenidae
  - Genus: Echidna
    - Pink-lipped moray eel, Echidna rhodochilus (MoE: CR)
  - Genus: Uropterygius
    - Brown moray eel, Uropterygius concolor LC^{IUCN} (MoE: CR)

== Order: Atheriniformes ==
- Family: Atherinidae
  - Genus: Atherinomorus
    - Tropical silverside, Atherinomorus duodecimalis LC^{IUCN} (MoE: DD)
  - Genus: Hypoatherina
    - Samoan silverside, Hypoatherina temminckii LC^{IUCN} (MoE: DD)
- Family: Atherinopsidae
  - Genus: Odontesthes
    - Argentinian silverside, Odontesthes bonariensis (introduced)

== Order: Aulopiformes ==
- Family: Synodontidae
  - Genus: Saurida
    - Clouded lizardfish, Saurida nebulosa LC^{IUCN}

== Order: Beloniformes ==
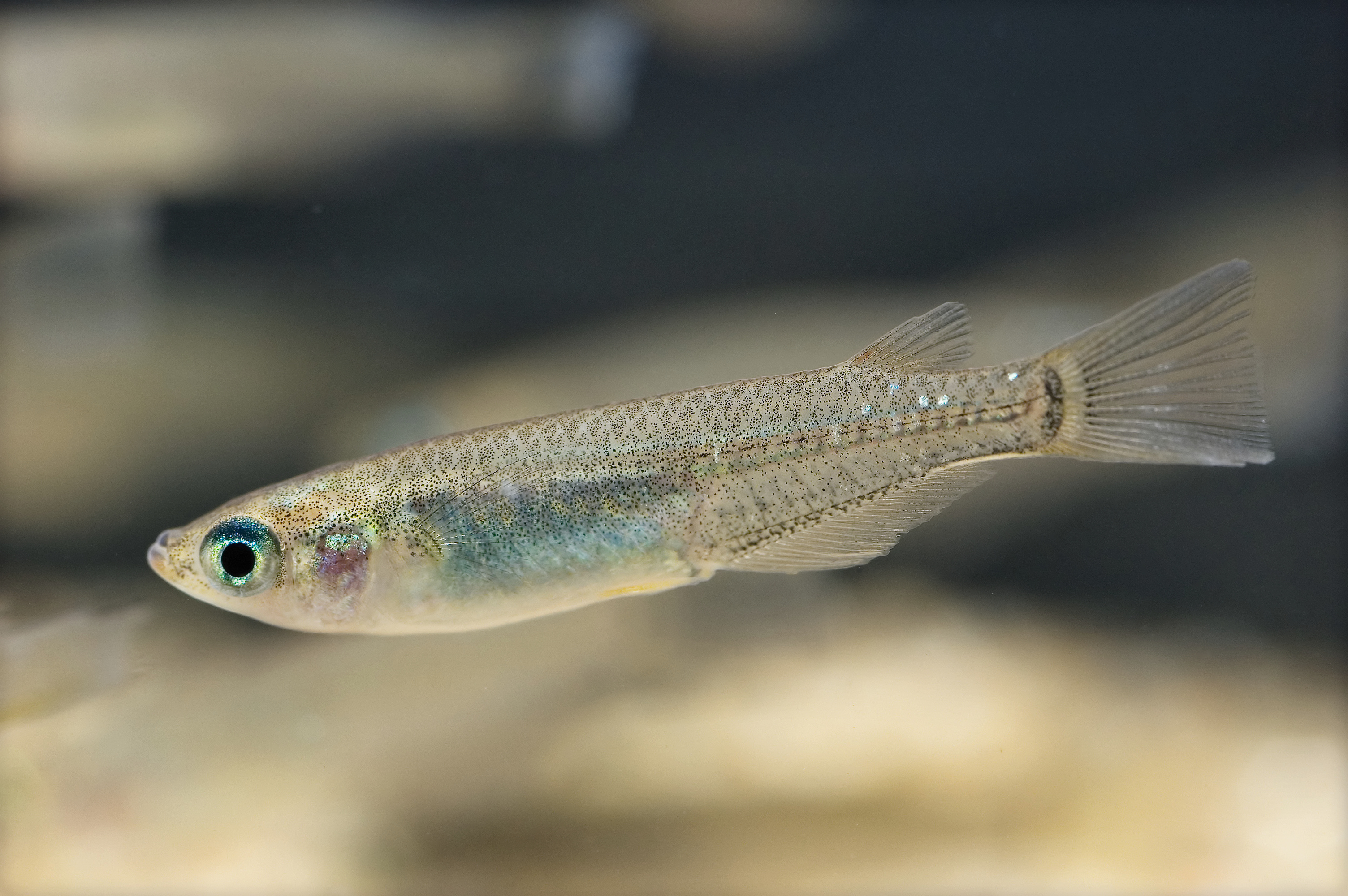
Japanese rice fish

- Family: Adrianichthyidae
  - Genus: Oryzias
    - Japanese rice fish, Oryzias latipes LC^{IUCN} (endemic) (MoE: VU)
    - Kitanomedaka, Oryzias sakaizumii LC^{IUCN} (endemic) (MoE: VU)
- Family: Hemiramphidae
  - Genus: Hyporhamphus
    - Asian pencil halfbeak, Hyporhamphus intermedius (MoE: NT)
- Family: Zenarchopteridae
  - Genus: Zenarchopterus
    - Duncker's river garfish, Zenarchopterus dunckeri LC^{IUCN} (MoE: NT)

== Order: Callionymiformes ==
- Family: Callionymidae
  - Genus: Pseudocalliurichthys
    - Ryukyu ruddertail dragonet, Pseudocalliurichthys ikedai (MoE: DD)

== Order: Clupeiformes ==
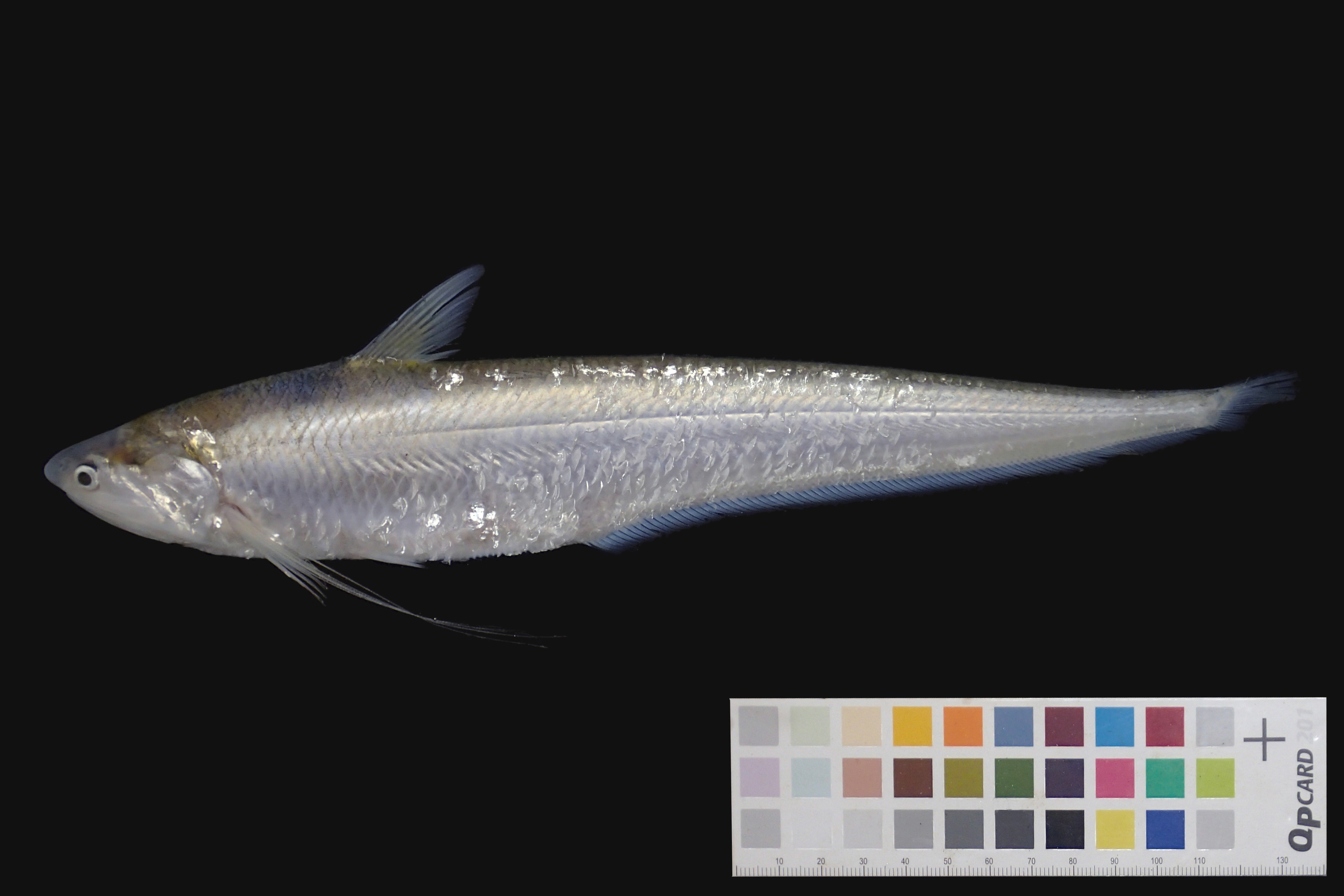
Japanese grenadier anchovy

- Family: Clupeidae
  - Genus: Clupea
    - Pacific herring, Clupea pallasii DD^{IUCN}
- Family: Engraulidae
  - Genus: Coilia
    - Japanese grenadier anchovy, Coilia nasus EN^{IUCN} (MoE: EN)
  - Genus: Nematalosa
    - Western Pacific gizzard shad, Nematalosa come LC^{IUCN}
    - Japanese gizzard shad, Nematalosa japonica LC^{IUCN} (MoE: EN)
    - Bloch's gizzard shad, Nematalosa nasus LC^{IUCN}
  - Genus: Thryssa
    - Baelama anchovy, Thryssa baelama LC^{IUCN}

== Order: Cypriniformes ==
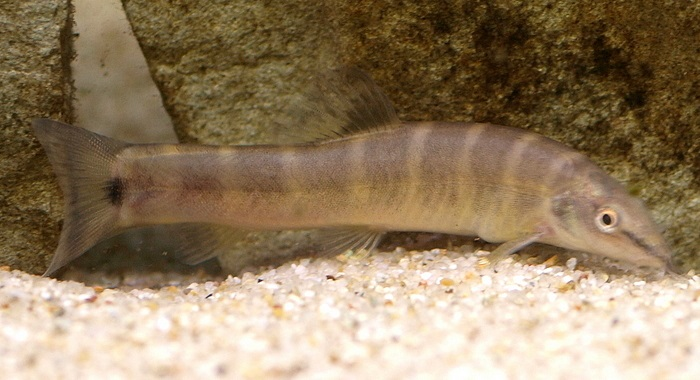
Kissing loach

- Family: Cobitidae
  - Genus: Cobitis
    - Japanese striped loach, Cobitis biwae
    - Ajime loach, Cobitis delicata LC^{IUCN} (endemic) (MoE: VU (as Niwaella delicata))
    - Ariake stripe spined loach, Cobitis kaibarai VU^{IUCN} (endemic) (MoE: EN)
    - Large stripe spined loach, Cobitis magnostriata EN^{IUCN} (endemic) (MoE: EN)
    - Yamato spined loach, Cobitis matsubarae LC^{IUCN} (endemic) (MoE: VU)
    - Cobitis melanoleuca LC^{IUCN}
    - Small stripe spined loach, Cobitis minamorii NT^{IUCN} (endemic)
      - Sanyōkogatasuji-shimadojō, C. m. minamorii (MoE: CR)
      - Biwakogatasuji-shimadojō, C. m. oumiensis (MoE: EN)
      - Saninkogatasuji-shimadojō, C. m. saninensis (MoE: EN)
      - Tokaikogatasuji-shimadojō, C. m. tokaiensis (MoE: EN)
      - Yodokogatasuji-shimadojō, C. m. yodoensis (MoE: CR)
    - Oyodo stripe spined loach, Cobitis sakahoko EN^{IUCN} (endemic) (MoE: EN)
    - Dwarf gravel loach, Cobitis shikokuensis VU^{IUCN} (endemic) (MoE: EN)
    - Namisuji-shimadojō, Cobitis striata
      - Ongasuji-shimadojō, C. s. fuchigamii (MoE: EN)
      - Hakatasuji-shimadojō, C. s. hakataensis (MoE: CR)
      - Chūgatasuji-shimadojō, C. s. striata (MoE: VU)
    - Secret loach, Cobitis takatsuensis NT^{IUCN} (endemic) (MoE: EN)
    - Tango stripe spined loach, Cobitis takenoi CR^{IUCN} (endemic) (MoE: CR)
  - Genus: Misgurnus
    - Pond loach, Misgurnus anguillicaudatus LC^{IUCN} (MoE: NT)
  - Genus: Parabotia
    - Kissing loach, Parabotia curtus CR^{IUCN} (endemic) (MoE: CR)
- Family: Cyprinidae
  - Genus: Abbottina
    - Chinese false gudgeon, Abbottina rivularis (endemic) (MoE: EN)
  - Genus: Acheilognathus
    - Striped bitterling, Acheilognathus cyanostigma EN^{IUCN} (endemic) (MoE: CR)
    - Deepbodied bitterling, Acheilognathus longipinnis EN^{IUCN} (endemic) (MoE: CR)
    - Giant Chinese bitterling, Acheilognathus macropterus DD^{IUCN} (introduced)
    - Genuine bitterling, Acheilognathus melanogaster VU^{IUCN} (endemic) (MoE: EN)
    - Flat bitterling, Acheilognathus rhombeus
    - Tabira bitterling, Acheilognathus tabira NT^{IUCN} (endemic)
      - Red tabira bitterling, A. t. erythropterus (MoE: EN)
      - Southern red tabira bitterling, A. t. jordani (MoE: CR)
      - Blotched tabira bitterling, A. t. nakamurae (MoE: CR)
      - White tabira bitterling, A. t. tabira (MoE: EN)
      - Northern red tabira bitterling, A. t. tohokuensis (MoE: EN)
    - Metallic bitterling, Acheilognathus typus VU^{IUCN} (endemic) (MoE: CR)
  - Genus: Aphyocypris
    - Chinese bleak, Aphyocypris chinensis LC^{IUCN} (MoE: CR)
  - Genus: Biwia
    - Yodo gudgeon, Biwia yodoensis EN^{IUCN} (endemic) (MoE: EN)
    - Biwa gudgeon, Biwia zezera LC^{IUCN} (endemic) (MoE: VU)
  - Genus: Carassius
    - Goldfish, Carassius auratus LC^{IUCN}
      - Round crucian carp, C. a. grandoculis (endemic) (MoE: EN (as Carassius buergeri grandoculis))
    - Japanese white crucian carp, Carassius cuvieri EN^{IUCN} (MoE: EN)
    - Japanese silver crucian carp, Carassius langsdorfii
  - Genus: Ctenopharyngodon
    - Grass carp, Ctenopharyngodon idella (introduced)
  - Genus: Cyprinus
    - Common carp, Cyprinus carpio VU^{IUCN}
    - Amur carp, Cyprinus rubrofuscus LC^{IUCN} (introduced)
  - Genus: Danio
    - Pearl danio, Danio albolineatus LC^{IUCN} (introduced on Okinawa Island)
    - Zebrafish, Danio rerio LC^{IUCN} (introduced on Okinawa Island)
  - Genus: Gnathopogon
    - Biwa moroko gudgeon, Gnathopogon caerulescens EN^{IUCN} (endemic) (MoE: CR)
    - Gnathopogon elongatus (endemic)
      - Field gudgeon, G. e. elongatus
      - Suwa gudgeon, G. e. suwae (MoE: EX)
  - Genus: Hemibarbus
    - Barbel steed, Hemibarbus barbus
    - Zunaganigoi, Hemibarbus longirostris LC^{IUCN}
  - Genus: Hemiculter
    - Sharpbelly, Hemiculter leucisculus LC^{IUCN}
  - Genus: Hemigrammocypris
    - Golden venus fish, Hemigrammocypris neglectus LC^{IUCN} (endemic) (MoE: EN)
  - Genus: Hypophthalmichthys
    - Silver carp, Hypophthalmichthys molitrix NT^{IUCN} (introduced)
    - Bighead carp, Hypophthalmichthys nobilis DD^{IUCN} (introduced)
  - Genus: Ischikauia
    - Lakeweed chub, Ischikauia steenackeri EN^{IUCN} (endemic) (MoE: CR)
  - Genus: Mylopharyngodon
    - Black carp, Mylopharyngodon piceus DD^{IUCN} (introduced)
  - Genus: Nipponocypris
    - Numamutsu, Nipponocypris sieboldii
    - Dark chub, Nipponocypris temminckii
  - Genus: Opsariichthys
    - Chinese hook snout carp, Opsariichthys bidens LC^{IUCN}
    - Amur three-lips, Opsariichthys uncirostris
      - Hasu, O. u. uncirostris (MoE: VU)
  - Genus: Paramisgurnus
    - Large-scale loach, Paramisgurnus dabryanus (introduced)
  - Genus: Pseudogobio
    - Pike gudgeon, Pseudogobio esocinus
  - Genus: Pseudorasbora
    - Topmouth gudgeon, Pseudorasbora parva LC^{IUCN}
    - Ushimotsugo minnow, Pseudorasbora pugnax VU^{IUCN} (endemic) (MoE: CR)
    - Shinai topmouth gudgeon, Pseudorasbora pumila EN^{IUCN} (endemic) (MoE: CR)
  - Genus: Pungtungia
    - Black stripe gudgeon, Pungtungia herzi
  - Genus: Rhodeus
    - Kyushu bitterling, Rhodeus atremius NT^{IUCN} (endemic)
      - Kyushu rose bitterling, R. a. atremius (MoE: EN)
      - Suigen rose bitterling, R. a. suigensis (MoE: CR)
    - Rosy bitterling, Rhodeus ocellatus DD^{IUCN}
      - Japanese rose bitterling, R. o. kurumeus (MoE: CR)
      - Rose bitterling, R. o. ocellatus (introduced)
  - Genus: Rhynchocypris
    - Amur minnow, Rhynchocypris lagowskii
      - Japanese fat minnow, R. l. steindachneri
      - Yamanaka minnow, R. l. yamamotis (MoE: DD (as Phoxinus lagowskii yamamotis))
    - Chinese minnow, Rhynchocypris oxycephalus
      - Takahaya, R. o. jouyi
    - Lake minnow, Rhynchocypris percnurus LC^{IUCN}
      - Sakhalin lake minnow, R. p. sachalinensis (MoE: NT (as Phoxinus percnurus sachalinensis))
    - Sakhalin minnow, Rhynchocypris sachalinensis LC^{IUCN}
  - Genus: Sarcocheilichthys
    - Oily gudgeon, Sarcocheilichthys biwaensis EN^{IUCN} (endemic) (MoE: CR)
    - Higai minnow, Sarcocheilichthys variegatus
      - Biwa minnow, S. v. microoculus
      - Kawa-higai, S. v. variegatus (MoE: NT)
  - Genus: Squalidus
    - Khanka gudgeon, Squalidus chankaensis
      - Sugo-moroko, S. c. biwae (MoE: VU)
      - Kōrai-moroko, S. c. tsuchigae
    - Squalidus gracilis
      - Itomoroko, S. g. gracilis
    - Squalidus japonicus
      - Japanese gudgeon, S. j. japonicus (MoE: VU)
  - Genus: Tanakia
    - Slender bitterling, Tanakia lanceolata (MoE: NT)
    - Oily bitterling, Tanakia limbata LC^{IUCN} (endemic) (MoE: NT)
    - Tokyo bitterling, Tanakia tanago EN^{IUCN} (endemic) (MoE: CR)
  - Genus: Tribolodon
    - Pacific redfin, Tribolodon brandtii
      - Jūsan-ugui, T. b. brandtii
      - Maruta [ja], T. b. maruta
    - Big-scaled redfin, Tribolodon hakonensis
    - Long lowerjaw dace, Tribolodon nakamurai EN^{IUCN} (endemic) (MoE: EN)
    - Rosyface dace, Tribolodon sachalinensis
  - Genus: Zacco
    - Freshwater minnow, Zacco platypus
- Family: Nemacheilidae
  - Genus: Barbatula
    - Barbatula oreas
    - Siberian stone loach, Barbatula toni
  - Genus: Lefua
    - Japanese eight barbel loach, Lefua echigonia LC^{IUCN} (endemic) (MoE: EN)
    - Ainu eight barbel loach, Lefua nikkonis LC^{IUCN} (endemic) (MoE: EN (as Lefua costata nikkonis))
    - Tōkainagare-hotokedojō, Lefua tokaiensis (endemic) (MoE: EN)
    - Nagare-hotokedojō, Lefua torrentis (endemic) (MoE: EN)

== Order: Cyprinodontiformes ==
- Family: Poeciliidae
  - Genus: Gambusia
    - Mosquitofish, Gambusia affinis LC^{IUCN} (introduced)
  - Genus: Poecilia
    - Guppy, Poecilia reticulata LC^{IUCN} (introduced)
    - Molly, Poecilia sphenops LC^{IUCN} (introduced in Hokkaidō)
  - Genus: Xiphophorus
    - Green swordtail, Xiphophorus hellerii LC^{IUCN} (introduced)
    - Southern platyfish, Xiphophorus maculatus DD^{IUCN} (introduced on Okinawa Island but population possibly extinct)

== Order: Elopiformes ==
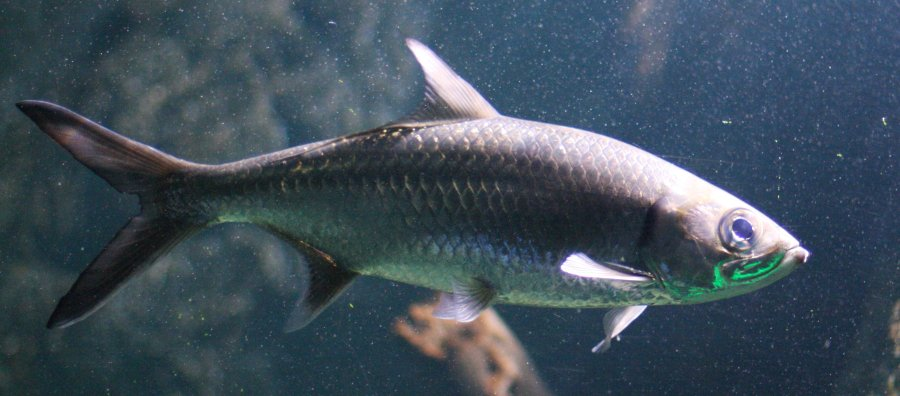
Indo-Pacific tarpon

- Family: Elopidae
  - Genus: Elops
    - Ten-pounder, Elops machnata LC^{IUCN}
- Family: Megalopidae
  - Genus: Megalops
    - Indo-Pacific tarpon, Megalops cyprinoides DD^{IUCN}

== Order: Gasterosteiformes ==
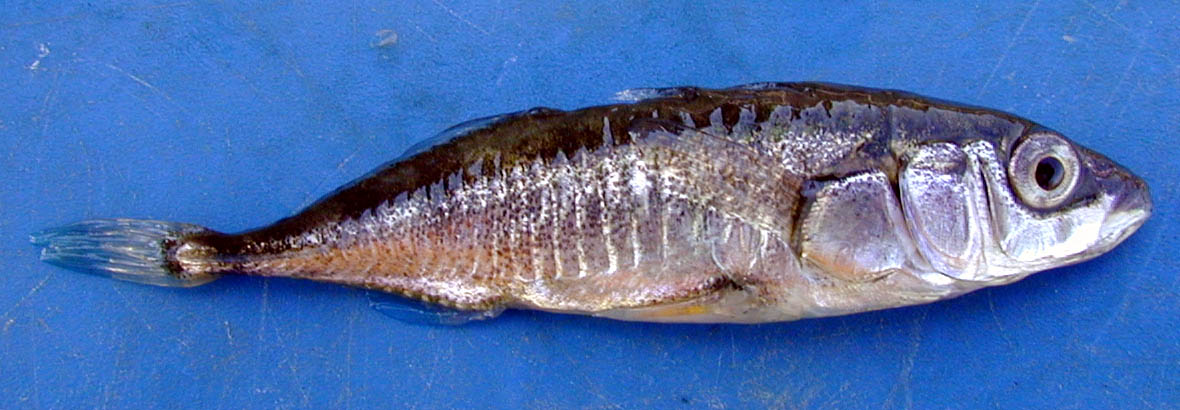
Three-spined stickleback

- Family: Gasterosteidae
  - Genus: Gasterosteus
    - Three-spined stickleback, Gasterosteus aculeatus LC^{IUCN}
    - Smallhead stickleback, Gasterosteus microcephalus
    - Japan Sea stickleback, Gasterosteus nipponicus
  - Genus: Pungitius
    - Short ninespine stickleback, Pungitius kaibarae (MoE: EX)
    - Ninespine stickleback, Pungitius pungitius LC^{IUCN}
    - Amur stickleback, Pungitius sinensis VU^{IUCN}
    - Sakhalin stickleback, Pungitius tymensis DD^{IUCN} (MoE: VU)

== Order: Gonorynchiformes ==
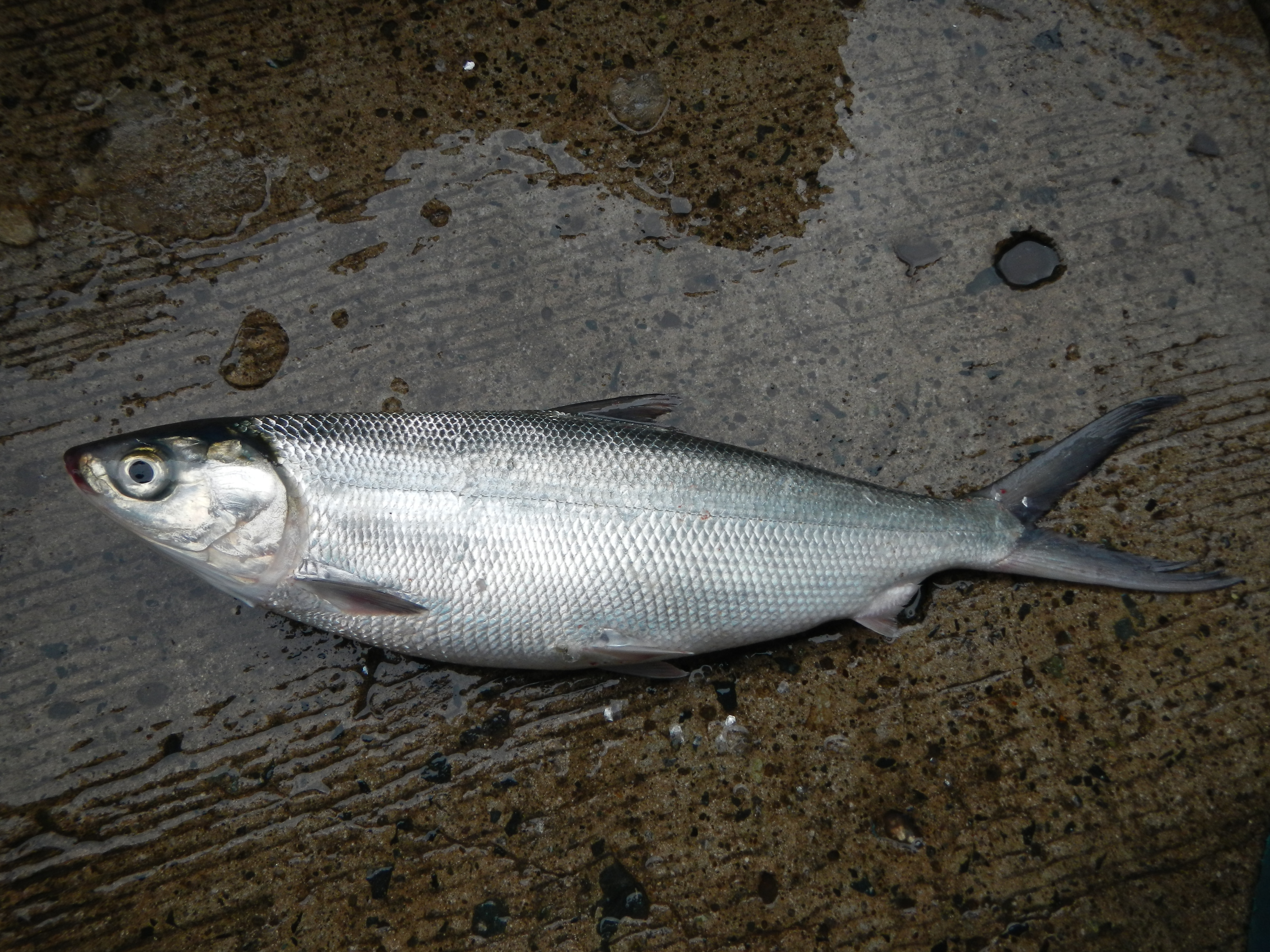
Milkfish

- Family: Chanidae
  - Genus: Chanos
    - Milkfish, Chanos chanos LC^{IUCN}

== Order: Mugiliformes ==
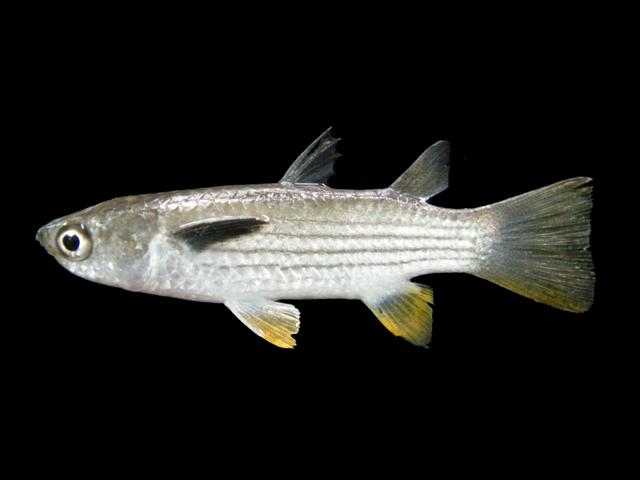
Squaretail mullet

- Family: Mugilidae
  - Genus: Cestraeus
    - Lobed river mullet, Cestraeus plicatilis DD^{IUCN} (MoE: CR)
  - Genus: Chelon
    - Otomebora mullet, Chelon melinopterus LC^{IUCN}
    - Greenback mullet, Chelon subviridis LC^{IUCN} (MoE: DD)
  - Genus: Ellochelon
    - Squaretail mullet, Ellochelon vaigiensis LC^{IUCN} (MoE: DD)
  - Genus: Crenimugil
    - Fringelip mullet, Crenimugil crenilabis LC^{IUCN}
    - Half fringelip mullet, Crenimugil heterocheilos LC^{IUCN} (MoE: EN)
    - Longfin mullet, Crenimugil pedaraki (MoE: DD (as Moolgarda pedaraki))
    - Bluespot mullet, Crenimugil seheli LC^{IUCN}
  - Genus: Osteomugil
    - Monnashibora, Osteomugil engeli LC^{IUCN} (MoE: DD (as Moolgarda engeli))
  - Genus: Planiliza
    - Largescale mullet, Planiliza macrolepis LC^{IUCN}
  - Genus: Valamugil
    - Bluetail mullet, Valamugil buchanani LC^{IUCN}

== Order: Osmeriformes ==
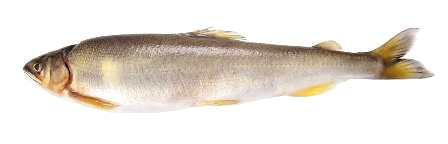
Ayu sweetfish

- Family: Osmeridae
  - Genus: Hypomesus
    - Japanese smelt, Hypomesus nipponensis LC^{IUCN}
    - Pond smelt, Hypomesus olidus LC^{IUCN} (MoE: NT)
  - Genus: Osmerus
    - Arctic rainbow smelt, Osmerus dentex LC^{IUCN}
- Family: Plecoglossidae
  - Genus: Plecoglossus
    - Sweetfish, Plecoglossus altivelis DD^{IUCN}
      - Ayu, P. a. altivelis
      - Ryukyu ayu, P. a. ryukyuensis (endemic) (MoE: CR)
  - Genus: Spirinchus
    - Shishamo smelt, Spirinchus lanceolatus
- Family: Salangidae
  - Genus: Neosalanx
    - Ariake dwarf icefish, Neosalanx reganius EN^{IUCN} (endemic) (MoE: CR)
  - Genus: Salanx
    - Ariake icefish, Salanx ariakensis (MoE: CR)

== Order: Perciformes ==
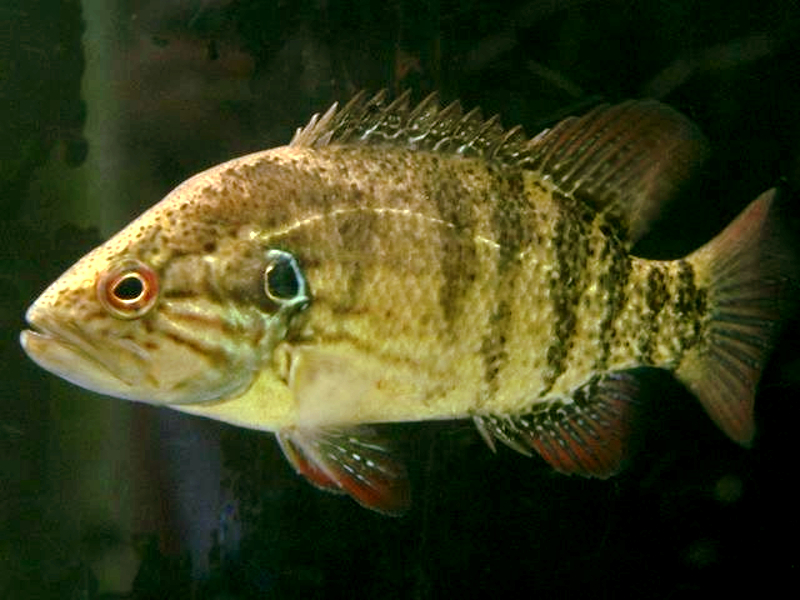
Japanese perch

- Family: Ambassidae
  - Genus: Ambassis
    - Malabar glassy perchlet, Ambassis dussumieri LC^{IUCN}
    - Long-spined glassfish, Ambassis interrupta LC^{IUCN} (MoE: DD)
    - Estuarine glass perchlet, Ambassis macracanthus DD^{IUCN} (MoE: DD)
    - Flag-tailed glassfish, Ambassis miops LC^{IUCN}
    - Bleeker's glass perchlet, Ambassis urotaenia LC^{IUCN}
    - Vachell's glassfish, Ambassis vachellii LC^{IUCN}
  - Genus: Chanda
    - Indian glassy fish, Chanda ranga LC^{IUCN} (introduced on Okinawa Island)
- Family: Apogonidae
  - Genus: Apogon
    - Ambon cardinalfish, Apogon amboinensis DD^{IUCN}
  - Genus: Ostorhinchus
    - Humpback cardinalfish, Ostorhinchus lateralis LC^{IUCN} (MoE: DD (as Fibramia lateralis))
  - Genus: Pseudamia
    - White-jawed cardinalfish, Pseudamia amblyuroptera (MoE: DD)
  - Genus: Yarica
    - Mangrove cardinalfish, Yarica hyalosoma LC^{IUCN} (MoE: CR)
- Family: Blenniidae
  - Genus: Omobranchus
    - Chevroned blenny, Omobranchus elongatus LC^{IUCN} (MoE: DD)
    - Gossamer blenny, Omobranchus ferox LC^{IUCN} (MoE: CR)
  - Genus: Omox
    - Omox blenny, Omox biporos LC^{IUCN} (MoE: CR)
- Family: Carangidae
  - Genus: Caranx
    - Bigeye trevally, Caranx sexfasciatus LC^{IUCN}
- Family: Centrarchidae
  - Genus: Lepomis
    - Bluegill, Lepomis macrochirus LC^{IUCN} (introduced)
  - Genus: Micropterus
    - Smallmouth bass, Micropterus dolomieu LC^{IUCN} (introduced)
    - Largemouth bass, Micropterus salmoides LC^{IUCN} (introduced)
- Family: Channidae
  - Genus: Channa
    - Northern snakehead, Channa argus (introduced)
    - Small snakehead, Channa asiatica LC^{IUCN} (introduced)
    - Blotched snakehead, Channa maculata LC^{IUCN} (introduced)
- Family: Cichlidae
  - Genus: Amatitlania
    - Convict cichlid, Amatitlania nigrofasciata DD^{IUCN} (introduced)
  - Genus: Oreochromis
    - Mozambique tilapia, Oreochromis mossambicus VU^{IUCN} (introduced)
    - Nile tilapia, Oreochromis niloticus LC^{IUCN} (introduced)
  - Genus: Otopharynx
    - Otopharynx lithobates LC^{IUCN} (introduced on Okinawa Island)
  - Genus: Tilapia
    - Redbelly tilapia, Tilapia zillii LC^{IUCN} (introduced)
- Family: Eleotridae
  - Genus: Belobranchus
    - Throat-spine gudgeon, Belobranchus belobranchus LC^{IUCN} (MoE: DD)
  - Genus: Bostrychus
    - Four-eyed sleeper, Bostrychus sinensis LC^{IUCN} (MoE: EN)
  - Genus: Bunaka
    - Green-backed gudgeon, Bunaka gyrinoides LC^{IUCN} (MoE: NT)
  - Genus: Butis
    - Ambon gudgeon, Butis amboinensis LC^{IUCN} (MoE: CR)
    - Crimson-tipped gudgeon, Butis butis LC^{IUCN}
  - Genus: Eleotris
    - Spine-cheek gudgeon, Eleotris acanthopomus LC^{IUCN}
    - Brown spine-cheek gudgeon, Eleotris fusca LC^{IUCN}
    - Broadhead sleeper, Eleotris melanosoma LC^{IUCN}
    - Spined sleeper, Eleotris oxycephala LC^{IUCN}
  - Genus: Eugnathogobius
    - Stripe-face calamiana, Eugnathogobius mindora LC^{IUCN} (MoE: NT)
  - Genus: Hypseleotris
    - Tropical carp-gudgeon, Hypseleotris cyprinoides DD^{IUCN} (MoE: EN)
  - Genus: Ophiocara
    - Spangled gudgeon, Ophiocara porocephala LC^{IUCN} (MoE: VU)
- Family: Epinephelidae
  - Genus: Epinephelus
    - Palemargin grouper, Epinephelus bontoides LC^{IUCN} (MoE: DD)
- Family: Gerreidae
  - Genus: Gerres filamentosus
    - Threadfin silverbelly, Gerres filamentosus LC^{IUCN}
- Family: Gobiidae
  - Genus: Acanthogobius
    - Yellowfin goby, Acanthogobius flavimanus LC^{IUCN}
    - Spear-like Oriental goby, Acanthogobius hasta LC^{IUCN}(endemic) (MoE: VU)
    - Minami-ashishirohaze, Acanthogobius insularis EN^{IUCN} (endemic) (MoE: VU)
  - Genus: Acentrogobius
    - Mangrove goby, Acentrogobius audax LC^{IUCN} (MoE: NT)
    - Tropical sand goby, Acentrogobius caninus LC^{IUCN} (MoE: NT)
    - Robust mangrove goby, Acentrogobius janthinopterus LC^{IUCN}
    - Sulu goby, Acentrogobius suluensis (MoE: NT)
    - Spotted green goby, Acentrogobius viridipunctatus LC^{IUCN} (MoE: VU)
  - Genus: Amblygobius
    - Link's goby, Amblygobius linki LC^{IUCN} (MoE: NT)
  - Genus: Apocryptodon
    - Spotted hidden-teeth goby, Apocryptodon punctatus LC^{IUCN} (endemic) (MoE: VU)
  - Genus: Awaous
    - Scribbled goby, Awaous grammepomus LC^{IUCN}
    - Largesnout goby, Awaous melanocephalus
    - Ocellated river goby, Awaous ocellaris
  - Genus: Bathygobius
    - Brown frillfin, Bathygobius fuscus LC^{IUCN}
  - Genus: Boleophthalmus
    - Great blue-spotted mudskipper, Boleophthalmus pectinirostris (MoE: EN)
  - Genus: Caragobius
    - Scaleless worm goby, Caragobius urolepis LC^{IUCN} (MoE: VU)
  - Genus: Chaenogobius
    - Agohaze, Chaenogobius annularis LC^{IUCN}
  - Genus: Cristatogobius
    - Hime-tosakahaze, Cristatogobius aurimaculatus (MoE: CR)
    - Tosakahaze, Cristatogobius lophius (MoE: EN)
    - Kuro-tosakahaze, Cristatogobius nonatoae (MoE: CR)
  - Genus: Eutaeniichthys
    - Brackish water goby, Eutaeniichthys gilli (MoE: NT)
  - Genus: Eviota
    - Urauchi-isohaze, Eviota ocellifer CR^{IUCN} (endemic) (MoE: CR)
  - Genus: Exyrias
    - Puntang goby, Exyrias puntang LC^{IUCN}
  - Genus: Favonigobius
    - Indo-pacific tropical sand goby, Favonigobius reichei LC^{IUCN}
  - Genus: Glossogobius
    - Golden flathead goby, Glossogobius aureus LC^{IUCN} (MoE: CR)
    - Bearded flathead goby, Glossogobius bicirrhosus LC^{IUCN} (MoE: CR)
    - Circumspect goby, Glossogobius circumspectus LC^{IUCN} (MoE: NT)
    - Bareye goby, Glossogobius giuris LC^{IUCN}
    - Iwahaze, Glossogobius illimis LC^{IUCN}
    - Urohaze goby, Glossogobius olivaceus LC^{IUCN}
  - Genus: Gobiodon
    - Rippled coral goby, Gobiodon rivulatus LC^{IUCN}
  - Genus: Gymnogobius
    - Biringo, Gymnogobius breunigii LC^{IUCN}
    - Chestnut goby, Gymnogobius castaneus LC^{IUCN} (MoE: NT)
    - Kiseruhaze, Gymnogobius cylindricus NT^{IUCN} (endemic) (MoE: EN)
    - Biwa goby, Gymnogobius isaza EN^{IUCN} (endemic) (MoE: CR)
    - Edo-haze, Gymnogobius macrognathos (MoE: VU)
    - Hebihaze, Gymnogobius mororanus (MoE: DD)
    - Koshinohaze, Gymnogobius nakamurae (MoE: CR)
    - Sumiukigori, Gymnogobius petschiliensis
    - Kubohaze, Gymnogobius scrobiculatus LC^{IUCN} (endemic) (MoE: EN)
    - Shinjiko-haze, Gymnogobius taranetzi LC^{IUCN} (MoE: VU)
    - Chikuzen-haze, Gymnogobius uchidai LC^{IUCN} (endemic) (MoE: VU)
    - Shima-ukigori, Gymnogobius opperiens
    - Floating goby, Gymnogobius urotaenia
  - Genus: Gobitrichinotus
    - Sand fish, Gobitrichinotus radiocularis LC^{IUCN} (MoE: NT)
  - Genus: Istigobius
    - Ornate goby, Istigobius ornatus LC^{IUCN}
  - Genus: Lentipes
    - Yoroi-bōzuhaze, Lentipes armatus (MoE: CR)
  - Genus: Leucopsarion
    - Ice goby, Leucopsarion petersii (MoE: VU)
  - Genus: Luciogobius
    - Cave goby, Luciogobius albus CR^{IUCN} (endemic) (MoE: CR)
    - Nemuri-mimizuhaze, Luciogobius dormitoris DD^{IUCN} (endemic) (MoE: DD)
    - Nagare-mimizuhaze, Luciogobius fluvialis DD^{IUCN} (endemic) (MoE: NT)
    - Yusui-mimizuhaze, Luciogobius fonticola DD^{IUCN} (endemic) (MoE: NT)
    - Flathead goby, Luciogobius guttatus
    - Well goby, Luciogobius pallidus DD^{IUCN} (endemic) (MoE: NT)
    - Minamihime-mimizuhaze, Luciogobius ryukyuensis NT^{IUCN} (endemic) (MoE: VU)
  - Genus: Mangarinus
    - Uchiwahaze, Mangarinus waterousi DD^{IUCN}
  - Genus: Mugilogobius
    - Bandfin mangrove goby, Mugilogobius cavifrons LC^{IUCN} (MoE: EN)
    - Yellowstripe goby, Mugilogobius chulae LC^{IUCN}
    - Dusky mangrove goby, Mugilogobius fuscus LC^{IUCN} (MoE: DD)
    - Merton's mangrove goby, Mugilogobius mertoni LC^{IUCN} (MoE: VU)
  - Genus: Odontamblyopus
    - Warasubo, Odontamblyopus lacepedii (MoE: VU)
  - Genus: Oligolepis
    - Sharptail goby, Oligolepis acutipennis LC^{IUCN}
    - Plain teardrop goby, Oligolepis stomias DD^{IUCN}
  - Genus: Oxyurichthys
    - Shimasaruhaze, Oxyurichthys takagi LC^{IUCN} (MoE: CR)
  - Genus: Pandaka
    - Lidwill's dwarf goby, Pandaka lidwilli (MoE: VU)
  - Genus: Parkraemeria
    - Ginpohaze, Parkraemeria saltator NT^{IUCN} (endemic) (MoE: VU)
  - Genus: Periophthalmus
    - Barred mudskipper, Periophthalmus argentilineatus LC^{IUCN}
    - Shuttles mudskipper, Periophthalmus modestus (MoE: NT)
  - Genus: Psammogobius
    - Sleepy goby, Psammogobius biocellatus LC^{IUCN}
  - Genus: Pseudapocryptes
    - Hokohaze, Pseudapocryptes elongatus LC^{IUCN}
  - Genus: Pseudogobius
    - Masagohaze, Pseudogobius masago (MoE: VU)
    - Black-spotted goby, Pseudogobius melanosticta LC^{IUCN} (MoE: DD (as Pseudogobius gastrospilos))
    - Northern fatnose goby, Pseudogobius poicilosoma LC^{IUCN}
  - Genus: Redigobius
    - Girdled goby, Redigobius balteatus LC^{IUCN} (endemic) (MoE: DD)
    - Speckled goby, Redigobius bikolanus LC^{IUCN}
  - Genus: Rhinogobius
    - Biwa yellow-gill goby, Rhinogobius biwaensis EN^{IUCN} (endemic) (MoE: DD)
    - Amur goby [es], Rhinogobius brunneus DD^{IUCN}
    - Lizard goby, Rhinogobius flumineus
    - Ō-yoshinobori, Rhinogobius fluviatilis
    - Barcheek goby, Rhinogobius giurinus LC^{IUCN}
    - Orange Amur goby, Rhinogobius kurodai
    - Hori-yoshinobori, Rhinogobius mizunoi
    - Shima-yoshinobori, Rhinogobius nagoyae
    - Ogasawara freshwater goby, Rhinogobius ogasawaraensis VU^{IUCN} (endemic) (MoE: EN)
    - Tōkai-yoshinobori, Rhinogobius telma (MoE: NT)
    - Shimahire-yoshinobori, Rhinogobius tyoni (MoE: NT)
  - Genus: Scartelaos
    - Walking goby, Scartelaos histophorus LC^{IUCN} (MoE: CR)
  - Genus: Schismatogobius
    - Shima-esohaze, Schismatogobius ampluvinculus DD^{IUCN} (MoE: EN)
    - Kaeru-esohaze, Schismatogobius marmoratus LC^{IUCN}
    - Esohaze, Schismatogobius roxasi EN^{IUCN} (MoE: EN)
  - Genus: Sicyopterus
    - Grazing goby, Sicyopterus japonicus
    - Red-tailed goby, Sicyopterus lagocephalus LC^{IUCN} (MoE: VU)
    - Sicyopterus macrostetholepis'
  - Genus: Sicyopus
    - Hinokoromo-bōzuhaze, Sicyopus auxilimentus DD^{IUCN} (MoE: DD)
    - Aka-bōzuhaze, Sicyopus zosterophorus LC^{IUCN} (MoE: CR)
  - Genus: Silhouettea
    - Shiranui-haze, Silhouettea dotui LC^{IUCN} (endemic) (MoE: NT)
  - Genus: Smilosicyopus
    - Kaeru-haze, Smilosicyopus leprurus LC^{IUCN} (endemic) (MoE: CR)
  - Genus: Stenogobius
    - Dōke-haze, Stenogobius ophthalmoporus LC^{IUCN} (MoE: DD)
  - Genus: Stiphodon
    - Hisui-bōzuhaze, Stiphodon alcedo (MoE: CR)
    - Konteri-bōzuhaze, Stiphodon atropurpureus LC^{IUCN} (MoE: CR)
    - Hayase-bōzuhaze, Stiphodon imperiorientis VU^{IUCN} (endemic) (MoE: CR)
    - Torafu-bōzuhaze, Stiphodon multisquamus DD^{IUCN} (MoE: DD)
    - Niraikanai-bōzuhaze, Stiphodon niraikanaiensis (MoE: DD)
    - Nanyō-bōzuhaze, Stiphodon percnopterygionus DD^{IUCN}
    - Kakiirohime-bōzuhaze, Stiphodon surrufus LC^{IUCN} (MoE: DD)
  - Genus: Taenioides
    - Eel worm goby, Taenioides anguillaris LC^{IUCN}
    - Whiskered eel goby, Taenioides cirratus DD^{IUCN} (MoE: EN)
  - Genus: Tridentiger
    - Shokihaze goby, Tridentiger barbatus (MoE: NT)
    - Short-spined Japanese trident goby, Tridentiger brevispinis
    - Shimofuri goby, Tridentiger bifasciatus LC^{IUCN}
    - Naganogori, Tridentiger kuroiwae LC^{IUCN} (endemic)
    - Bare-naped goby, Tridentiger nudicervicus (MoE: NT)
    - Japanese trident goby, Tridentiger obscurus
    - Chameleon goby, Tridentiger trigonocephalus LC^{IUCN}
  - Genus: Trypauchen
    - Indo-Pacific burrowing goby, Trypauchen vagina LC^{IUCN}
  - Genus: Trypauchenopsis
    - Bearded eel goby, Trypauchenopsis intermedia LC^{IUCN} (MoE: VU)
  - Genus: Yongeichthys
    - Shadow goby, Yongeichthys nebulosus LC^{IUCN}
- Family: Haemulidae
  - Genus: Plectorhinchus
    - Giant sweetlips, Plectorhinchus albovittatus (MoE: DD)
    - Brown sweetlips, Plectorhinchus gibbosus LC^{IUCN}
- Family: Kraemeriidae
  - Genus: Kraemeria
    - Tonga-sunahaze, Kraemeria tongaensis LC^{IUCN} (MoE: DD)
- Family: Kuhliidae
  - Genus: Kuhlia
    - Dark-margined flagtail, Kuhlia marginata LC^{IUCN}
    - Five-bar flagtail, Kuhlia mugil LC^{IUCN}
    - Silver flagtail, Kuhlia munda DD^{IUCN} (MoE: EN)
    - Jungle perch, Kuhlia rupestris LC^{IUCN}
- Family: Lateolabracidae
  - Genus: Lateolabrax
    - Japanese sea bass, Lateolabrax japonicus
- Family: Latidae
  - Genus: Lates
    - Barramundi, Lates calcarifer LC^{IUCN}
    - Japanese barramundi, Lates japonicus VU^{IUCN} (endemic) (MoE: EN)
- Family: Leiognathidae
  - Genus: Aurigequula
    - Striped ponyfish, Aurigequula fasciata LC^{IUCN}
  - Genus: Equulites
    - Whipfin ponyfish, Equulites leuciscus LC^{IUCN}
  - Genus: Eubleekeria
    - Splendid ponyfish, Eubleekeria splendens LC^{IUCN}
  - Genus: Gazza
    - Toothed ponyfish, Gazza minuta LC^{IUCN}
  - Genus: Leiognathus
    - Common ponyfish, Leiognathus equulus LC^{IUCN}
- Family: Lutjanidae
  - Genus: Lutjanus
    - Blackspot snapper, Lutjanus ehrenbergii LC^{IUCN}
    - Blacktail snapper, Lutjanus fulvus LC^{IUCN}
    - Papuan black snapper, Lutjanus goldiei (MoE: CR)
- Family: Microdesmidae
  - Genus: Parioglossus
    - Kujakuhaze, Parioglossus caeruleolineatus DD^{IUCN} (endemic) (MoE: DD)
    - Beautiful hover goby, Parioglossus formosus LC^{IUCN}
    - Blackstripe dartfish, Parioglossus lineatus DD^{IUCN} (MoE: DD)
    - Interrupted dartfish, Parioglossus interruptus (MoE: CR)
    - Estuarine dartfish, Parioglossus palustris LC^{IUCN} (MoE: VU)
    - Rainford's dartfish, Parioglossus rainfordi LC^{IUCN} (MoE: EN)
    - Yellow dartfish, Parioglossus raoi LC^{IUCN}
    - Striped dartfish, Parioglossus taeniatus LC^{IUCN} (MoE: CR)
- Family: Monodactylidae
  - Genus: Monodactylus
    - Silver moony, Monodactylus argenteus LC^{IUCN}
- Family: Odontobutidae
  - Genus: Micropercops
    - Yokoshima-donko, Micropercops swinhonis LC^{IUCN}
  - Genus: Odontobutis
    - Ishi-donko, Odontobutis hikimius NT^{IUCN} (endemic) (MoE: VU)
    - Dark sleeper, Odontobutis obscura
- Family: Osphronemidae
  - Genus: Macropodus
    - Round-tailed paradise fish, Macropodus ocellatus (introduced)
    - Paradise fish, Macropodus opercularis LC^{IUCN} (introduced?) (MoE: CR)
- Family: Pomacentridae
  - Genus: Pomacentrus
    - River damsel, Pomacentrus taeniometopon LC^{IUCN}
- Family: Rhyacichthyidae
  - Genus: Rhyacichthys
    - Loach goby, Rhyacichthys aspro DD^{IUCN} (MoE: CR)
- Family: Scatophagidae
  - Genus: Scatophagus
    - Spotted scat, Scatophagus argus LC^{IUCN}
- Family: Scombridae
  - Genus: Scomberomorus
    - Chinese mackerel, Scomberomorus sinensis DD^{IUCN}
- Family: Sillaginidae
  - Genus: Sillaginops
    - Large-scale whiting, Sillaginops macrolepis (MoE: EN)
  - Genus: Sillago
    - Small-scale whiting, Sillago parvisquamis EN^{IUCN} (MoE: CR)
- Family: Sinipercidae
  - Genus: Coreoperca
    - Japanese perch, Coreoperca kawamebari (MoE: EN)
- Family: Sparidae
  - Genus: Acanthopagrus
    - Yellowfin seabream, Acanthopagrus latus DD^{IUCN}
    - Pacific seabream, Acanthopagrus pacificus LC^{IUCN} (MoE: VU)
    - Okinawa seabream, Acanthopagrus sivicolus VU^{IUCN}
- Family: Terapontidae
  - Genus: Mesopristes
    - Silver grunter, Mesopristes argenteus LC^{IUCN} (MoE: CR)
    - Tapiroid grunter, Mesopristes cancellatus LC^{IUCN} (MoE: CR)
    - Shimizu-shimaisaki, Mesopristes iravi DD^{IUCN} (MoE: CR)
  - Genus: Terapon
    - Tiger perch, Terapon jarbua LC^{IUCN}
- Family: Toxotidae
  - Genus: Toxotes
    - Banded archerfish, Toxotes jaculatrix LC^{IUCN} (MoE: CR)
- Family: Tripterygiidae
  - Genus: Enneapterygius
    - Urauchi-hebiginpo, Enneapterygius cheni LC^{IUCN} (MoE: CR)

== Order: Pleuronectiformes ==
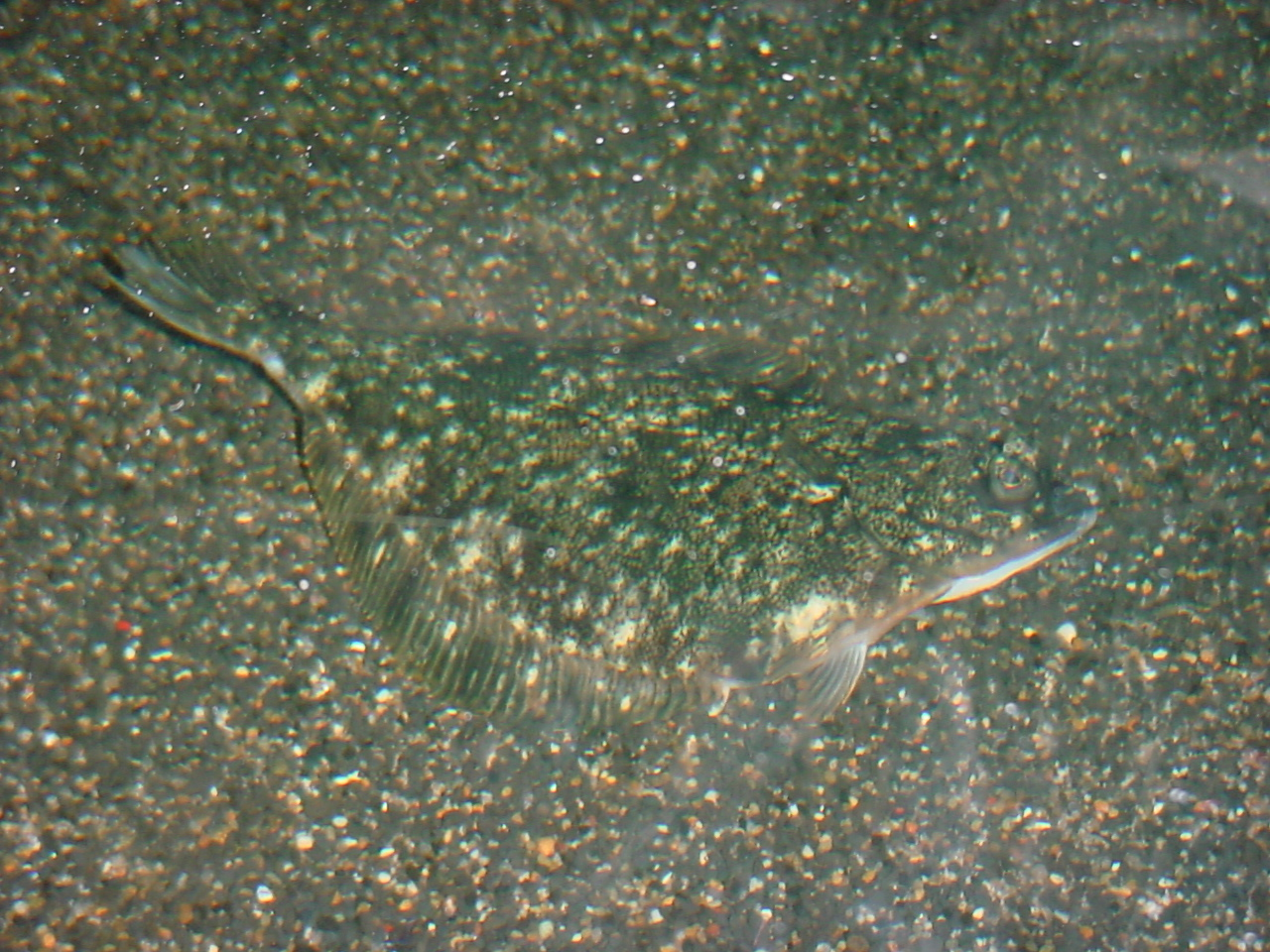
Starry flounder

- Family: Pleuronectidae
  - Genus: Platichthys
    - Starry flounder, Platichthys stellatus LC^{IUCN}
- Family: Soleidae
  - Genus: Brachirus
    - Oriental sole, Brachirus orientalis LC^{IUCN}

== Order: Salmoniformes ==
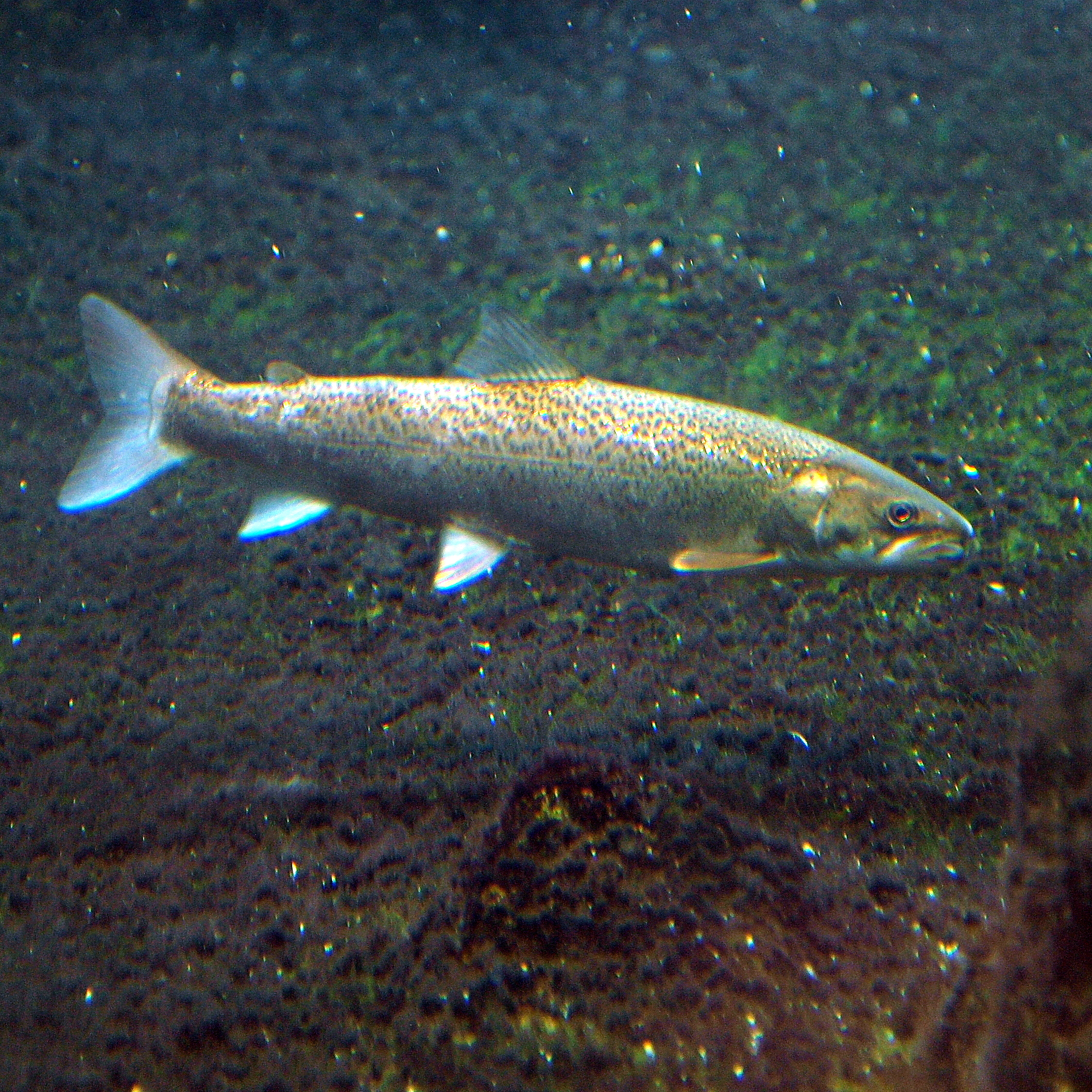
Sakhalin taimen

- Family: Salmonidae
  - Genus: Hucho
    - Sakhalin taimen, Hucho perryi CR^{IUCN} (MoE: EN)
  - Genus: Oncorhynchus
    - Pink salmon, Oncorhynchus gorbuscha
    - Iwame trout, Oncorhynchus iwame DD^{IUCN} (endemic)
    - Kunimasu, Oncorhynchus kawamurae EW^{IUCN} (endemic) (MoE: EW)
    - Chum salmon, Oncorhynchus keta
    - Masu salmon, Oncorhynchus masou
      - Red-spotted masu salmon, O. m. ishikawae EN^{IUCN} (MoE: NT)
      - Cherry salmon, O. m. masou (MoE: NT)
    - Rainbow trout, Oncorhynchus mykiss (introduced)
    - Sockeye salmon, Oncorhynchus nerka LC^{IUCN} (MoE: CR)
    - Biwa trout, Oncorhynchus rhodurus
  - Genus: Salmo
    - Brown trout, Salmo trutta LC^{IUCN} (introduced)
  - Genus: Salvelinus
    - Brook trout, Salvelinus fontinalis (introduced)
    - Kirikuchi char, Salvelinus japonicus EN^{IUCN} (endemic)
    - White-spotted charr, Salvelinus leucomaenis
      - Head-spotted charr, S. l. imbrius (MoE: VU)
      - Japanese charr, S. l. japonicus
      - Amemasu, S. l. leucomaenis
      - Nikkō-iwana, S. l. pluvius (MoE: DD)
    - Dolly Varden trout, Salvelinus malma
      - Oshorokoma, S. m. krascheninnikovi (MoE: VU)
      - Northern Dolly Varden, S. m. malma
      - Miyabe charr, S. m. miyabei (MoE: VU)
    - Lake trout, Salvelinus namaycush (introduced)

== Order: Scorpaeniformes ==
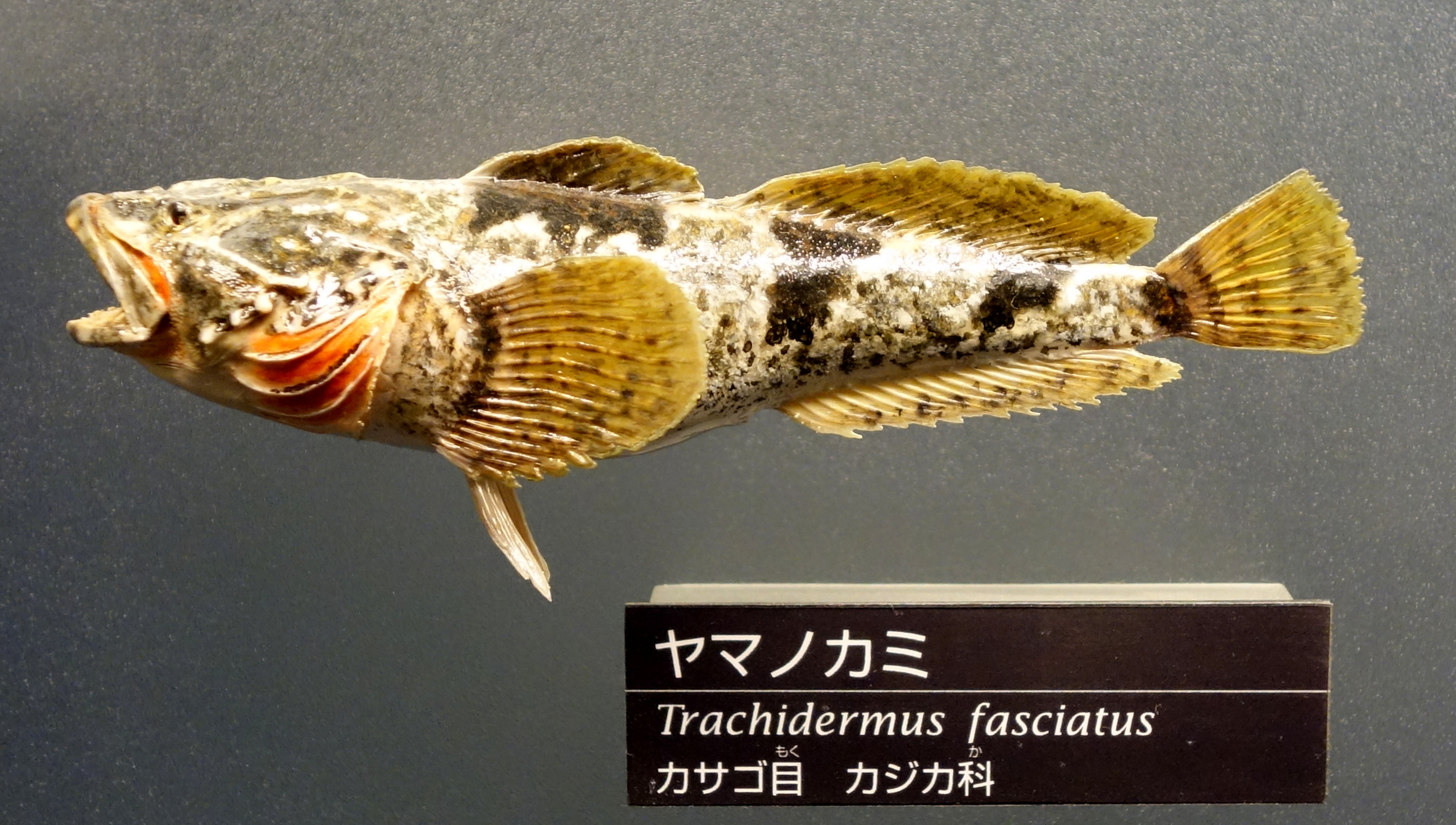
Roughskin sculpin

- Family: Cottidae
  - Genus: Cottus
    - Sakhalin sculpin, Cottus amblystomopsis LC^{IUCN}
    - Cherskii's sculpin, Cottus czerskii LC^{IUCN}
    - Tyuman-river sculpin, Cottus hangiongensis
    - Fourspine sculpin, Cottus kazika LC^{IUCN} (endemic) (MoE: VU)
    - Wrinklehead sculpin, Cottus nozawae LC^{IUCN}
    - Japanese fluvial sculpin, Cottus pollux LC^{IUCN} (endemic) (MoE: NT)
    - Kajika small-egg-type, Cottus reinii LC^{IUCN} (endemic) (MoE: EN)
  - Genus: Trachidermus
    - Roughskin sculpin, Trachidermus fasciatus (MoE: EN)
- Family: Tetrarogidae
  - Genus: Tetraroge
    - Bearded roguefish, Tetraroge barbata LC^{IUCN} (MoE: CR)
    - Freshwater waspfish, Tetraroge nigra LC^{IUCN} (MoE: CR)
- Family: Triglidae
  - Genus: Chelidonichthys
    - Bluefin gurnard, Chelidonichthys kumu LC^{IUCN}

== Order: Siluriformes ==
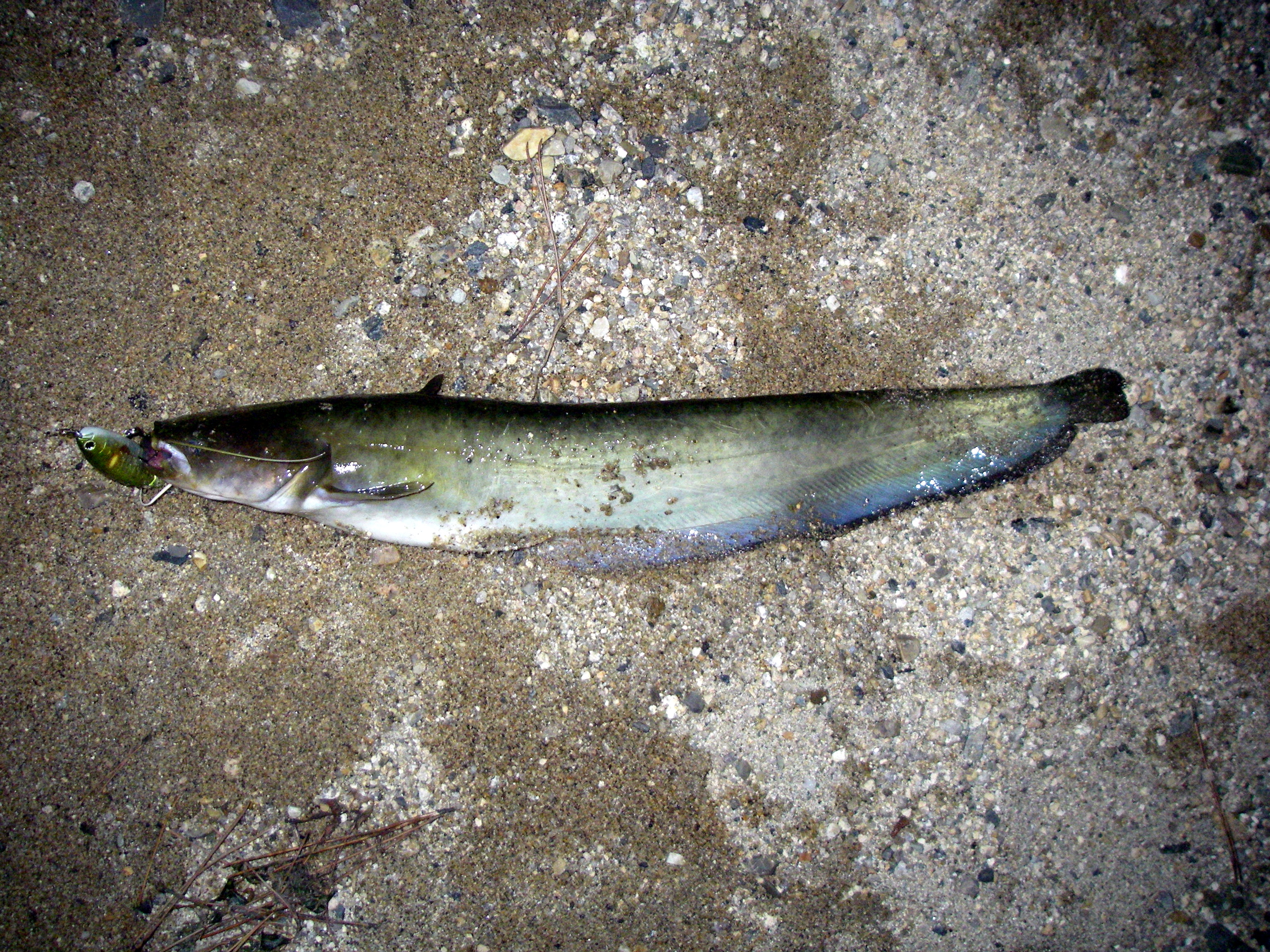
Amur catfish

- Family: Amblycipitidae
  - Genus: Liobagrus
    - Reddish bullhead, Liobagrus reinii LC^{IUCN} (endemic) (MoE: VU)
- Family: Bagridae
  - Genus: Leiocassis
    - Chinese longsnout catfish, Leiocassis longirostris DD^{IUCN}
  - Genus: Tachysurus
    - Ariake cuttailed bullhead, Tachysurus aurantiacus NT^{IUCN} (endemic) (MoE: VU)
    - Korean bullhead, Tachysurus fulvidraco LC^{IUCN} (introduced)
    - Stumpy bullhead, Tachysurus ichikawai VU^{IUCN} (endemic) (MoE: EN)
    - Forktail bullhead, Tachysurus nudiceps
    - Cuttailed bullhead, Tachysurus tokiensis LC^{IUCN} (endemic) (MoE: VU)
- Family: Clariidae
  - Genus: Clarias
    - Walking catfish, Clarias batrachus LC^{IUCN} (introduced)
    - Hong Kong catfish, Clarias fuscus LC^{IUCN} (introduced)
- Family: Ictaluridae
  - Genus: Ictalurus
    - Channel catfish, Ictalurus punctatus LC^{IUCN} (introduced)
- Family: Loricariidae
  - Genus: Pterygoplichthys
    - Vermiculated sailfin catfish, Pterygoplichthys disjunctivus (introduced on Okinawa Island)
- Family: Siluridae
  - Genus: Silurus
    - Amur catfish, Silurus asotus LC^{IUCN}
    - Lake Biwa catfish, Silurus biwaensis
    - Biwa rock catfish, Silurus lithophilus VU^{IUCN} (endemic) (MoE: NT)

== Order: Synbranchiformes ==
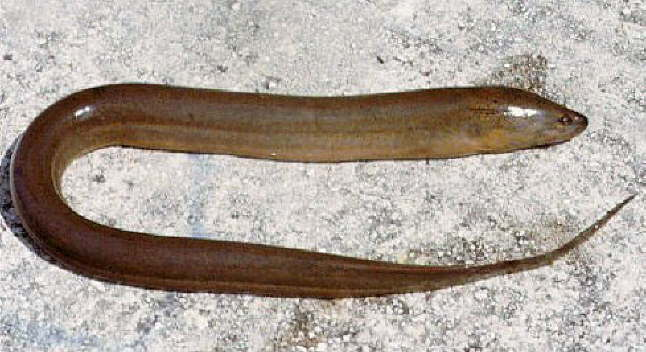
Asian swamp eel

- Family: Synbranchidae
  - Genus: Monopterus
    - Asian swamp eel, Monopterus albus LC^{IUCN}
    - Oriental swamp eel, Monopterus javanensis LC^{IUCN}

== Order: Syngnathiformes ==
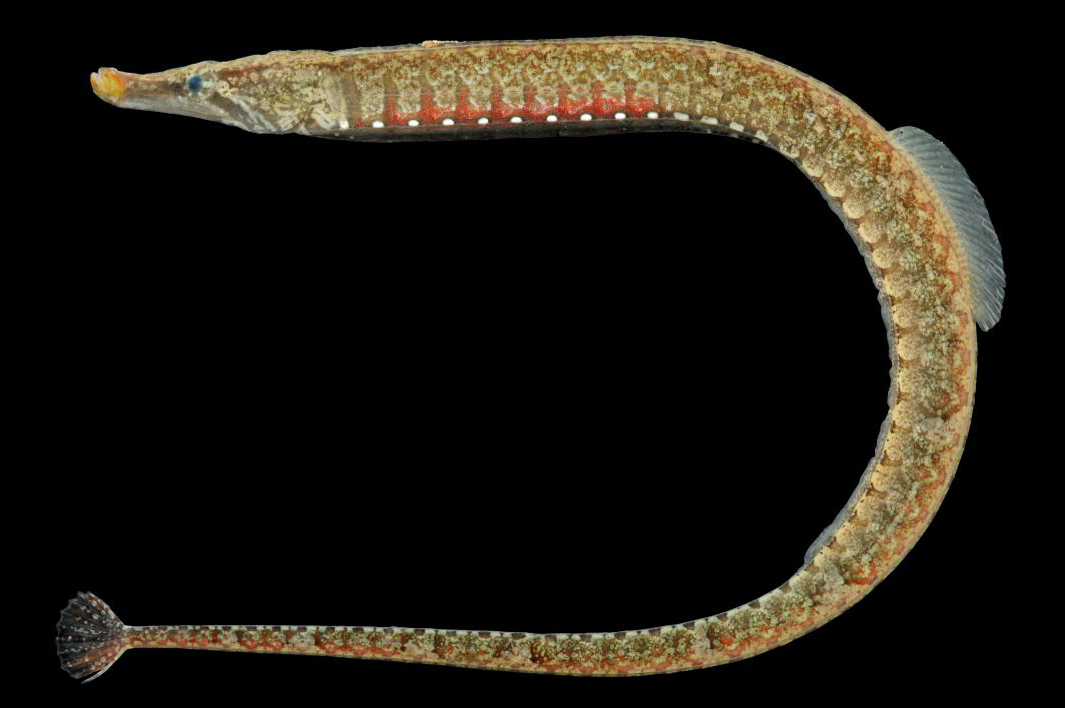
Reticulated freshwater pipefish

- Family: Syngnathidae
  - Genus: Hippichthys
    - Bluespeckled pipefish, Hippichthys cyanospilos LC^{IUCN}
    - Reticulated freshwater pipefish, Hippichthys heptagonus LC^{IUCN} (MoE: EN)
    - Beady pipefish, Hippichthys penicillus LC^{IUCN}
    - Bellybarred pipefish, Hippichthys spicifer LC^{IUCN}
  - Genus: Microphis
    - Flat-nosed pipefish, Microphis argulus LC^{IUCN} (MoE: CR)
    - Short-tailed pipefish, Microphis brachyurus LC^{IUCN}
    - Philippine river pipefish, Microphis jagorii DD^{IUCN} (MoE: CR)
    - Barhead pipefish, Microphis leiaspis LC^{IUCN}
    - Ragged-tail pipefish, Microphis retzii LC^{IUCN} (MoE: CR)
  - Genus: Syngnathus
    - Pacific seaweed pipefish, Syngnathus schlegeli LC^{IUCN}

== Order: Tetraodontiformes ==
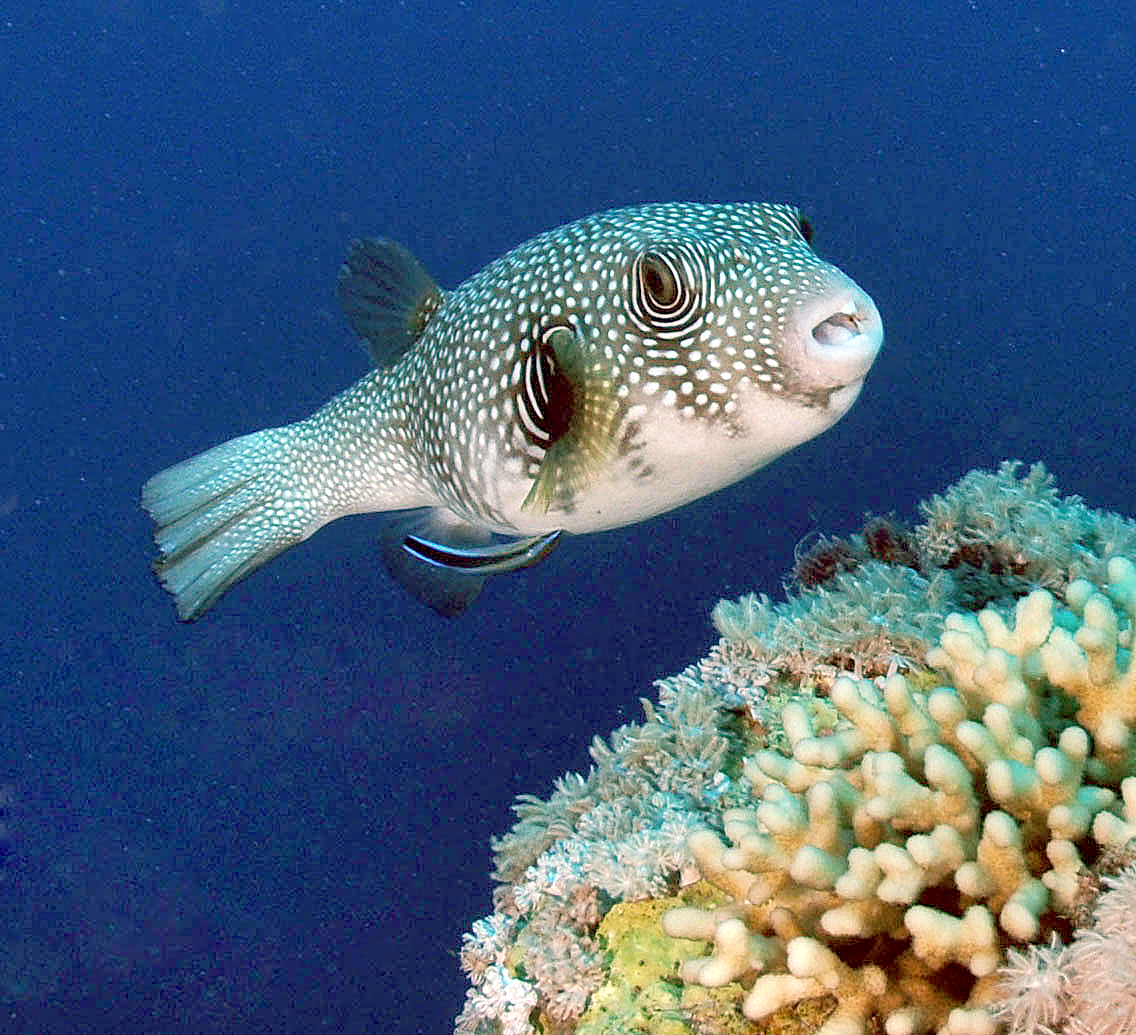
White-spotted puffer

- Family: Tetraodontidae
  - Genus: Arothron
    - White-spotted puffer, Arothron hispidus LC^{IUCN}
    - Immaculate puffer, Arothron immaculatus LC^{IUCN}
  - Genus: Chelonodon
    - Milkspotted puffer, Chelonodon patoca LC^{IUCN}
  - Genus: Lagocephalus
    - Silver-cheeked toadfish, Lagocephalus sceleratus LC^{IUCN}
  - Genus: Takifugu
    - Grass puffer, Takifugu alboplumbeus LC^{IUCN}
    - Ocellated puffer, Takifugu ocellatus NT^{IUCN}
    - Obscure puffer, Takifugu obscurus LC^{IUCN}
    - Finepatterned puffer, Takifugu poecilonotus LC^{IUCN}

== Japanese names ==
Incorporating new species described and other taxonomic changes since the 2013 third edition of Fishes of Japan (日本産魚類検索), edited by Nakabo Tetsuji, Motomura Hiroyuki (本村浩之) of the Kagoshima University Museum published in 2020 List of Japan's All Fish Species (日本産魚類全種目録), subtitled "Current standard Japanese and scientific names of all fish species recorded from Japanese waters"; regular open access updates are published, that of July 2021 detailing some 4,611 species.

== See also ==
- List of animals in Japan
- Wildlife Protection Areas in Japan
