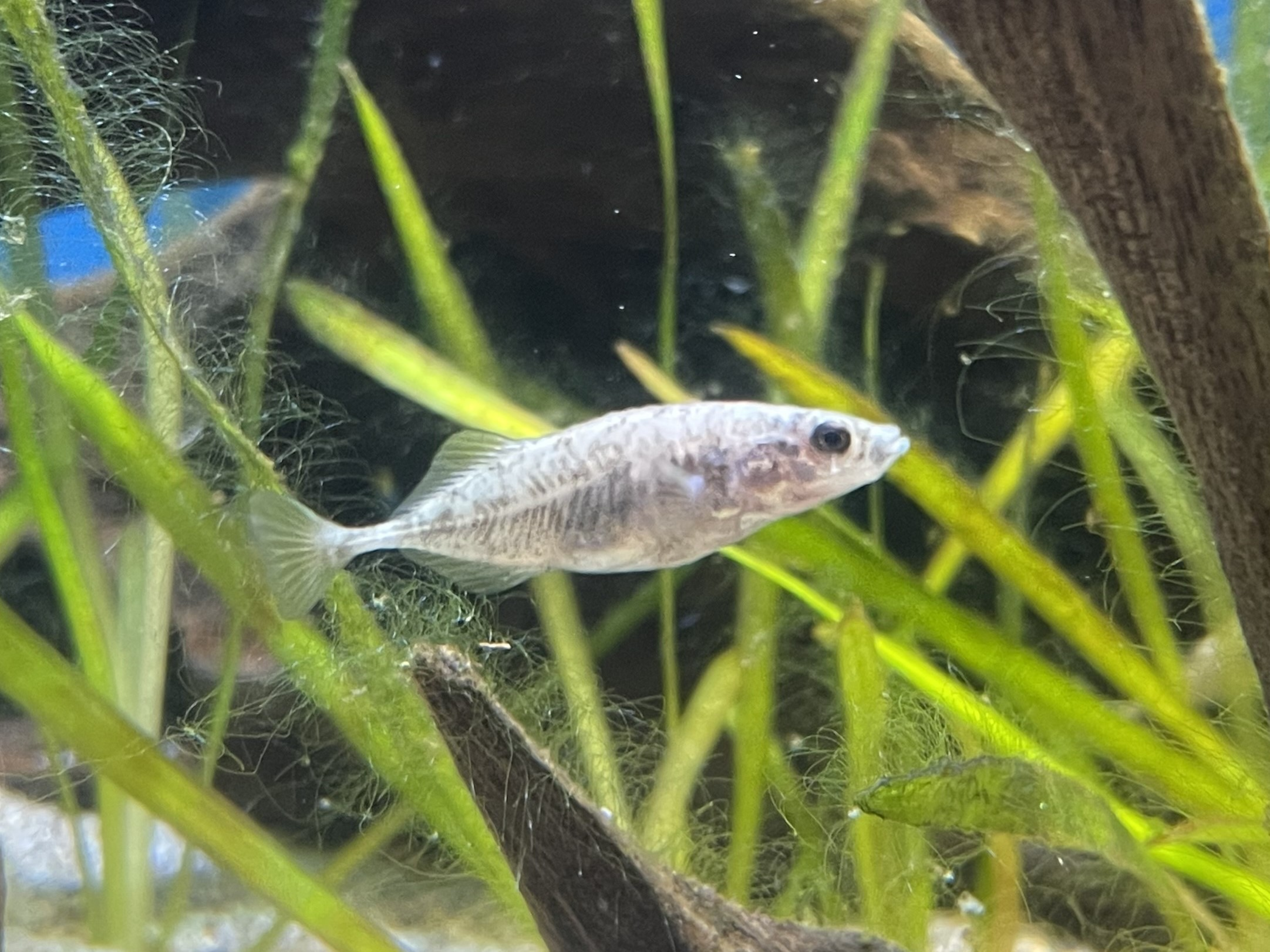

Scientific classification
- Kingdom: Animalia
- Phylum: Chordata
- Class: Actinopterygii
- Order: Perciformes
- Family: Gasterosteidae
- Genus: Pungitius
- Species: P. nakamurai

Binomial name
- Pungitius nakamurai Matsumoto & Matsuura, 2026

= Musashi ninespine stickleback =

Species of fish

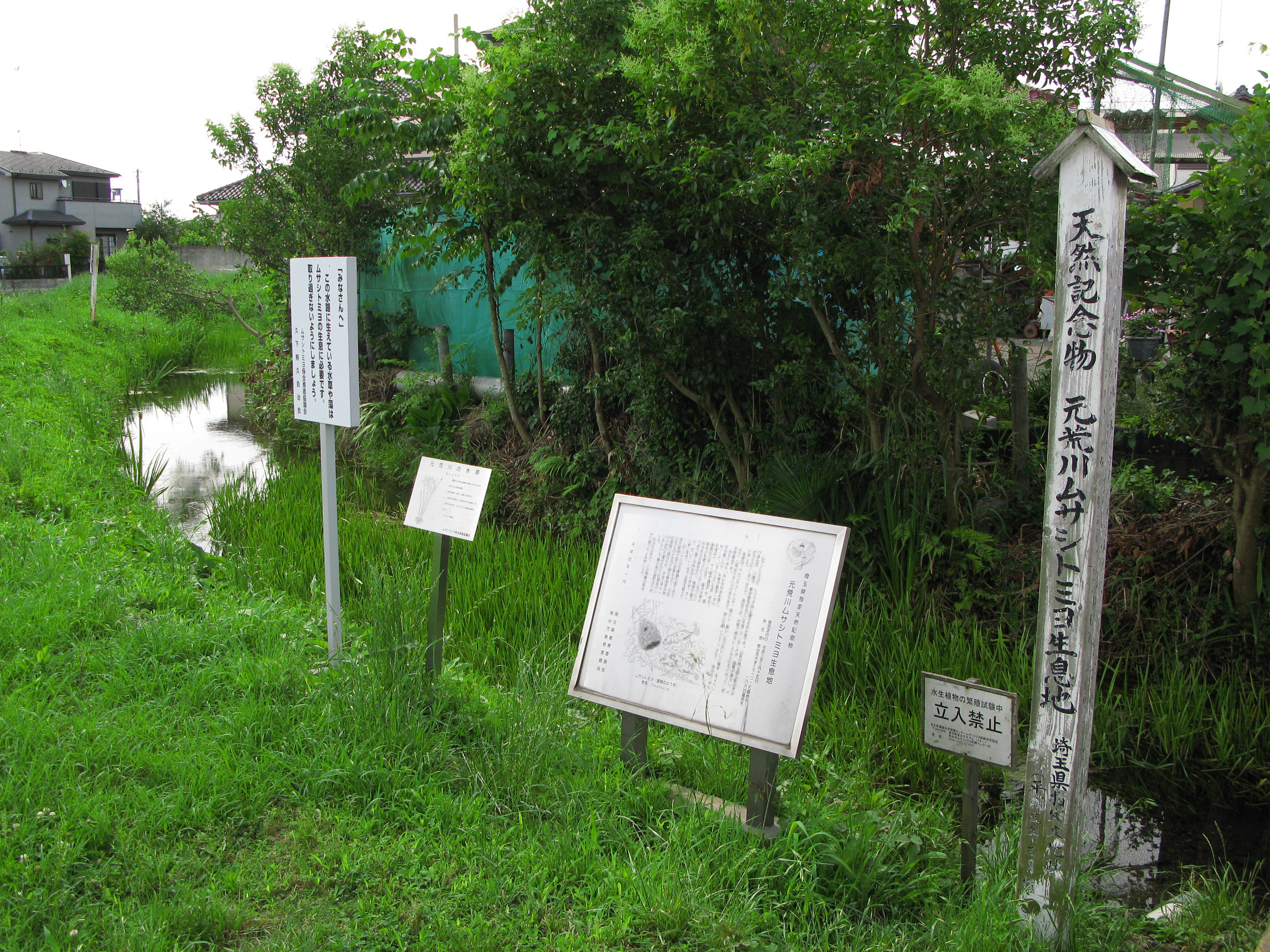
Native habitat near the source of the Motoara River

The Musashi ninespine stickleback (Pungitius nakamurai) is a species of fish in the stickleback genus Pungitius. Endemic to Japan, reported in 1963 and named in 2026. It occurs only in the Motoara River in Kumagaya, Saitama Prefecture (old Musashi Province). It is the prefectural fish, its habitat has been designated a prefectural natural monument, and a main belt asteroid, the minor planet 10776 Musashitomiyo, has been named in its honour. It is assessed as Critically Endangered on the 2020 Ministry of the Environment Red List.

== Gallery ==
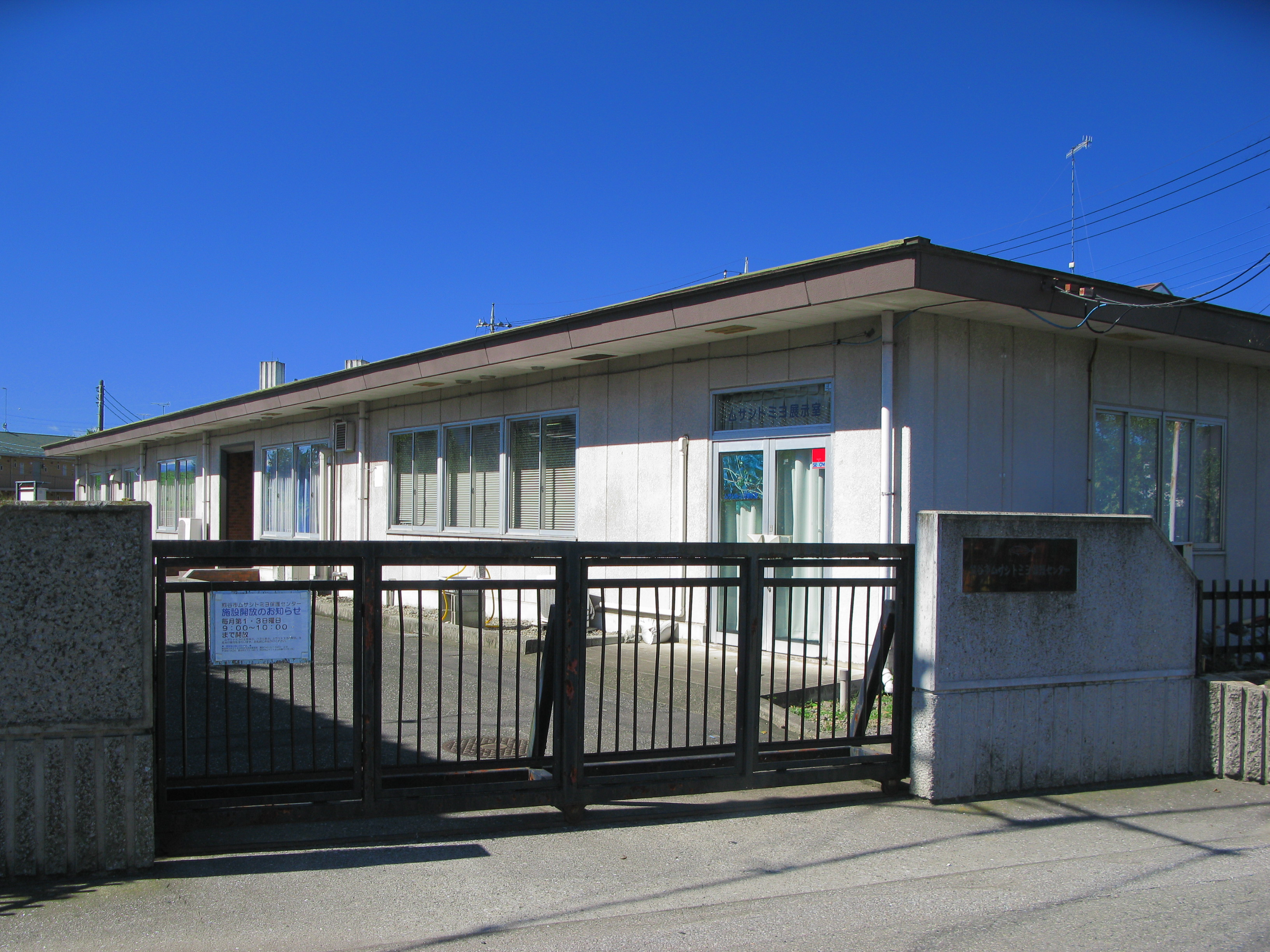
Musashitomiyo Conservation Center

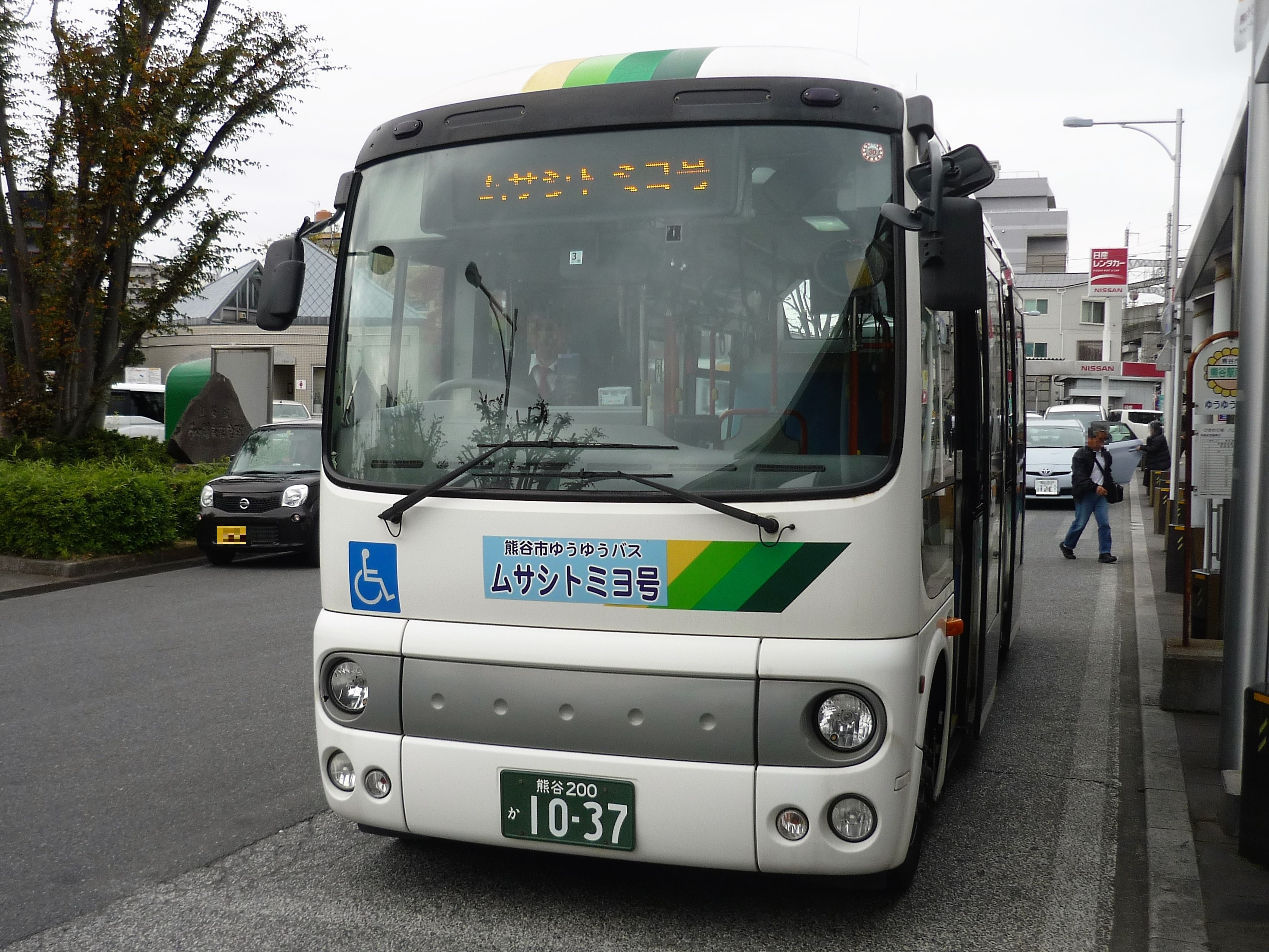
Musashi-tomiyo bus

== See also ==
- List of freshwater fish of Japan
- Meanings of minor planet names: 10001–11000
