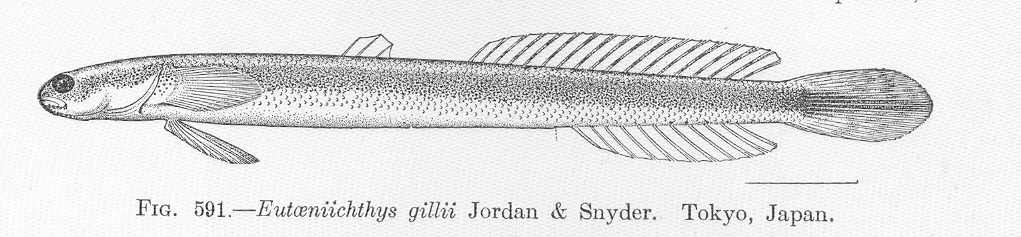

Scientific classification
- Kingdom: Animalia
- Phylum: Chordata
- Class: Actinopterygii
- Order: Gobiiformes
- Family: Oxudercidae
- Subfamily: Gobionellinae
- Genus: Eutaeniichthys
- Species: E. gilli

Binomial name
- Eutaeniichthys gilli D. S. Jordan & Snyder, 1901

= Eutaeniichthys =

Species of fish

Eutaeniichthys gilli is a species of goby native to brackish waters of the northwestern Pacific Ocean from around Japan, the Korean Peninsula and the Yellow Sea. It is an inhabitant of estuarine tide pools where it can be found under rocks. This species grows to a length of 4 centimetres (1.6 in) SL. This species is the only known member of its genus. The generic name is a compound of eu meaning "good", taenia meaning "ribbon" or "tape", Eutaenia being a synonym of the garter snake genus Thamnophis, and ichthys, "fish". The specific name honours the American ichthyologist Theodore Gill (1837-1914) for his work on the gobies of Japan.
