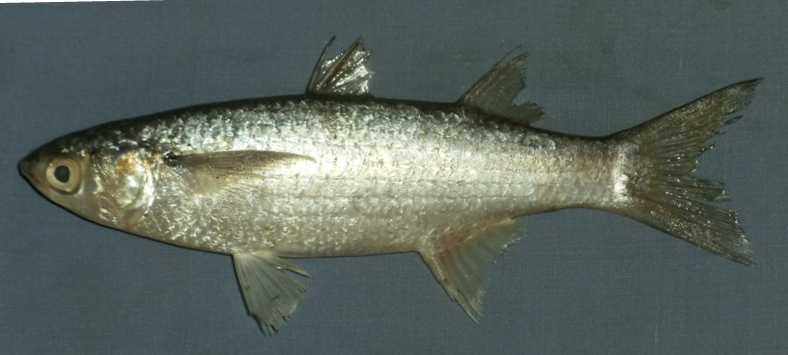
- Osteomugil cunnesius

Scientific classification
- Kingdom: Animalia
- Phylum: Chordata
- Class: Actinopterygii
- Division: Teleostei
- Order: Mugiliformes
- Family: Mugilidae
- Genus: Osteomugil; Luther, 1982

Type species
- Mugil cunnesius Valenciennes, 1836

= Osteomugil =

Genus of ray-finned fishes

Osteomugil is a genus of mugilid mullets found in coastal waters of the Indo-Pacific, including estuaries and rivers. They were formerly included in Moolgarda and Valamugil.

== Species ==
There are currently four recognized species in this genus:

- Osteomugil engeli (Bleeker, 1858) (Kanda)
- Osteomugil perusii (Valenciennes, 1836) (Longfinned mullet)
- Osteomugil robustus (Günther, 1861) (Robust mullet)
- Osteomugil speigleri (Bleeker, 1858) (Speigler's mullet)
