= Greenback gauvina =

Conservation status
- Least Concern (IUCN 3.1)

Scientific classification
- Kingdom: Animalia
- Phylum: Chordata
- Class: Actinopterygii
- Division: Teleostei
- Order: Gobiiformes
- Family: Eleotridae
- Genus: Bunaka; Herre, 1927
- Species: B. gyrinoides

Binomial name
- Bunaka gyrinoides (Bleeker, 1853)

Synonyms
- Eleotris gyrinoides Bleeker, 1853; Guavina gyrinoides (Bleeker, 1853); Oxyeleotris gyrinoides (Bleeker, 1853); Bunaka pinguis Herre, 1927; Lizettea pelewensis Herre, 1936; Bunaka pelewensis (Herre, 1936); Boroda francoi Roxas & Ablan, 1940; Bunaka sticta Herre, 1942

Species of fish

The greenback guavina (Bunaka gyrinoides), or greenback gudgeon, is a species of amphidromous ray-finned fish belonging to the family Eleotridae, the spinycheek sleepers or bullies. This species is found in south and southeast Asia, Melanesia, Micronesia and Australia. It is the only species in the genus Bunaka.

== Taxonomy ==
The greenback guavina was first formally described as Eleotris gyrinoides in 1853 by the Ditch physician, herpetologist and ichthyologist Pieter Bleeker with its type locality given as Bengkulu and Pariaman, Indonesia. In 1927 Albert William Herre described Bunaka pinguis from the Philippines and classified it in the new genus Bunaka, designating it as the type species, it was also the type species by monotypy. B. pinguis is now regeraded as a synonym of E. gyrinoides. This taxon is classified in the family Eleotridae which is classified within the suborder Gobioidei, the gobies, of the order Gobiiformes, which also includes the cardinalfishes and sand divers.

== Etymology ==
The greenback guavina is the only species in the genus Bunaka, this is a name for this fish in the Negrito language. The specific name gyrinoides, suffixes -oides, which is Neo-Latin and means "form" or "shape", onto gyrī́nos, which means "tadpole". Herre did not explain what this referred to but it is thought it may be to the round cross section of the anterior part of the body becoming laterally compressed posteriorly.

== Description ==
The greenback guavina has a fusiform body and it reaches a maximum standard length of 34 cm (13 in), although 15 cm (5.9 in) is more typical. The fisry dorsal fin is supported by 6 spines, the second dosral fin is supported by 1 spine and 8 soft rays as is the anal fin. This species has a robust body, cylindrical in cross section with a flattened head and large, slightly oblique mouth. It has pointed teeth in its jaws. The colour of this fish varies to match their habitat. It is typically dark brown to orange with clear spotting on the pelvic and anal fins, frequently with thin dark lines, one on each scale row. There are pale brown blotches arranged in broken bars on the sides and irregular pale brown blotches on the head and the lips.

== Distribution and habitat ==
The greenback guavina is found in southern India and Sri Lanka, the Andaman Islands, southern Thailand but apparently not Western Malaysia, Singapore, Hong Kong, Indonesia, Brunei, Eastern Malaysia, Timore-Leste, Philippines. Taiwan, Papua New Guinea, Queensland, Solomon Islands, New Caledonia, Vanuatu, Fiji, Palau and the Federated States of Micronesia. This fish is found in the lower reaches of small shallow rivers and streams, including estuaries. It may be found upstream in pure fresh water and often in faster-flowing water than do other related taxa. The greenback gudgeon occurs on substrates of mud, rocks, gravel and sand, and is frequently found in woody debris and leaf litter, in areas where it can readily find cover,

== Biology ==
The greenback guavina is an amphidromous species which is thought to have a pelagic, marine larval stage. The benthic eggs are laid in freshwater. This is a predatory species, its main prey is gastropods although it probably also eats smaller fishes and larger crustaceans.
