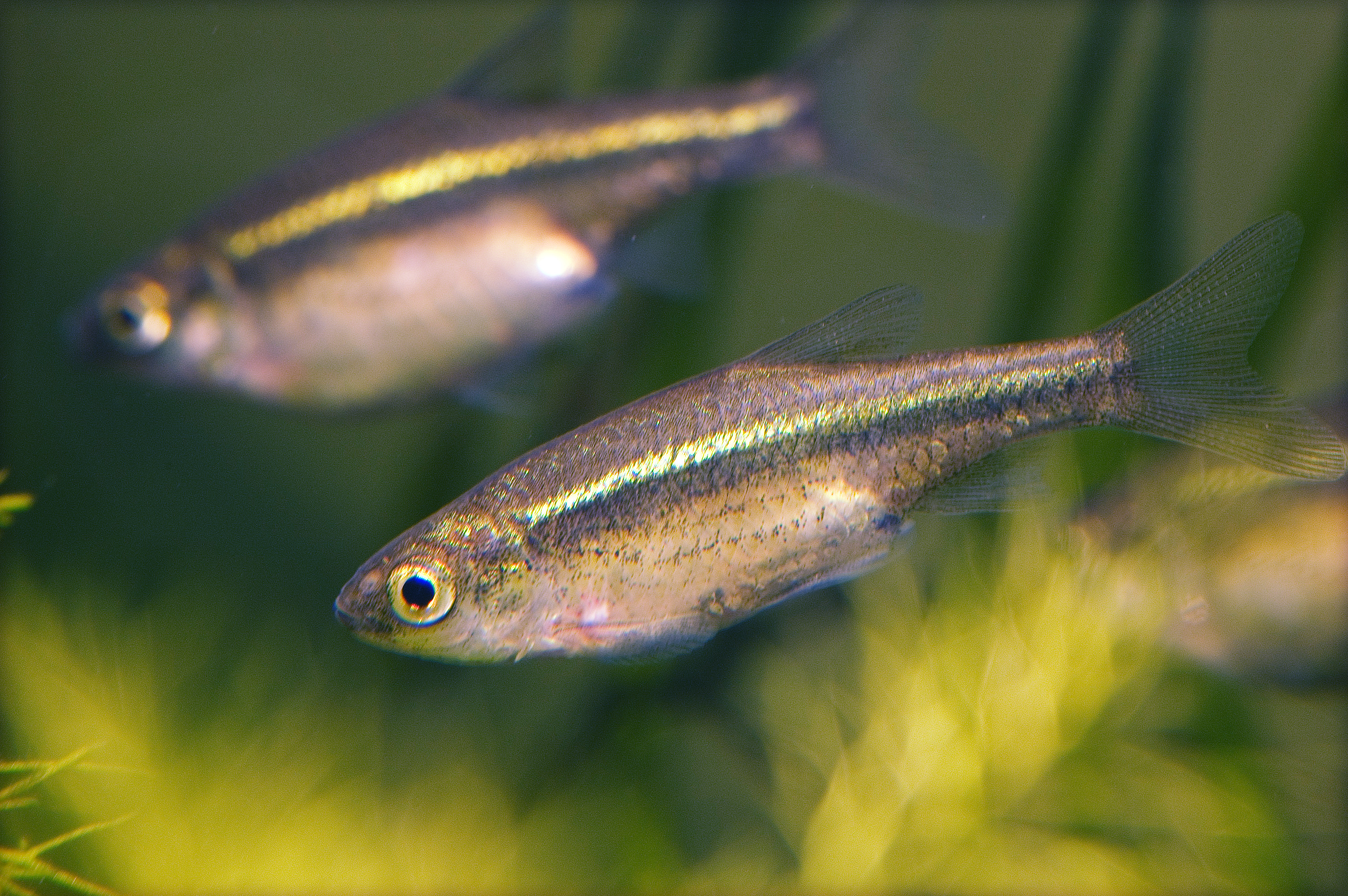

Conservation status
- Least Concern (IUCN 3.1)

Scientific classification
- Kingdom: Animalia
- Phylum: Chordata
- Class: Actinopterygii
- Order: Cypriniformes
- Family: Xenocyprididae
- Genus: Hemigrammocypris; Fowler, 1910
- Species: H. neglecta

Binomial name
- Hemigrammocypris neglecta Stieler, 1907

Synonyms
- Genus: Brevigobio Tanaka, 1916; Species: Hemigrammocypris rasborella Fowler, 1910; Brevigobio kawabatae Tanaka, 1916; Barilius neglectus (Stieler, 1907)

= Hemigrammocypris =

Species of fish

Hemigrammocypris is a monospecific genus of freshwater ray-finned fish belonging to the family Xenocyprididae, the East Asian minnows or sharpbellies. The only species in the genus is Hemigrammocypris neglecta, the golden venus chub, which is endemic to the islands of Honshu, Shikoku and Kyushu in Japan. It is found widely in lowland habitats, including ditches and ponds. It is listed as endangered on the Japanese Red List. H. neglecta is the only species in its genus, but there are significant genetic differences between some populations, comparable to those generally seen between closely related species. It reaches up to 7 cm (2.8 in) in length, but typically is 4–5 cm (1.6–2.0 in). It is a short-lived species that typically reaches an age of about one year. It is listed as endangered in the Red List of Threatened Fishes of Japan.
