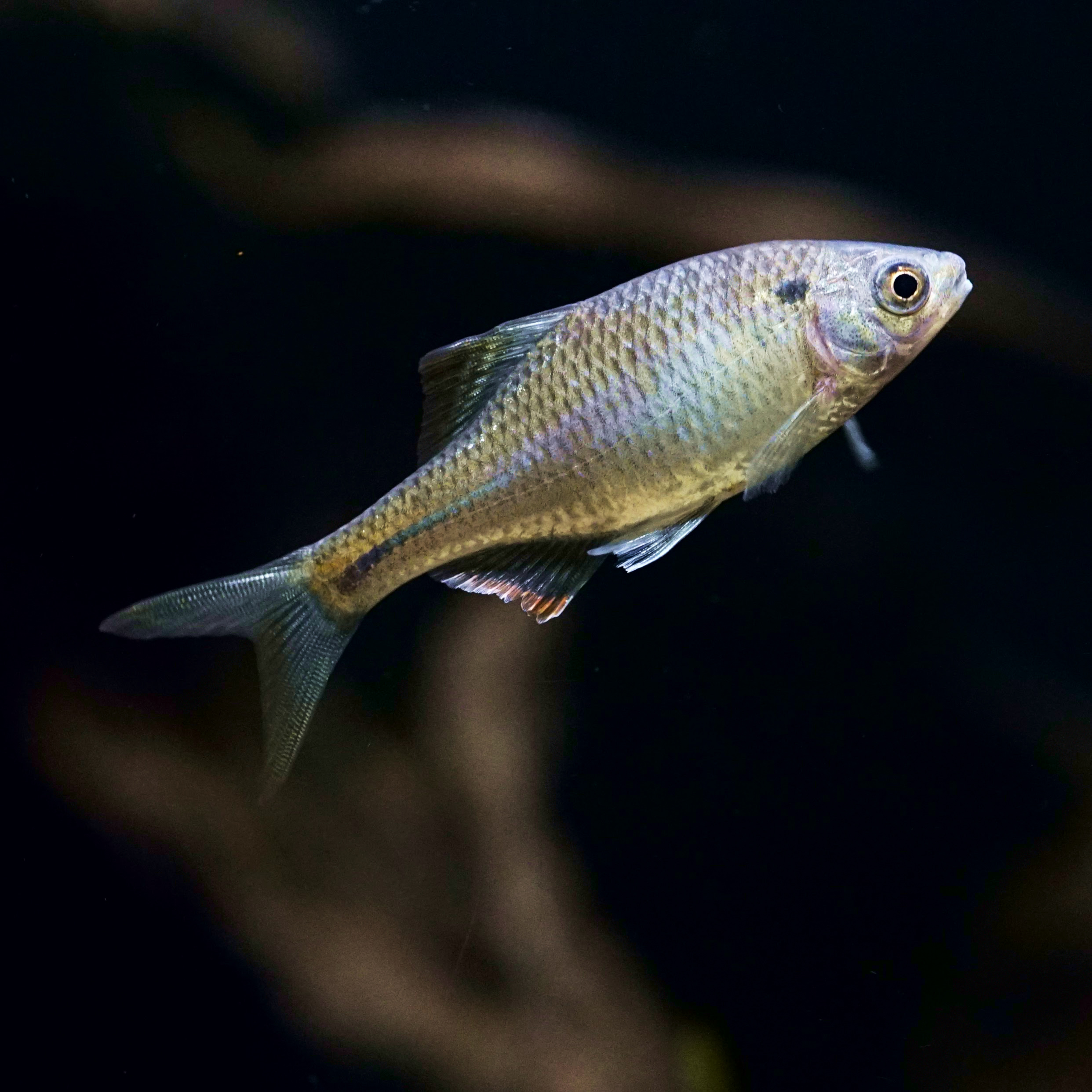

Conservation status
- Near Threatened (IUCN 3.1)

Scientific classification
- Kingdom: Animalia
- Phylum: Chordata
- Class: Actinopterygii
- Order: Cypriniformes
- Suborder: Cyprinoidei
- Family: Acheilognathidae
- Genus: Acheilognathus
- Species: A. tabira

Binomial name
- Acheilognathus tabira D. S. Jordan & W. F. Thompson, 1914

Synonyms
- Paracheilognathus tabira (D. S. Jordan & W. F. Thompson, 1914)

= Acheilognathus tabira =

Species of fish

Acheilognathus tabira, the Tabira bitterling, is a species of ray-finned fish in the genus Acheilognathus, a bitterling. The species is endemic to Japan.

== Subspecies ==
There are 5 subspecies in the species Acheilognathus tabira.

- Acheilognathus tabira erythropterus
- Acheilognathus tabira jordani
- Acheilognathus tabira nakamurae
- Acheilognathus tabira tabira
- Acheilognathus tabira tohokuensis
