= Bare-naped goby =

Conservation status
- Near Threatened (IUCN 3.1)

Scientific classification
- Kingdom: Animalia
- Phylum: Chordata
- Class: Actinopterygii
- Order: Gobiiformes
- Family: Oxudercidae
- Genus: Tomiyamia
- Species: T. nudicervica

Binomial name
- Tomiyamia nudicervica Tomiyama, 1934

Synonyms
- Tridentiger obscurus nudicervicus Tomiyama, 1934; Tridentiger nudicervicus Tomiyama, 1934

Species of fish

The bare-naped goby (Tomiyamia nudicervica) is a species of goby native to marine and brackish waters along the coasts of eastern Asia. This species can reach a length of 6 centimetres (2.4 in) TL.
