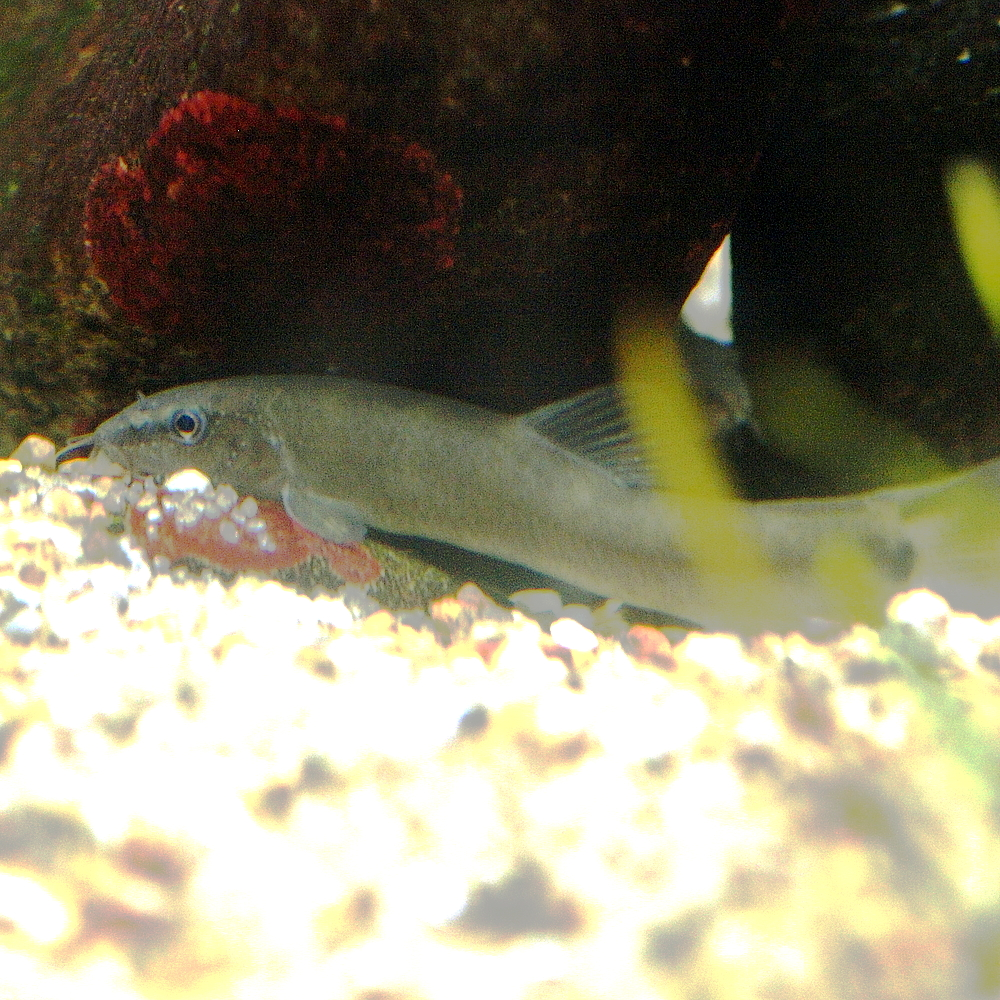

Conservation status
- Critically Endangered (IUCN 3.1)

Scientific classification
- Kingdom: Animalia
- Phylum: Chordata
- Class: Actinopterygii
- Division: Teleostei
- Order: Cypriniformes
- Family: Botiidae
- Genus: Parabotia
- Species: P. curtus

Binomial name
- Parabotia curtus (Temminck & Schlegel, 1846)

Synonyms
- Cobitis curta Temminck & Schlegel, 1846; Botia curta (Temminck & Schlegel, 1846); Capoeta curta (Temminck & Schlegel, 1846); Hymenophysa curta (Temminck & Schlegel, 1846); Leptobotia curta (Temminck & Schlegel, 1846)

= Ayumodoki =

Species of fish

The ayumodoki or kissing loach (Parabotia curtus) is a species of ray-finned fish in the family Botiidae. It is found in lakes and streams on Honshu, the largest island in Japan. Spawning grounds for kissing loach are ditches and small reservoirs for rice cultivation of a river system located in Japan. The kissing loach migrates to flooded areas, including paddy field areas, for spawning in early summer and the spawning of this species is limited after the formation of flooded areas over terrestrial vegetation. These flooded areas are the result of water from mountain streams and irrigation ponds flooding once dry land and creating man-made wetlands. As adults, Parabotia curtus migrate from these flooded paddy fields to fast moving, muddy streams and rivers like the Yodo River.

== Physical description ==
The kissing loach has an elongated body that is colored a deep dark brown dorsally with lighter brown vertical stripes extending down the sides. The head is compressed and is pointed in the front where six barbels are located on the underside of the head near the mouth. They have large gill openings, a moderately forked caudal fin with dark stripes, lobate pectoral fins, and a lateral line present starting close to the operculum and stretching to the base of the caudal fin.

== Early development ==
Tsukasa Abe and Tatsuya Sakamoto conducted a study which tested the early development of the kissing loach with special reference to the hatching at the early stage, as well as the movement of the larvae toward the water's surface. The bottoms of these areas, which are reported to be the spawning grounds for these fishes, are covered with vegetation submerged by irrigation water for rice cultivation during the spawning period in early summer. It is at this time "(spawning areas submerged for 39 days in 2005), the water depth at the spawning ground was 54.4 ± 0.4 cm [mean ± standard error (SE); 35 days], and the dissolved oxygen at the bottom and near the water surface (20 cm in depth) was measured at 1800 hours for 35 days with a water quality meter. The bottom water temperature was also measured hourly for 35 days using a data logger with a self-contained thermometer" (Abe & Sakamoto, 2011).

== Reproduction ==
Parabotia curtus only lay eggs once a year, and spawn in early summer in flooded areas like ditches or small reservoirs used to harvest rice. One of these spawning ground include paddy fields stemming from the Yoshii River in Okayama. They migrate from rivers like the Yoshii River in June and have to spawn very quickly since the flooded paddy fields and ditches are only flooded for a few days.

== Diet ==
When Parabotia curtus is young they are still in the paddy fields where they hatched, water fleas here are huge food source for both not Parabotia curtus and other juvenile fish hatched in these areas. Once juvenile loaches make their way to rivers and river channels, their suction mouths are fully developed and they scan the muddy river bottom for detritus, mud worms, and other macrofauna using the barbels that are located on the bottom and around their mouths.

== Conservation status ==
Current conservation status on Parabotia curtus is that it is listed on the International Union for the Conservation of Nature (IUCN) Red List as critically endangered. Land-use change and urbanization in Japan is expanding rapidly and is beginning to threaten important river ecosystems in Japan. Many environmental organizations have begun to work with government officials to try and expand these crucial ecosystems and to prevent urbanization and destruction of the few natural habitats left used for spawning for many species of fish, like the protected kissing loach.

In 2012 a plan to build a city park with a sports stadium was announced by the Kameoka city government. The developers of this city soon realized, after speaking with many environmental and conservational organizations, that the planned location of the stadium would destroy an important spawning ground for juvenile fish and by building the land up flooding in certain areas could occur. In 2016, they decided that it was best to move the location to avoid the destruction of the few remaining natural loach habitats left in Japan.
