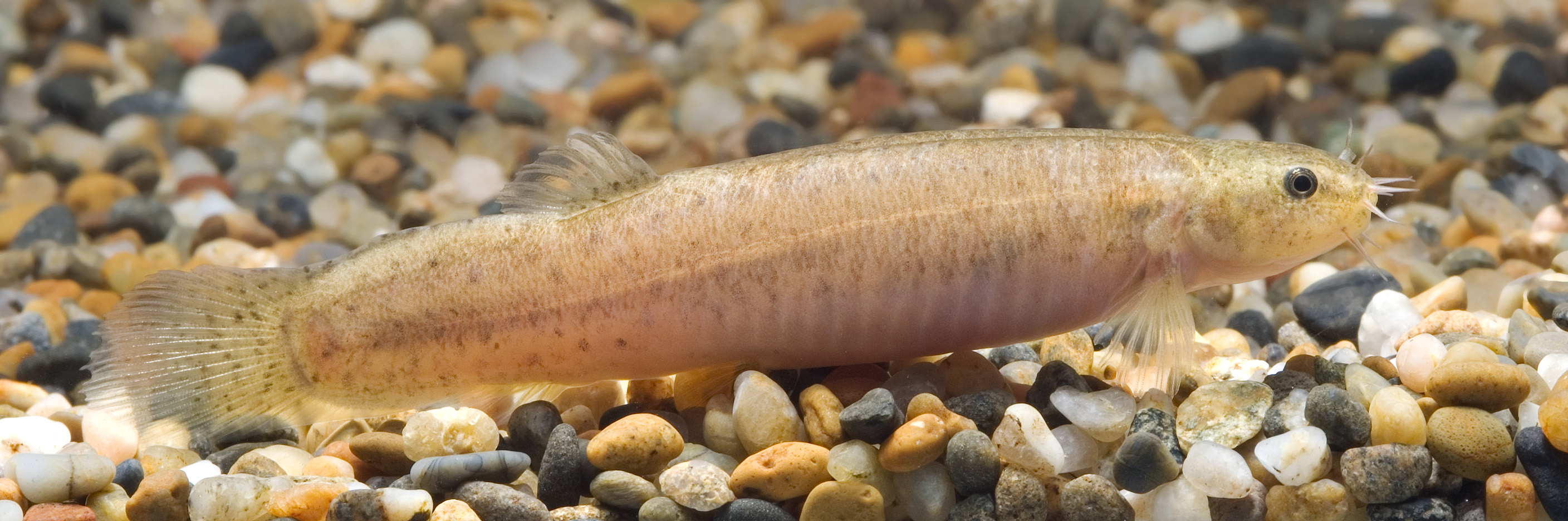
- Lefua echigonia

Scientific classification
- Kingdom: Animalia
- Phylum: Chordata
- Class: Actinopterygii
- Division: Teleostei
- Order: Cypriniformes
- Family: Nemacheilidae
- Genus: Lefua; Herzenstein, 1888

Type species
- Lefua pleskei Herzenstein, 1888

Synonyms
- Elxis Jordan & Fowler, 1903; Octonema Herzenstein, 1888

= Lefua =

Genus of fishes

Lefua is a genus of stone loaches native to East Asia. Members of this genus possess nostrils (usually one pair) and barbels around their mouths (usually 4 pairs, with one pair being directly anterior to the nostrils). They generally have column-shaped bodies and are good swimmers.

== Species ==
There are currently eight recognized species in this genus:

- Lefua costata (Kessler, 1876) (Eightbarbel loach, Continental eight barbeled loach)
- Lefua echigonia D. S. Jordan & R. E. Richardson, 1907 (Japanese eight barbeled loach)
- Lefua nikkonis (D. S. Jordan & Fowler, 1903) (ainu eight barbeled loach)
- Lefua nishimurai Katayama in' Katayama & Sawada, 2024
- Lefua pleskei (Herzenstein, 1888)
- Lefua sayu (Herre & S. Y. Lin, 1936)
- Lefua tokaiensis Hosoya, Ito & Miyazaki, 2019 (tokai stream eight barbeled loach)
- Lefua torrentis Hosoya, Ito & Miyazaki, 2018 (stream eight barbeled loach)
