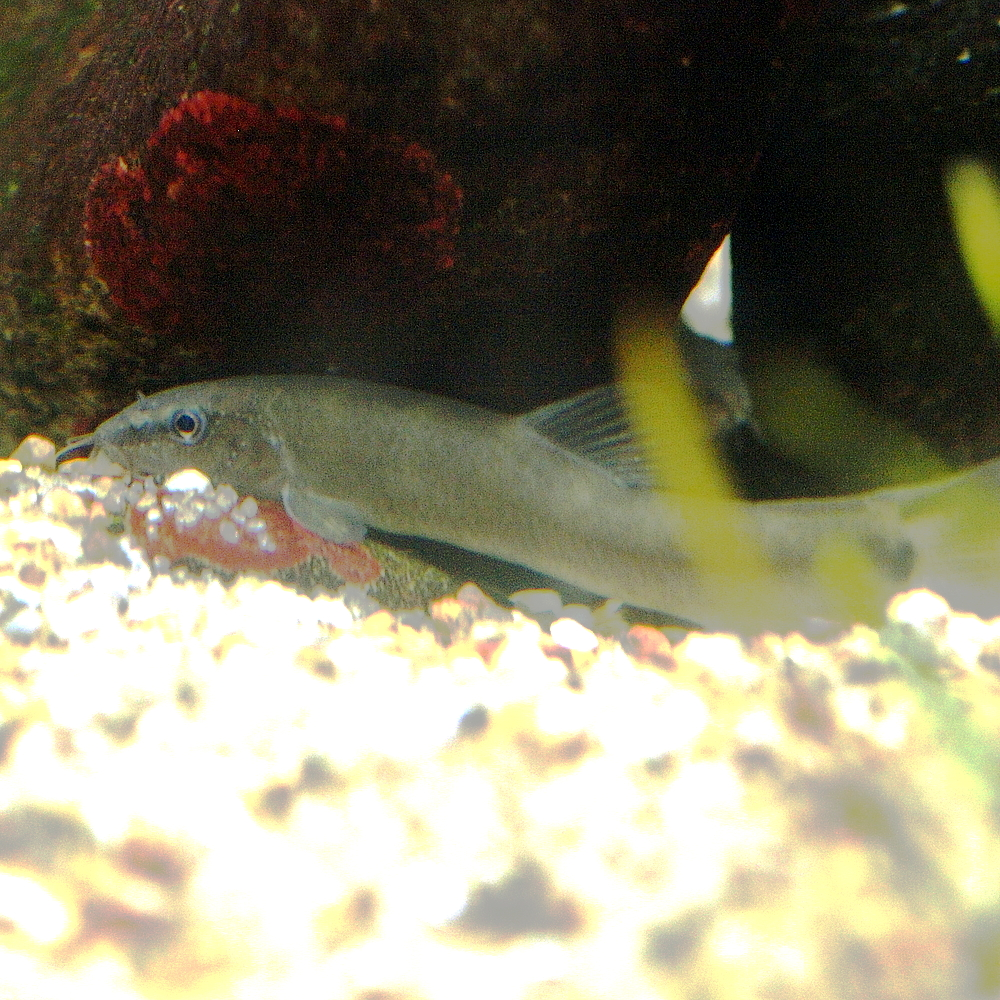
- Ayumodoki (P. curtus)

Scientific classification
- Kingdom: Animalia
- Phylum: Chordata
- Class: Actinopterygii
- Division: Teleostei
- Order: Cypriniformes
- Family: Botiidae
- Genus: Parabotia; Dabry de Thiersant, 1872

Type species
- Parabotia fasciatus Dabry de Thiersant ex Guichenot 1872

= Parabotia =

Genus of fishes

Parabotia is a genus of loaches. Most species in the genus are endemic to China, but P. curtus is from Japan, P. dubius is from Vietnam, and P. mantschuricus is from the Amur River basin.

== Species ==
There are currently 12 recognized species in this genus:

- Parabotia banarescui (Nalbant, 1965)
- Parabotia bimaculatus J. X. Chen, 1980
- Parabotia brevirostris D. G. Zhu & Y. Zhu, 2012
- Parabotia curtus (Temminck & Schlegel, 1846) (Ayumodoki, Kissing Loach)
- Parabotia dubius Kottelat, 2001
- Parabotia fasciatus Dabry de Thiersant, 1872
- Parabotia heterocheila Zhu & Chen, 2006
- Parabotia kiangsiensis R. L. Liu & Z. Z. Guo, 1986
- Parabotia lijiangensis J. X. Chen, 1980
- Parabotia maculosus (H. W. Wu, 1939)
- Parabotia mantschuricus (L. S. Berg, 1907) (Manchurian spiny loach)
- Parabotia parvus J. X. Chen, 1980

(Note that under nomenclatural rules, this genus must be considered as masculine even though all other genera ending in -botia are considered to be feminine. See reference for more information.)
