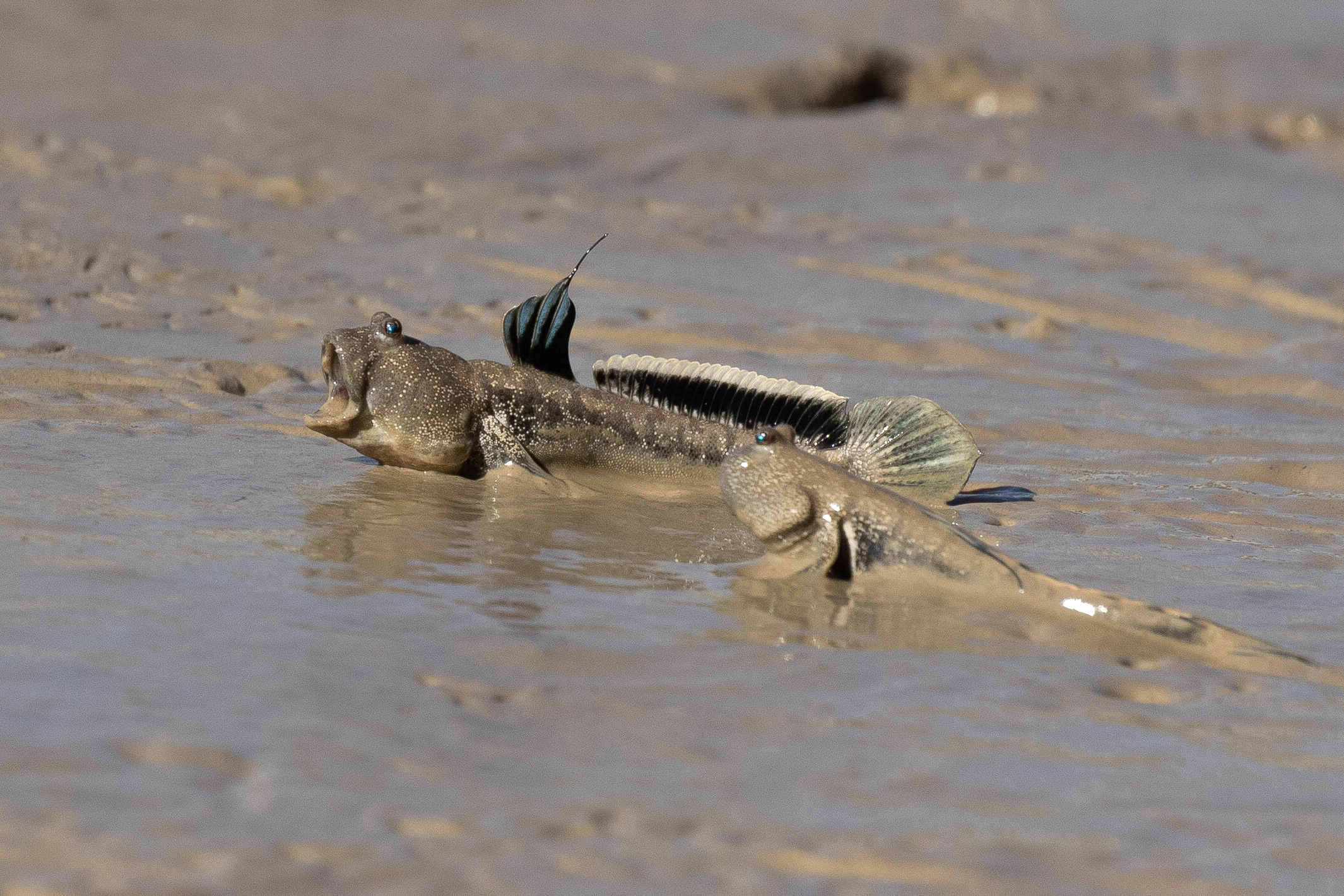
- Two Birdsong's mudskippers, one with raised dorsal fins and mouth agape in territorial display

Scientific classification
- Domain: Eukaryota
- Kingdom: Animalia
- Phylum: Chordata
- Class: Actinopterygii
- Order: Gobiiformes
- Family: Oxudercidae
- Genus: Boleophthalmus
- Species: B. birdsongi

Binomial name
- Boleophthalmus birdsongi Murdy, 1989

= Boleophthalmus birdsongi =

Species of mudskipper

Boleophthalmus birdsongi, also known as Birdsong's goggle-eyed goby, North Australian great mudskipper (from Chinese: 北澳洲大弹涂鱼), and Birdsong's mudskipper, is a species of mudskipper. It occurs in the mudflats of Northern Territory, Australia.

== Taxonomy ==
=== Etymology ===
The specific epithet birdsongi is derived from the surname of American ichthyologist Ray S. Birdsong, in honor of his work regarding gobioid osteology and systematics.

== Description ==
Boleophthalmus birdsongi have a cylindrical head of similar width and depth, compressed body, and subterminal (downward-turned) mouth. Its nape and body are covered with cycloid scales. They have 49 upper jaw teeth, including 2–3 teeth twice the size of the others on either side of the symphysis, and 51 lower jaw teeth, which are compressed and about the same size. The largest specimen of B. birdsongi caught in a study of Australian mudskipper species was 115 millimetres (4.5 in) in standard length and 138 millimetres (5.4 in) in total length.

=== Colouration ===
Individuals of B. birdsongi are brown in colour on their head and dorsal (top) side, while the ventral (belly) side of their body and head is yellow. Individuals have a black stripe along their lateral line. Females have further dark markings that extend dorsally from the stripe: two blotches partially covered by the pectoral fin, a stripe between the first (D1) and second (D2) dorsal fins, and four stripes beneath D2. D1 is blackened proximally (where it meets the body) and is whitish distally (furthest from the body). D2 is proximally white and distally off-white, with a dark stripe down the middle. The caudal fin is greyish black. The pelvic fins are dusky. The pectoral fin is covered with numerous small white spots, and the fin base and fin rays are dusky. There are also small white spots on the gill cover, and some spots on the cheek.

Juveniles are entirely grey with vertical bars of dark brown, but lack the lateral line stripe.

=== Similar species ===
Boleophthalmus birdsongi is the only species of its genus to have a lateral line stripe and lack a lower jaw teeth notch. Compared to the only other Boleophthalmus species to occur in Australia, Boleophthalmus caeruleomaculatus, B. birdsongi is lighter in colouration and has less second dorsal fin and anal fin elements. Additionally, B. birdsongi reaches a smaller maximum size than B. caeruleomaculatus. Their dorsal fins are coloured differently than the blue-spotted grey dorsal fins of B. caeruleomaculatus, plus B. birdsongi's first dorsal fin has shorter spines.

== Habitat and distribution ==
Boleophthalmus birdsongi is endemic to Northern Territory, Australia, where it occurs in mudflat habitats.

Similar to Boleophthalmus boddarti, smaller individuals of B. birdsongi occur at higher intertidal zone levels than larger individuals do, moving landwards during the spring tides, when the difference between high and low tide is at its maximum, and towards the sea during neap tides, when the difference is at its minimum. Adults and juveniles experience habitat separation, where adults inhabit areas of mud or muddy sand that can be level or sloping, as well as either smooth or irregular, at these low intertidal zone heights, while juveniles, 22–66 millimetres (0.87–2.60 in) in length, inhabit muddy areas that are level and smooth at these highest intertidal height.

== Behavior ==
Like other Boleophthalmus species, adults maintain burrows in the mudflat substrate to hide in when threatened and reside in when covered by the tide. Adults are also territorial, and perform aggression displays to keep perceived threats and other individuals away from their territory.

=== Diet ===
Feeding behavior of Boleophthalmus birdsongi has been observed to be similar to others species of the Boleophthalmus genus. Individuals move their head side to side on the surface of exposed mudflats during low tide, likely to graze on algae and diatoms.

=== Reproduction ===
Boleophthalmus birdsongi have been observed to perform courtship displays during August and November.

== Conservation and status ==
The conservation status of Boleophthalmus birdsongi has not been evaluated. Based on models, Boleophthalmus birdsongi has been estimated to be at low risk from fishing.
