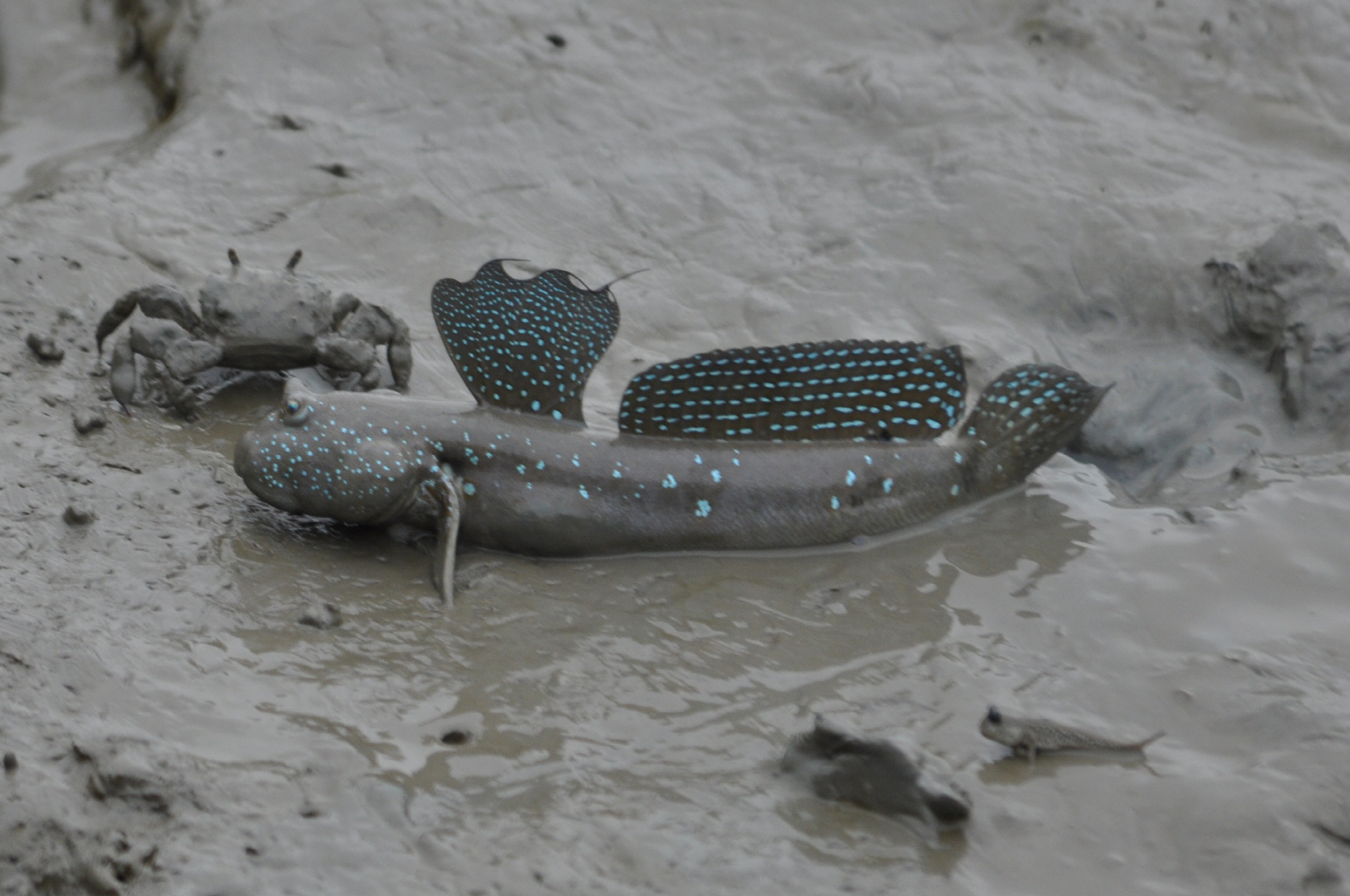

Scientific classification
- Kingdom: Animalia
- Phylum: Chordata
- Class: Actinopterygii
- Division: Teleostei
- Order: Gobiiformes
- Family: Oxudercidae
- Genus: Boleophthalmus
- Species: B. pectinirostris

Binomial name
- Boleophthalmus pectinirostris (Linnaeus, 1758)

Synonyms
- Gobius pectinirostris (Linnaeus, 1758)

= Boleophthalmus pectinirostris =

Species of fish

Boleophthalmus pectinirostris, commonly known as the great blue spotted mudskipper, is a species of mudskipper native to the north-western Pacific Ocean. It can be found on the coastlines of Japan, eastern China, Sumatra, Malaysia, Taiwan and the Korean Peninsula.

== Description ==
Individuals of B. pectinirostris are predominantly greenish-grey in colour, with prominent sky blue speckles across their body, including their fins and on the skin below their eyes. They can grow all the way up to 7 inches (18 cm).

=== Anatomy ===
==== Epidermis ====
B. pectinirostis is amphibious, and breathes through its epidermis, a process known as cutaneous respiration. A study examining specimens from Jeollanam-do, South Korea, found that the epidermis of B. pectinirostis has three layers. The outermost layer consists of flattened, polygonal cells in one to eight layers of cells. The small cells are 5–7 μm by 5–8 μm, arranged in regular, compact rows on the outermost region of the layer, mostly in the jaw and fin epidermis. Larger mucous cells are distributed throughout all regions of the epidermis except the fins and the sucking disc, located in between dermal bulges.

The middle layer consists of layers of small cells and larger cells known as swollen cells that have a large vacuole. Whereas other air-breathing fishes have thicker middle layers with cells that uptake oxygen, members of the Boleophthalamus genus have the simple swollen cell structure that prevents dehydration while walking on land. The number of layers ranged from 1 to 15. The innermost layer is the stratus germinativum, and consists of one layer of cuboidal and roughly columnar basal cells. The thickness of the epidermis largely depends on the middle layer thickness, and is generally thick in the body and thin in the fins.

==== Dermal bulges ====
B. pectinirostis also has dermal bulges at the highest point of its scales on its body, except for where the fins and sucking disc are. The bulges' mean height ranges from 82 to 391 μm and their mean weight ranges from 172 to 485 μm. The distribution of bulges ranges from 0 to 6 per millimetre. The epidermis is very thin at these bulges, such that the stratus germinativum is very close to the outside.

==== Blood vessels ====
B. pectinirostis has blood vessels and dermal capillaries in its dermis bulges just below the inner stratus germinativum layer.

== Taxonomy ==
=== Etymology ===
B. pectinirostris's generic name, Boleophthalmus, is derived from the placement of the fish's eyes, which can be raised above the level of their orbits. It is taken from the Greek bole ('ejected') and ophthalmon ('eye'). The specific epithet is a compound Latin form, taken from pecten ('comb, rake') and rostrum ('beak'), and likely refers to the incised teeth of the fish's mandible, which it uses to scrape its food off the surface of the ground when on land.

=== Phylogeny ===
Phylogenetic analysis of B. pectinirostris conducted in 2014 found that the species may in fact include at least two cryptic species as part of a species complex; one being native to the South and East China Sea, and another being found in the Strait of Malacca northward towards Taiwan.

== Habitat and distribution ==
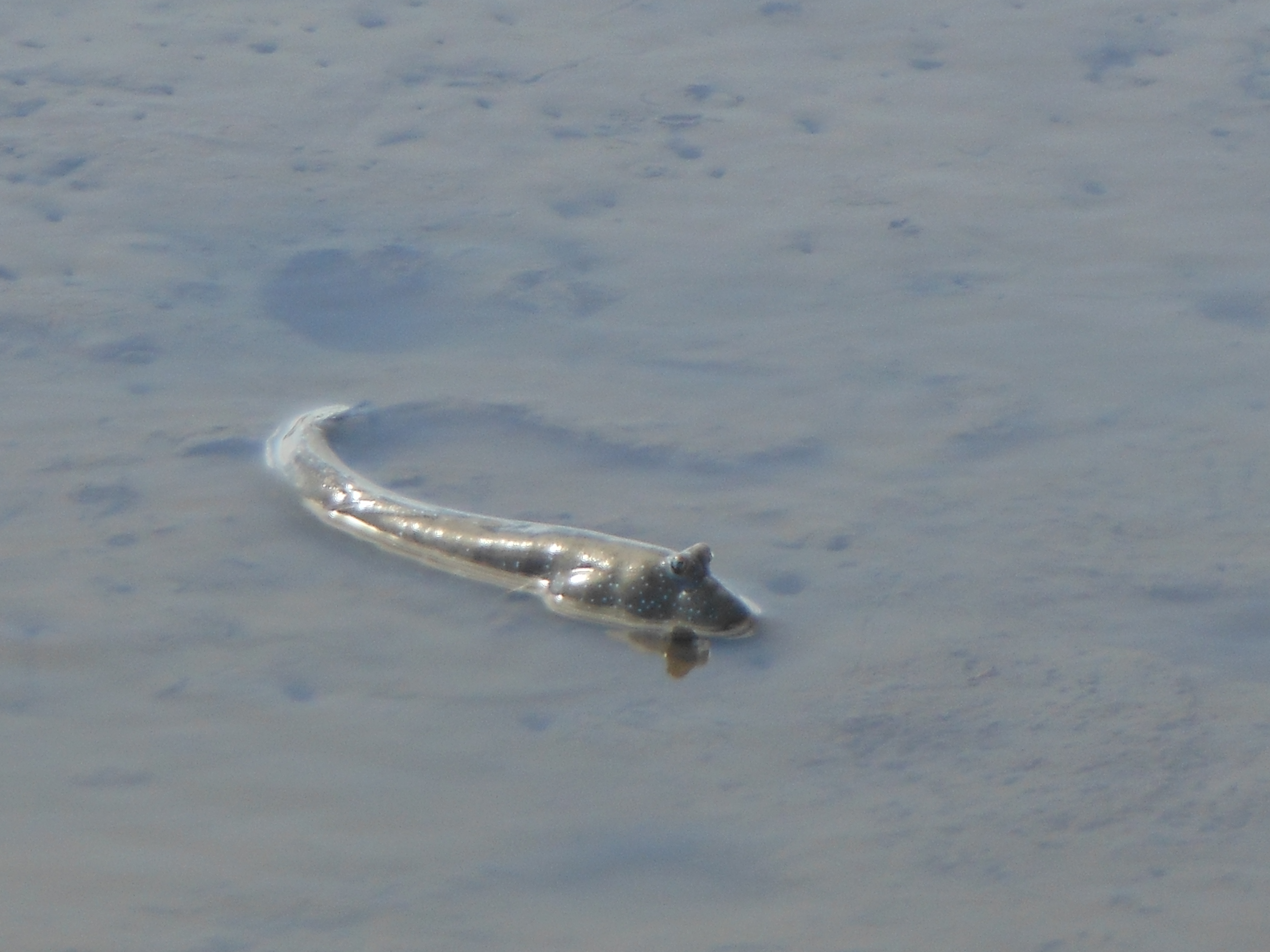
A great blue spotted mudskipper in shallow water on the Ariake Sea coastline at Saga, Saga Prefecture, Japan

Boleophthalmus pectinirostris can be found in Peninsular and eastern Malaysia, Sumatra (Indonesia), China, Taiwan, Korea, and Japan, living in warm tropical and sub-tropical estuaries. As a euryhaline species, it can also survive in a wide range of salinities. It prefers muddy areas near river mouths and mangroves, where it is easier to burrow in. Its presence in Malaysia and Sumatra was confirmed in 2009, where it is sympatric with Boleophthalmus boddarti. Prior to 2009, the populations in this region were misidentified as the species Boleophthalmus dussumieri, another species in the same genus which is related to both B. boddarti and B. pectiniriostris.

== Behaviour ==
=== Burrowing ===
Like other mudskippers, B. pectinirostris is able to move on land, using its pectoral and pelvic fins to clamber over the surface of tidal flats in its habitat at low tide. Using its tail, it can also hop across the ground to move faster. During high tide, the night, or when its predators are present, the fish retreats into a burrow, dug to a depth of approximately 1 metre (3.3 ft) below the surface, becoming active again during the day or when the threat has passed.

Boleophthalmus pectinirostris use their mouths to move soil and maintain their burrows, in the process increasing sediment surface area and oxygenating deeper layers of sediment. Burrows of the B. pectinirostris examined in mangrove ecosystems in Pandansari Brebes, Central Java were observed to have diameters of 3–4 centimetres (1.2–1.6 in) in muddy beach areas and 2–9 centimetres (0.79–3.54 in) in mangrove areas, identified as belonging to members of the species by tracks left by their fins.

Boleophthalmus pectinirostris in Funing Bay, Fujian, China also constructs mud walls around the entrance of their burrows in the winter, creating a shallow walled pool that maintains a relatively consistent temperature, maintains a microphytobenthos (e.g. diatoms) population for food, keeps other fish out, and prevents tides from moving the sediment around and in their burrows.

=== Territorialism ===
Great blue mudskippers are territorial, and males will fight with others of their species over access to burrows and during the breeding season, signalling their aggression by raising their large dorsal fins. The species is also known to compete with the Japanese mud crab (Macrophthalmus japonicus) over food in locations where both species occur.

=== Diet ===
Boleophthalmus pectinirostris are herbivores. During low tide, they leave their tunnels to graze on diatoms at the surface.

== Relationship with humans ==
=== Culinary use ===
Boleophthalmus pectinirostris is of culinary importance in Japan, and is fished in areas where the species is particularly abundant, such as the Ariake Sea and the Yatsushiro Sea in Saga Prefecture and Kumamoto Prefecture on the island of Kyushu. A style of cooking the fish local to this region involves grilling and basting it whole over charcoal.

=== Fishing ===
Boleophthalmus pectinirostris is typically caught by line or by trapping. The line method, referred to as mutsukake, is an unusual method developed in Japan that bears a resemblance to fly fishing, and is carried out at low tide with the use of a long fishing rod, a harpoon-like hook that catches in the fish's skin, and a wooden sled called an oshiita, which is used to travel out onto the tidal flats and to support oneself, as the surface of the flats is too soft to stand on. An alternative means of catching great blue spotted mudskippers is by using long burrow traps made out of hollow bamboo, which are driven into the tidal flat and trap the fish after they enter.

=== Status and conservation ===
As a shoreline species, B. pectinirostris is vulnerable to water pollution and overfishing, and had formerly been in decline from around 1970 due to these factors. However, surveys of the populations in the Ariake and Yatsushiro Sea conducted in 2013 found that the species' numbers had increased by over eight times since the previous survey, which was undertaken 16 years prior. B. pectinirostris's recovery is believed to be the result of improved water quality, reduced fishing of the species due to a lower demand, and implementation of conservation measures. A series of mild winters may have also factored into the population increase.
