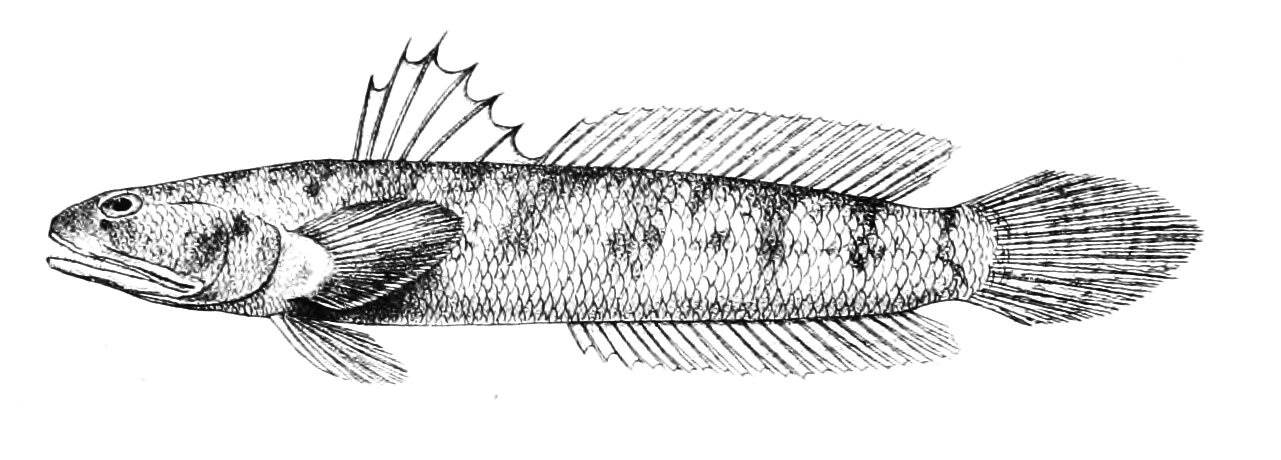
- Apocryptodon madurensis

Scientific classification
- Kingdom: Animalia
- Phylum: Chordata
- Class: Actinopterygii
- Order: Gobiiformes
- Family: Oxudercidae
- Subfamily: Oxudercinae
- Genus: Apocryptodon; Bleeker, 1874

Type species
- Apocryptes madurensis Bleeker, 1849

= Apocryptodon =

Genus of fishes

Apocryptodon is a genus of gobies in the family Oxudercidae, native to the Indian Ocean and the western Pacific Ocean.

== Species ==
There are currently two recognized species in this genus:

- Apocryptodon madurensis (Bleeker, 1849) (Madura goby)
- Apocryptodon punctatus Tomiyama, 1934
- Apocryptodon wirzi Koumans, 1937 (Wirz's goby)
