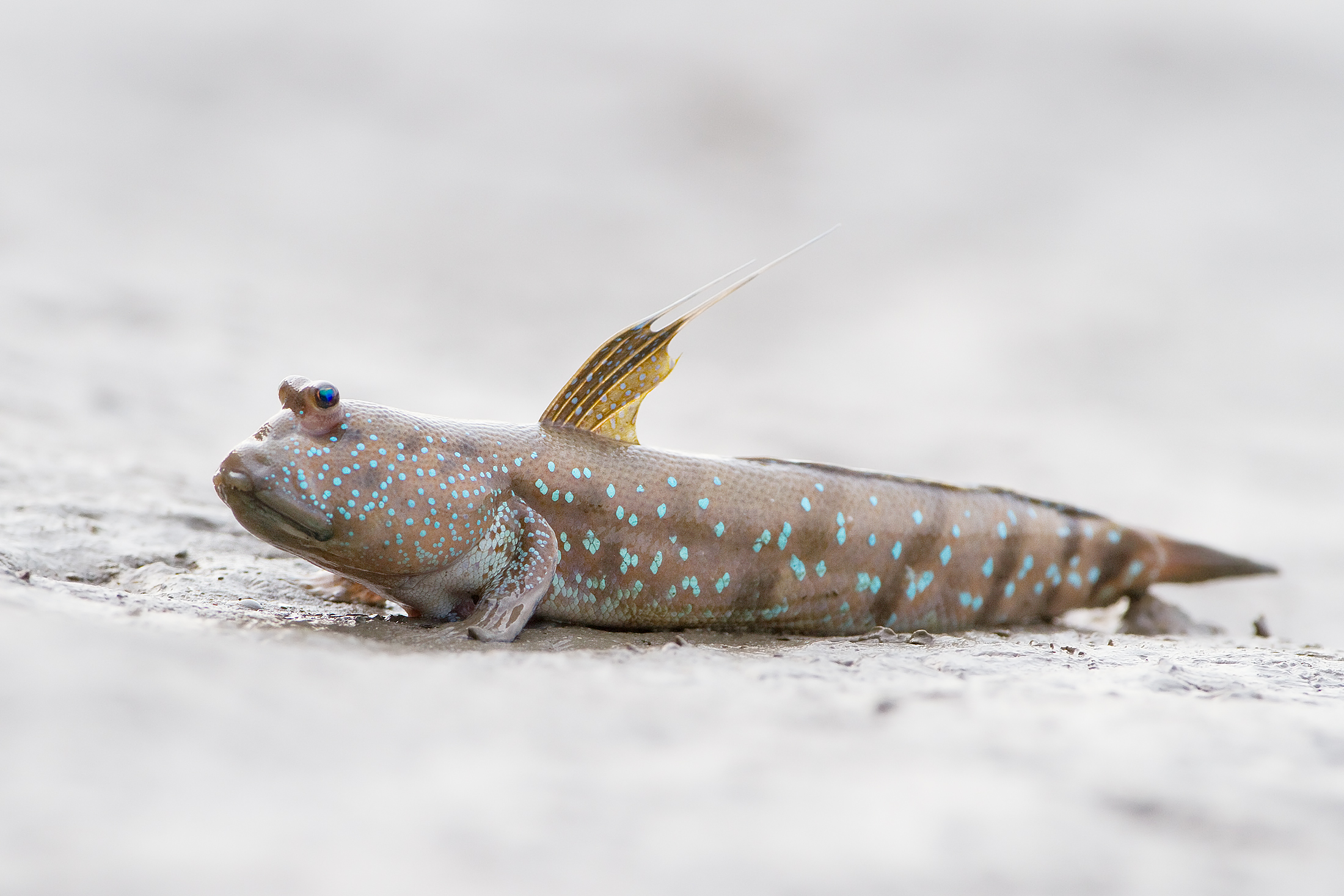

Conservation status
- Least Concern (IUCN 3.1)

Scientific classification
- Kingdom: Animalia
- Phylum: Chordata
- Class: Actinopterygii
- Order: Gobiiformes
- Family: Oxudercidae
- Genus: Boleophthalmus
- Species: B. boddarti

Binomial name
- Boleophthalmus boddarti (Pallas, 1770)

Synonyms
- Gobius boddarti

= Boleophthalmus boddarti =

Species of fish

Boleophthalmus boddarti, commonly known as Boddart's goggle-eyed goby, is a species of mudskipper native to the Indo-Pacific, and the type species of the genus Boleophthalmus.

In Vietnam, this species is called "Cá Bống Sao", which means "star sky goby".

== Taxonomy ==
=== Etymology ===
The specific epithet, boddarti, is in reference to Pierre Boddaërt, who collected the holotype for the species.

== Description ==
Like other mudskippers, Boleophthalmus boddarti is capable of moving on land, and uses its pectoral and pelvic fins to move about on the surface of tidal flats in its native range at low tide. The fish is boldly patterned, with rows of blue spots along its flanks and cheeks, as well as dark bands running down its body.

=== Anatomy ===
B. boddarti has fused pelvic fins, as in its fin rays are interconnected and merged with its skin, which aid in its walking across the mudflats it lives in. Its large pelvic ray fin bone structure provides B. boddarti with a sitting pad for stability in semi-terrestrial substrate and cushion for landing after hopping. The pelvic fins can also flatten into a slightly concave shape when it makes impact to further cushion its landing. Similarly to other mudskippers, B. boddarti has moist skin with capillaries near the surface in dermal bulges that allow it to perform cutaneous respiration, although it has been observed to have less mucus-secreting cells than more terrestrial species of mudskipper such as Periophthalmus variabilis, on account of it living primarily in aquatic areas and thus having greater access to moisture.

== Distribution ==
B. boddarti occurs across the Indo-Pacific region, ranging from India in the west to Papua New Guinea in the east, with additional populations found on the coastline of China in the north and Sulaibikhat Bay in the Persian Gulf off the coast of Kuwait. Populations in Malaysia and Sumatra are sympatric with the closely related species Boleophthalmus pectinirostris. In India, the species is sympatric with the similarly-related Boleophthalmus dussumieri.

== Behaviour ==
=== Territoriality ===
Individuals of B. boddarti are noticeably territorial, and will fight with others of their species to defend their burrows at low tide, raising their dorsal fins as a threat display. Males will also use their tail to jump into the air with their dorsal fins raised as part of a courtship display to attract females to their burrows during the breeding season.

=== Diet ===
Boleophthalmus boddarti is primarily herbivorous, and browses on green algae by scraping it off the surface of the ground at low tide using horizontal motions of its head and the teeth of its lower jaw. It also eats benthic crustaceans, polychaete worms, fish eggs and copepods.

=== Reproduction ===
Male B. boddarti jump to attract females to spawn in their burrows. A study in Trần Đề district, Sóc Trăng province, Vietnam, found that the sex ratio of B. boddarti distribution during spawning season is approximately 1:1 between males and females, similar to the goby species Pseudapocryptes elongatus and different from some other species of gobies in the region, in which females tend to have a higher catch rate than males. The study found that development of ovaries and testes in B. boddarti spans the four months from July to October. Mature gonads contain gametes at multiple stages of development, suggesting B. boddarti spawns multiple broods of offspring over the span of three months, from August to October in the mid-wet season. B. boddarti have a median length at sexual maturity of 11.52 centimetres (4.54 in). Larger females release larger, more numerous eggs later in the spawning season as their bodies grow larger and heavier, and have high fecundity. B. boddarti in the Sóc Trăng study were found to release 9,800–33,000 eggs per female in the breeding season, but they have been observed to lay fewer eggs in more polluted environments, such as a study that found that they laid 2,100–12,300 eggs in polluted creeks in Mumbai, India.

== Relationship with humans ==
=== As food ===
B. boddarti is edible, and is occasionally caught and eaten, though it isn't targeted by commercial fisheries. The species is sometimes found on sale at markets in the vicinity of its native range. It is commercially important in Vietnam and Thailand.

=== Status and conservation ===
B. boddarti was evaluated as being of Least Concern in 2021, as the species occupies a wide range without significant fragmentation. While a definitive population size for the species is unknown, B. boddarti is believed to be relatively abundant according to recent surveying. The main threat to this species in its native range is water pollution.
