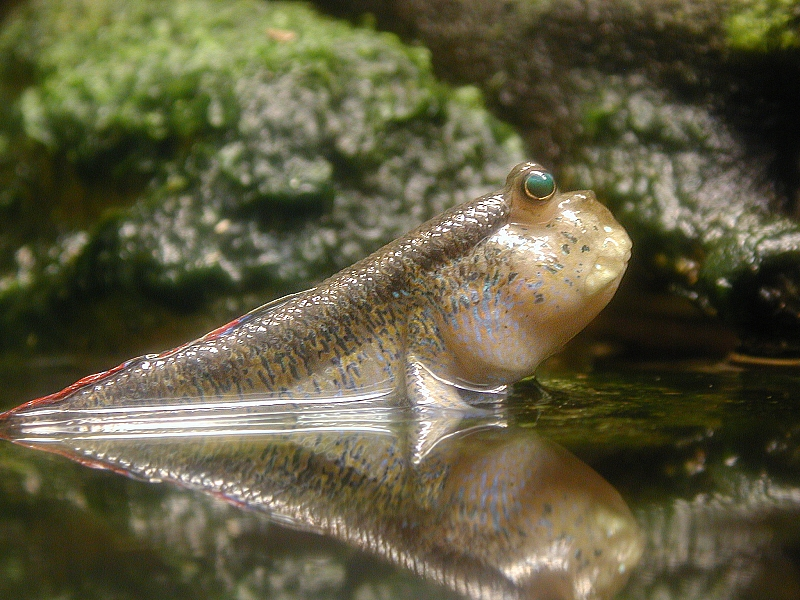

Conservation status
- Least Concern (IUCN 3.1)

Scientific classification
- Kingdom: Animalia
- Phylum: Chordata
- Class: Actinopterygii
- Order: Gobiiformes
- Family: Oxudercidae
- Genus: Periophthalmodon
- Species: P. septemradiatus

Binomial name
- Periophthalmodon septemradiatus (Hamilton, 1822)

Synonyms
- Gobius septemradiatus Hamilton, 1822; Gobius tredecemradiatus Hamilton, 1822; Periophthalmodon tredecemradiatus (Hamilton, 1822); Periophthalmus borneensis Bleeker, 1850

= Periophthalmodon septemradiatus =

Species of fish

Periophthalmodon septemradiatus is a species of mudskipper found along tropical shorelines of the eastern Indian Ocean where it occurs in marine, brackish and fresh waters from India to Mekong Delta Vietnam, Indonesia. It is found along in estuaries as well as in the rivers.

This species inhabits mud banks which are covered by such vegetation as mangroves, nypah palms where the water is of very low salinity, near 0 ppt, in the upper reaches of estuaries and in small tributaries. It can grow to a length of 10 centimetres (3.9 in) TL.

This species is of no interest to local commercial fisheries. The specific name means "seven rayed" and refers to the seven short rays in this fish's first dorsal fin.

P. septemradiatus is the only fish known to communicate acoustically while out of water and when they are alarmed they dash towards land rather than water.

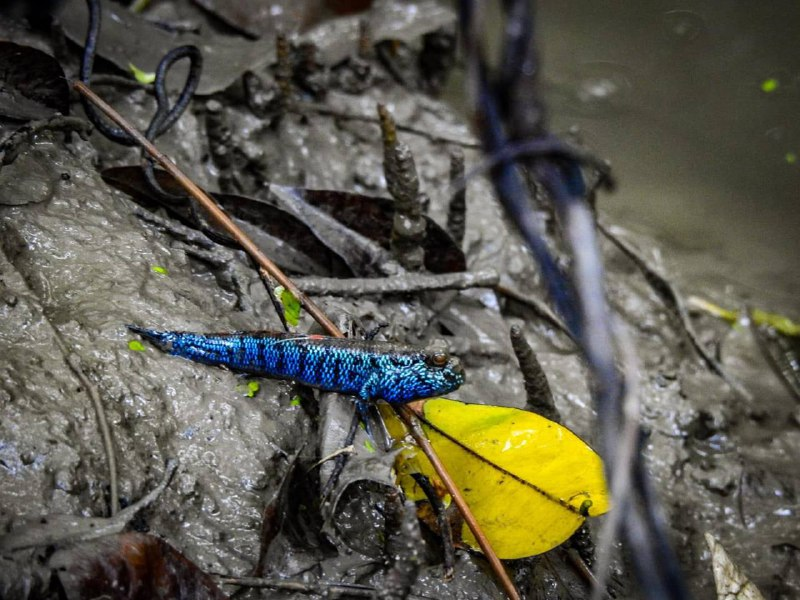
Male 'Periophthalmodon septemradiatus' in nuptial coloration taken at Taki Golpata Forest

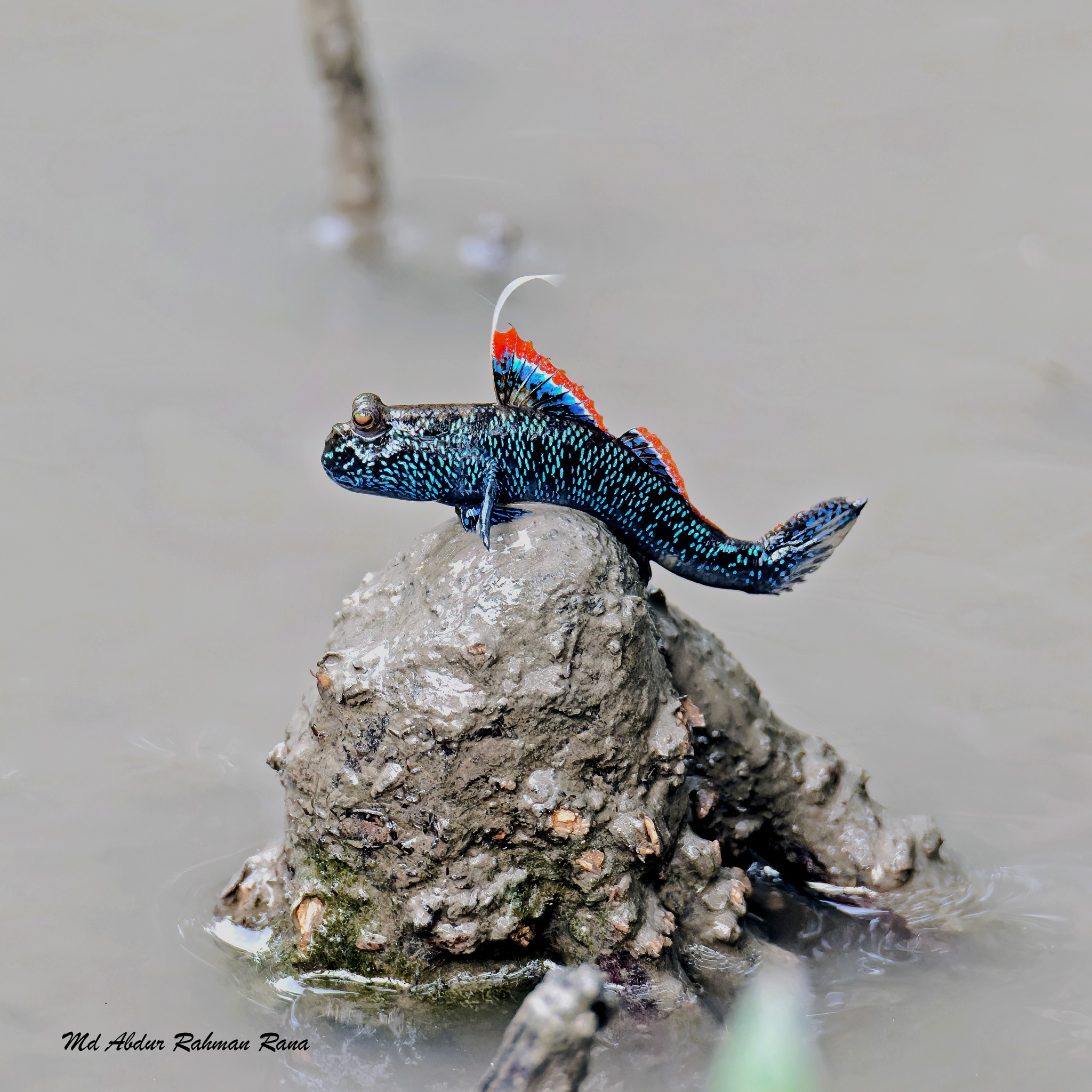
Male 'Periophthalmodon septemradiatus' in nuptial coloration taken at Sundarbans, Bangladesh
