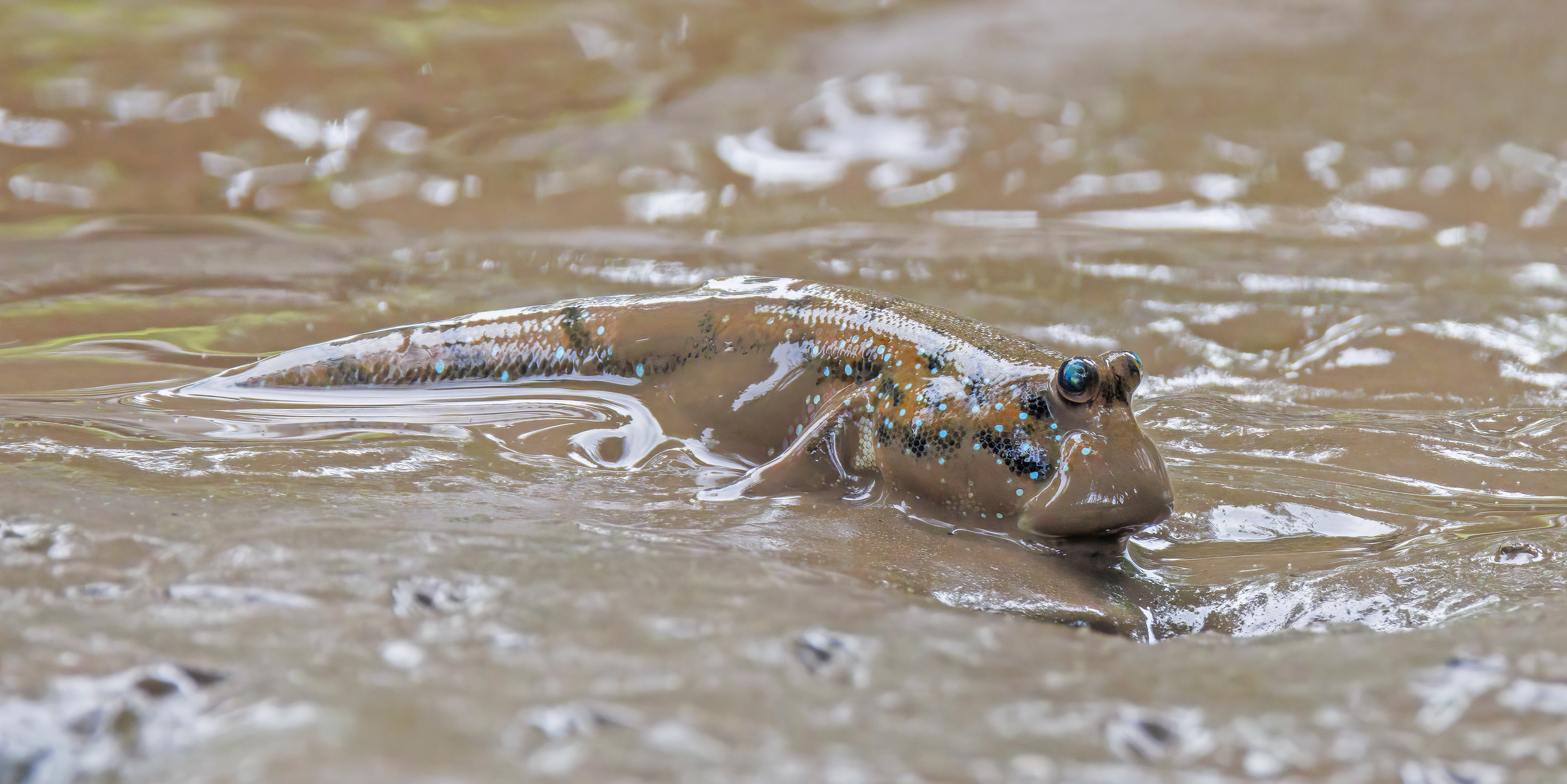
- Mekong Delta, Vietnam

Conservation status
- Least Concern (IUCN 3.1)

Scientific classification
- Kingdom: Animalia
- Phylum: Chordata
- Class: Actinopterygii
- Division: Teleostei
- Order: Gobiiformes
- Family: Oxudercidae
- Genus: Periophthalmodon
- Species: P. schlosseri

Binomial name
- Periophthalmodon schlosseri (Pallas, 1770)

Synonyms
- Gobius schlosseri Pallas, 1770; Periophthalmus schlosseri (Pallas, 1770)

= Giant mudskipper =

Species of fish

The giant mudskipper (Periophthalmodon schlosseri) is a species of mudskipper native to the tropical shores of the eastern Indian Ocean and the western Pacific Ocean where it occurs in marine, brackish and fresh waters. It is most frequently found along muddy shores in estuaries as well as in the tidal zones of rivers. It lives in burrows that it constructs in higher grounds of the intertidal zone, which are typically filled with both water and air. During warmer seasons, it is typically active outside of its burrow during low tide. It is an obligate air-breather and is capable of drowning without sufficient access to air, so it spends much of its life on land.

As its name suggests, the giant mudskipper is distinguishable by its larger size when compared to other mudskipper species. Males have been recorded to grow up to 27.5 cm (10.8 in) TL, while females have been found to grow up to 28.5 cm (11.2 in) TL. Typically, it is a yellow or greenish-brown color with light blue speckles on its side, but when disturbed or agitated, it will display a bold, black, and uninterrupted horizontal stripe that runs from its eye to its caudal peduncle.

This species is of minor importance to local commercial fisheries. Aside from being sold at high values as a food source, mudskippers are also used in traditional medicines in Malaysia and parts of India.

== Etymology ==
The name Periophthalmodon is derived from Periophthalmus, a visually similar genus under the Oxucerdinae subfamily, and the Latin suffix -odon, which means "toothed".

The specific name honors the Dutch physician and naturalist Johann Albert Schlosser (1733-1769), who was a friend of Peter Simon Pallas and who received the type from the East Indies and sent it to Pallas.

== Taxonomy ==
The giant mudskipper is under the subfamily Oxucerdinae, which are a group of gobies that are commonly referred to as mudskippers. These fish are able to live both on land and in water, with preferences for terrestrial or aquatic living varying within species. They possess elongate bodies that are compressed at the posterior with cycloid scales that range in sizes, and eyes that protrude at the top of their heads. These eyes provide mudskippers with accurate vision both in and out of water, and mudskippers are able to blink by retracting them into cavities and covering the rest of the eye with a membrane. In addition to being able to blink, their protruding eyes are also moveable, giving them a wide range of vision in order to spot potential predators to hide from. As carnivores, mudskippers also possess canine-like, or sharp, teeth.

There are only three species within the Periophthalmodon genus, including Periophthalmodon schlosseri, or the giant mudskipper. Fishes in this genus are distinguished from others by their two rows of teeth in their upper jaw, as well as the black stripe that runs laterally from their eye to posterior. It has restricted gill openings and an extra flap of skin is present on its gill cover. They are also known for being highly terrestrial and carnivorous. The giant mudskipper, in particular, is entirely scaled except for its isthmus, which may help distinguish it from other similar species.

== Distribution ==
The giant mudskipper can be found in intertidal mudflats and mangroves in Eastern India, Thailand, Malaysia, Singapore, Indonesia, and Vietnam. Although giant mudskippers are more commonly found in areas close to mangroves, they can sometimes be found living in mudflats without any nearby mangroves as well.

== Biology ==
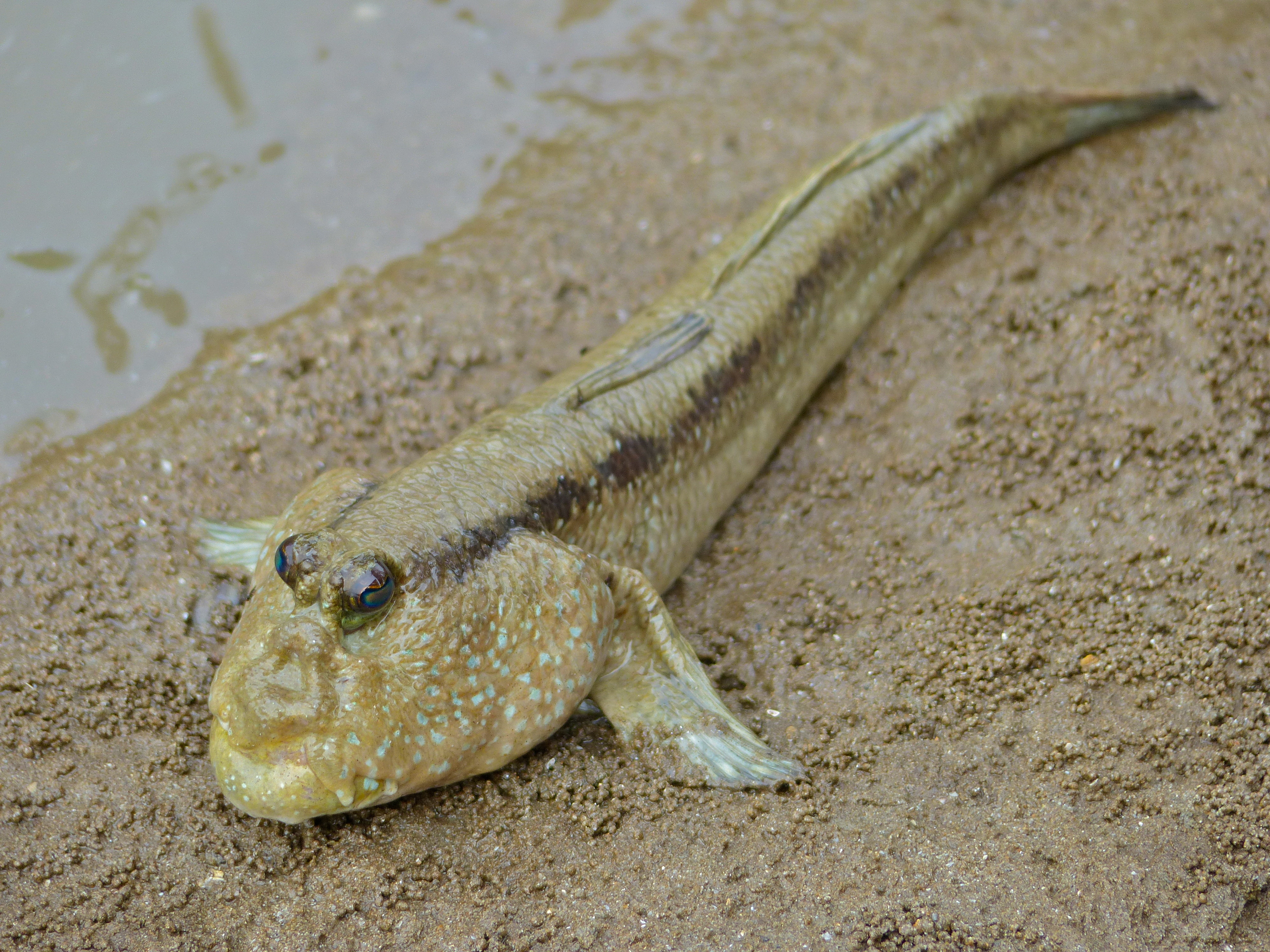
navigating on land with its pectoral fins.

As a mudskipper, the giant mudskipper can "walk" on land with the use of its pectoral fins. By propelling itself with its caudal fin, or tail, and pectoral fins, it is able to "skip" or leap across muddy surfaces. Its fused pelvic fins also help the mudskipper stick on to surfaces on land.

The giant mudskipper has multiple adaptations within their gill structure to support its highly terrestrial lifestyle. In order to prevent coalescence of gill lamellae upon air exposure, the giant mudskipper has thickened gill rods, branched gill filaments, and thick, fused secondary lamellae. Its thick gill rods provide stronger support for their gill filaments, which are branched to minimize length and maximize support in air. Its secondary lamellae are also fused, which aid in retaining water. Additionally, the lamellae also contain tiny ridges and a mucus coat to protect the giant mudskipper from desiccation, or drying out.

Like other mudskippers, the giant mudskipper can breathe air. To do so, it will gulp air, which allows oxygen to easily diffuse into its bloodstream because of its highly vascularized buccal surfaces. While gulping air, it may also move its operculum while submerged to trap water within the gills. Because its gills are more adapted for the retention of moisture in terrestrial environments rather than respiration, the giant mudskipper primarily uses air breathing to respire, with its buccal cavity, or mouth, being the main organ to facilitate respiration. As an obligate air-breather, the giant mudskipper will still inflate its buccal cavity with air even when swimming in water.

In addition to gulping air, the giant mudskipper also has a dense capillary network close to the surface of the skin of its head, allowing for cutaneous respiration. These blood vessels are located at the top of the micro-ridges on its head to maximize surface area.

Male and female giant mudskippers can be distinguished by their genital papillae. Males have pointed genital papillae, while females have papillae that are rounded.

== Ecology and behavior ==
=== Diet ===
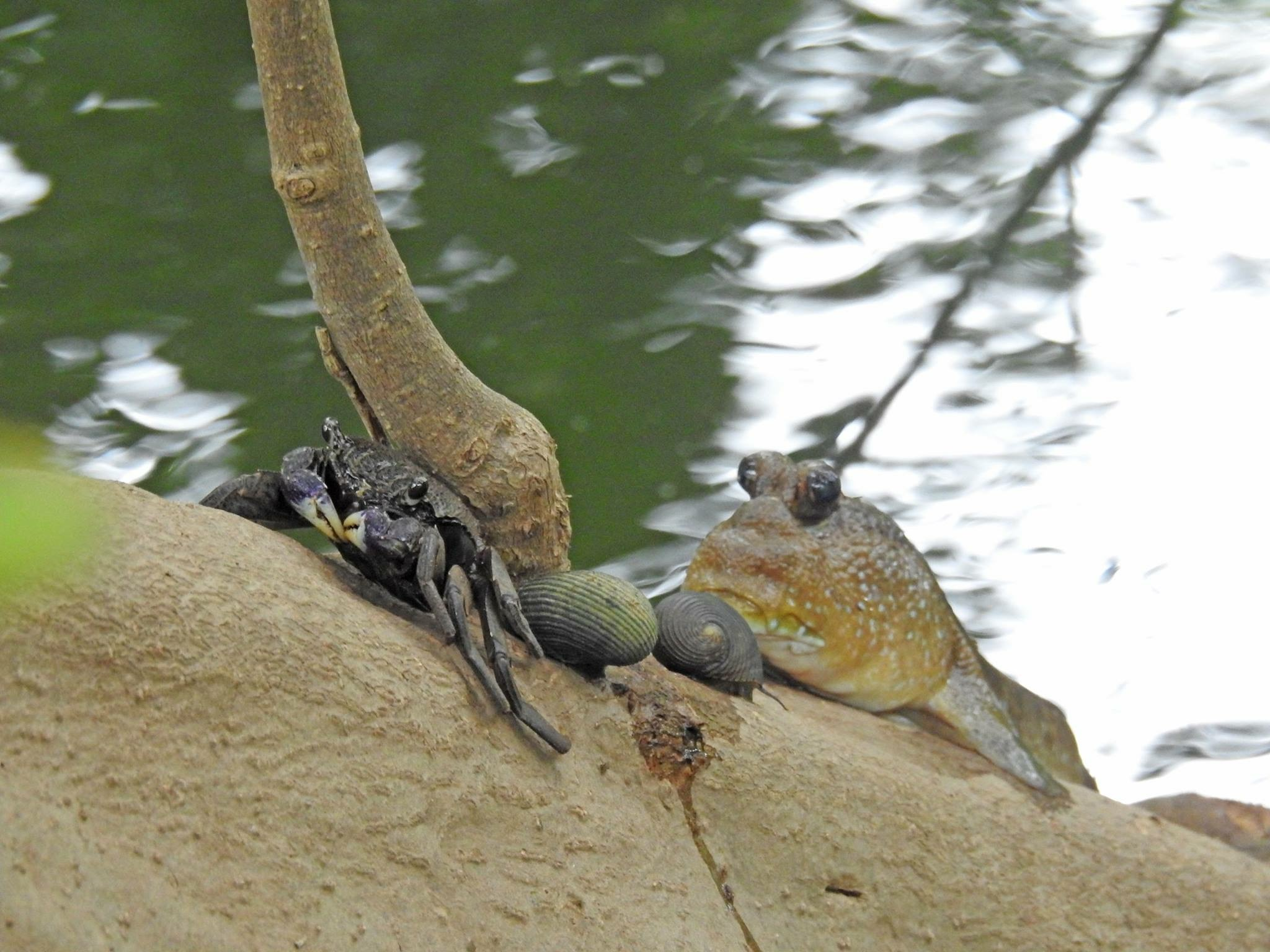
A giant mudskipper hunting for its favorite prey.

The giant mudskipper is a generalist carnivore, with a preference for small crabs and fish. The giant mudskipper typically forages for prey that are close to its burrow, though it is not uncommon for them to explore out of the range of their burrows. It is an ambush predator, and upon discovering its prey, it will slowly follow it before ambushing it by leaping. It may also leap at prey while swimming. The giant mudskipper will then attempt to trap their prey using its tail, and once trapped, the giant mudskipper captures the prey within its mouth. Occasionally, they will even capture prey that are larger than their gape width, which they will repeatedly bite until they are subdued. After moving to a safe place to feed, they can also sometimes be seen playing with their food.

Male giant mudskippers prefer to feed during low tide when small crabs are available. However, during high tide, when crabs are not as accessible, they will instead feed on alternative food sources, like insects or worms. Female giant mudskippers were found to prefer eating small fish during the spawning season, as they tend to stay closer to the water's edge in comparison to males.

When eating its prey, the giant mudskipper will usually fill its mouth with water to aid in swallowing.

=== Behavior ===
The giant mudskipper typically creates J or U-shaped burrows that are submerged in water at high intertidal zones. To dig these burrows, the giant mudskipper will scoop mud into its mouth, often leaving piles of "mud pellets" around the burrow opening. These burrows serve as protection against predators as well as a resting point during high tide and are capable of trapping air.

Since these burrows contain water that is hypoxic, the giant mudskipper will often insert air to provide the burrow with oxygen. To transport oxygen, the giant mudskipper will fill its mouth with air right before entering its burrow and release the air once inside the burrow. It will repeat this action until a significant amount of oxygen has been released into the burrow. This oxygen is used both as a storage for the adult giant mudskipper as well as a means of aerating broods.

The giant mudskipper is highly territorial and aggressive, which they express by mouth gaping, raising their fins, pigment darkening, and chasing. Aside from fighting with their mouths, the giant mudskipper rarely interacts with others of its species and is a solitary animal.

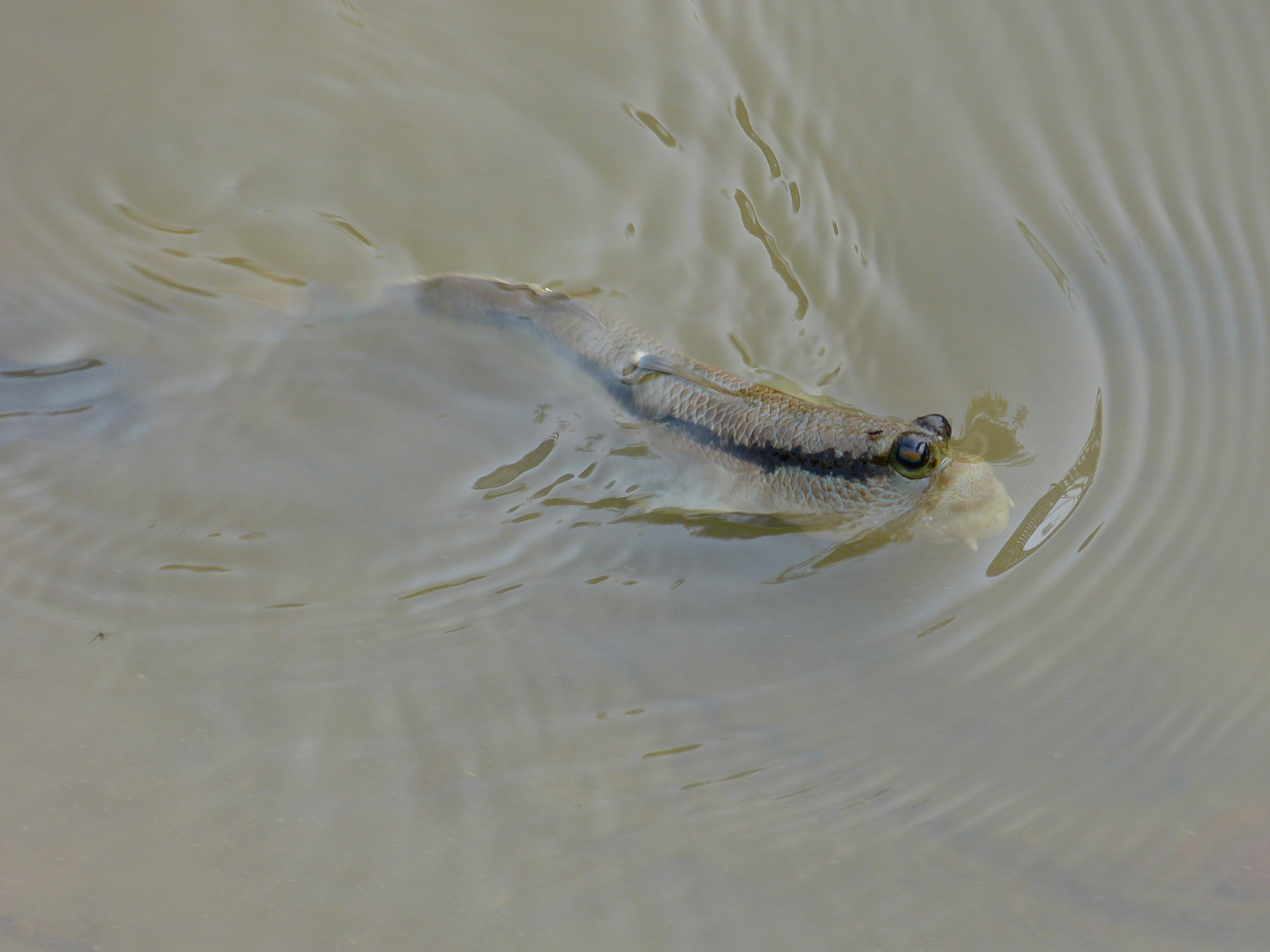
A giant mudskipper swimming with its eyes above water.

Since the giant mudskipper breathes air through its skin, it swims with its eyes and snout above water and will only immerse itself for a few seconds when hiding. During low tide, it will also frequently sit in its burrow with its head above water.

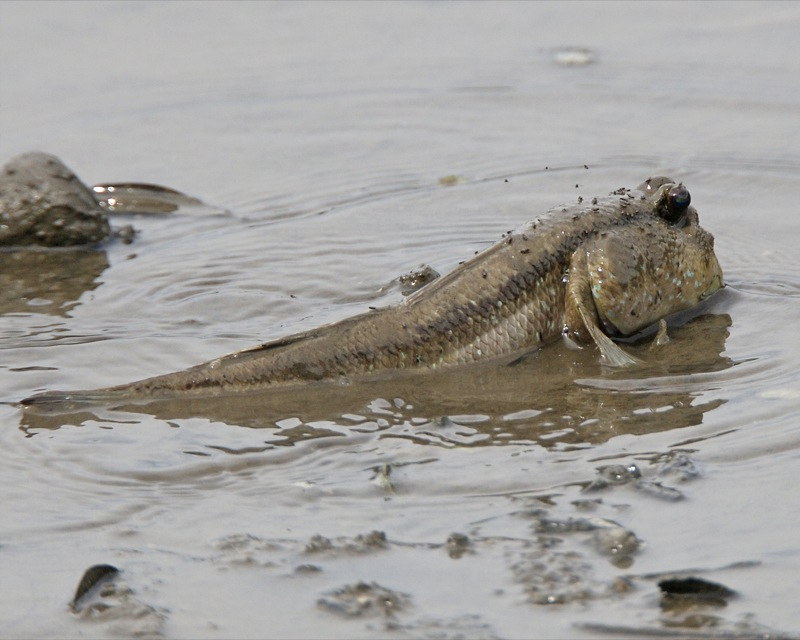
A giant mudskipper tormented by insects.

Due to the presence of a dense capillary network on the giant mudskipper's head, the giant mudskipper is frequently subject to swarms of insects which typically land on either the head or the back of the fish. Because of this, the giant mudskipper can often be found rolling around in sediment or submerging itself into water to get rid of insects.

=== Reproduction ===
Spawning typically occurs twice a year, the first being from June to July, and the second being from October to November. This is attributed to the fact that the monsoon season occurs from April to October, providing the giant mudskipper ample access to food.

In addition to being used as a site of protection and rest, male giant mudskippers will also dig burrows to attract a single female, as they are a monogamous species. Females then will lay eggs on the roof or walls of the burrows, as the waters contained in these burrows are severely hypoxic and unfit for embryonic development. To aerate the broods, male giant mudskippers will continuously refresh the air during low tide by filling up their mouths with air and inserting it into their burrows.

After females lay their eggs on the walls of the burrows, they are driven out and male giant mudskippers will be the sole caretaker of their brood. Females that are driven out will typically stay near the water's edge afterwards.

== Threats and conservation status ==
As of 2017, the giant mudskipper is currently listed as being of Least Concern. However, declines in giant mudskipper populations can be seen due to factors such as overfishing, pollution, urbanization, and habitat destruction, with the latter two arguably being the biggest threats to the giant mudskipper. As a result of urbanization and habitat destruction, giant mudskippers can sometimes be found in more urban areas, where they have less access to food to eat and less vegetation to hide in. Additionally, even slight salinity changes have been found to result in more energy being used for osmoregulation, resulting in the giant mudskipper needing to rest more and consequently having less time to feed in these environments.
