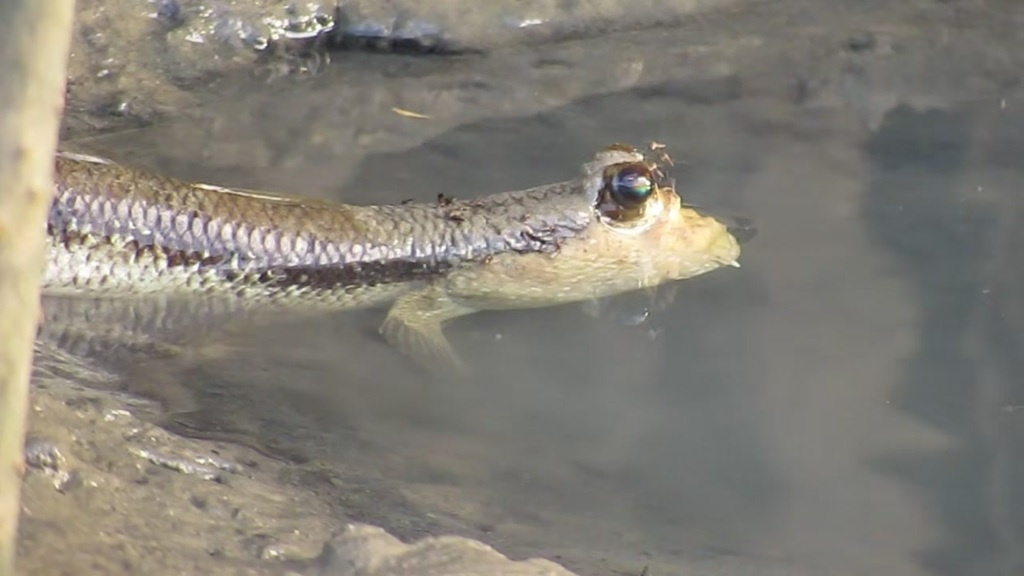

Scientific classification
- Kingdom: Animalia
- Phylum: Chordata
- Class: Actinopterygii
- Order: Gobiiformes
- Family: Oxudercidae
- Genus: Periophthalmodon
- Species: P. freycineti

Binomial name
- Periophthalmodon freycineti (Quoy & Gaimard, 1824)

Synonyms
- Periophthalmus freycineti Quoy & Gaimard, 1824; Periophthalmodon freycineti Valenciennes, 1837; Periophthalmus australis Castelnau, 1875

= Periophthalmodon freycineti =

Species of fish

Periophthalmodon freycineti, the pug-headed mudskipper, is a species of mudskipper from the subfamily Oxudercinae of the gobiiform family Oxudercidae. It distribution extends from the Philippines through eastern Indonesia, Papua New Guinea and northern Queensland. Its habitat is tidal creeks, mud banks and inlets where it is a predator on small fish, crabs and other invertebrates such as insects.

== Etymology ==
The specific name honours the French explorer Louis de Freycinet (1779-1841), the leader of the expedition on which the type was collected.
