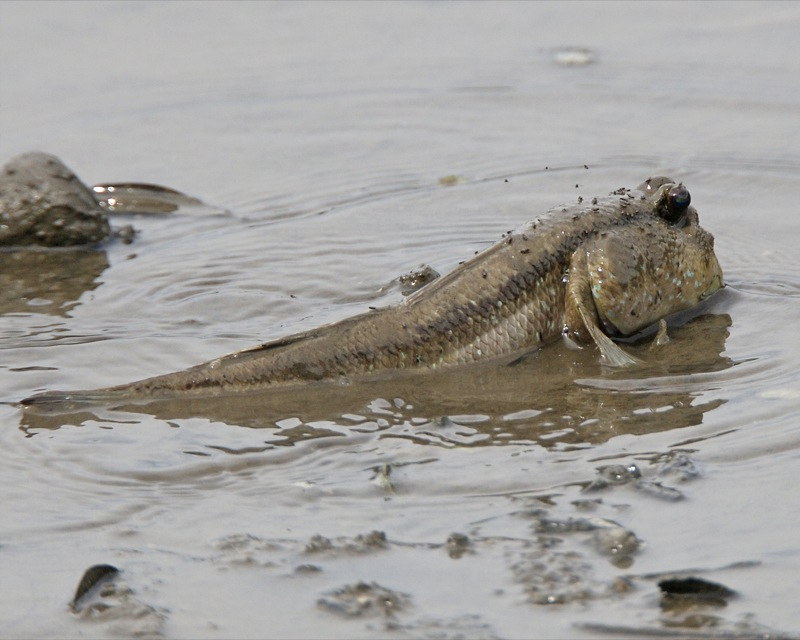
- Giant mudskipper (P. schlosseri)

Scientific classification
- Kingdom: Animalia
- Phylum: Chordata
- Class: Actinopterygii
- Division: Teleostei
- Order: Gobiiformes
- Family: Oxudercidae
- Subfamily: Oxudercinae
- Genus: Periophthalmodon; Bleeker, 1874

Type species
- Gobius schlosseri Pallas, 1770

= Periophthalmodon =

Genus of fishes

Periophthalmodon is a genus of fish in the family Oxudercidae. It is one of the genera commonly known as mudskippers, found along muddy shores, estuaries and lower reaches of rivers in Southeast Asia, Papua New Guinea and Queensland, Australia.

== Species ==
There are currently three species in the genus:

- Periophthalmodon freycineti (Quoy & Gaimard, 1824) (Pug-headed mudskipper)
- Periophthalmodon schlosseri (Pallas, 1770) (Giant mudskipper)
- Periophthalmodon septemradiatus (F. Hamilton, 1822)
