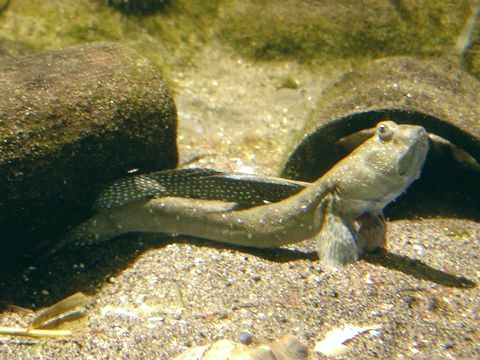
- B. pectinirostris

Scientific classification
- Kingdom: Animalia
- Phylum: Chordata
- Class: Actinopterygii
- Division: Teleostei
- Order: Gobiiformes
- Family: Oxudercidae
- Subfamily: Oxudercinae
- Genus: Boleophthalmus; Valenciennes, 1837

Type species
- Gobius boddarti Pallas, 1770

= Boleophthalmus =

Genus of fishes

Boleophthalmus is a genus of mudskippers native to the Indian Ocean and the western Pacific Ocean.

== Species ==
There are currently six recognized species in this genus:

- B. birdsongi Murdy, 1989 (Birdsong's goggle-eyed goby)
- B. boddarti (Pallas, 1770) (Boddart's goggle-eyed goby)
- B. caeruleomaculatus McCulloch & Waite, 1918 (Bluespotted mudskipper)
- B. dussumieri Valenciennes, 1837 (Dussumier's mudskipper)
- B. pectinirostris (Linnaeus, 1758) (Great blue spotted mudskipper)
- B. poti Polgar, Jaafar & Konstantinidis, 2013
