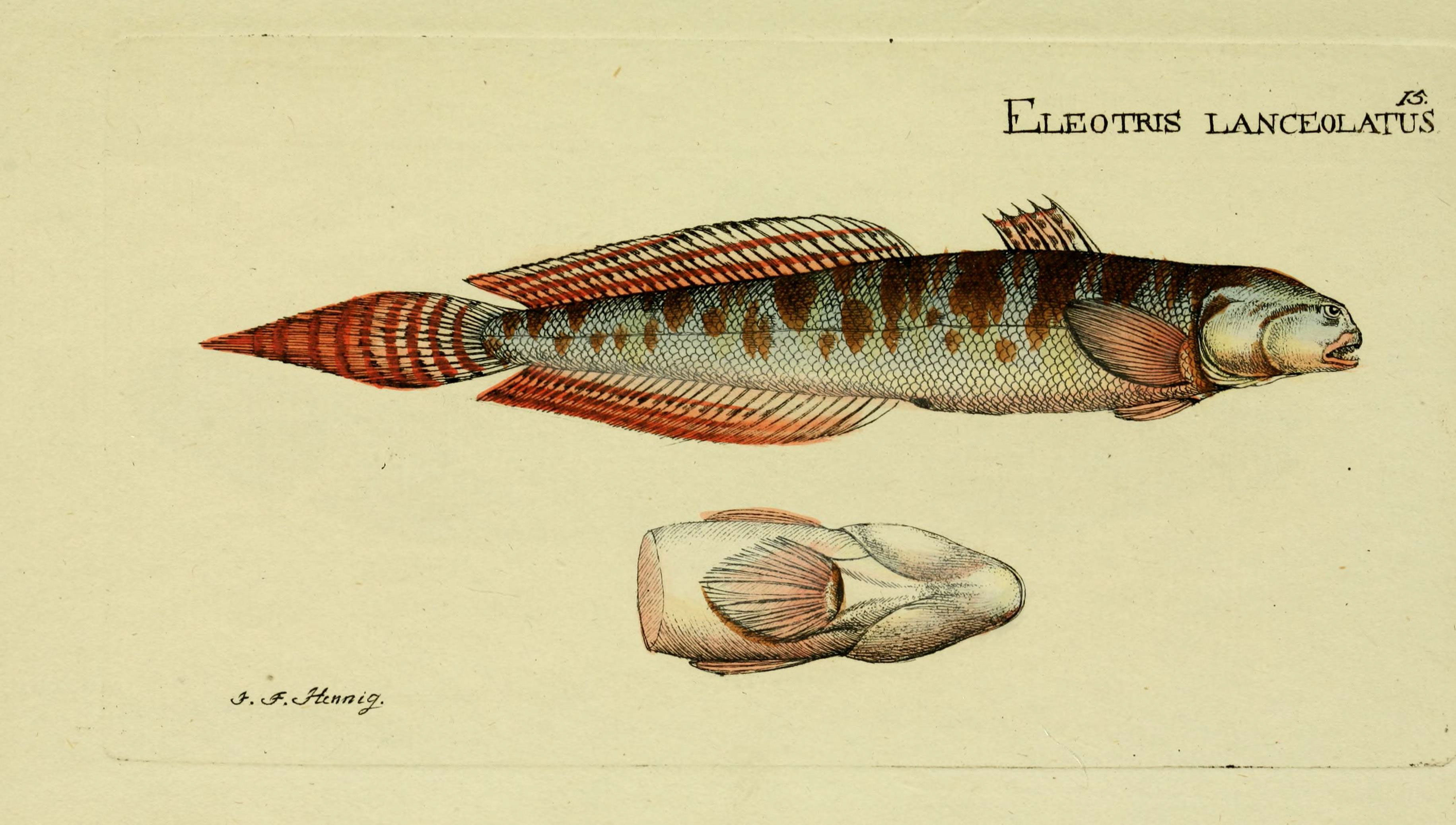
- Pseudapocryptes elongatus

Scientific classification
- Kingdom: Animalia
- Phylum: Chordata
- Class: Actinopterygii
- Division: Teleostei
- Order: Gobiiformes
- Family: Oxudercidae
- Subfamily: Oxudercinae
- Genus: Pseudapocryptes; Bleeker, 1874

Type species
- Apocryptes lanceolatus as a synonym of Pseudapocryptes elongatus Cantor, 1849

= Pseudapocryptes =

Genus of fishes

Pseudapocryptes is a genus of gobies native to fresh and brackish waters of the Indian Ocean and Pacific Ocean coasts from India to Tahiti.

== Species ==
There are currently two recognized species in this genus:

- Pseudapocryptes borneensis (Bleeker, 1855)
- Pseudapocryptes elongatus (G. Cuvier, 1816)
