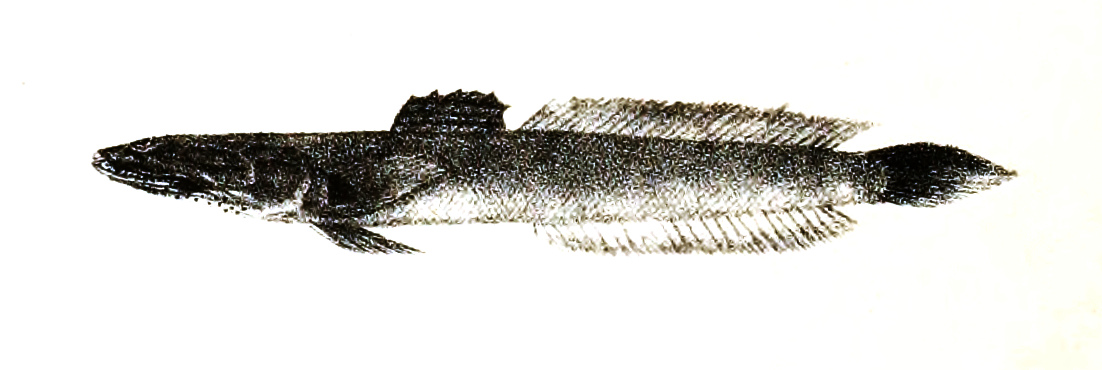
- Oxuderces dentatus

Scientific classification
- Kingdom: Animalia
- Phylum: Chordata
- Class: Actinopterygii
- Order: Gobiiformes
- Family: Oxudercidae
- Subfamily: Oxudercinae
- Genus: Oxuderces; Eydoux & Souleyet, 1848

Type species
- Oxuderces dentatus Eydoux & Souleyet, 1848

= Oxuderces =

Genus of fishes

Oxuderces is a genus of fish in the family Gobiidae native to fresh and brackish waters of coasts of the Indian and Pacific Ocean.

== Species ==
These are the recognized species in this genus:

- Oxuderces dentatus Eydoux & Souleyet, 1848
- Oxuderces nexipinnis (Cantor, 1849)
- Oxuderces wirzi (Koumans, 1937) (Wirz's goby)
