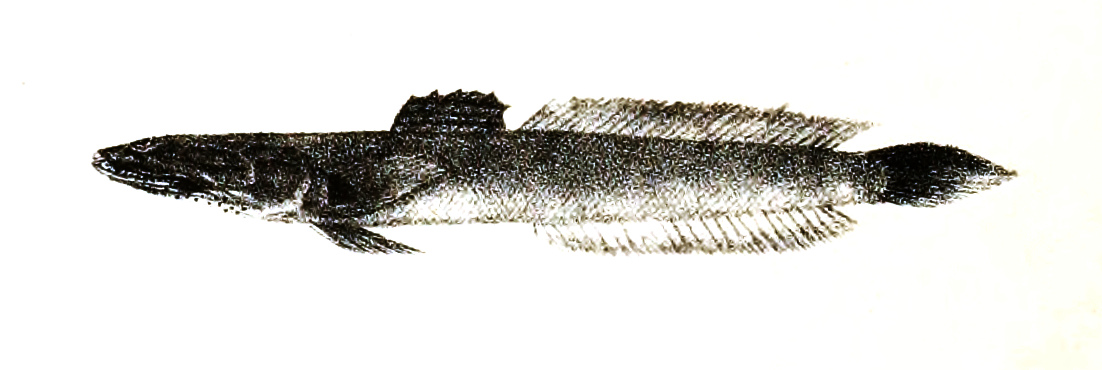
- Oxuderces dentatus

Conservation status
- Data Deficient (IUCN 3.1)

Scientific classification
- Kingdom: Animalia
- Phylum: Chordata
- Class: Actinopterygii
- Order: Gobiiformes
- Family: Oxudercidae
- Genus: Oxuderces
- Species: O. dentatus

Binomial name
- Oxuderces dentatus Eydoux & Souleyet, 1850

Synonyms
- Apocryptodon wirzi Koumans, 1937

= Oxuderces dentatus =

Species of fish

Oxuderces dentatus, is a species of goby found in the Indo-West Pacific from India to Vietnam, Macau, China, Malaysia and Indonesia.

== Description ==
This species reaches a length of 10.0 cm (3.9 in).

== Etymology ==
The fishes species name meaning toothed, referring to the large canine teeth of upper jaw
