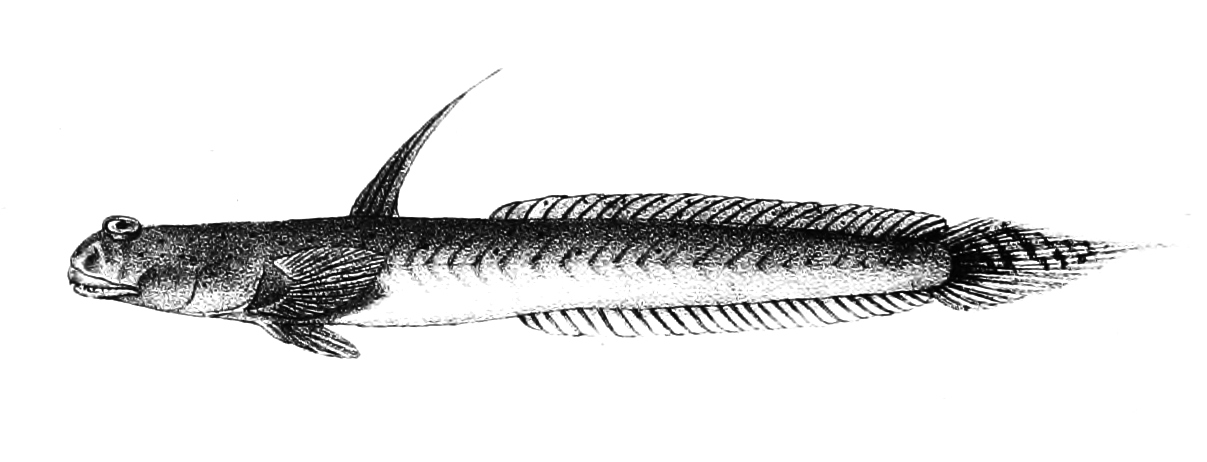
- Scartelaos histophorus

Scientific classification
- Kingdom: Animalia
- Phylum: Chordata
- Class: Actinopterygii
- Order: Gobiiformes
- Family: Oxudercidae
- Subfamily: Oxudercinae
- Genus: Scartelaos; Swainson, 1839

Type species
- Gobius viridis as a synonym for Scartelaos histophorus F. Hamilton, 1822

Synonyms
- Boleops T. N. Gill, 1863

= Scartelaos =

Genus of fishes

Scartelaos is a genus of gobies native to the coasts of the Indian Ocean and the western Pacific Ocean.

== Species ==
There are currently four recognised species in this genus:

- Scartelaos cantoris (F. Day, 1871)
- Scartelaos gigas Y. T. Chu & H. W. Wu, 1963
- Scartelaos histophorus (Valenciennes, 1837) (Walking goby)
- Scartelaos tenuis (F. Day, 1876) (Indian Ocean slender mudskipper)
