= Zappa confluentus =

Scientific classification
- Kingdom: Animalia
- Phylum: Chordata
- Class: Actinopterygii
- Division: Teleostei
- Order: Gobiiformes
- Family: Oxudercidae
- Subfamily: Oxudercinae
- Genus: Zappa; Murdy, 1989
- Species: Z. confluentus

Binomial name
- Zappa confluentus (T. R. Roberts, 1978)

Species of fish

Zappa confluentus, the New Guinea slender mudskipper, is a mudskipper endemic to New Guinea, where it is only known from the lower parts of the Fly, Ramu Rivers. It is found on mudflats adjacent to turbid rivers. This species can reach a length of 4.4 centimetres (1.7 in) SL.

== Etymology ==
Zappa was named after musician Frank Zappa "for his articulate and sagacious defense of the First Amendment of the U.S. Constitution".

== See also ==
- List of organisms named after famous people (born 1925–1949)
