= Parapocryptes =

Scientific classification
- Kingdom: Animalia
- Phylum: Chordata
- Class: Actinopterygii
- Order: Gobiiformes
- Family: Oxudercidae
- Subfamily: Oxudercinae
- Genus: Parapocryptes; Bleeker, 1874

Type species
- Apocryptes macrolepis as a synonym of Parapocryptes serperaster Bleeker, 1851

Genus of fishes

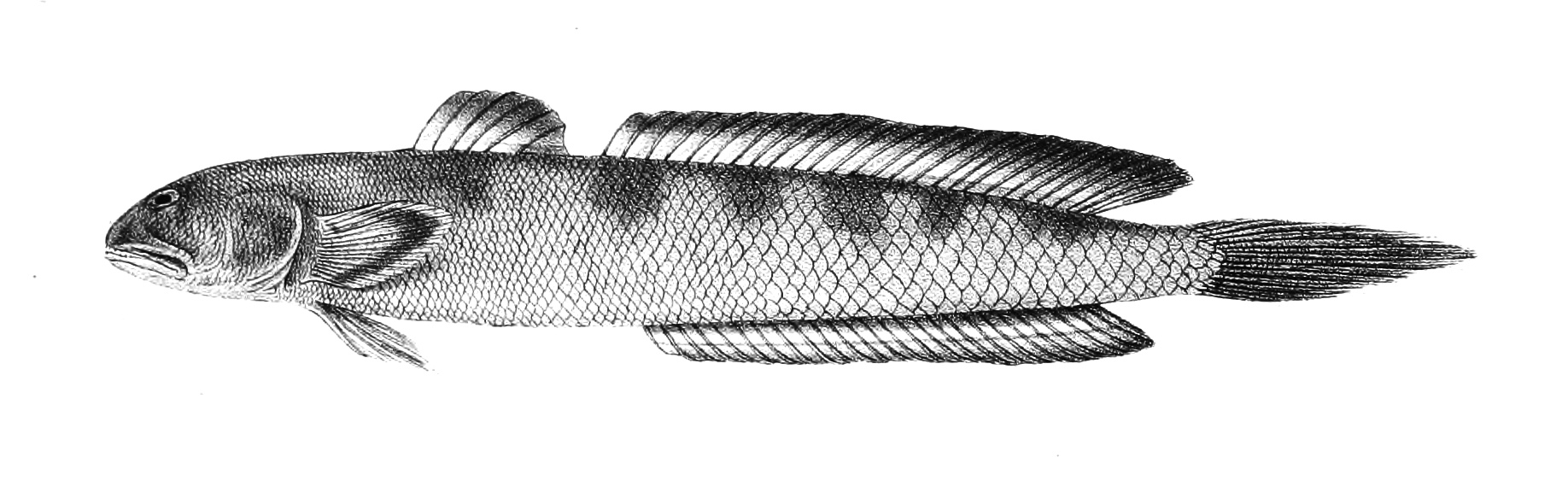
Parapocryptes serperaster

Parapocryptes is a genus of gobies native to the Indian Ocean and the western Pacific Ocean.

== Species ==
There are currently two recognized species in this genus:

- Parapocryptes rictuosus (Valenciennes, 1837)
- Parapocryptes serperaster (J. Richardson, 1846)

== Relationship to humans ==
In Thailand Parapocryptes was called pla thong thew (Thai: ปลาท่องเที่ยว; literally: "travel fish"). Because not sedentary behaviors, and Travel fish are fish that can be used for cooking. The Travel fish season lasts from October to December every year. Because it is the monsoon season, it causes the most fish to come out. As a result, fishermen around Songkhla Lake flock to catch to travel fish to sell. The most common place to sell travel fish is at the Kuan Niang fresh market. Khuan Niang district Songkhla Province Southern Thailand which fish travel It is a good product of Khuan Niang District.
