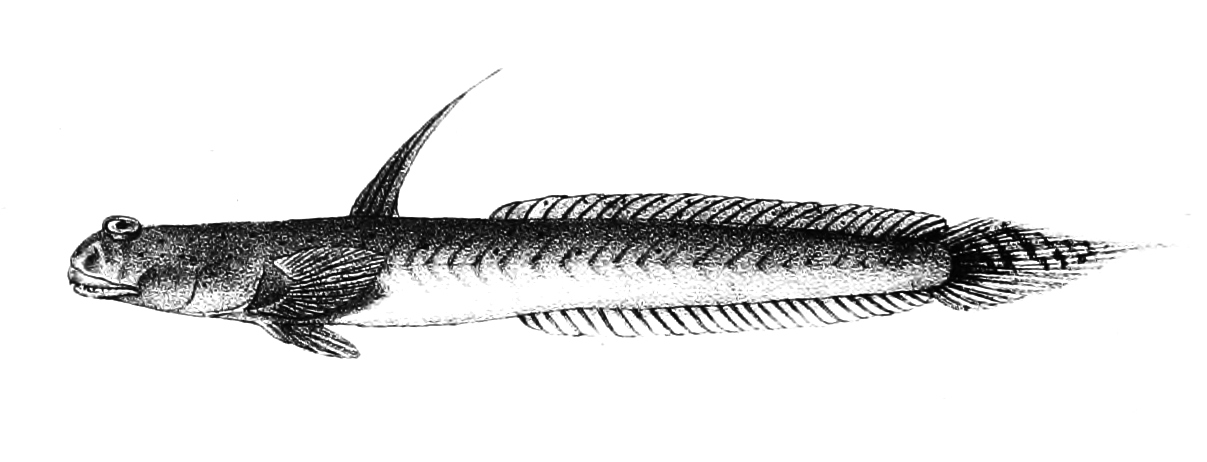

Scientific classification
- Kingdom: Animalia
- Phylum: Chordata
- Class: Actinopterygii
- Order: Gobiiformes
- Family: Oxudercidae
- Genus: Scartelaos
- Species: S. histophorus

Binomial name
- Scartelaos histophorus Valenciennes, 1837

Synonyms
- Boleophthalmus histophorus Valenciennes, 1837; Gobius viridis Hamilton, 1822; Boleophthalmus viridis (Hamilton, 1822); Scartelaos viridis (Hamilton, 1822); Boleophthalmus sinicus Valenciennes, 1837; Boleophthalmus chinensis Valenciennes, 1837; Boleophthalmus aucupatorius Richardson, 1845; Boleophthalmus campylostomus Richardson, 1846; Apocryptes macrophthalmus Castelnau, 1873; Gobiosoma guttulatum Macleay, 1878; Gobiosoma punctularum De Vis, 1884; Boleophthalmus novaeguineae Hase, 1914; Boleophthalmus novaeguinea Hase, 1914

= Scartelaos histophorus =

Species of fish

Scartelaos histophorus, commonly known as the walking goby, is a species of fish in the family Oxudercidae. This species is notable for its unique ability to "walk" on land, using its pectoral fins to propel itself forwards. Walking gobies are typically found in shallow coastal waters, such as mudflats, estuaries, and mangrove areas, in the Indo-Pacific region.

Scartelaos histophorus ability to move on land helps it to migrate between different tidal pools and avoid predators in their aquatic environment. This behavior is part of a broader adaptation to fluctuating environments, where the fish may need to move between water bodies when the tide goes out. Walking gobies can also breathe air, which further aids in their survival in low-oxygen environments.
