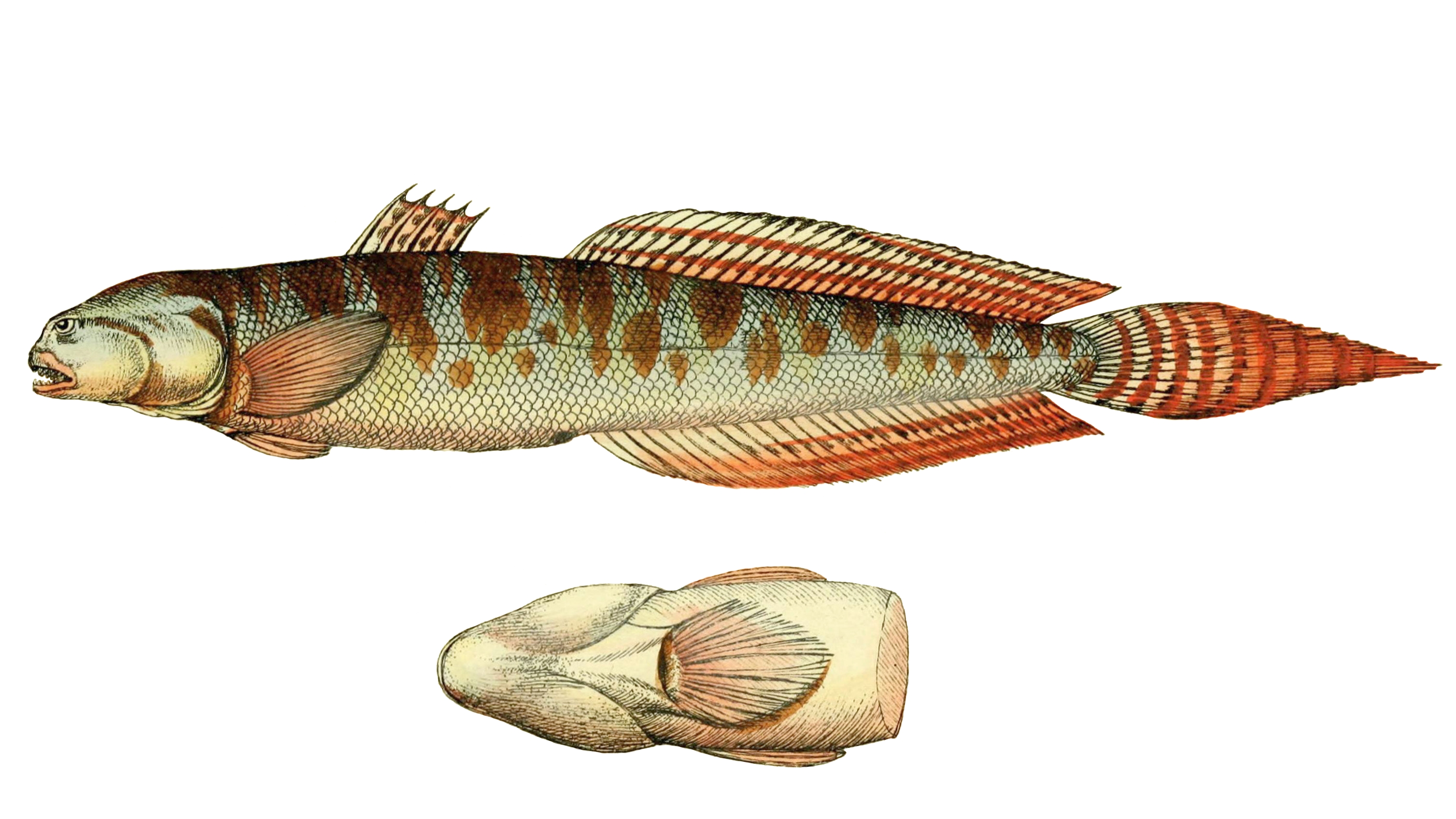

Conservation status
- Least Concern (IUCN 3.1)

Scientific classification
- Kingdom: Animalia
- Phylum: Chordata
- Class: Actinopterygii
- Order: Gobiiformes
- Family: Oxudercidae
- Genus: Pseudapocryptes
- Species: P. elongatus

Binomial name
- Pseudapocryptes elongatus (Cuvier, 1816)

Synonyms
- List: Apocryptes changua (Hamilton, 1822); Apocryptes dentatus Valenciennes, 1837; Apocryptes lanceolatus (Bloch & Schneider, 1801); Apocryptodon edwardi Fowler, 1937; Aprocryptodon edwardi Fowler, 1937; Boleophthalmus taylori Fowler, 1934; Eleotris lanceolata Bloch & Schneider, 1801; Gobius changua Hamilton, 1822; Gobius elongatus Cuvier, 1816; Pseudapocryptes lanceolatus (Bloch & Schneider, 1801); Pseudopocryptes elongatus (Cuvier, 1816)

= Pseudapocryptes elongatus =

Species of goby

Pseudapocryptes elongatus, the elongate mudskipper, is a species of goby belonging to the family Oxudercidae.

== Gallery ==
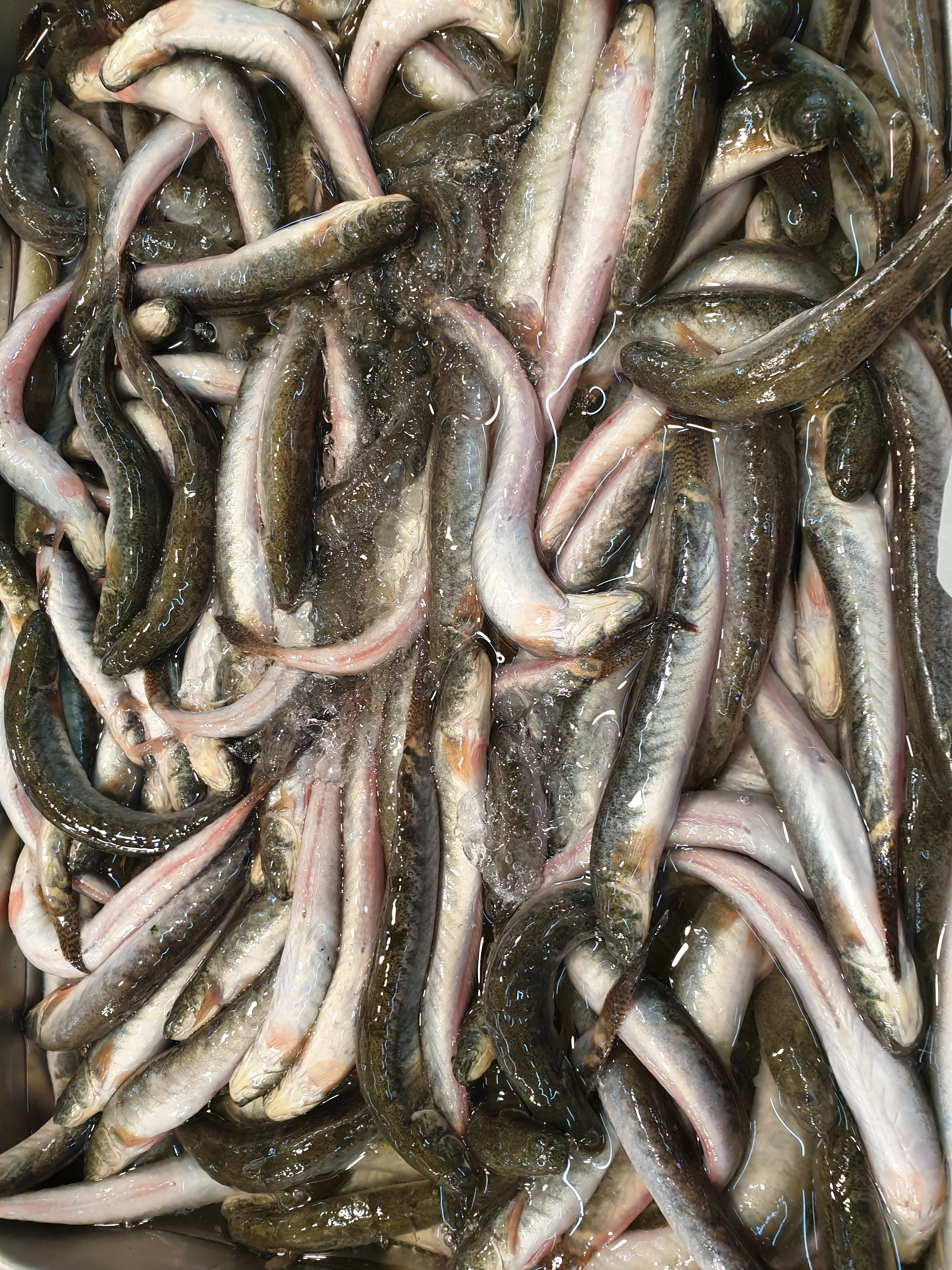

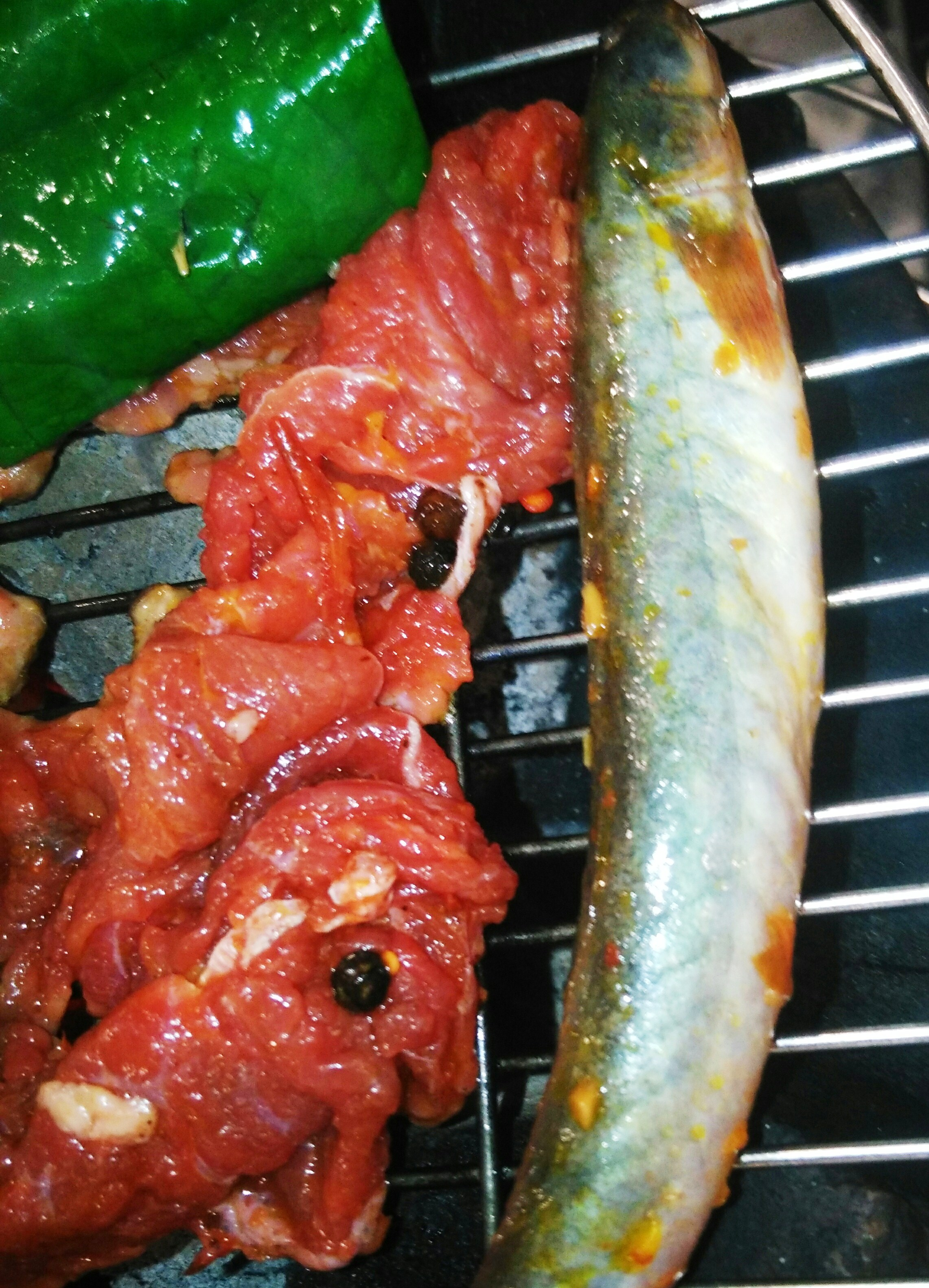

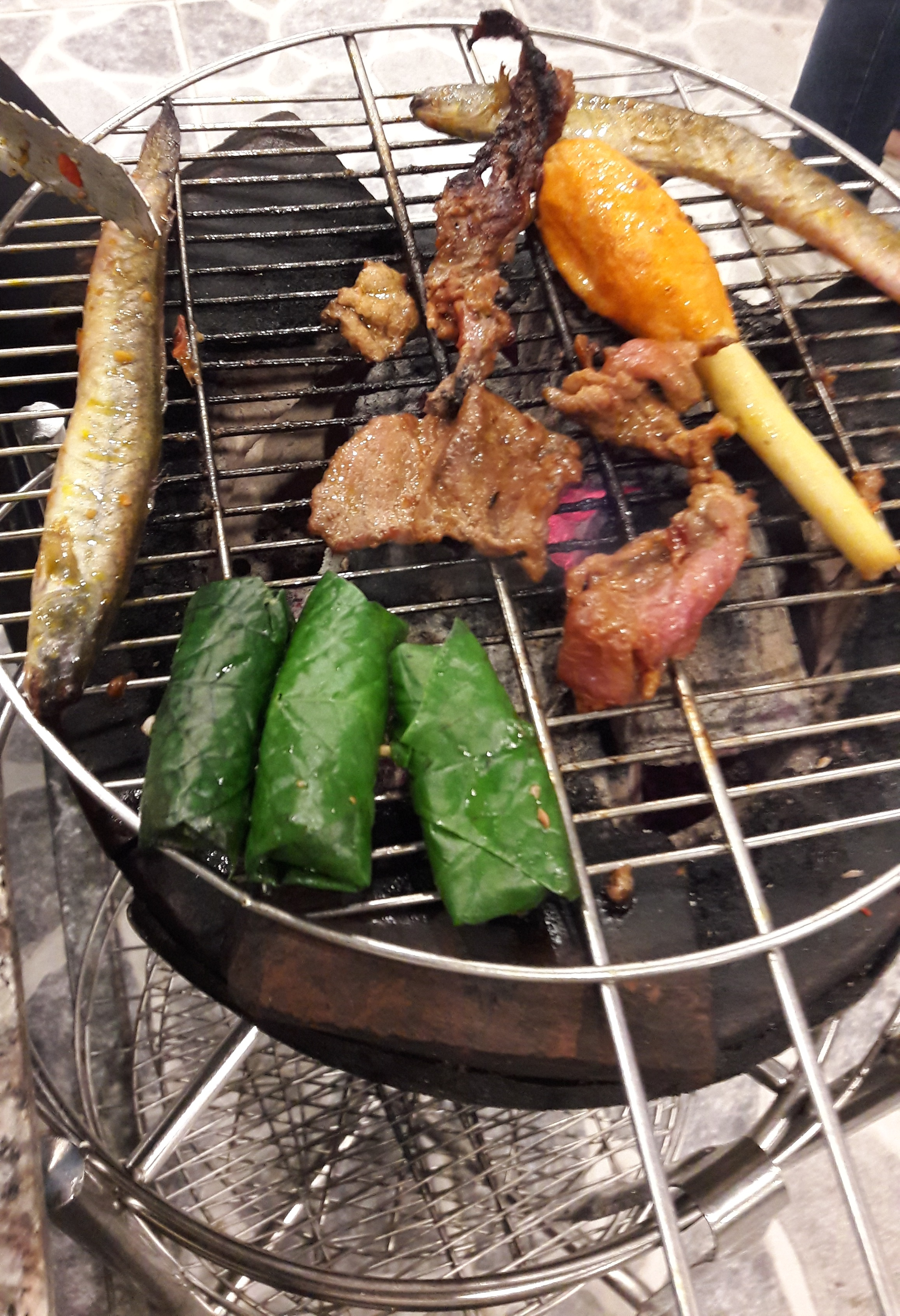

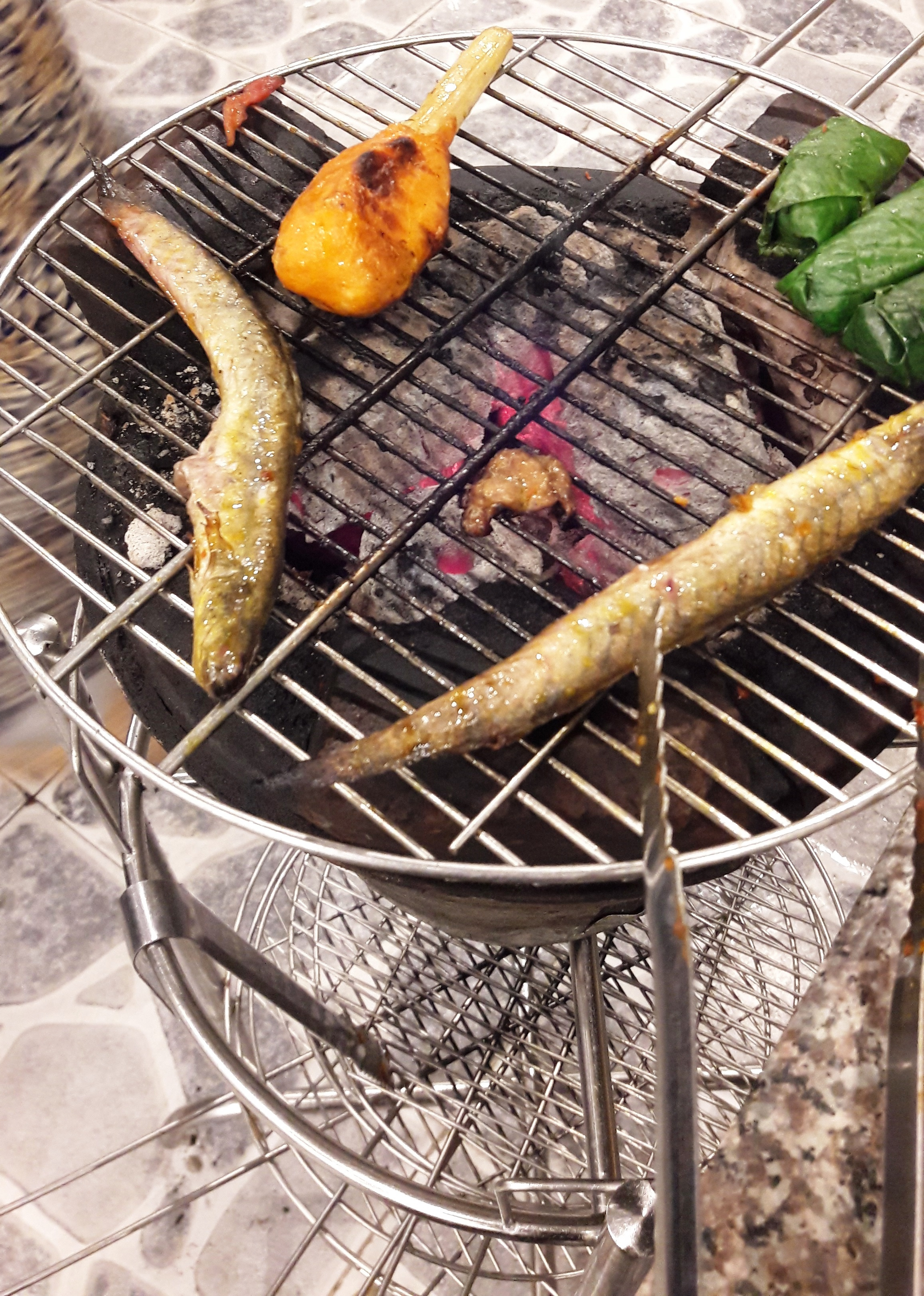
