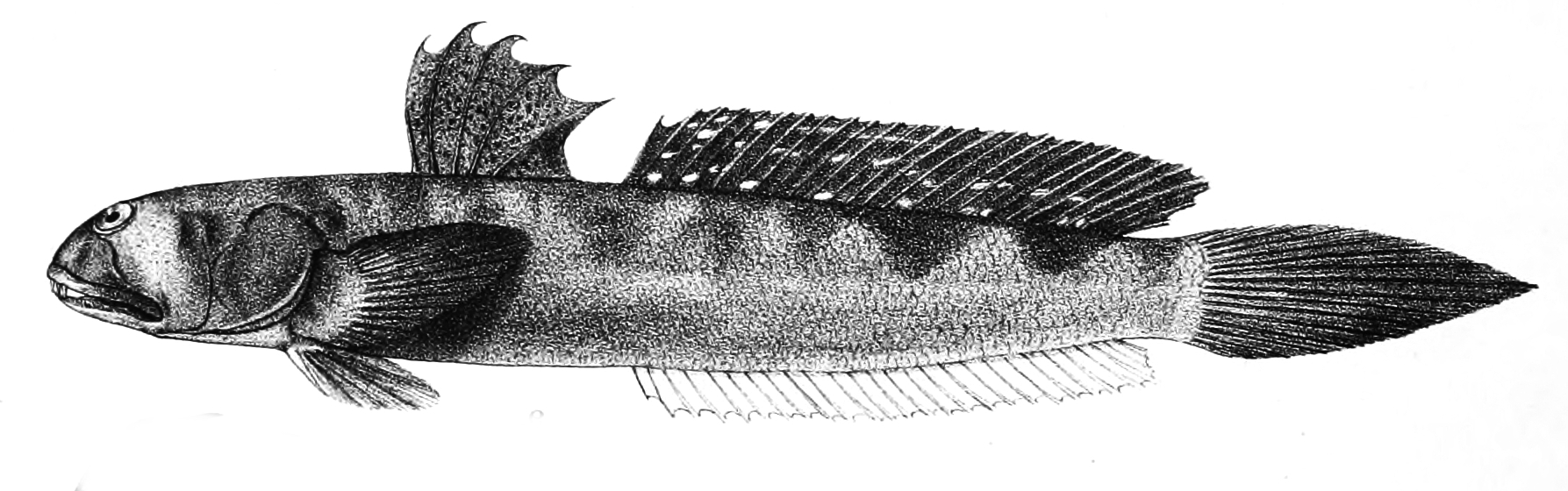

Scientific classification
- Domain: Eukaryota
- Kingdom: Animalia
- Phylum: Chordata
- Class: Actinopterygii
- Order: Gobiiformes
- Family: Oxudercidae
- Genus: Boleophthalmus
- Species: B. dussumieri

Binomial name
- Boleophthalmus dussumieri (Valenciennes, 1837)

Synonyms
- Boleophthalmus dentatus Valenciennes, 1837; Boleophthalmus chamiri Holly, 1929

= Boleophthalmus dussumieri =

Species of fish

Boleophthalmus dussumieri, Dussumier's mudskipper, is a species of mudskipper native to the Indian Ocean where it can be found on mudflats in fresh, brackish and marine waters of Iraq, Pakistan and India as well as probably in Bangladesh. This species can reach a length of 18.7 centimetres (7.4 in) TL.

The specific name honours the French explorer and trader Jean-Jacques Dussumier (1792-1883).

== Bibliography ==
- Anònim, 2001. Base de dades de la col·lecció de peixos del National Museum of Natural History (Smithsonian Institution). Smithsonian Institution - Division of Fishes.
- Eschmeyer, William N.: Genera of Recent Fishes. California Academy of Sciences. San Francisco, California, United States. iii + 697. ISBN 0-940228-23-8. Any 1990.
- Eschmeyer, William N., ed. 1998. Catalog of Fishes. Special Publication of the Center for Biodiversity Research and Information, núm. 1, vol. 1–3. California Academy of Sciences. San Francisco, California, United States. ISBN 0-940228-47-5.
- Helfman, G., B. Collette i D. Facey: The diversity of fishes. Blackwell Science, Malden, Massachusetts, United States, 1997.
- Hoese, D.F. 1986: Gobiidae. p. 774-807. A: M.M. Smith i P.C. Heemstra (eds.) Smiths' sea fishes. Springer-Verlag, Berlín.
- Khuda Bukhsh, A.R. i A. Barat, 1984. Somatic and germinal chromosomes of a gobiid, Boleophthalmus dentatus. Life Sci. Adv. 3(2-3): 146–148.
- Martin, K.L.M. i C.R. Bridges, 1999. Respiration in water and air. p. 54-78. A: M.H. Horn, K.L.M. Martin i M.A. Chotkowski (eds.) Intertidal fishes. Life in two worlds. Academic Press. 399 p.
- Moyle, P. i J. Cech.: Fishes: An Introduction to Ichthyology, 4th. edition, Upper Saddle River, New Jersey, United States: Prentice-Hall. Any 2000.
- Murdy, E.O., 1989. A taxonomic revision and cladistic analysis of the Oxudercine gobies (Gobiidae: Oxudercinae). Records of the Australian Museum Supplement 11:93 p.
- Nelson, J.S. 2006: Fishes of the world. Quarta edition. John Wiley & Sons, Inc. Hoboken, New Jersey, United States. 601 p.
- Riede, K., 2004. Global register of migratory species - from global to regional scales. Final Report of the R&D-Projekt 808 05 081. Federal Agency for Nature Conservation, Bonn, Germany. 329 p.
- Wheeler, A.: The World Encyclopedia of Fishes, 2nd. edition, Londres: Macdonald. Any 1985.
- Wu, H.L., K.-T. Shao i C.F. Lai (eds.), 1999. Latin-Chinese dictionary of fishes names. The Sueichan Press, Taiwan.
