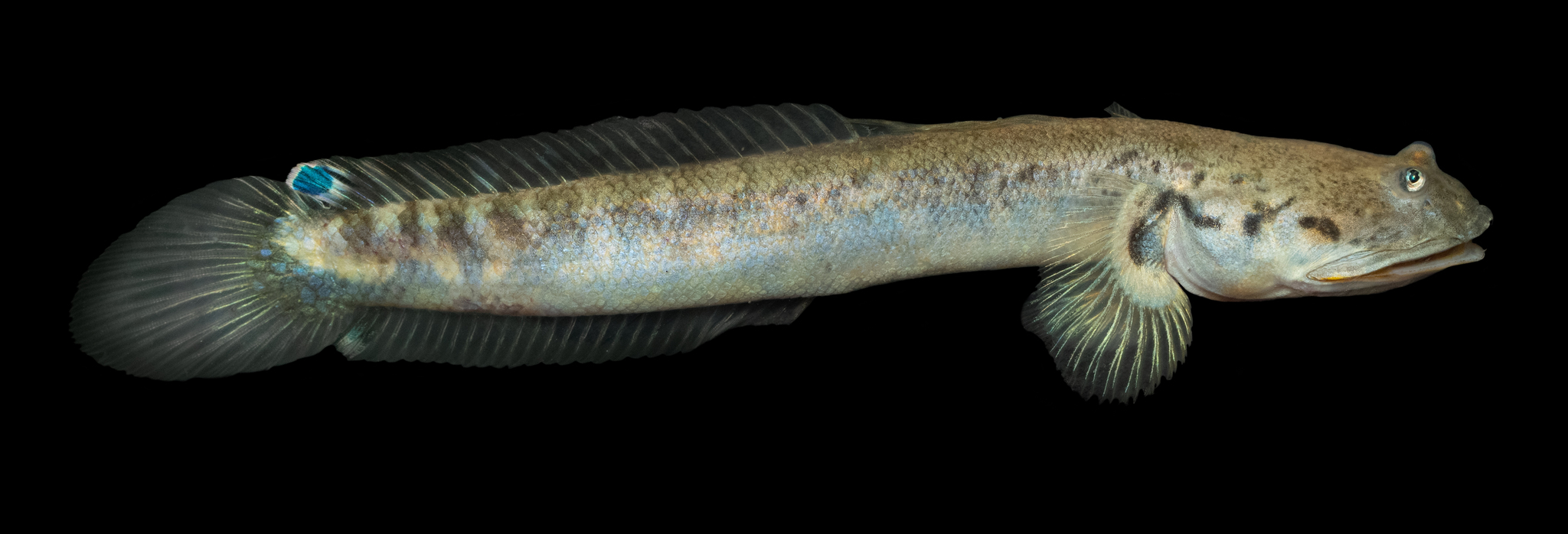

Scientific classification
- Domain: Eukaryota
- Kingdom: Animalia
- Phylum: Chordata
- Class: Actinopterygii
- Order: Gobiiformes
- Family: Oxudercidae
- Genus: Oxuderces
- Species: O. wirzi

Binomial name
- Oxuderces wirzi (Koumans, 1937)

Synonyms
- Apocryptodon wirzi Koumans, 1937

= Wirz's goby =

Species of fish

Wirz's goby (Oxuderces wirzi) is a species of goby found in Oceania from Papua New Guinea and northern Australia.

== Description ==
This species reaches a length of 10.5 cm (4.1 in).

== Etymology ==
The fish is named in honor of a "Dr. Wirz", who collected the type specimen., probably referring to Swiss anthropologist Paul Wirz (1892-1955).
