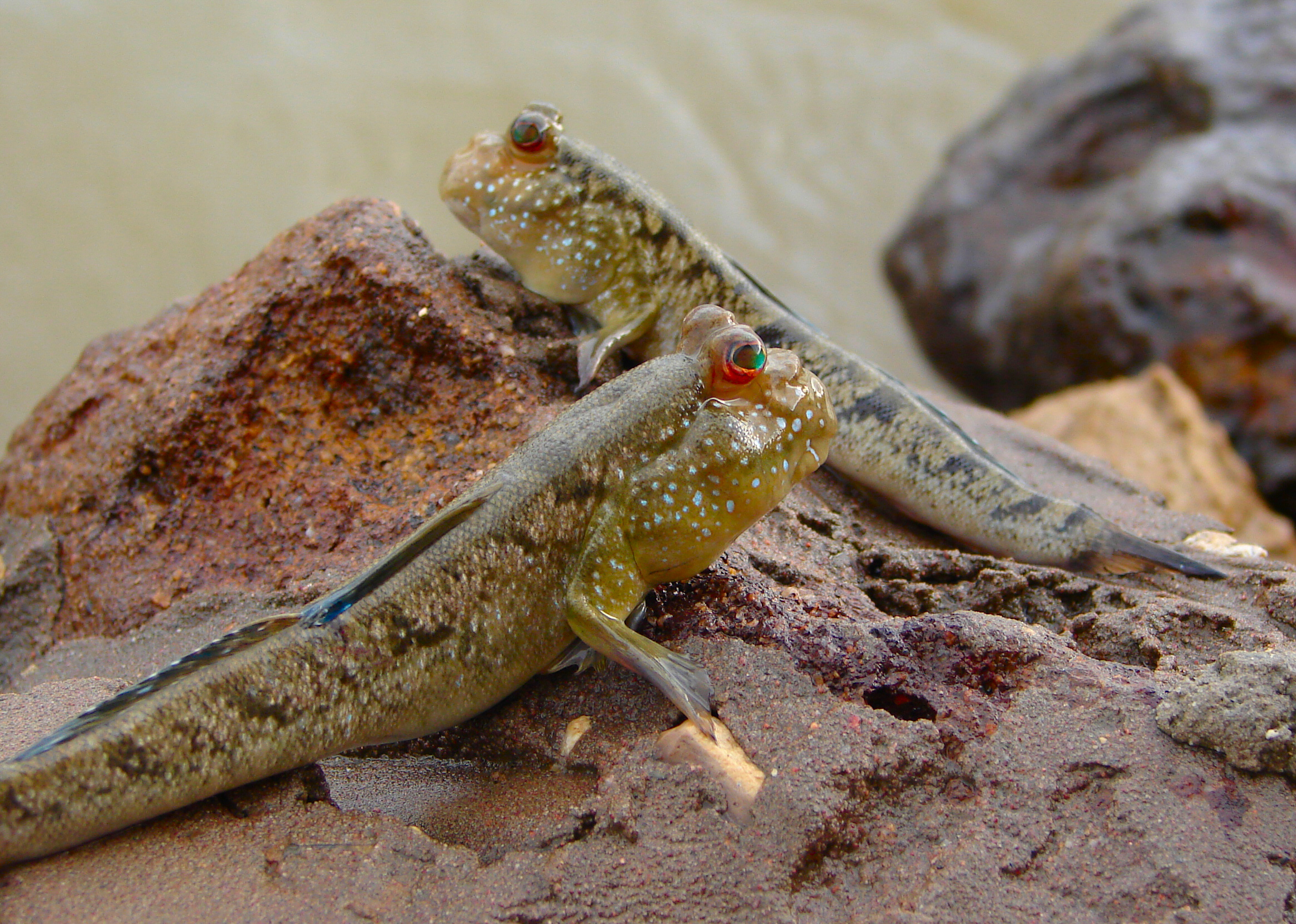
- Atlantic mudskipper (Periophthalmus barbarus) in The Gambia

Scientific classification
- Kingdom: Animalia
- Phylum: Chordata
- Class: Actinopterygii
- Division: Teleostei
- Order: Gobiiformes
- Family: Oxudercidae
- Subfamily: Oxudercinae; Gunther 1861

Genera
- Apocryptes; Apocryptodon; Boleophthalmus; Oxuderces; Parapocryptes; Periophthalmodon; Periophthalmus; Pseudapocryptes; Scartelaos; Zappa

Synonyms
- Periophthalminae

= Mudskipper =

Subfamily of fish

Mudskippers are any of the 25 extant species of amphibious fish from the subfamily Oxudercinae of the goby family Oxudercidae. They are known for their unusual body shapes, preferences for semiaquatic habitats, limited terrestrial locomotion and jumping, and the ability to survive prolonged periods of time both in and out of water.

Mudskippers can grow up to 30 cm (12 in) long, and most are a brownish green colour that ranges anywhere from dark to light. During mating seasons, the males will also develop brightly coloured spots in order to attract females, which can be red, green, or blue. Unlike other fish, the mudskipper's eyes protrude from the top of its flat head. Another notable feature is that their side pectoral fins are located more forward and underneath their elongated bodies. These fins are jointed and function similarly to limbs, which allow the mudskipper to crawl from place to place. Although they have the typical body form of any other gobiid fish, pectoral fins allow the mudskipper to actively "skip" across muddy surfaces (hence the common name) and even climb low-hanging tree branches and scrub. Mudskippers can leap distances of up to 61 centimetres (24 in) by laterally flexing and pushing with their tails.

== Taxonomy ==
Oxudercinae is sometimes classified within the family Gobiidae (gobies). Recent molecular studies do not support this classification, as oxudercine gobies appear to be paraphyletic relative to amblyopine gobies (Gobiidae: Amblyopinae), thus being included in a distinct "Periophthalmus lineage", together with amblyopines. Mudskippers can be defined as oxudercine gobies that are "fully terrestrial for some portion of the daily cycle" (character 24 in Murdy, 1989). This would define the species of the genera Boleophthalmus, Periophthalmodon, Periophthalmus, and Scartelaos as "mudskippers". However, field observations of Zappa confluentus suggest that this monotypic genus should be included in the definition.

== Behavior ==
Mudskippers typically live in burrows in intertidal habitats, and exhibit unique adaptations to this environment that are not found in most intertidal fishes, which typically survive the retreat of the tide by hiding under wet seaweed or in tide pools. These burrows are most often characterised by their smooth and vaulted ceilings. The way the males dig these burrows has been found to be directly linked to their ability to survive submerged in almost anoxic water. It has also been found to play a crucial role in the development of the eggs within the burrow. Mudskippers are quite active when out of water, feeding and interacting with one another, for example, to defend their territories and court potential partners. Once the male has completed digging his burrow he will resurface and will begin attempting to attract a female through assorted yet typical displays. These displays consist of body undulations, different postures and energetic movements. Once the female has made her choice she will then proceed to follow the male into the burrow where she will lay hundreds of eggs and allow them to be fertilized. After fertilization occurs, the period of cohabitation between the male and female is rather short. Eventually, the female will leave and it is the male that ends up guarding the egg-filled burrow from predators.

Mudskippers are amphibious. When leaving the water and moving into a more dry environment on land, they are still able to breathe using water that is trapped inside their large gill chambers. They are also able to absorb oxygen from the lining of their mouth and throat, allowing them to stay out of water for long periods of time. It has been discovered that they spend up to three quarters of their life on land. They are found in tropical, subtropical, and temperate regions, including the Indo-Pacific and the Atlantic coast of Africa.

== Adaptations ==
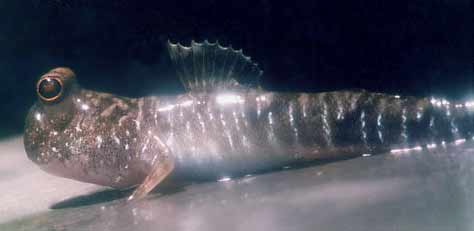
Periophthalmus gracilis (from Malaysia to northern Australia)

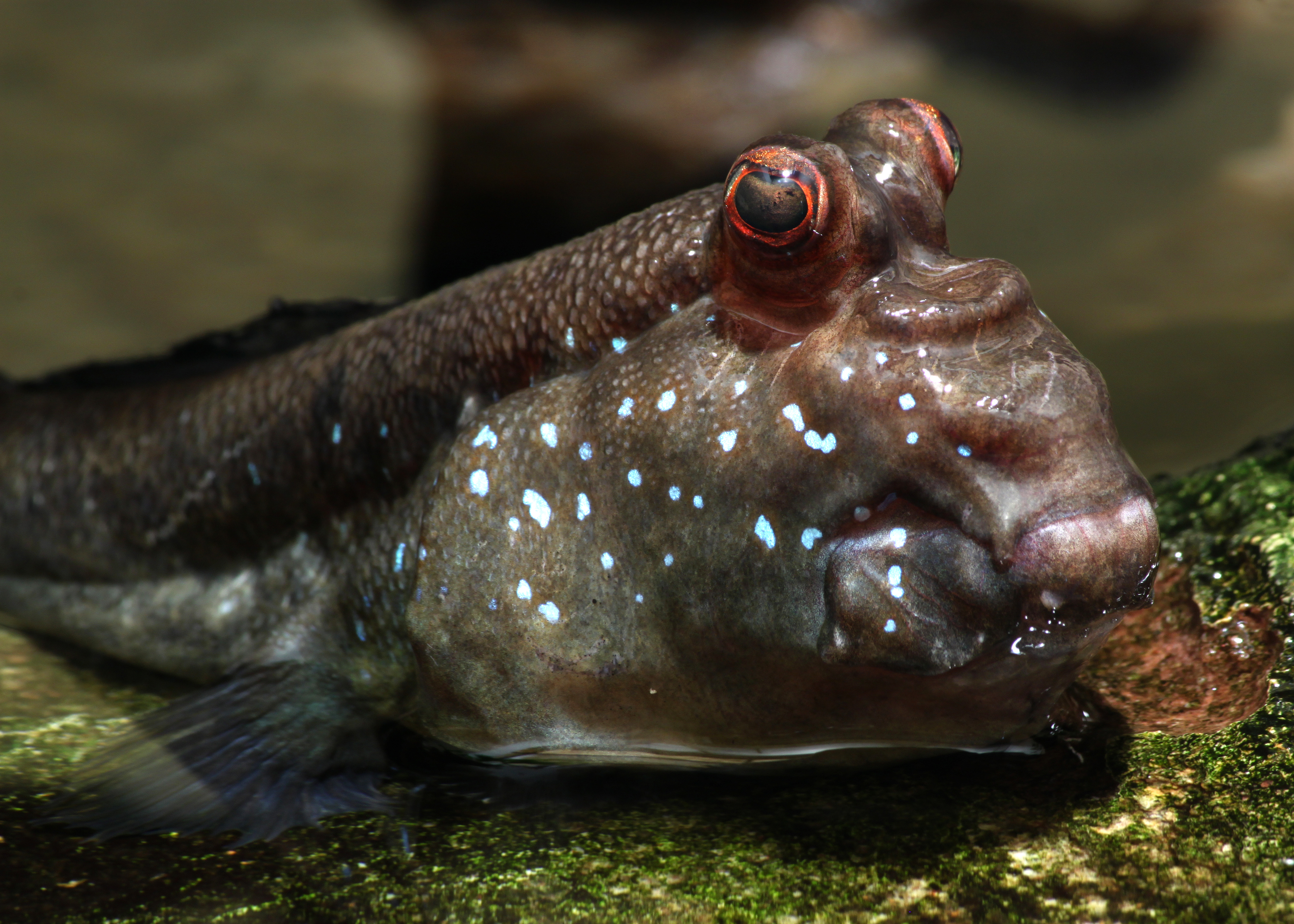
Periophthalmus barbarus (from western Africa)

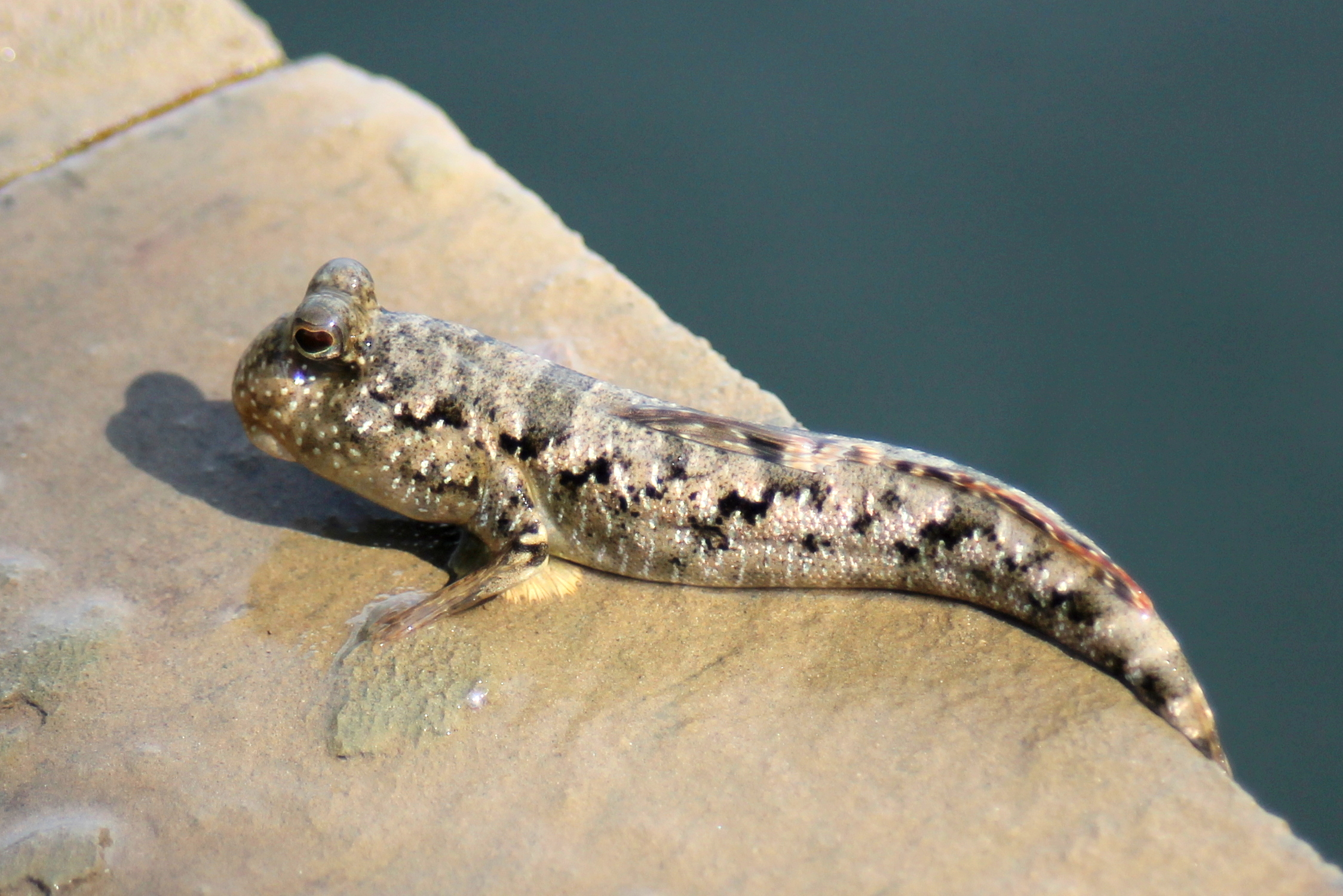
Barred mudskipper (Periophthalmus argentilineatus)

Compared with fully aquatic gobies, these specialised fish present a range of anatomical and ethological adaptations that allow them to move effectively on land as well as in the water.

=== Terrestrial movement ===
As their name implies, these fish use their fins to move around in a series of skips.

Although mudskippers' fins do not have a joint homologous to the elbow, the joint between the radials and the fin rays serves a functionally analogous role.

— Integrative and Comparative Biology

The mudskipper pectoral fin differs from most actinopterygian fishes in that the radials of the mudskipper pectoral fin are elongated and protrude from the body wall. This unusual morphology creates a pectoral fin with two fin segments (the radials and the rays) and two movable hinge joints: a 'shoulder' joint where the cleithrum meets the radials and an 'intra-fin' joint where the radials meet the rays. In addition, ... the abductor superficialis muscle of the pectoral fin is divided into two sections (rather than being a single muscle, as is common with the rest of the Oxudercinae gobies) with one section inserting on the dorsal rays and the other section inserting on the ventral rays.

— The Journal of Experimental Biology

=== Breathing ===
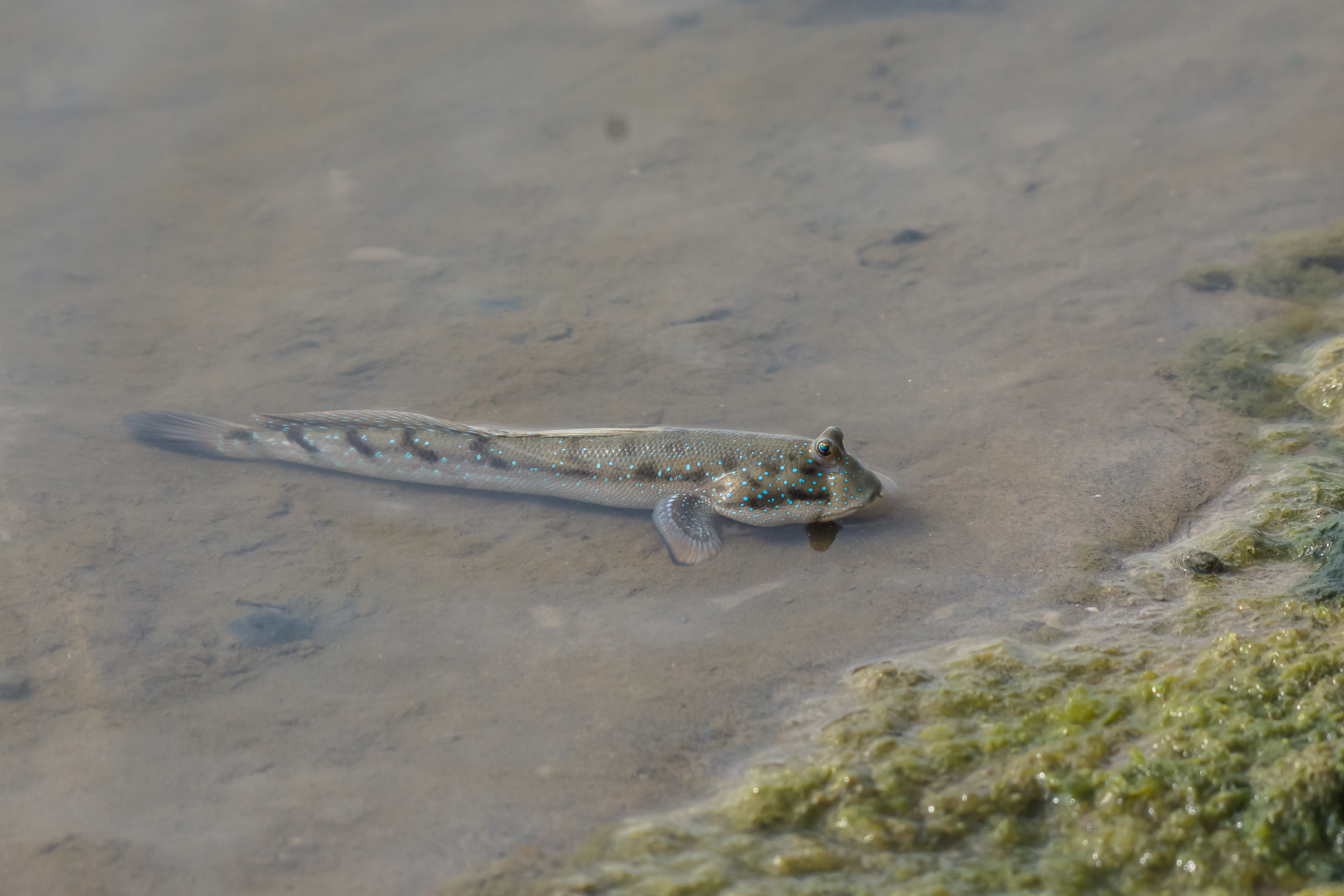
Mudskipper at Point Calimere Sanctuary, Tamil Nadu, India

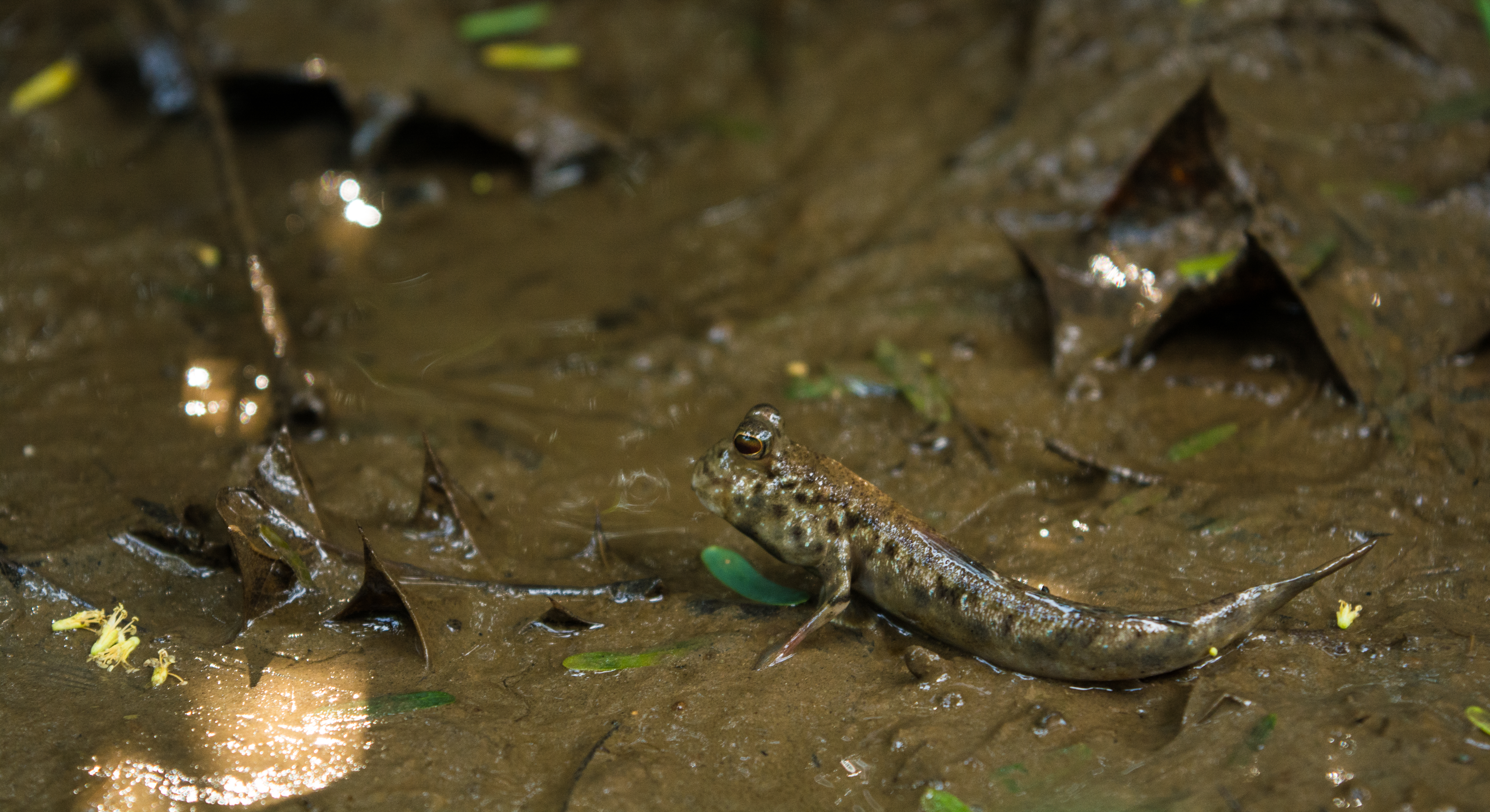
Mudskipper at Coringa Mangrove Sanctuary, Andhra Pradesh, India

Periophthalmodon septemradiatus territorial defense call and jumping ability

Mudskippers have the ability to breathe through their skin and the lining of their mouth (the mucosa) and throat (the pharynx); this is only possible when the mudskippers are wet, limiting them to humid habitats and requiring that they keep themselves moist. The ability to breathe through their skin is associated with increased capillary density in their skin. This mode of breathing, similar to that employed by amphibians, is known as cutaneous respiration. Another important adaptation that aids breathing while out of water is their enlarged gill chambers, where they retain a bubble of air. These chambers close tightly when the fish is above water, due to a ventromedial valve of the gill slit, keeping the gills moist, and allowing them to function while exposed to air. Gill filaments are stiff and do not coalesce when out of water.

=== Diet ===
The different species have adapted to various diets on the mudflats. Boleophthalmus boddarti is detritivorous, while others will eat small crabs, insects, snails and even other mudskippers.

=== Burrowing ===
Digging deep burrows in soft sediments allows the fish to thermoregulate, avoid marine predators during the high tide when the fish and burrow are submerged, and lay their eggs. When the burrow is submerged, several mudskipper species maintain an air pocket inside it, which allows them to breathe in conditions of very low oxygen concentration.

=== Ammonia regulation ===
To reduce toxic ammonia production, mudskippers can suppress amino acid breakdown when exposed to air. Another method they use involves the partial breakdown of amino acids leading to the production of alanine, which also reduces ammonia production.

Mudskippers can reduce the membrane permeability of their skin and acidify the water in their burrows to reduce levels of ammonia from the environment.

=== Blinking ===
Mudskippers evolved the ability to blink independently from terrestrial tetrapods. Their eyes are located high on their head compared to other gobies, and they blink by lowering their eyes as a membrane called the dermal cup rises to cover them. Although other fully aquatic goby species do not have the ability to blink, mudskippers did not evolve different muscles or glands to blink with; their blinking is accomplished with the same muscles in a different configuration. Rather than having specialized glands to produce eye lubricant, the fluid film on their cornea is likely composed of mucus secreted by their skin and water from their environment, possibly stored in the infraorbital space behind the dermal cup membrane. Mudskippers likely evolved blinking in response to conditions of terrestrial life, such as to keep their eyes wet out of water (they blink more frequently in high evaporation conditions and only when colliding with things in water) and to clean and protect the eye from debris, which may adhere to the eye or approach at a faster, more dangerous speed when in air versus when in water. Their eyes are not elevated when they are still juveniles, which are fully aquatic.

== Species ==
The genus Periophthalmus is by far the most diverse and widespread genus of mudskipper. Eighteen species have been described. Periophthalmus argentilineatus is one of the most widespread and well-known species. It can be found in mangrove ecosystems and mudflats of East Africa and Madagascar east through the Sundarbans of Bengal, Southeast Asia to Northern Australia, southeast China, Taiwan, and the Ryukyus, to Samoa and Tonga Islands. It grows to a length of about 9.5 cm and is a carnivorous opportunist feeder. It feeds on small prey such as small crabs and other arthropods. However, a recent molecular study suggests that P. argentilineatus is in fact a complex of species, with at least three separate lineages, one in East Africa, and two in the Indo-Malayan region. Another species, Periophthalmus barbarus, is the only oxudercine goby that inhabits the coastal areas of western Africa.
