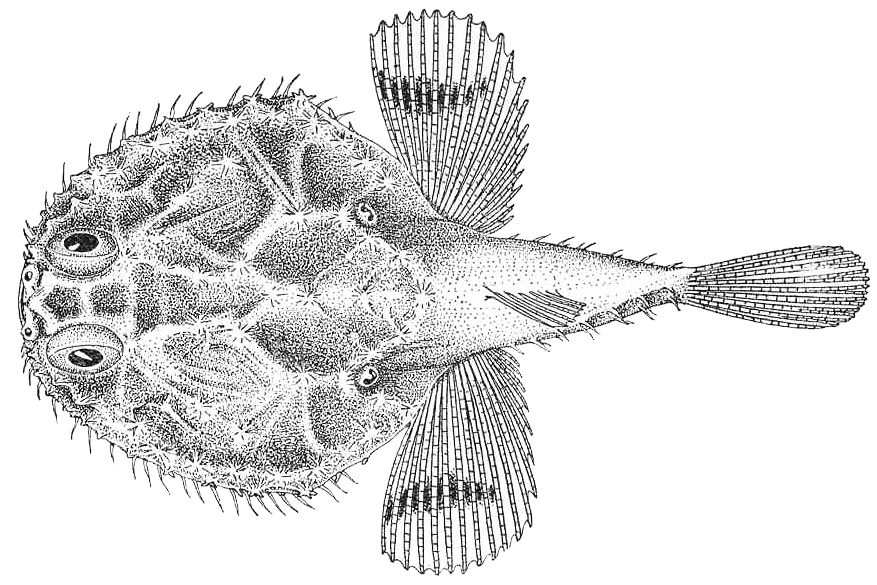

Conservation status
- Least Concern (IUCN 3.1)

Scientific classification
- Kingdom: Animalia
- Phylum: Chordata
- Class: Actinopterygii
- Order: Lophiiformes
- Family: Ogcocephalidae
- Genus: Halieutichthys
- Species: H. caribbaeus

Binomial name
- Halieutichthys caribbaeus Garman, 1896

Synonyms
- Halieutichthys smithii Evermann & Marsh, 1900

= Caribbean batfish =

Species of fish

The Caribbean batfish (Halieutichthys caribbaeus), also known as the two-spine batfish, is a species of marine ray-finned fish belonging to the family Ogcocephalidae, the deep sea batfishes or seabats. This species is found in the Western Atlantic Ocean.

== Taxonomy ==
The Caribbean batfish was first formally described in 1896 by the American ichthyologist Samuel Garman with its type locality given as Barbados to Jamaica in the West Indies. This species is the sister taxon to the aculeatus species complex which includes H. aculeatus, H. bispinosus and H. intermedius. This taxon may also actually represent a species complex with a number of undescribed species within it. The genus Halieutichthys is classified within the "Eastern Pacific/Western Atlantic clade" of the family Ogcocephalidae. The family Ogcocephalidae is classified in the monotypic suborder Ogcocephaloidei within the order Lophiiformes, the anglerfishes in the 5th edition of Fishes of the World.

== Etymology ==
The Caribbean batfish belongs to the genus Halieutichthys which combines the genus name Halieutaea, for the similarity of these fishes to the species in that genus, and ichthys, the Greek word for "fish". The specific name, caribbaeus, means "Caribbean", an allusion to the type locality.

== Description ==
The Caribbean batfish has a very flattened head and body which is widened into a rounded disc and a moderately long tail. The mouth is small and there is a small illicial cavity on the snout where the illicium. or fishing rod, is rested when not being used. The illicial cavity is covered on puffy, membranous folds and the esca, or lure, is bulbous. The buckler like scale at the angle of the operculum is not bigger than the similar scales nearby. The dorsal and anal fins are small and are positioned towards the rear of the body. The bases of pectoral fins have a wide attachment to the caudal peduncle and the pelvic fins not shrunken. The lateral line is unbroken and there are an additional pair of lateral line organs at the base of the tail to the rear of the anus. The lateral line has no tubercles associated with it. The scales are tubercles and they are large, irregular and pitted with few on the base of the tail. On the upper body the tubercles are rather small and sharp and there are typically none above the eye. There is a triangle of 3 tubercles behind each eye, the innermost being small and blunt. The underside of adults has no scales adults with and large scaleless areas on the uppermost part of the body. The overall color is greenish to light brown, with a thin pattern of pale reticulations on the upper body, The pectoral fins have 2 or 3 slender dark bars running across it, the outermost of these run across all of the fin. This species grows to a length of 8.8 cm (3.5 in).

== Distribution and habitat ==
The Caribbean batfish is found in the Western Atlantic Ocean from the Caribbean Sea to French Guiana. Reports of this species from the Gulf of Mexico and further north in the Atlantic are now considered to be misidentifications. This species is found at depths between 70 and 275 m (230 and 902 ft) on sand and rubble substrates on the lower continental and island shelves.
