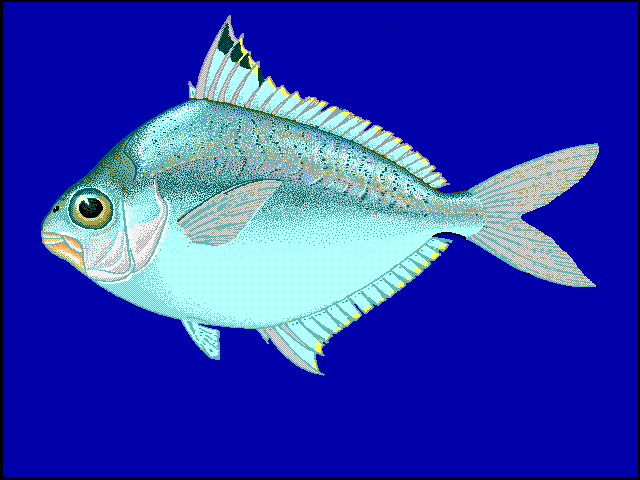

Conservation status
- Least Concern (IUCN 3.1)

Scientific classification
- Kingdom: Animalia
- Phylum: Chordata
- Class: Actinopterygii
- Order: Acanthuriformes
- Family: Leiognathidae
- Genus: Eubleekeria
- Species: E. splendens

Binomial name
- Eubleekeria splendens (Cuvier, 1829)

Synonyms
- Goomorah karah Russell, 1803; Equula splendens Cuvier, 1829; Leiognathus splendens (Cuvier, 1829); Equula gomorah Valenciennes, 1835; Equula ovalis De Vis, 1884; Eubleekeria ovalis (De Vis, 1884); Leiognathus ovalis (De Vis, 1884); Equula simplex De Vis, 1884; Equula argentea De Vis, 1884; Leiognathus spilotus Fowler, 1904; Leiognathus philippinus Fowler, 1918; Leiognathus devisi Whitley, 1929

= Eubleekeria splendens =

Species of fish

Eubleekeria splendens, common names splendid ponyfish and blacktip ponyfish, is a species of ponyfish.

== Description ==
Eubleekeria splendens has a head and body which is silvery white with yellow scales in the lateral line. There is a dark blotch on the spiny part of the dorsal fin. The soft rayed parts of the anal, dorsal and caudal fin are pale yellow and the pectoral fin as well as the spiny part of the anal fin are also pale yellow. There is sometimes a dark margin to the soft-rayed part of the dorsal fin. The pelvic fin is transparent. It lacks scales on its cheeks while the upper, anterior part of the body is almost entirely scaled and there is no semi circular naked area on nape like its congeners. The lower margin of inner ridge of the preoperculum is either smooth or has weak serrations. The second spines in both the dorsal and anal fins are robust. The dorsal fin contains 8 spines and 16 soft rays while the anal fin has 3 spines and 8 soft rays. This species is commonly found at 15 centimetres (5.9 in) in total length, but can grow to a length of 17 centimetres (6.7 in).

== Distribution ==
Eubleekeria splendens occurs in the Indo-West Pacific from India in the west, to Papua New Guinea and Fiji to the east, Japan to the north, down to Australia in the south. It has been recorded in the waters of such countries as Tanzania, Madagascar, Mauritius, and is also known to live in the Red Sea.

== Habitat and biology ==
Eubleekeria splendens lives in marine or brackish waters at a maximum depth of 100 metres. It is found in waters with a muddy or sandy mud substrate. It occurs near coasts and in estuaries. Smaller individuals may be found in mangrove creeks. It occurs in schools and feeds on smaller fish, crustaceans, foraminiferans, and bivalves, it is also known to feed on plants. In northern Australia spawning occurs in October.

== Utilisation ==
Eubleekeria splendens is subject to some fishing and is marketed in south-east Asia either fresh or preserved by drying and salting. It is also sometimes made into fish meal.

== Taxonomy ==
Eubleekeria splendens was first formally described as Equula splendens in 1829 by the French anatomist Georges Cuvier (1769–1823) with the type locality given as Chennai. It was placed within the subgenus Eubleekeria within the genus Leiognathus by Henry Weed Fowler in 1904. Within Leiognathus this species and L. jonesi and L. rapsoni, together with a new species L. kupanensis, were regarded as a species complex but Eubleekeria is now recognised as a valid genus with E. splendens as its type species.
