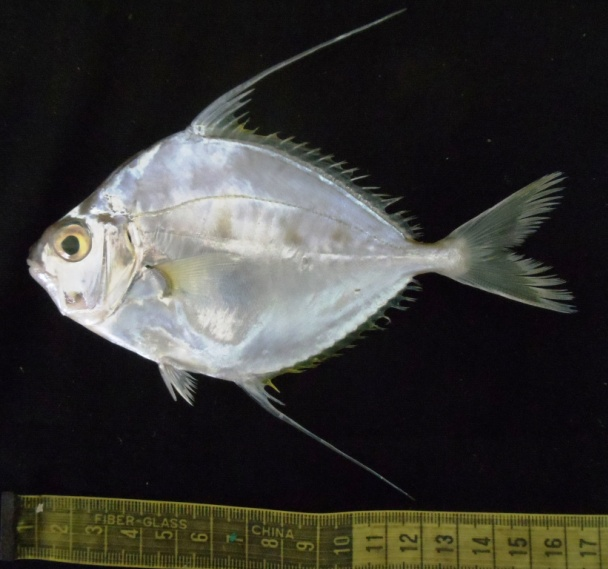

Conservation status
- Least Concern (IUCN 3.1)

Scientific classification
- Kingdom: Animalia
- Phylum: Chordata
- Class: Actinopterygii
- Order: Acanthuriformes
- Family: Leiognathidae
- Genus: Aurigequula
- Species: A. longispinis

Binomial name
- Aurigequula longispinis (Valenciennes, 1835)

Synonyms
- Equula longispinis Valenciennes, 1835; Leiognathus longispinis (Valenciennes, 1835); Equula smithursti (Ramsay and Ogilby, 1886); Leiognathus smithursti (Ramsay and Ogilby, 1886)

= Aurigequula longispinis =

Species of fish

Aurigequula longispinis, commonly known as the longspine- or Smithurst's ponyfish, is a fish of brackish and marine waters found in the Indian and western Pacific Oceans, from India through Malaysia and Indonesia south to northern Australia and east to the Philippines and Fiji It was described in 1835 by French Zoologist Achille Valenciennes from a specimen caught off Waigeo island in Irian Jaya in New Guinea. In 1886 Ramsay and Ogilby described what turned out to the same species from Hood Lagoon in Papua New Guinea, naming it Leiognathus smithursti. In 2008, ichthyologists Prosanta Chakrabarty and John S. Sparks resurrected the genus Aurigequula and placed L. longispinis and L. fasciatus in it, on the basis of a horizontal row of yellow markings on their flanks and elongated second spine of the dorsal fin. However, a molecular study showed that the genus Leiognathus was nested within Aurigequula, and hence the genera were merged once more.

The longspine ponyfish reaches a total length of 16 cm (6 1/4 in). It is distinguished by a long spine on both its dorsal and anal fin.

Found to depths of around 40 m (131 ft), the longspine ponyfish forages on the sea floor, generally in murky environs, consuming fish, crustaceans, arrow worms, nematodes, and shellfish such as bivalves, and gastropods.

Like all members of the ponyfish family, the longspine ponyfish is bioluminescent. The ventral surface glows, which is thought to provide camouflage and confuse predators.
