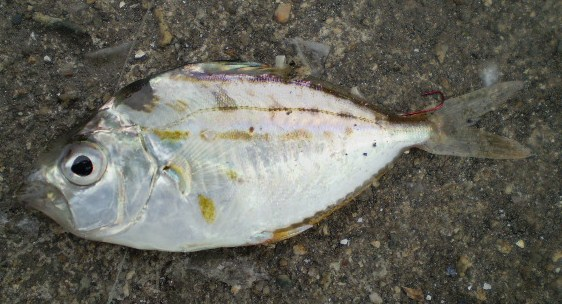
- Nuchequula nuchalis

Scientific classification
- Kingdom: Animalia
- Phylum: Chordata
- Class: Actinopterygii
- Order: Acanthuriformes
- Family: Leiognathidae
- Subfamily: Gazzinae
- Genus: Nuchequula; Whitley, 1932

Type species
- Equula blochii Valenciennes, 1835

= Nuchequula =

Genus of ray-finned fishes

Nuchequula is a genus of ponyfishes native to the Indian Ocean and the western Pacific Ocean.

== Species ==
There are currently seven recognized species in this genus:

- Nuchequula blochii (Valenciennes, 1835) - Twoblotch ponyfish
- Nuchequula flavaxilla Seishi Kimura, R. Kimura & Ikejima, 2008 - Yellowspotted ponyfish
- Nuchequula gerreoides (Bleeker, 1851) - Decorated ponyfish
- Nuchequula glenysae Seishi Kimura, R. Kimura & Ikejima, 2008
- Nuchequula longicornis Seishi Kimura, R. Kimura & Ikejima, 2008
- Nuchequula mannusella Chakrabarty & Sparks, 2007
- Nuchequula nuchalis (Temminck & Schlegel, 1845) - Spotnape ponyfish
