= Deveximentum =

- Deveximentum insidiator

Scientific classification
- Kingdom: Animalia
- Phylum: Chordata
- Class: Actinopterygii
- Order: Acanthuriformes
- Family: Leiognathidae
- Subfamily: Gazzinae
- Genus: Deveximentum; Fowler, 1904

Type species
- Zeus insidiator Bloch, 1787

Genus of ray-finned fishes

Deveximentum is a genus of ponyfishes native to the Indian Ocean and the western Pacific Ocean.

== Genus name ==
The genus had been once named as Secutor but Secutor was coined by Gistel in 1848 with Forsskål’s Scombrops equula as its type species, this being a synonym for Leiognathus equulus. In 1904 Fowler created the genus Deveximentum with Bloch’s Zeus insidiator as its type species. Catalog of Fishes states that as the type species for Secutor is synonymous with L. equulus then Secutor is a synonym of Leiognathus and prefers Fowler’s Deveximentum.

== Species ==
There are currently eight recognized species in this genus:

- Deveximentum hanedai (Mochizuki & Hayashi, 1989)
- Deveximentum indicium (Monkolprasit, 1973)
- Deveximentum insidiator (Bloch, 1787) (Pugnose ponyfish)
- Deveximentum interruptum (Valenciennes, 1835) (Pig-nosed ponyfish)
- Deveximentum mazavasaoka (Z. H. Baldwin & Sparks, 2011)
- Deveximentum megalolepis (Mochizuki & Hayashi, 1989) (Bigscale ponyfish)
- Deveximentum mekranense Alavi-Yeganeh, Khajavi & Kimura, 2021
- Deveximentum ruconius (F. Hamilton, 1822) (Deep pugnose ponyfish)
