= Nuchequula mannusella =

Scientific classification
- Kingdom: Animalia
- Phylum: Chordata
- Class: Actinopterygii
- Order: Acanthuriformes
- Family: Leiognathidae
- Genus: Nuchequula
- Species: N. mannusella

Binomial name
- Nuchequula mannusella Chakrabarty and Sparks, 2007

Species of fish

Nuchequula mannusella is a species of ponyfish native to the eastern Pacific Ocean near Taiwan. It was described as a new species as the genus was elevated from being classified as a subgenus of Leiognathus.

== Description ==
Nuchequula mannusella is a small fish, growing to around 8 cm (3.2 in) in length. They are completely covered in silvery scales with varying amounts of yellow coloration across all the fins. They have a dark nuchal marking.

== Etymology ==
The specific name, mannusella, references the common name of the family by combining "mannus", Latin for "pony" in reference to the common name of the family, and "sella", Latin for "saddle", referencing the nuchal marking.

== Taxonomic evaluation ==
Nuchequula manusella was found to be a sister taxon to every other species in the genus except for N. decora, which is sister to the entire genus.
