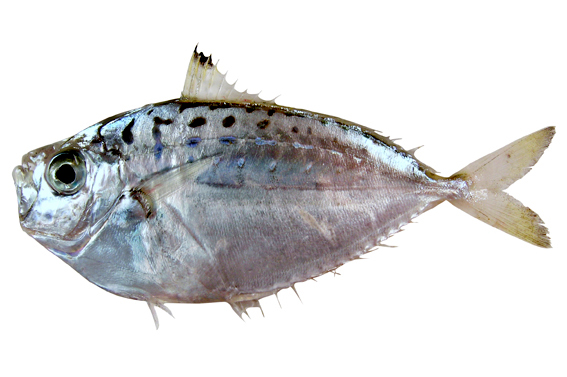

Conservation status
- Data Deficient (IUCN 3.1)

Scientific classification
- Kingdom: Animalia
- Phylum: Chordata
- Class: Actinopterygii
- Division: Teleostei
- Order: Acanthuriformes
- Family: Leiognathidae
- Genus: Deveximentum
- Species: D. insidiator

Binomial name
- Deveximentum insidiator (Bloch, 1787)

Synonyms
- Zeus insidiator Bloch, 1787; Equula insidiator (Bloch, 1787); Leiognathus insidiator (Bloch, 1787); Secutor insidiator (Bloch 1787)

= Deveximentum insidiator =

Species of fish

Deveximentum insidiator or previously Secutor insidiator, the pugnose ponyfish or barred ponyfish, is a species of ray-finned fish, a ponyfish in the family Leiognathidae. The barred ponyfish's mineralized skeleton contains apatite and the mineralized tissue contains hydroxylapatite. They have bare heads with nuchal spines and their bodies are a distinctive, reflective silver, frequently imitated by fishermen using silver lures. They have a protracted mouth pointing upward and the tip of the maxilla reaches well below the level of the lower margin of the eye. Barred ponyfish feed on zooplankton, including larval fishes and crustaceans. Body depth is twice or slightly more than standard length, which measures 11.3 cm (4.4 in) from the tip of the snout to last vertebra. The lateral line ends before the dorsal fin.

== Classification/names ==
Secutor insidiator was first formally described in 1781 as Zeus insidiator by Marcus Elieser Bloch with the type locality given as Surat in India. Henry Weed Fowler named it as the type species of the genus Deveximentum. Some authorities regard the name Secutor to be a synonym of Leiognathus and that the genus should use Fowler's name. As of November 2023 it is accepted as Deveximentum insidiator (Bloch, 1787) on Fishbase.

== Distribution ==
Secutor insidiator is found in the Indo-Pacific from the Red Sea, Persian Gulf and East Africa in the Indian Ocean to Australia, New Caledonia and Tahiti in the western Pacific Ocean.

== Diet ==
This species is known to feed on phytoplankton, polychaeta (bristle worms), Noctiluca (sea sparkle), and Coscinodiscus.

== Predators ==
The barred ponyfish is known to be eaten by bluefish, Spanish mackerel, saurida, and several species of bonito. It is also used as bait by fishermen to capture larger fish which prey on the barred ponyfish. it has been observed to be consumed by predatory fish such as barramundi, several species of snapper and species of grouper; However, due to its small size, abundance and minimal defense mechanisms, it is prey for various fish. It is sold for human consumption in markets across Asia, commonly used in the "fried ponyfish" dish.

== Habitat ==
Secutor insidiator lives in shallow waters, close to the bottom and it can occasionally be found in brackish waters.

== Human consumption ==
Barred ponyfish are a delicacy in many parts of Asia such as Pakistan, China, most prevalently consumed throughout the Philippines, most commonly cooked whole, marinated in sauce and fried in oil. This recipe varies, as it is cooked with hot spices in Pakistan. This fish is sold in fish markets across Asia, due to its abundance and lack of resources needed to capture it.

== Methods of capture ==
This fish has been observed to be captured with cast nets by fishermen who are surf fishing, as barred ponyfish have been seen swimming in shoals off the coasts of Singapore. However, commercial fishing boats catch them for sale in large fish markets across Asia. Barred ponyfish are thought to migrate to estuaries with brackish water for purposes such as breeding and/ or feeding, and they can be caught using 'Tamban Rigs' as they are often called by local Singaporean fishermen, which consists of a long 1 metre main line with several small hooks attached to it, anchored by a lead sinker, commonly caught from a bridge or jetty.
