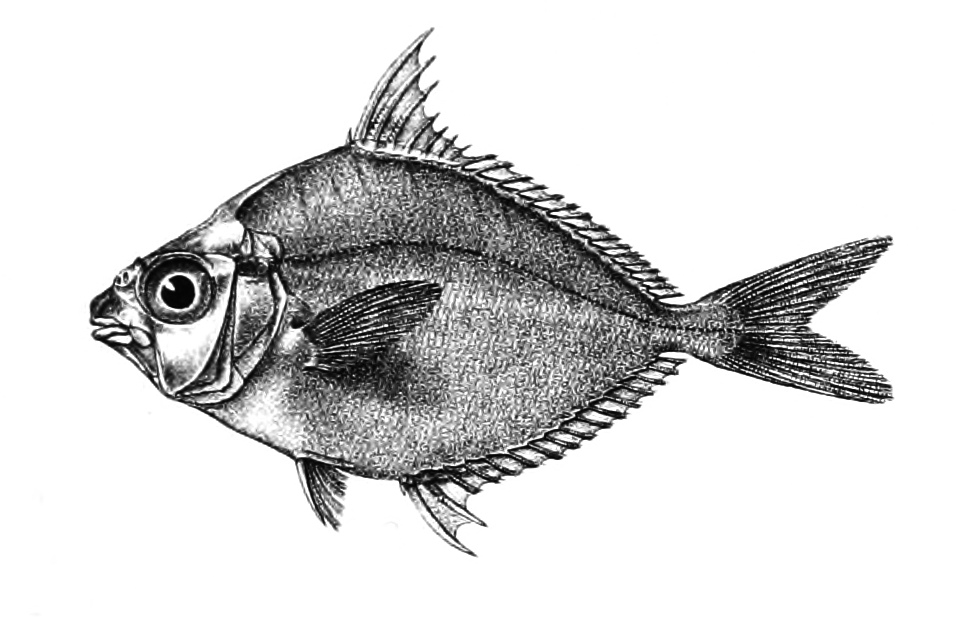

Scientific classification
- Kingdom: Animalia
- Phylum: Chordata
- Class: Actinopterygii
- Order: Acanthuriformes
- Family: Leiognathidae
- Genus: Karalla
- Species: K. dussumieri

Binomial name
- Karalla dussumieri (Valenciennes, 1835)

Synonyms
- Equula dussumieri Valenciennes, 1835; Leiognathus dussumieri (Valenciennes, 1835)

= Karalla dussumieri =

Species of ray-finned fish

Karalla dussumieri, Dussumier's ponyfish, is a species of marine ray-finned fish, a ponyfish from the family Leiognathidae. It is found in the Indo-Pacific region where it occurs from Madagascar and Réunion east to the Philippines. It is found in schools over substrates consisting of coral sand in coastal waters, although it will also enters estuaries. It feeds on small crustaceans, polychaetes, bivalves, foraminiferans, gastropods and nematodes. This species was first formally described as Equula dussumieri in 1835 by Achille Valenciennes with the type locality given as the Coromandel coast. The specific name honours the French voyager and merchant Jean-Jacques Dussumier (1792-1883), who collected the type.
