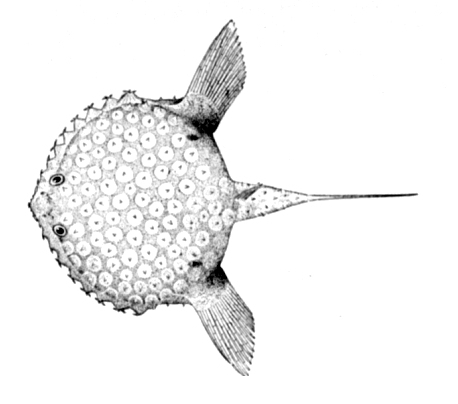
- Pancake batfish (H. aculeatus)

Scientific classification
- Domain: Eukaryota
- Kingdom: Animalia
- Phylum: Chordata
- Class: Actinopterygii
- Order: Lophiiformes
- Family: Ogcocephalidae
- Genus: Halieutichthys; Poey, 1863

Type species
- Halieutichthys reticulatus Poey, 1863

Synonyms
- Halieutella Goode & Bean, 1884

= Halieutichthys =

Genus of fishes

Halieutichthys is a genus of marine ray-finned fishes belonging to the family Ogcocephalidae, the deep-sea batfishes or sea bats. The fishes in this genus are found in the western Atlantic Ocean.

== Taxonomy ==
Haleutichthys was first proposed as a monospecific genus in 1863 by the Cuban zoologist Felipe Poey when he described Halieutichthys reticulatus, the type locality was given as off Cuba. H. reticulatus is now considered to be a junior synonym of Lophius aculeatus which had been described by Samuel Mitchill in 1818. Halieutichthys is divided into two clades, one being the H. aculeatus species complex with H. caribbaeus being the sister taxon to that clade. This genus is classified within the "Eastern Pacific/Western Atlantic clade" of the family Ogcocephalidae. The family Ogcocephalidae is classified in the monotypic suborder Ogcocephaloidei within the order Lophiiformes, the anglerfishes in the 5th edition of Fishes of the World.

== Etymology ==
Halieutichthys combines the genus name Halieutaea, for the similarity of these fishes to the species in that genus, and ichthys, the Greek word for "fish".

== Species ==
Halieutichthys currently contains four recognized species:

Image	Name	Common name	Distribution
	Halieutichthys aculeatus Mitchill, 1818	Pancake batfish	western Atlantic, North Carolina, northern Gulf of Mexico to northern South America
	Halieutichthys bispinosus H. C. Ho, Chakrabarty & Sparks, 2010	Spiny batfish	Gulf of Mexico
	Halieutichthys caribbaeus Garman, 1896	Caribbean batfish	Western central Atlantic: Caribbean Sea and the West Indies.
	Halieutichthys intermedius H.C. Ho, Chakrabarty & Sparks, 2010	Louisiana pancake batfish	Gulf of Mexico

== Characteristics ==
Halieutichthys batfishes have a flattened head and body which are widened into a rounded disc, with a moderately long tail. The mouth is very small, as is the illicial cavity on the snout which is covered by puffy, membranous folds. The esca is a single bulb. The pupils are covered. There is a buckler at the angle of the preoperculum which is not larger than the nearby bucklers. The openings of the gills are small and they are located to the rear of the upper base of the pectoral fins. The gill rakers are similar to small teeth set on short stalks. They have small dorsal and anal fins which are located to the rear of the body. The bases of the pectoral fins have a wide attachment to the body and the pelvic fins are not reduced in size. The lateral line is complete and there are a pair of lateral line organs on the caudal peduncle just in front of the anus. There are no tubercles along the lateral line. The scales are large, irregular and pitted, resembling small shields. The adults are scaleless on the underside of the body and large areas of the upperside are also without scales. These are relatively small anglerfishes with the largest being H. aculeatus with a maximum published total length of 10 cm (3.9 in).

== Distribution and habitat ==
Halieutichthys batfishes are found in the Western Atlantic Ocean. The aculeatus species group is found in the Gulf of Mexico and the southeastern coasts of the United States while H. cariibaeus is found in the Caribbean Sea and the West Indies. These fishes are found on sandy substrates at depths between 10 and 800 m (33 and 2,625 ft).
