= Photolateralis polyfenestrus =

Scientific classification
- Kingdom: Animalia
- Phylum: Chordata
- Class: Actinopterygii
- Order: Acanthuriformes
- Family: Leiognathidae
- Genus: Photolateralis
- Species: P. polyfenestrus

Binomial name
- Photolateralis polyfenestrus Sparks and Chakrabarty, 2019

Species of fish

Photolateralis polyfenestrus is a species of ray-finned fish in the family Leiognathidae. It is native to the Gulf of Oman. It was described to science as a new species in 2019.

== Description ==
Photolateralis polyfenestrus is a small fish, growing to around 6.7 cm (2.63 in) in length. The ground coloration is an olive color above the midline, while it is silver below it. They are mottled with dark brown blotches above the midline. Along their midlateral stripe, they possess groupings of chromatophores, where the region appears darker due to high concentration of nearby melanophores. All males of the species possess a bioluminescent organ near the gas bladder.

== Etymology ==
The specific name, polyfenestrus, references the translucent midlateral windows.
