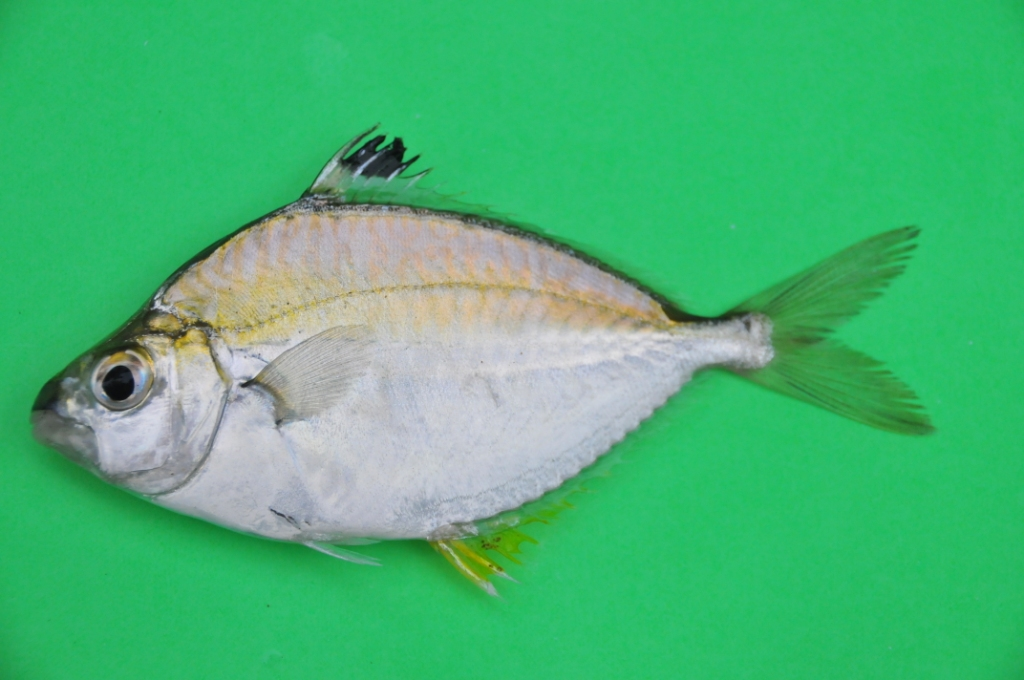
- Karalla daura

Scientific classification
- Kingdom: Animalia
- Phylum: Chordata
- Class: Actinopterygii
- Order: Acanthuriformes
- Family: Leiognathidae
- Subfamily: Gazzinae
- Genus: Karalla; Chakrabarty & Sparks, 2008

Type species
- Equula daura G. Cuvier, 1829

= Karalla =

Genus of ray-finned fishes

Karalla is a genus of marine ray-finned fishes, ponyfishes from the family Leiognathidae which are native to the Indian Ocean and the western Pacific Ocean.

== Species ==
There are currently two recognized species in this genus:

- Karalla daura (G. Cuvier, 1829) (Goldstripe ponyfish)
- Karalla dussumieri (Valenciennes, 1835) (Dussumier's ponyfish)
