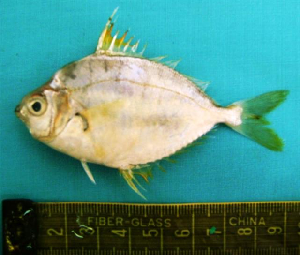

Conservation status
- Least Concern (IUCN 3.1)

Scientific classification
- Kingdom: Animalia
- Phylum: Chordata
- Class: Actinopterygii
- Order: Acanthuriformes
- Family: Leiognathidae
- Genus: Photopectoralis
- Species: P. bindus

Binomial name
- Photopectoralis bindus (Valenciennes, 1835)

Synonyms
- Equula brevirostris Valenciennes in Cuvier & Valenciennes, 1835; Equula bindus Valenciennes (ex Russell) in Cuvier & Valenciennes, 1835; Leiognathus brevirostris (Valenciennes, 1835); Leiognathus virgatus Fowler, 1904

= Photopectoralis bindus =

Species of ray-finned fish

Photopectoralis bindus, commonly known as the shortnose ponyfish or orangefin ponyfish, is a ray-finned fish of brackish and marine waters found from Indo-West Pacific to the Indian coasts and off Sri Lanka to China and south of Australia. Like its relatives, the fish is an amphidromous, demersal species which feeds on diatoms, copepods, Lucifer, nematodes and polychaetes. The fish has eight dorsal spines, sixteen dorsal soft rays, three anal spines and fourteen anal soft rays. Fresh specimens possess a golden gleam which fades with dryness.
