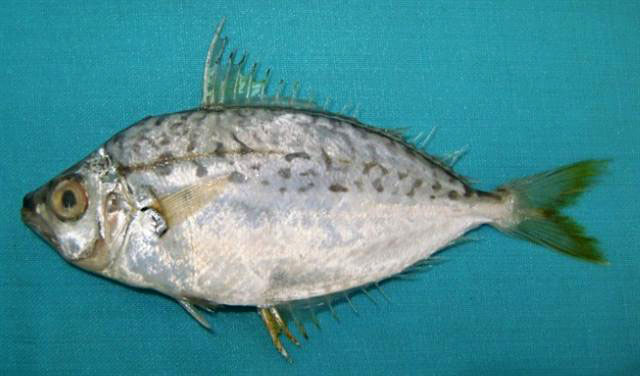

Conservation status
- Least Concern (IUCN 3.1)

Scientific classification
- Kingdom: Animalia
- Phylum: Chordata
- Class: Actinopterygii
- Order: Acanthuriformes
- Family: Leiognathidae
- Genus: Equulites
- Species: E. berbis

Binomial name
- Equulites berbis (Valenciennes, 1835)

Synonyms
- Scomber equula minimus Forsskål, 1775; Equula berbis Valenciennes, 1835; Leiognathus berbis (Valenciennes, 1835); Equula klunzingeri Steindachner, 1898; Leiognathus vermiculatus Fowler, 1904; Leiognathus mediterraneus Rhasis Erazi, 1943

= Equulites berbis =

Species of ray-finned fish

Equulites berbis, the Berber ponyfish, is a species of marine ray-finned fish, a ponyfish from the family Leiognathidae. It is found in brackish and marine waters in the Indian and Pacific Oceans from the Red Sea, Gulf of Aden and Zanzibar east in the Indian Ocean to south-east Asia. Like its relatives, the fish is a demersal species that feeds on small crustaceans and bivalves. Equula berbis is considered by some authorities to be nomen dubium with the taxon it is assigned to being of uncertain placement beyond the family level, the name being thought to probably be a junior synonym of Equulites oblongus.
