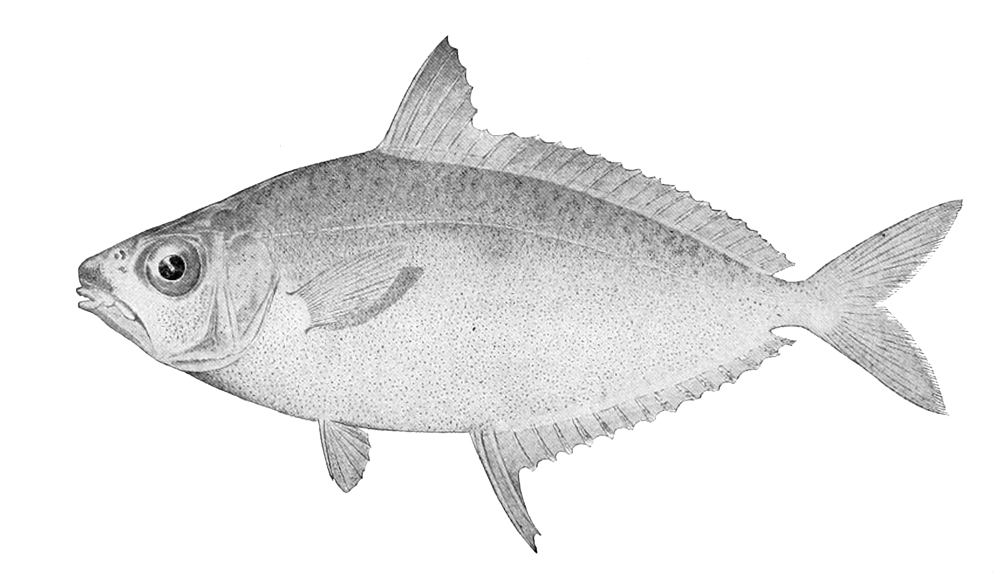
- Equulites leuciscus

Scientific classification
- Kingdom: Animalia
- Phylum: Chordata
- Class: Actinopterygii
- Order: Acanthuriformes
- Family: Leiognathidae
- Genus: Equulites; Fowler, 1904

Type species
- Leiognathus vermiculatus Fowler, 1904

Synonyms
- Photoplagios Sparks, Dunlap & Smith, 2005

= Equulites =

Genus of ray-finned fishes

Equulites is a genus of ponyfishes native to the Indian Ocean and the western Pacific Ocean. Analysis of mitochondrial DNA published in 2017 has suggested that Equulites elongatus is in fact a species group made up of three species Equulites aethopos, Equulites elongatus and Equulites popei.

== Species ==
There are currently 10 recognized species in this genus:

- Equulites aethopos Suzuki & Kimura, 2017 (Red Sea elongated ponyfish)
- Equulites berbis (Valenciennes, 1835) (Berber ponyfish)
- Equulites elongatus (Günther, 1874) (Slender ponyfish)
- Equulites laterofenestra (Sparks & Chakrabarty, 2007)
- Equulites leuciscus (Günther, 1860) (Whipfin ponyfish)
- Equulites macrolepis Suzuki, Osmany & Kimura, 2023 (Largescale ponyfish)
- Equulites oblongus (Valenciennes, 1835) (Oblong ponyfish)
- Equulites popei (Whitley, 1932) (Pope's ponyfish)
- Equulites rivulatus (Temminck & Schlegel, 1845)
- Equulites ryukyuensis Kimura & Suzuki, 2023 (Okinawan whip-fin ponyfish)

Synonyms

- Equulites absconditus Chakrabarty & Sparks, 2010; valid as E. berbis
- Equulites klunzingeri (Steindachner, 1898); valid as E. berbis
- Equulites vermiculatus Fowler, 1904; valid as E. berbis
