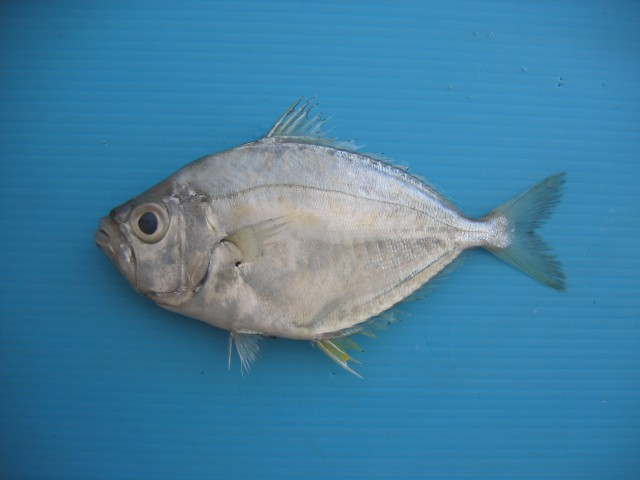

Conservation status
- Least Concern (IUCN 3.1)

Scientific classification
- Kingdom: Animalia
- Phylum: Chordata
- Class: Actinopterygii
- Order: Acanthuriformes
- Family: Leiognathidae
- Genus: Gazza
- Species: G. minuta

Binomial name
- Gazza minuta (Bloch, 1795)

Synonyms
- Scomber minutus Bloch, 1795; Equula minuta (Bloch, 1795); Zeus argentarius Forster, 1801; Gazza argentaria (Forster, 1801); Gazza equulaeformis Rüppell, 1835; Equula dispar De Vis, 1884; Gazza dispar (De Vis, 1884)

= Gazza minuta =

Species of ray-finned fish

Gazza minuta, the toothpony or toothed ponyfish, is a species of marine ray-finned fish, a ponyfish from the family Leiognathidae. It is found in the Indo-Pacific from the Red Sea and the east African coast east through the Indian and Pacific Oceans to Australia and Tahiti north as far as the Ryukyu Islands. It occurs over sandy and silty bottoms, although the young prefer mangroves and silty reefs. it feeds using its protruding pipette-like mouth or using the gill rakers as seives. Its food consists of smaller fishes, crustaceans and polychaetes.
