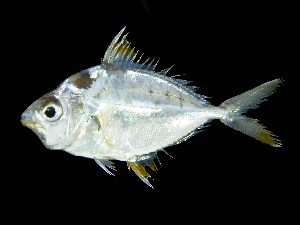

Scientific classification
- Kingdom: Animalia
- Phylum: Chordata
- Class: Actinopterygii
- Order: Acanthuriformes
- Family: Leiognathidae
- Genus: Nuchequula
- Species: N. gerreoides

Binomial name
- Nuchequula gerreoides (Bleeker, 1851)

Synonyms
- Equula gerreoides Bleeker, 1851; Equula decora De Vis, 1884; Leiognathus decorus (De Vis, 1884); Nuchequula decora (De Vis, 1884)

= Nuchequula gerreoides =

Species of ray-finned fish

Nuchequula gerreoides, commonly known as the longspine ponyfish, is a species of marine ray-finned fish, a ponyfish from the family Leiognathidae. It is a fish of brackish and sea waters which is found in the Indian and western Pacific Oceans.

== Description ==
Nuchequula gerreoides are typically silver with long spines running along their back and stomach. Some fish may also be brown or gray with either yellow or blue spots on their bodies. The max length a Nuchequula gerreoide can grow is 12.5 centimeters.

== Environment ==
Nuchequula gerreoides live in coastal waters in a depth of 10 to 30 meters. They are commonly found in estuaries, which is where the tide of the river meets the sea. Nuchequula gerreoides are demersal fish, which means that they normally live close to the floor in seas or lakes. They periodically migrate from salt water to fresh water, this is a process called amphidromous. Generally, fish that do this migrate for breeding purposes, but the cause of their migration is unknown.

== Diet ==
The diet of Nuchequula gerreoides depends on their size. If the fish are smaller, approximately less than 6.9 centimeters, their diet would consist of small crustaceans. If the fish are bigger, approximately greater than 7.0 centimeters, their diet would consist of amphipods, polychaetes, and detritus.

== Reproduction ==
Fertilization for these fish takes place outside the body. The eggs are either released in open water or scattered beneath the surface of the sea floor. They do not guard their eggs and do not take care of the fish after they are born.
