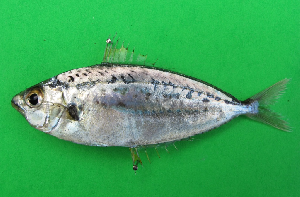
- Indonesia

Scientific classification
- Kingdom: Animalia
- Phylum: Chordata
- Class: Actinopterygii
- Order: Acanthuriformes
- Family: Leiognathidae
- Genus: Equulites
- Species: E. popei

Binomial name
- Equulites popei (Whitley), 1932

Synonyms
- Macilentichthys popei Whitley, 1932; Leiognathus elongatus Smith & Pope, 1906

= Equulites popei =

Species of fish

Equulites popei, Pope's ponyfish, is a species of marine ray-finned fish, a ponyfish from the family Leiognathidae. It has a wide Indo-Pacific distribution which extends from the Red Sea east to the western Pacific Ocean. It has entered the Mediterranean as a Lessepsian migrant. It was formerly considered to be synonymous with the elongate ponyfish (Equulites elongatus).

== Description ==
Equulites popei differs from the other members of the E. elongatus species complex by having an eye diameter which is 82–137% of the length of the head to the rear of the eye. In addition, the distance from pelvic fin insertion to the centre of anus is a third to a half of that from the pelvic fin insertion to origin of the anal fin. The upper flanks have large dark blotches which occasionally create up to 2 ring markings and there are sometimes up to 5 dark spots which are less than 50% of the diameter of the pupil. The head and lower flanks and belly are nearly a uniformly silvery white. The tip of the snout is blackish. The upper rear edge of the gill cover is light yellow. The upper flanks and back are silvery brown interspersed with dark blotches. The pectoral fin is pale yellow, there are black lines along the rays of the caudal fin which has a dark margin and all of the other fins are colourless. The maximum recorded total length is 12 centimetres (4.7 in).

== Distribution ==
Equulites popei has an Indo-Pacific distribution. Its range extends from the Red Sea and the coast of East Africa east to the Philippines and north to Japan. It was recorded as E. elongatus for the first time in the Mediterranean Sea off Israel in 2011, and more recently off Lebanon and Turkey where it remains rare.

== Habitat and biology ==
Equulites popei is found in shallow waters, where it is normally encountered in schools close to the bottom. It feeds mostly on small crustaceans, polychaetes and algae.

== Taxonomy ==
Equulites popei was first formally described in 1932 as Macilentichthys popei by the Australian ichthyologist Gilbert Percy Whitley (1903–1975) with the type locality given as Kagoshima, Japan. Whitley did not specify the identity of the person honoured in its specific name but since he was replacing the preoccupied name elongatus given to this species by the American ichthyologists Hugh McCormick Smith (1865–1941) and Thomas E.B. Pope then it is likely that Pope was being honoured. Until recently E. popei was considered synonymous with E. elongatus but E. elongatus is now considered a species complex with E. popei and the Red Sea elongate ponyfish (Equulites aethopos).
