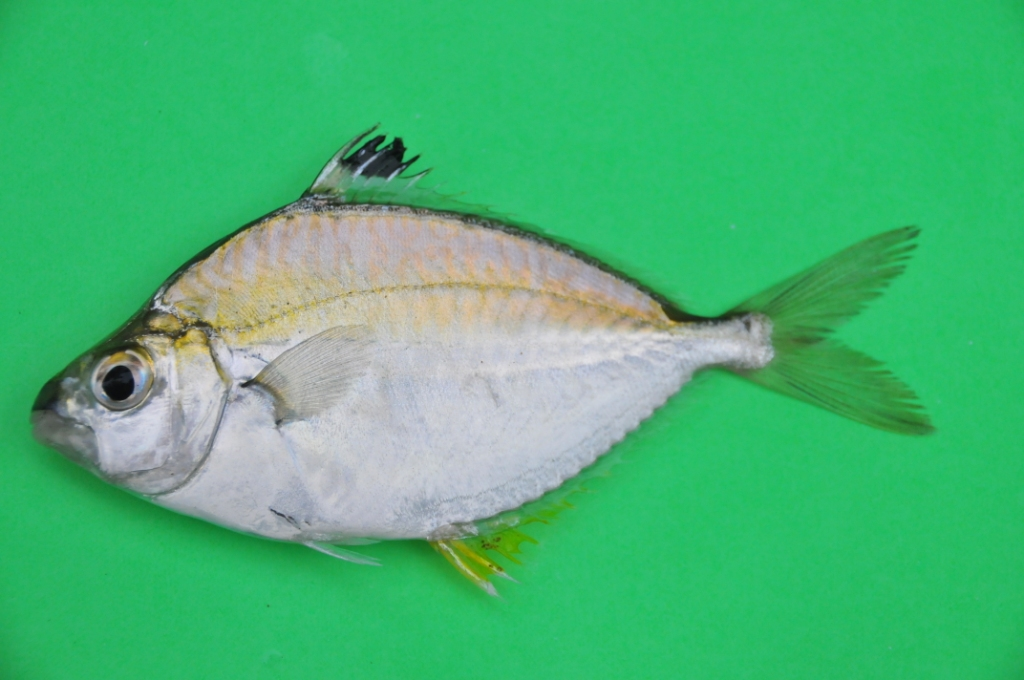

Scientific classification
- Kingdom: Animalia
- Phylum: Chordata
- Class: Actinopterygii
- Order: Acanthuriformes
- Family: Leiognathidae
- Genus: Karalla
- Species: K. daura

Binomial name
- Karalla daura (Cuvier, 1829)

Synonyms
- Equula daura Cuvier, 1829; Leiognathus daura (Cuvier, 1829); Equula dacer Valenciennes, 1835

= Karalla daura =

Species of ray-finned fish

Karalla daura, the goldstripe ponyfish, black slipmouth, black-finned slipmouth or pugnose pony, is a species of marine ray-finned fish, a ponyfish from the family Leiognathidae. It is native to the Indian Ocean and the western Pacific Ocean, from the Gulf of Aden to the Philippines. It is found in shallow water, mainly over muddy substrates where it normally occurs in schools. Its diet consists of polychaetes, bivalves, small crustaceans and sponges.
