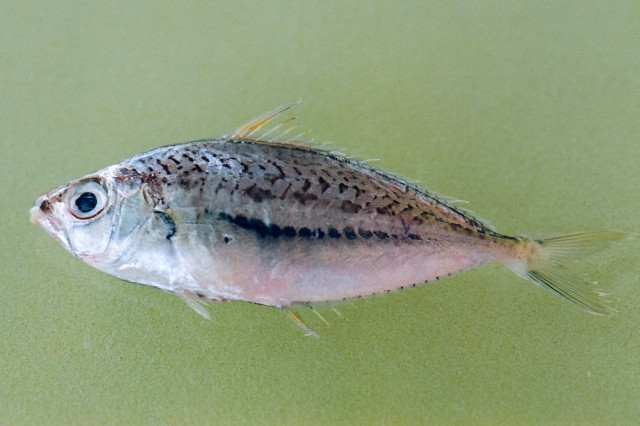

Scientific classification
- Kingdom: Animalia
- Phylum: Chordata
- Class: Actinopterygii
- Order: Acanthuriformes
- Family: Leiognathidae
- Genus: Equulites
- Species: E. elongatus

Binomial name
- Equulites elongatus (Günther, 1874)

Synonyms
- Equula elongata Günther, 1874; Leiognathus elongatus (Günther, 1874)

= Equulites elongatus =

Species of fish

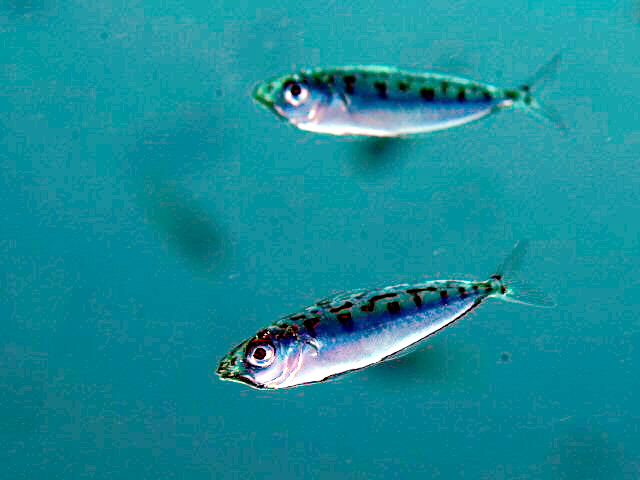

Equulites elongatus, the slender ponyfish, also called the elongate ponyfish, elongate slimy or elongated slipmouth, is a marine fish of the family Leiognathidae native to the western Pacific and Indian Oceans.

== Description ==
Equulites elongatus has an elongated body compared to its congeners but has the downward pointing, protractile mouth typical of the family Leiognathidae situated underneath the pointed snout. The single dorsal fin has 8 spines and 16 soft rays. the first spine is small, the subsequent three spines are larger and they then decrease sharply in size towards the caudal fin while the dorsal rays are nearly equal in length. The anal fin has 3 spines and 14 soft rays, with the first spine being rather small and forked. The pectoral fin has 16 soft rays while the small pelvic fin a single spine and five soft rays with its origin is slightly in front of the origin of the pectoral fin. The head lacks any scales, while the cheek and breast are covered in small scales and there are spines on the nape. The upper body is dark grey in colour with irregular dark spots and the underside is silver-grey. The iris is silver-grey and the pupil is black. They grow up to 12 centimetres (4 1/2 in) in length but the normal length is 8 centimetres (3 in). E. elongatus is bioluminescent similar to Leiognathids as a whole. Light is produced by its symbiosis with Photobacterium leiognathi living in its light organ. Sasaki et al 2003 report observations in its natural habitat. They find E. elongatus modulating light output for intraspecific signaling.

== Distribution ==
Equulites elongates is found in the Indo-West Pacific and has been recorded from northern Australia, Indonesia and Myanmar.

== Biology ==
Equulites elongates is a demersal species which is found in shallow waters to depths of 30 metres (98 ft) and is a gregarious species which is normally encountered inschools near the sea bed. It feeds mainly on benthic invertebrates such as small crustaceans and polychaete worms as well as algae.

== Fisheries ==
Equulites elongates is of minor commercial importance.

== Taxonomy ==
Analysis of mitochondrial DNA published in 2017 has suggested that Equulites elongates is in fact a species group made up of three species Equulites aethopos from the southern Red Sea; Equulites elongatus from the south-east Asia and northern Australia; and Equulites popei from the Red Sea and eastern Africa east to the Andaman Sea. This split has been accepted by Fishbase.
