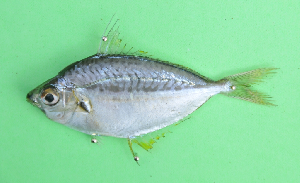

Scientific classification
- Kingdom: Animalia
- Phylum: Chordata
- Class: Actinopterygii
- Order: Acanthuriformes
- Family: Leiognathidae
- Genus: Photolateralis
- Species: P. stercorarius

Binomial name
- Photolateralis stercorarius (Everman & Seale, 1907)

Synonyms
- Leiognathus stercorarius Evermann & Seale, 1907; Equulites stercorarius (Evermann & Seale, 1907); Photoplagios stercorarius (Evermann & Seale, 1907)

= Photolateralis stercorarius =

Species of ray-finned fish

Photolateralis stercorarius, the oblong slipmouth, is a marine ray-finned fish, a ponyfish from the family Leiognathidae. It has been recorded from Indonesia, Philippines, New Guinea, Guam and Tonga in the western Pacific Ocean. It lives on inner reef flats and in silt-laden inshore waters at depths greater than 20 metres (66 ft). It attains a maximum recorded total length of 10.2 centimetres (4.0 in). It was first formally described in 1907 as known as Leiognathus stercorarius by the American ichthyologists Barton Warren Evermann (1853-1932) and Alvin Seale (1871-1958) with the type locality given as Bulan, Sorsogon in the Philippines. It was more recently named as Equulites stercorarius, but was re-evaluated in 2015 as part of Photolateralis. It is the type species of the genus Photolateralis.
