= Deveximentum hanedai =

Conservation status
- Least Concern (IUCN 3.1)

Scientific classification
- Kingdom: Animalia
- Phylum: Chordata
- Class: Actinopterygii
- Division: Teleostei
- Order: Acanthuriformes
- Family: Leiognathidae
- Genus: Deveximentum
- Species: D. hanedai

Binomial name
- Deveximentum hanedai (Mochizuki & Hayashi, 1989)

Synonyms
- Secutor hanedai Mochizuki & Hayashi 1989

Species of ray-finned fish

Deveximentum hanedai is a species of marine ray-finned fish, a ponyfish from the family Leiognathidae. It isnative to the Indian and Pacific ocean waters around the countries of Thailand, Indonesia and Malaysia. It can be found in marine and brackish waters.

== Size ==
This species can reach a length of 7.1 centimetres (2.8 in) SL.

== Etymology ==
The specific name honours Yata Haneda (1907–1995), a Japanese biologist who studied bioluminescent organisms, including ponyfishes.
