= Photopectoralis aureus =

Conservation status
- Least Concern (IUCN 3.1)

Scientific classification
- Kingdom: Animalia
- Phylum: Chordata
- Class: Actinopterygii
- Division: Teleostei
- Order: Acanthuriformes
- Family: Leiognathidae
- Genus: Photopectoralis
- Species: P. aureus

Binomial name
- Photopectoralis aureus (T. Abe & Haneda, 1972)

Synonyms
- Leiognathus aureus Abe & Haneda

Species of ray-finned fish

Photopectoralis aureus, commonly known as the golden ponyfish or false toothed ponyfish, is a marine ray-finned fish native to the Western Pacific from Taiwan south to Indonesia as well as to the Gulf of Thailand, Timor Sea, and the Arafura Sea. It grows to 10 cm (3.9 in) TL. This species was first formally described in 1972 as Leiognathus aureus by the Japanese ichthyologists Tokiharu Abe (1911–1996) and Yata Haneda (1907–1995) with the type locality given as Ambon fish market on Ambon Island. It is the type species of the genus Photopectoralis which was delineated by John Stephen Sparks, Paul V. Dunlap and William Leo Smith in 2005.
