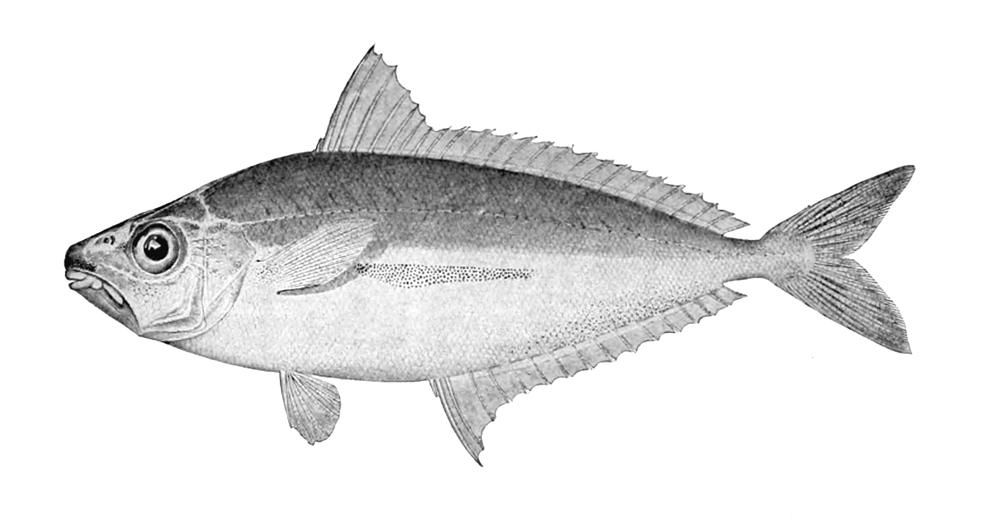
- illustration of Photolateralis stercorarius

Scientific classification
- Kingdom: Animalia
- Phylum: Chordata
- Class: Actinopterygii
- Order: Acanthuriformes
- Family: Leiognathidae
- Subfamily: Gazzinae
- Genus: Photolateralis; Sparks & Chakrabarty, 2015

Type species
- Leiognathus stercorarius Evermann & Seale, 1907

= Photolateralis =

Genus of ray-finned fishes

Photolateralis is a genus of marine ray-finned fishes, ponyfish from the family Leiognathidae. This genus is unique among ponyfishes in possessing a translucent mid-lateral flank stripe which, depending on the species, may be either a composite stripe of numerous independent translucent windows or a continuous translucent lateral stripe.

== Species ==
There are 4 recognized species in this genus:

- Photolateralis antongil (Sparks, 2006)
- Photolateralis moretoniensis (J. D. Ogilby, 1912) (Moreton Bay ponyfish)
- Photolateralis stercorarius (Evermann & Seale, 1907) (Oblong slipmouth)
- Photolateralis polyfenestrus (Sparks & Chakrabarty, 2019)
