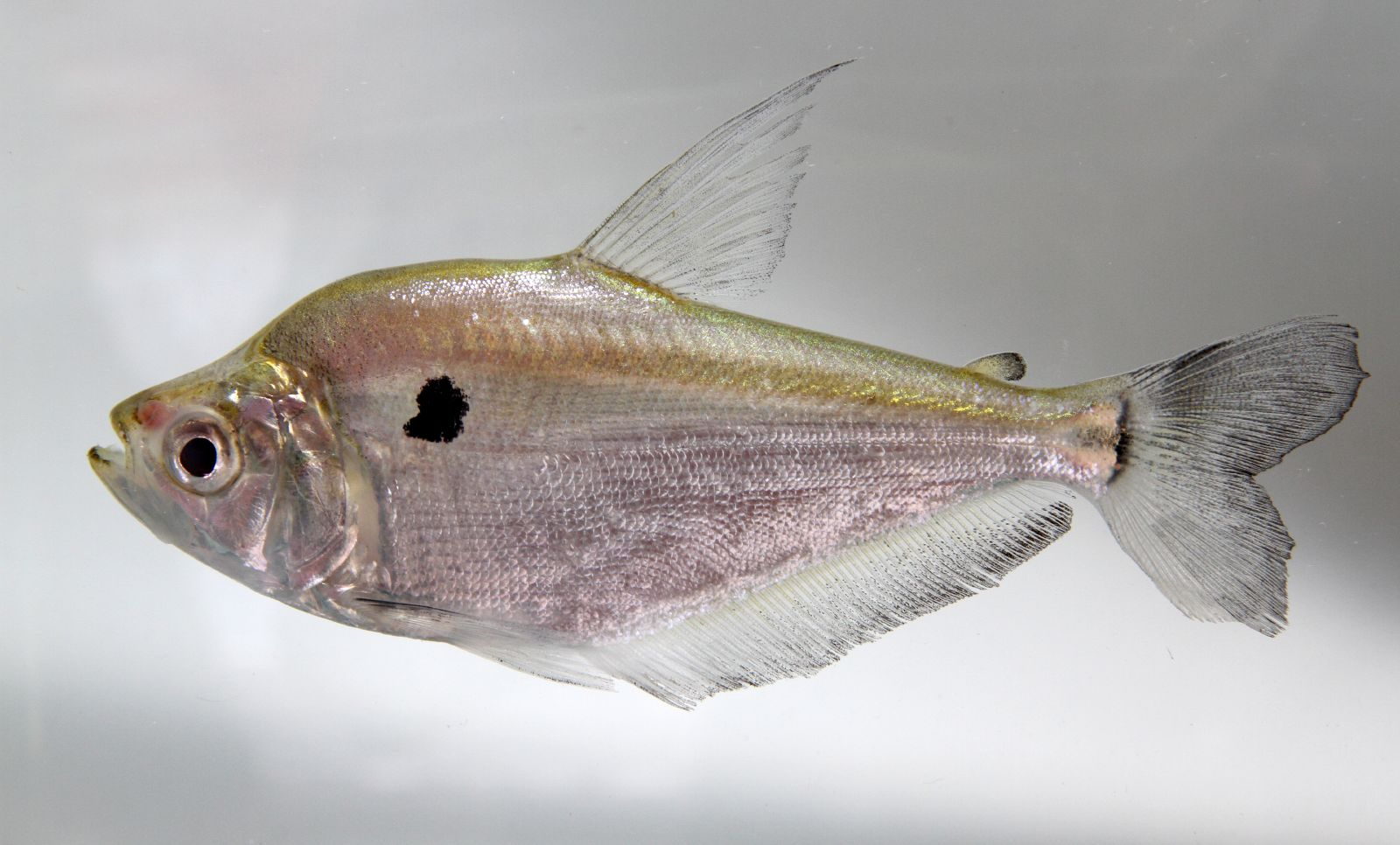
- Roeboides margareteae

Scientific classification
- Kingdom: Animalia
- Phylum: Chordata
- Class: Actinopterygii
- Order: Characiformes
- Family: Characidae
- Subfamily: Characinae
- Genus: Roeboides; Günther, 1864

Type species
- Epicyrtus microlepis J. T. Reinhardt, 1851

Synonyms
- Evermannella C. H. Eigenmann, 1903; Eucynopotamus Fowler, 1904; Cynocharax Fowler, 1907; Evermannolus C. H. Eigenmann, 1907

= Roeboides =

Genus of fishes

Roeboides is a genus of freshwater ray-finned fishes, characins, belonging to the family Characidae. The fishes in this genus are found in Central and South America. These fish are small, are typically translucent, and have a rhomboid shape.

== Species ==
Roeboides contains the following valid species:

- Roeboides affinis (Günther, 1868)
- Roeboides araguaito C. A. S. de Lucena, 2003
- Roeboides biserialis (Garman, 1890)
- Roeboides bouchellei Fowler, 1923 (Crystal tetra)
- Roeboides bussingi Matamoros, Chakrabarty, Angulo, Garita-Alvarado & McMahan, 2013
- Roeboides carti C. A. S. de Lucena, 2000
- Roeboides dayi (Steindachner, 1878)
- Roeboides descalvadensis Fowler, 1932 (Parana scale-eating characin)
- Roeboides dientonito L. P. Schultz, 1944
- Roeboides dispar C. A. S. de Lucena, 2001
- Roeboides guatemalensis (Günther, 1864) (Guatemalan headstander)
- Roeboides ilseae W. A. Bussing, 1986
- Roeboides loftini C. A. S. de Lucena, 2011
- Roeboides margareteae C. A. S. de Lucena, 2003
- Roeboides microlepis (J. T. Reinhardt, 1851)
- Roeboides myersii T. N. Gill, 1870
- Roeboides numerosus C. A. S. de Lucena, 2000
- Roeboides occidentalis Meek & Hildebrand, 1916
- Roeboides oligistos C. A. S. de Lucena, 2000
- Roeboides sazimai C. A. S. de Lucena, 2007
- Roeboides xenodon (J. T. Reinhardt, 1851)
