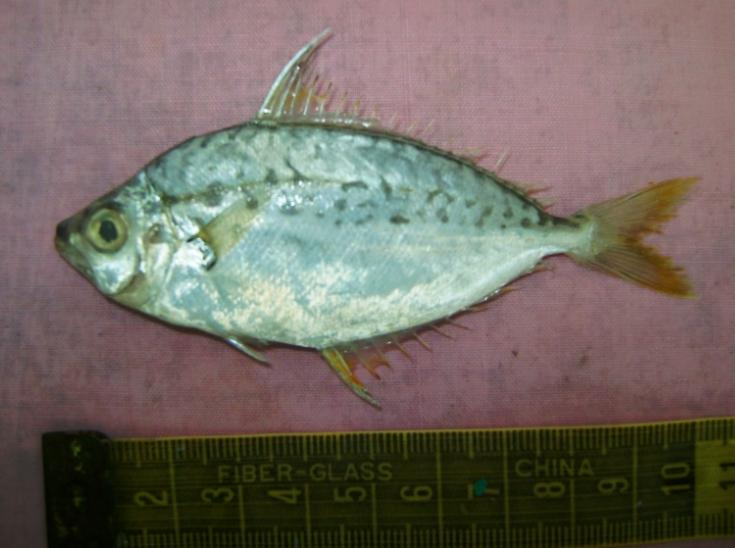

Scientific classification
- Kingdom: Animalia
- Phylum: Chordata
- Class: Actinopterygii
- Order: Acanthuriformes
- Family: Leiognathidae
- Genus: Equulites
- Species: E. klunzingeri

Binomial name
- Equulites klunzingeri (Steindachner, 1898)

Synonyms
- Equula klunzingeri Steindachner, 1898; Leiognathus klunzingeri (Steindachner, 1898); Leiognathus mediterraneus Rhasis Erazi, 1943; Photoplagios klunzingeri (Steindachner, 1898)

= Equulites klunzingeri =

Species of fish

Equulites klunzingeri, or Klunzinger's ponyfish, is a marine, demersal species of ponyfish from the family Leiognathidae which was originally found only in the Red Sea. It is colonizing the Mediterranean as part of the Lessepsian migration through the Suez Canal.

== Description ==
Equulites klunzingeri has a laterally compressed, oblong body, large eyes and a downward pointing, protractile mouth, which can project to the same length as the head and with jaws line with villiform teeth. It has a long dorsal fin, starting above the pelvic fins, which has seven spines, the second of which is very long, and 15-16 soft rays. The anal fin has three spines and 15-16 soft rays. The dorsal and anal fin rays are sheathed in a scaly membrane. The tail is forked and the lateral lines continues on to the caudal peduncle. The skin is covered in small cycloid scales. The upper part of the body is mottled grey marked with pink blotches while the belly is silvery white and there is a black line along either side of the base of the dorsal fin. There is another black line immediately anterior to the eye and the iris is golden. It grows to 11 cm (4.3 in) standard length.

== Distribution ==
Equulites klunzingeri is native to the Red Sea and it has been recorded in the Sea of Oman but not yet off the southern coast of the Arabian Peninsula. First recorded in the Mediterranean Sea off Syria in 1931 it has since invaded the eastern basin of the Mediterranean Sea by migrating through the Suez Canal and now reaches up to the coast of Croatia

== Biology ==
Equulites klunzingeri is a demersal species, inhabiting inshore waters over sandy or muddy substrates and occurs down to a depth of 70m where it feeds on benthic invertebrates which are caught with the protruding mouth. It is euryhaline and can enter estuarine environments. It spawns in the summer months, the eggs and larvae are planktonic. The females attain sexual maturity at 5.5 cm and the males at 5.8 cm, this equates to an age of about 2–3 years, the normal lifespan is 6 years. It is gregarious and forms schools, which can be large or small. E. klunzeringii, like other members of the family Leiognathidae, uses a bioluminescent organ situated around its oesophagus to camouflage the fish from below by counter-illumination, the bioluminescence is produced by symbiotic bacteria Photobacterium leiognathi.

== Fisheries ==
Equulites klunzingeri is not a quarry species for fisheries but it is taken as a bycatch in fisheries using trawls and seines.

== Taxonomy ==
Equulites klunzingeri was first formally described as Equula klunzingeri in 1898 by the Austrian ichthyologist Franz Steindachner with the type locality given as the Gulf of Suez in Egypt. Steindachner did not specify the identity of the person honoured in its specific name but it is clearly the German physician and zoologist Carl Benjamin Klunzinger (1834-1914).
