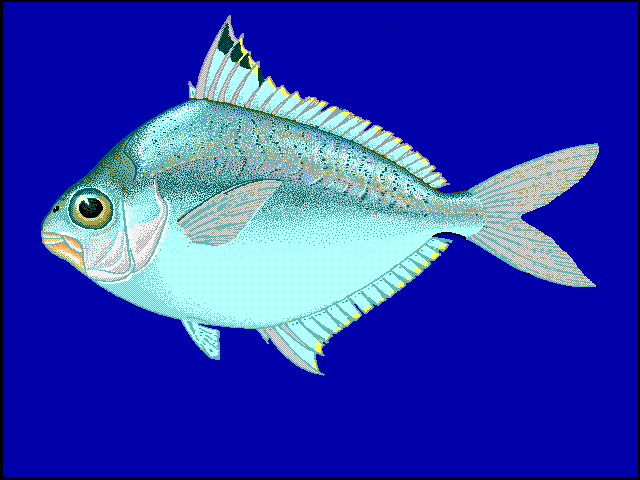
- Splendid Ponyfish (E. splendens)

Scientific classification
- Kingdom: Animalia
- Phylum: Chordata
- Class: Actinopterygii
- Order: Acanthuriformes
- Family: Leiognathidae
- Subfamily: Gazzinae
- Genus: Eubleekeria; Fowler, 1904

Type species
- Equula splendens Cuvier, 1829

= Eubleekeria =

Genus of ray-finned fishes

Eubleekeria is a genus of marine ray-finned fishes, ponyfishes from the family Leiognathidae which are native to the Indian Ocean and the western Pacific Ocean.

== Species ==
There are currently four recognized species in this genus:

- Eubleekeria jonesi (P. S. B. R. James, 1971) (Jones’s ponyfish)
- Eubleekeria kupanensis (Seishi Kimura & Peristiwady, 2005) (Kupang ponyfish)
- Eubleekeria rapsoni (Munro, 1964) (Rapson's ponyfish)
- Eubleekeria splendens (Cuvier, 1829) (Splendid ponyfish)

== Etymology ==
The name of the genus Eubleekeria consists of the prefix eu which means “good” and the suffix ia meaning “of” or “belonging to“ the Dutch physician and ichthyologist Pieter Bleeker (1819-1878).
