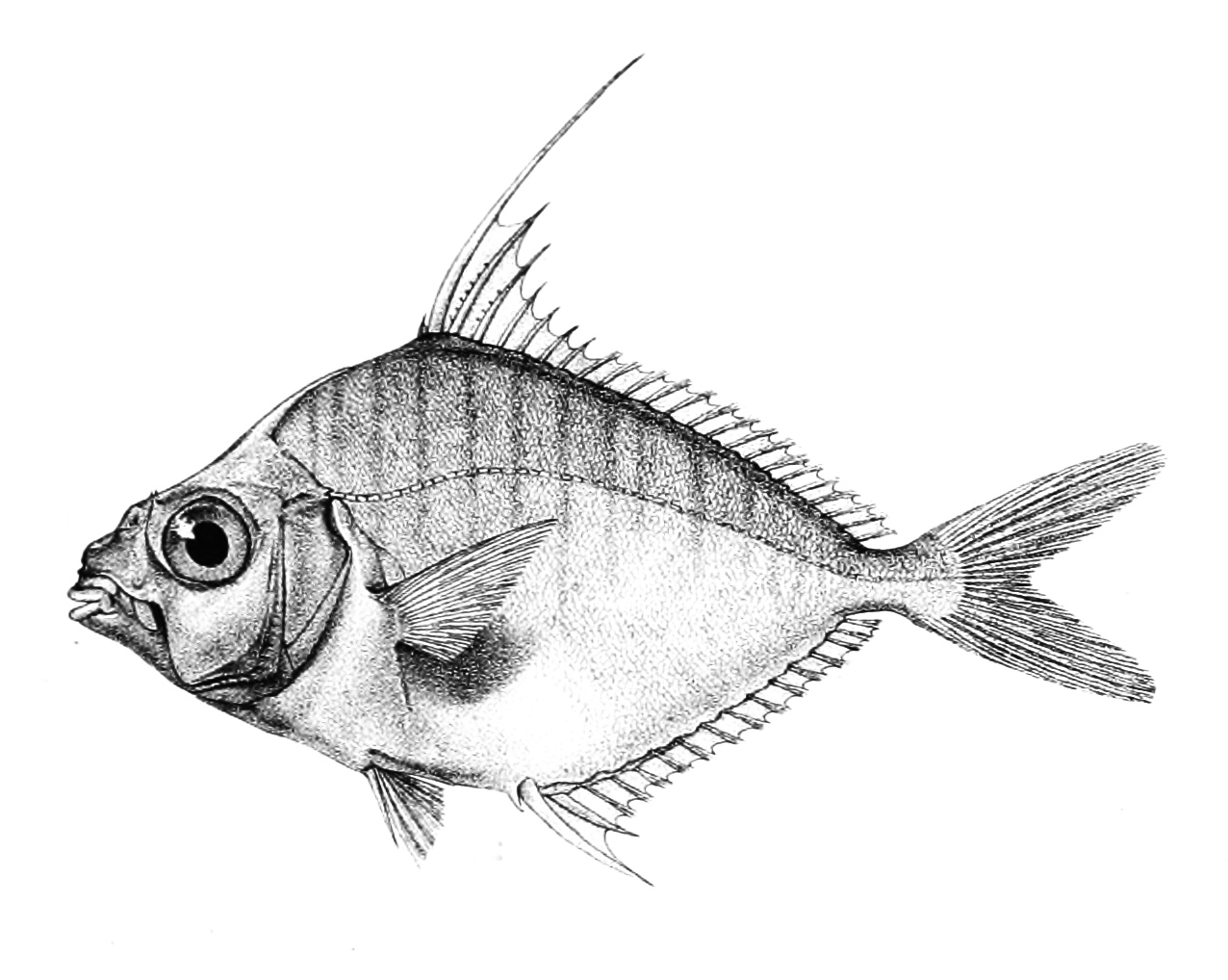

Conservation status
- Least Concern (IUCN 3.1)

Scientific classification
- Kingdom: Animalia
- Phylum: Chordata
- Class: Actinopterygii
- Division: Teleostei
- Order: Acanthuriformes
- Family: Leiognathidae
- Genus: Aurigequula; Fowler, 1918
- Species: A. fasciata

Binomial name
- Aurigequula fasciata (Lacépède, 1803)

Synonyms
- Clupea fasciata Lacepède, 1803; Equula fasciata (Lacepède, 1803); Leiognathus fasciatus (Lacepède, 1803); Equula cara Cuvier, 1829; Equula filigera Valenciennes, 1835; Equula serrulifera Richardson, 1848; Equula asina De Vis, 1884

= Striped ponyfish =

Species of ray-finned fish

The striped ponyfish (Aurigequula fasciata) is a species of marine ray-finned fish, a ponyfish from the family Leiognathidae. It is native to the Indian Ocean and the western Pacific Ocean, from the Red Sea and the eastern coast of Africa to Fiji and Samoa, where it occurs in coastal marine and brackish waters. It occurs at depths of from 20 to 50 metres (66 to 164 ft). It is a predator upon smaller fishes, small crustaceans and polychaete worms. This species grows to a length of 21 centimetres (8.3 in) TL though most do not exceed 17 centimetres (6.7 in) TL. It is of minor importance to local commercial fisheries. This species is the only known member of its genus.
