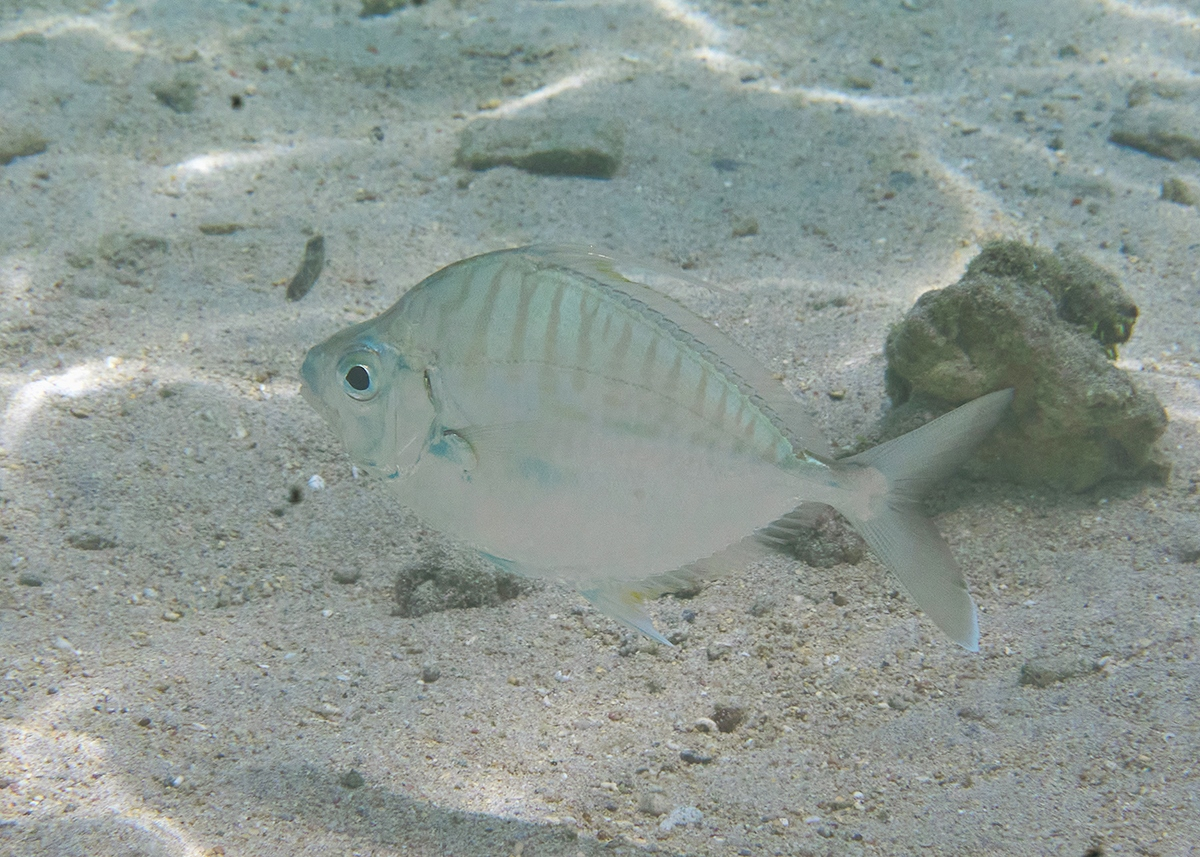
- Aurigequula fasciata

Scientific classification
- Kingdom: Animalia
- Phylum: Chordata
- Class: Actinopterygii
- Division: Teleostei
- Order: Acanthuriformes
- Family: Leiognathidae
- Subfamily: Leiognathinae
- Genus: Aurigequula; Fowler, 1918

Type species
- Clupea fasciata Lacépède, 1803

= Aurigequula =

Genus of ray-finned fishes

Aurigequula is a genus of marine ray-finned fishes, ponyfishes from the family Leiognathidae. They are native to the Indian Ocean and the western Pacific Ocean.

== Species ==
There are currently 3 recognized species in this genus:

- Aurigequula fasciata (Lacépède, 1803) (Striped ponyfish)
- Aurigequula longispinis (Valenciennes, 1835) (Longspine ponyfish)
- Aurigequula striata (James & Badrudeen, 1991) (Striated ponyfish)
