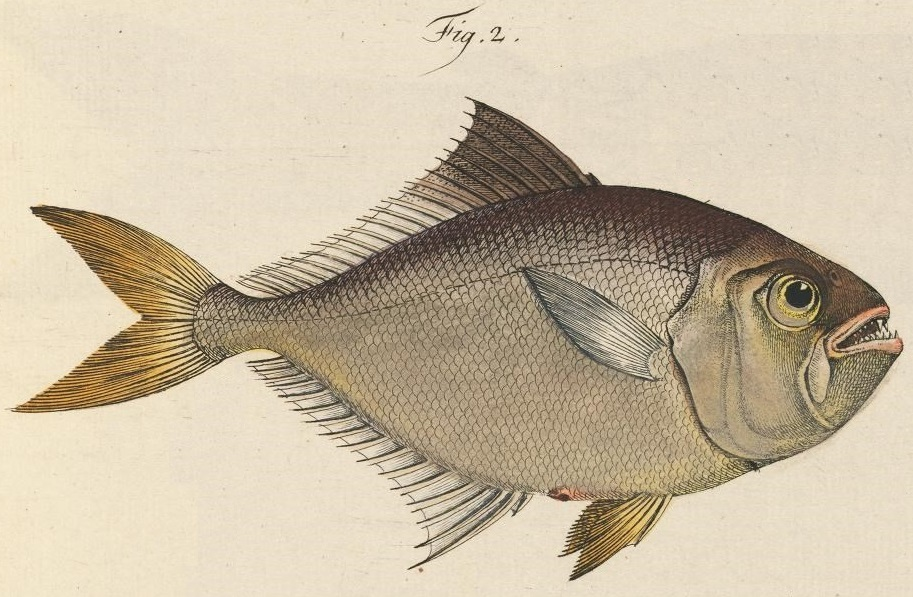
- G. minuta.
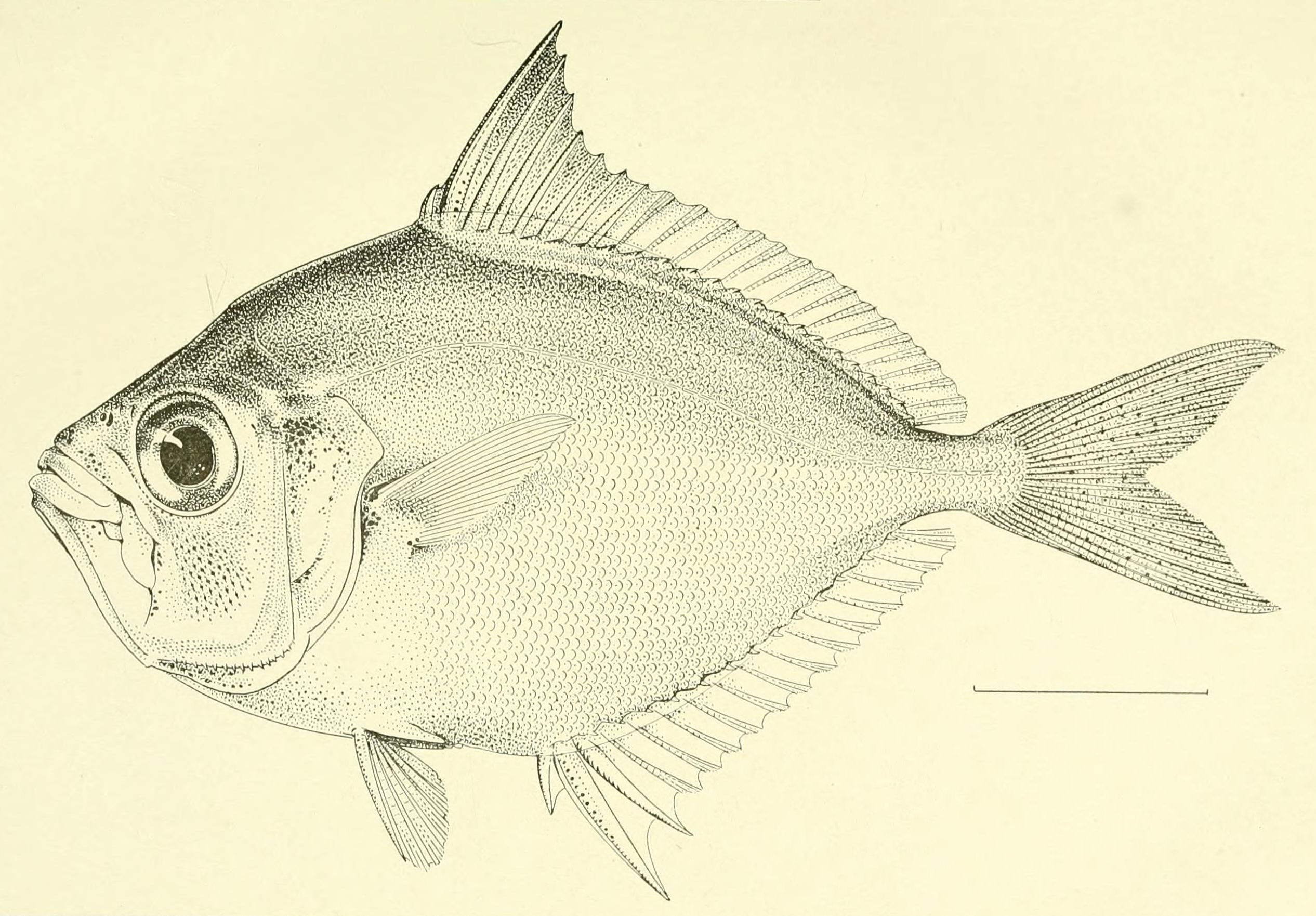
- G. achlamys.

Scientific classification
- Kingdom: Animalia
- Phylum: Chordata
- Class: Actinopterygii
- Order: Acanthuriformes
- Family: Leiognathidae
- Subfamily: Gazzinae
- Genus: Gazza; Rüppell, 1835

Type species
- Gazza equulaeformis Rüppell, 1835

= Gazza (fish) =

Genus of ray-finned fishes

Gazza is a genus of marine ray-finned fishes, ponyfishes from the family Leiognathidae which are native to the Indian Ocean and the western Pacific Ocean.

== Species ==
There are currently five recognized species in this genus:

- Gazza achlamys D. S. Jordan & Starks, 1917 (Smalltoothed ponyfish)
- Gazza dentex (Valenciennes in Cuvier & Valenciennes, 1835) (Ovoid toothpony)
- Gazza minuta (Bloch, 1795) (Toothpony)
- Gazza rhombea Kimura, Yamashita & Iwatsuki, 2000 (Rhomboid toothpony)
- Gazza squamiventralis Yamashita & Kimura, 2001 (Scaled belly toothpony)
