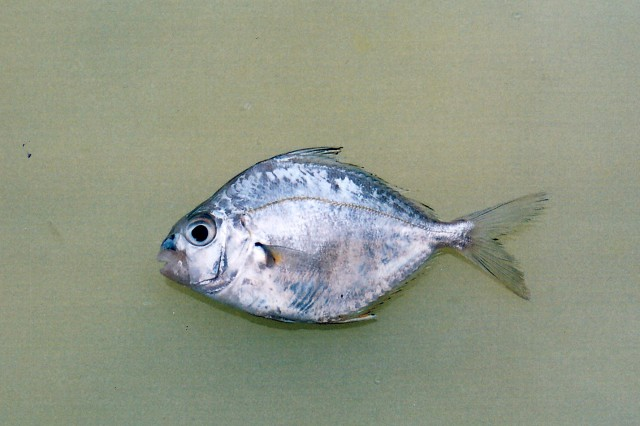

Scientific classification
- Kingdom: Animalia
- Phylum: Chordata
- Class: Actinopterygii
- Order: Acanthuriformes
- Family: Leiognathidae
- Genus: Eubleekeria
- Species: E. jonesi

Binomial name
- Eubleekeria jonesi (P.S.B.R. James, 1971)

Synonyms
- Leiognathus jonesi James, 1971

= Eubleekeria jonesi =

Species of ray-finned fish

Eubleekeria jonesi, commonly known as Jones’s pony fish, is a marine ray-finned fish, a ponyfish from the family Leiognathidae. It is native to the Indian Ocean. This species was first formally described as Leiognathus jonesi in 1971 by the Indian ichthyologist P.S.B.R. James (1934-2019) and

== Etymology ==
The fish's specific name honours James’ predecessor as director of the Indian Central Marine Fisheries Institute in Kochi, Santhappan Jones (1910-1997).
