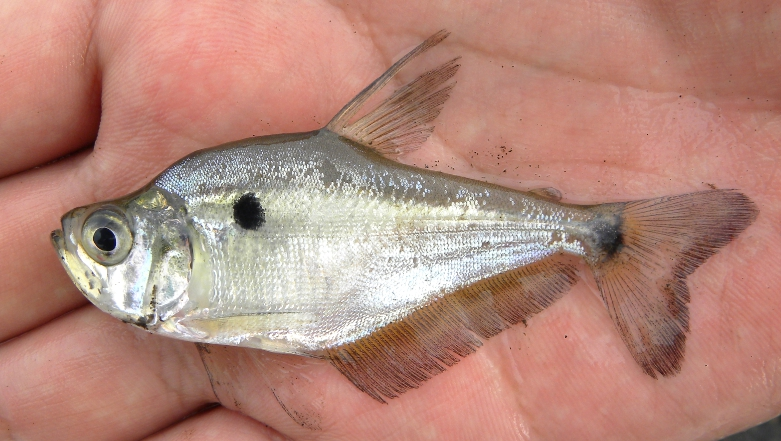

Conservation status
- Least Concern (IUCN 3.1)

Scientific classification
- Kingdom: Animalia
- Phylum: Chordata
- Class: Actinopterygii
- Order: Characiformes
- Family: Characidae
- Genus: Roeboides
- Species: R. microlepis

Binomial name
- Roeboides microlepis Reinhardt, 1851

Synonyms
- Epicyrtus microlepis Reinhardt, 1851; Anacyrtus (Raeboides) bonariensis Steindachner, 1879; Roeboides bonariensis (Steindachner, 1879)

= Roeboides microlepis =

Species of fish

Roeboides microlepis is a species of freshwater ray-finned fish, a characin, belonging to the family Characidae. This species is the type species of the genus Roeboides. R. microlepis is found in southern South America.
