= Roeboides bussingi =

Conservation status
- Data Deficient (IUCN 3.1)

Scientific classification
- Kingdom: Animalia
- Phylum: Chordata
- Class: Actinopterygii
- Order: Characiformes
- Family: Characidae
- Genus: Roeboides
- Species: R. bussingi

Binomial name
- Roeboides bussingi Matamoros, Chakrabarty, Angulo, Garita-Alvarado, and McMahan, 2013

Species of fish

Roeboides bussingi is a species of characin native to the Pacific slope of Costa Rica and Panama. It is the only member of the genus found in the Coto Colorado River. It was described to science as a new species in 2013.

== Description ==
Roeboides bussingi grows to lengths of around 5.9 cm (2.3 in). It possesses silvery scales across the entire body, with areas missing scales being completely transparent, as well as a lateral green stripe. The fins are orange-yellow in color and a dark spot can be found on the caudal peduncle.

== Etymology ==
The specific name, bussingi, honors William Bussing, a prominent Costa Rican ichthyologist who spent his career studying Central American fishes. He was also the first to propose R. bussingi as a new species.
