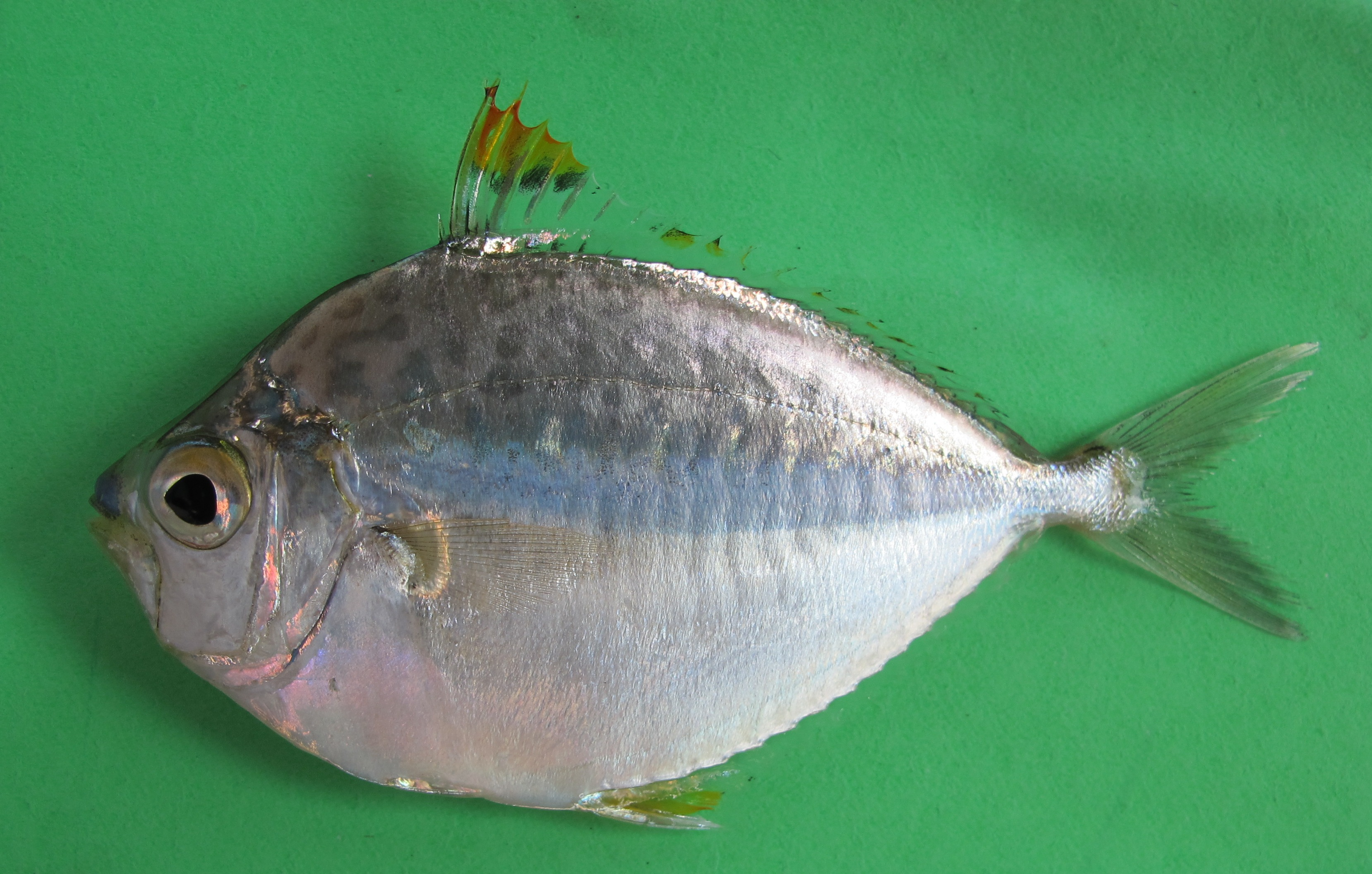
- Photopectoralis bindus

Scientific classification
- Kingdom: Animalia
- Phylum: Chordata
- Class: Actinopterygii
- Order: Acanthuriformes
- Family: Leiognathidae
- Subfamily: Gazzinae
- Genus: Photopectoralis; Sparks, Dunlap & W. L. Smith, 2005

Type species
- Leiognathus aureus Abe & Haneda, 1972

= Photopectoralis =

Genus of ray-finned fishes

Photopectoralis is a genus of marine ray-finned fishes, ponyfish from the family Leiognathidae. They are native to the Indian Ocean and the western Pacific Ocean.

== Species ==
There are four recognized species in this genus:

- Photopectoralis aureus (T. Abe & Haneda, 1972) (Golden ponyfish)
- Photopectoralis bindus (Valenciennes, 1835) (Orangefin ponyfish)
- Photopectoralis hataii (T. Abe & Haneda, 1972) (Hatai's ponyfish)
- Photopectoralis panayensis (Seishi Kimura & Dunlap, 2003) (Panay ponyfish)
