= Halieutichthys bispinosus =

Conservation status
- Least Concern (IUCN 3.1)

Scientific classification
- Kingdom: Animalia
- Phylum: Chordata
- Class: Actinopterygii
- Order: Lophiiformes
- Family: Ogcocephalidae
- Genus: Halieutichthys
- Species: H. bispinosus

Binomial name
- Halieutichthys bispinosus H. C. Ho, Chakrabarty & Sparks, 2010

Species of fish

Halieutichthys bispinosus, the two-spine batfish or spiny batfish, is a species of marine ray-finned fish belonging to the family Ogcocephalidae, the deep-sea batfishes or seabats. This species is found in the Western Atlantic Ocean.

== Taxonomy ==
Halieutichthys bispinosus was first formally described in 2010 by Ho Hsuan-Ching, Prosanta Chakrabarty and John Stephen Sparks with its type locality give as the Gulf of Mexico, off Florida at 7°24'11"N, 84°07'11"W. This species was previously overlooked as H. aculeatus and, alongside H. intermedius, these three species form the aculeatus species complex within the genus Halieutichthys. H. intermedius also being described as a new species by Ho, Chakrabarty and Sparks in 2010. The genus Halieutichthys is classified within the "Eastern Pacific/Western Atlantic clade" of the family Ogcocephalidae. The family Ogcocephalidae is classified in the monotypic suborder Ogcocephaloidei within the order Lophiiformes, the anglerfishes in the 5th edition of Fishes of the World.

== Etymology ==
Halieutichthys bispinosus has the genus name Halieutichthys which combines the genus name Halieutaea, for the similarity of these fishes to the species in that genus, and ichthys, the Greek word for "fish". The specific name, bispinosus, means "two spined", an allusion to well-developed inner and outer tubercles behend the eye.

== Description ==
Halieutichthys bispinosus has a flattened head and body which are widened into a rounded disc, with a moderately long tail. The mouth is very small, as is the illicial cavity on the snout, which is covered by puffy, membranous folds. The esca is a single bulb. The pupils are covered. There is a buckler at the angle of the preoperculum which is not larger than the nearby bucklers. The openings of the gills are small, and they are located to the rear of the upper base of the pectoral fins. The gill rakers are similar to small teeth set on short stalks. They have small dorsal and anal fins which are located to the rear of the body. The bases of the pectoral fins have a wide attachment to the body and the pelvic fins are not reduced in size. The lateral line is complete and there are a pair of lateral line organs on the caudal peduncle behind the anus. There are no tubercles along the lateral line. The scales are large, irregular, pitted tubercles; with many tubercles on the caudal peduncle while the tubercles on the upper body are relatively large and sharp with a row of tubercles typically present above eye. There is a triangle of 3 tubercles on the side of each shoulder behind eye with all 3 tubercles being well developed and are sharply pointed. The adults are scaleless on the underside of the body and large areas of the upperside are also without scales. The body is greenish to dark brown in color, with a pale reticulated pattern on its upper surface. The pectoral fins have a wide outer dark bar and an inner dark bar, both reaching across the width of the fin, separated by a vivid white bar, and the margin of the fin is typically yellow. The juveniles are similar to the adults but have a large black blotch on the pectoral fin that does not extend across the whole fin. This species has a maximum standard length of 9.9 cm (3.9 in).

== Distribution and habitat ==
Halieutichthys bispinosus is found in the Western Atlantic Ocean from Vitginia south to the Gulf of Mexico, including the northern Bahamas butit is apparently absent from Cuban waters. It is found between 0 and 400 m (0 and 1,312 ft), typically less than 100 m (330 ft), on sandy substrates.
