= Louisiana pancake batfish =

Scientific classification
- Kingdom: Animalia
- Phylum: Chordata
- Class: Actinopterygii
- Division: Teleostei
- Order: Lophiiformes
- Family: Ogcocephalidae
- Genus: Halieutichthys
- Species: H. intermedius

Binomial name
- Halieutichthys intermedius H. C. Ho, Chakrabarty & Sparks, 2010

Species of fish

The Louisiana pancake batfish, Halieutichthys intermedius, belongs to the batfish family Ogcocephalidae. It is native to the Gulf of Mexico, and was discovered in 2010. The known range of the species lies within the area of the Gulf of Mexico which was affected by the Deepwater Horizon oil spill.

== Distribution and habitat ==
Since 1818 thought to be a single species, these fish were determined in 2010 to be divided into three distinct species, the others being Halieutichthys aculeatus and Halieutichthys bispinosus. While the other batfish are found along the Atlantic coast from Louisiana to North Carolina, the Louisiana pancake batfish is only found in the Gulf of Mexico in a range entirely covered by the effects of the Deepwater Horizon oil spill. They live at depths of up to 400 metres (1,300 ft). Although numbers are not precisely known, in the initial trawl which led to their discovery out of around 100,000 fish only three were pancake batfish.

== Description ==
Hsuan-Ching Ho, of the Academia Sinica in Taipei, Taiwan (now in National Museum of Marine Biology & Aquarium, Taiwan), discovered the Louisiana pancake batfish when he was visiting colleagues in the American Museum of Natural History, New York. They noted that the specimens of the pancake batfish in the collection of the museum were actually three species, not a single one as previously thought. Trawling expeditions were conducted and consistent differences were identified in those found. He joined with John Sparks and Prosanta Chakrabarty, of the American Museum of Natural History to write the description that appeared in Journal of Fish Biology.

Pancake batfish are so named from their body shape, which is flattened with an enlarged head and trunk giving a rounded disc shape. Their motion on the ocean floor, like other batfish, is described as being like a bat crawling. They have pectoral fins which resemble limbs and the batfish use these together with their smaller pelvic fins to 'walk' along the ocean floor. They feed on invertebrates, and use chemical lures to catch prey. They are small enough to fit in the palm of a human hand and are described as being as thick as a "fluffy pancake".

The Louisiana pancake batfish was named as one of the top ten new species of 2010 by the International Institute for Species Exploration at Arizona State University. John Sparks, credited as one of the discoverers of the species, said "If we are still finding new species of fishes in the Gulf, imagine how much diversity, especially microdiversity, is out there that we do not know about".
