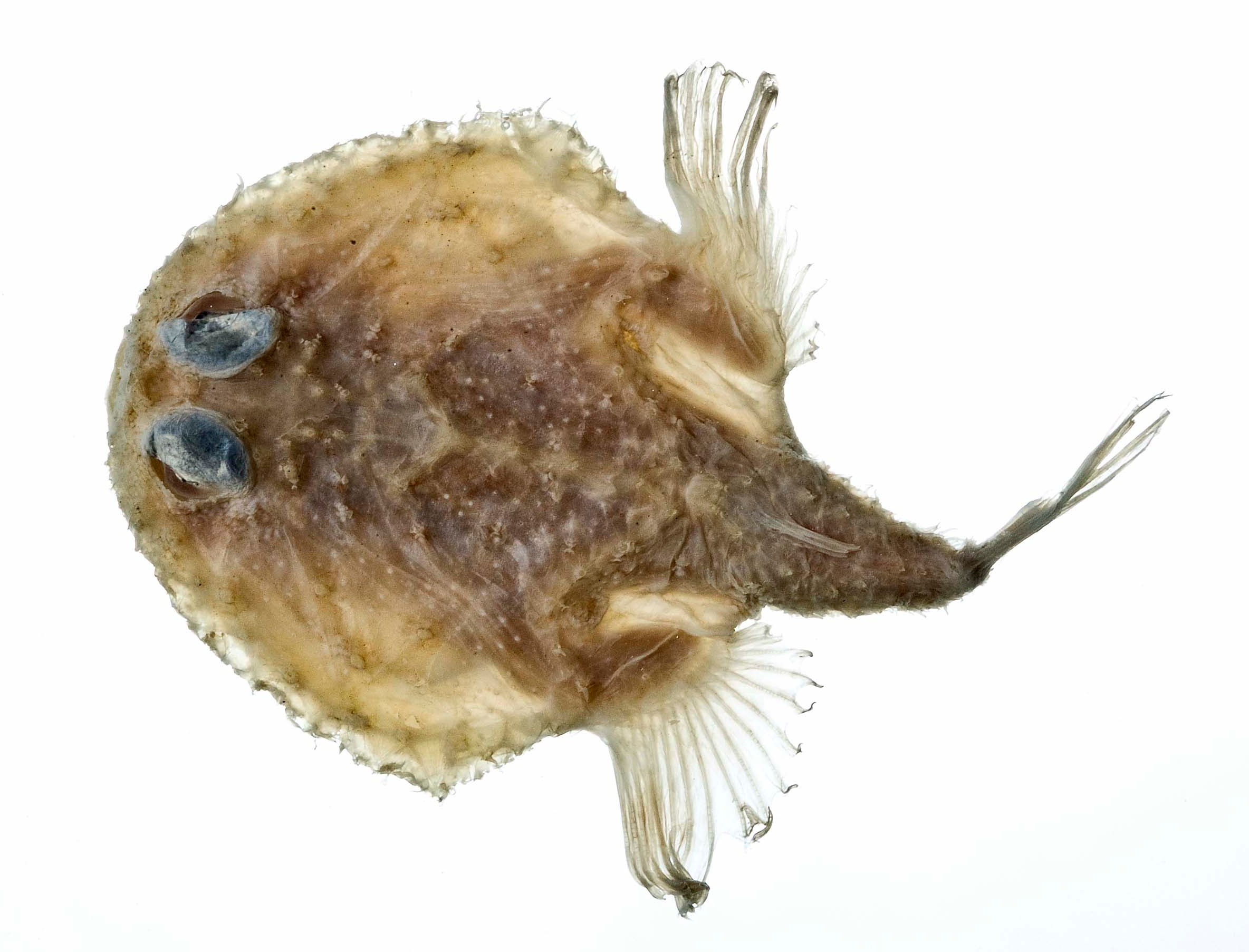

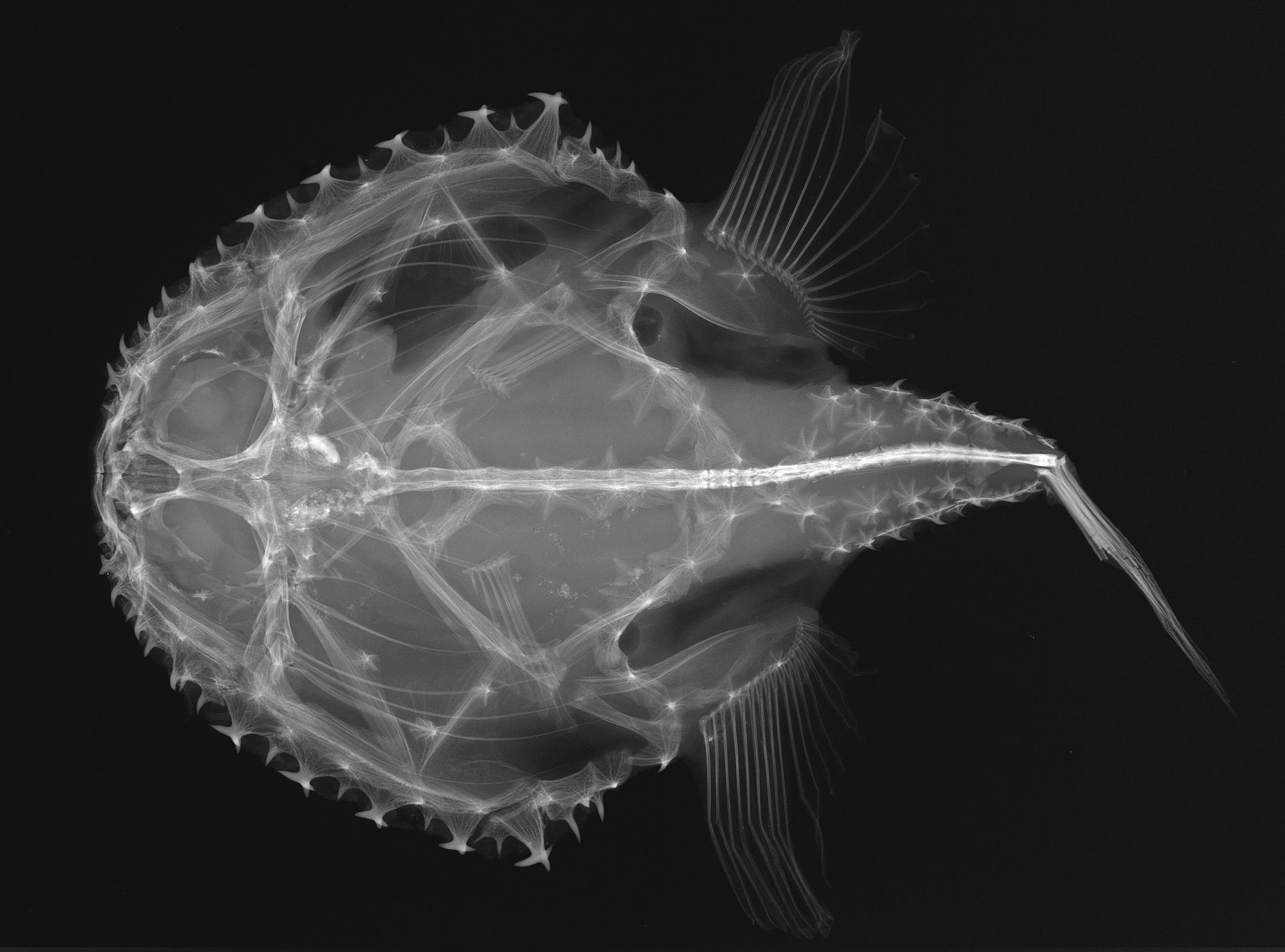
- Halieutichthys aculeatus, conventional and X-ray images

Conservation status
- Least Concern (IUCN 3.1)

Scientific classification
- Kingdom: Animalia
- Phylum: Chordata
- Class: Actinopterygii
- Order: Lophiiformes
- Family: Ogcocephalidae
- Genus: Halieutichthys
- Species: H. aculeatus

Binomial name
- Halieutichthys aculeatus (Mitchill, 1818)
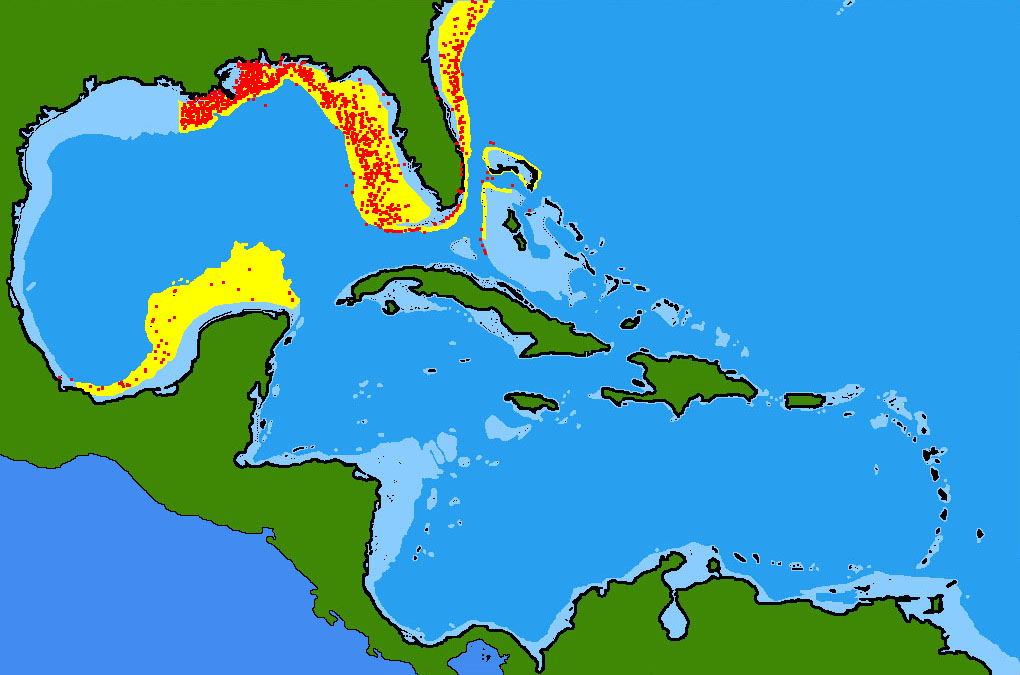

Synonyms
- Lophius aculeatus Mitchill, 1818; Halieutichthys reticulatus Poey, 1863; Halieutella lappa Goode & T. H. Bean, 1884

= Pancake batfish =

Species of fish

The pancake batfish (Halieutichthys aculeatus), Atlantic pancake batfish, Louisiana pancake batfish or spiny batfish, is a species of marine ray-finned fish belonging to the family Ogcocephalidae, the deep sea batfishes or seabats. This species is found in the Western Atlantic Ocean.

== Taxonomy ==
The pancake batfish was first formally described in 1818 as Lophius aculeatus by the American naturalist Samuel Mitchill with the original type locality given as the Strait of Bahamas, with a neotype later being designated "from 32°28'N, 78°47'09"W, about 92.4 kilometers at 107° off Off Charleston Light, South Carolina, USA". Although Lophius aculeatus was preoccupied by L. aculeatus Walbaum, 1792, this synonym of Lophius piscatorius was never used and Mitchill's name is a nomen protectum. In 1863 the Cuban zoologist Felipe Poey was credited by Theodore Gill with the name Halieutichthys reticulatus and with proposing the new monospecific genus Halieutichthys. Poey's H. reticulatus is now considered to be a synonym of Mitchill's L. aculeatus, and is the type species of its genus by monotypy. This species, alongside H. bispinosus and H. intermedius make up the aculeatusspecies complex within the genus Halieutichthys. The genus Halieutichthys is classified within the "Eastern Pacific/Western Atlantic clade" of the family Ogcocephalidae. The family Ogcocephalidae is classified in the monotypic suborder Ogcocephaloidei within the order Lophiiformes, the anglerfishes in the 5th edition of Fishes of the World.

== Etymology ==
The pancake batfish belongs to the genus Halieutichthys which combines the genus name Halieutaea, for the similarity of these fishes to the species in that genus, and ichthys, the Greek word for "fish". The specific name, aculeatus, means "spined" or "sharply pointed", an allusion to the prickly back and edge of the disc.

== Description ==
The pancake batfish has a flattened head and body which are widened into a rounded disc, with a moderately long tail. The mouth is very small, as is the illicial cavity on the snout which is covered by puffy, membranous folds. The esca is a single bulb. The pupils are covered. There is a buckler at the angle of the preoperculum which is not larger than the nearby bucklers. The openings of the gills are small and they are located to the rear of the upper base of the pectoral fins. The gill rakers are similar to small teeth set on short stalks. They have small dorsal and anal fins which are located to the rear of the body. The bases of the pectoral fins have a wide attachment to the body and the pelvic fins are not reduced in size. The lateral line is complete and there are a pair of lateral line organs on the caudal peduncle behind the anus. There are no tubercles along the lateral line. The scales are large, irregular, pitted tubercles; with few, sparse tubercles on the caudal peduncle while the tubercles on the upper body are relatively small and sharp, although they are only rarely present over the eye. There is a triangle of 3 tubercles on the side of each shoulder to the rear of the eye with the innermost tubercle being small and blunt, The adults are scaleless on the underside of the body and large areas of the upperside are also without scales. This species is distinguished from other members of the aculeatus species complex by the two narrow black bands across its pectoral fins. There is a rather fine reticulated pattern of color on the upper body surface, made up of a dense pattern of melanophores. This is a rather small species with the adult body size usually reaching a standard length of no greater than 7 cm (2.8 in), the maximum published total length of 10 cm (3.9 in).

== Distribution and habitat ==
The pancake batfish is found in the western Atlantic Ocean where it has been recorded from Cape Hatteras in North Carolina southwards along southeastern coast of the United States to the northwestern Bahamas. In the Gulf of Mexico it has been recorded from the Florida Keys north to Louisiana, as well as from Tabasco, Mexico. Records from farther south need verification. This demersal fish is found at depths between 5 and 422 m (16 and 1,385 ft), typically between 50 and 150 m (160 and 490 ft), on soft sediments.

== Biology ==
The pancake batfish partially buries itself in the sediment. Like other anglerfishes, this species is an ambush predator that preys on small gastropods, bivalves and crustaceans, as well as polychaete worms and rarely small fishes. The eggs and larvae are pelagic and metamorphosis begins when the larvae settle on the substrate.
