= Ryoko Kimura =

Japanese contemporary artist who works in Nihonga painting

- 木村了子
- Born: Kyoto, Japan
- Education: Master's Degree, Tokyo National University of Fine Arts and Music, 1997
- Known for: Contemporary Art, Nihonga painting
- Website: http://ryokokimura.com/index.html

Ryoko Kimura (木村了子, Kimura Ryoko, born 1971) is a Japanese contemporary artist who works in Nihonga painting. She studied at Tokyo National University of Fine Arts and Music, graduating from the oil painting course in 1995, and earning her master's degree in 1997. Her artwork subject weigh is traditional Bijin-ga (literally "beautiful person picture") but rather than depicting women, she instead observes the male figure from the "sexual gaze from a heterosexual female standpoint." Her artwork has been exhibited in Japan, Taiwan, China, France, Germany, and USA.

== Art style ==
Kimura frequently depicts the motif of ikemen (good-looking men) and notes her inspiration from "Johnny's boys", a male entertainment and talent agency famous in Japan. Though her backgrounds and Nihonga style appear quite conservative and hearken back to Muromachi Period works, her modern human subjects and inversion of the male-gaze from Bijin-ga demonstrate her contemporary influences. She is also inspired by stained glass of Christian art, which she studied before seriously pursuing painting from 2003. In an essay, Kimura compares the black sumi ink outlines of Nihonga to the thick linework in stained glass windows.

In 2007, Christie's reported that her painting of Beauty of My Dish, which was of a man's body dish for L'opera gateau au chocolat was sold at auction for HKD 247,500.

== Exhibitions ==
=== Solo exhibitions ===
- 2007 "Prince Come True" GalleryES / Produced by Mizuma Action, Tokyo, Nippon
- 2008 "Prince Come True" The Butchart International Contemporary Art Space, Taipei, Taiwan
- 2009 "Born to be Wild" Mizuma and One Gallery, Beijing, China
- 2009 "Born to be Wild" The Butchart International Contemporary Art Space, Taipai, Taiwan
- 2010 "The Date for Marriage Hunting ★ Sugoroku" Kido press, Tokyo, Japan
- 2011 "Paradise" Mizuma Action, Tokyo, Japan
- 2012 "La Fascination des Beaux Hommes" Galerie Vanessa Rau, Paris, France
- 2013 "Ma Petite Avanture – Where is my Prince?" Kanazawa Art Gummi, Kanazawa, Japan
- 2014 "Be your animals" Toraumaris Space, Tokyo, Japan
- 2015 "Beaute Animale de L'Hmme" Galerie Vanessa Rau, Paris, France.
- 2016 "IkemenMärchen" Artcomplex Center of Tokyo, Tokyo, Japan.
- 2018 "Tenderheartedness" Kyoto-ba, Kyoto, Japan
- 2021 Solo show at Dub Gallery Akihabara, Tokyo, Japan

=== Group exhibitions ===
- 2010 "The 6th Chinese Character Festival. Making Waves Contemporary Art Exhibition" National Chiang Kai-shek Memorial Hall, Taipei, Taiwan.
- 2010 "Gold Experience: Contemporary Painting with Gold Leaf from Korea and Japan "Hyun Gallery Seoul, Korea.
- 2010 "ELe Japon Vintage et Contemporian "Galerie Vanessa Rau, Paris, France.
- 2011 "Gekitotsu -ten "unseal contemporary, Tokyo, Japan.
- 2011 "Kan-Hikari Art Expo" Jijo Castle, Kyoto, Japan.
- 2012 "Gold Experience 2: – Homage to the Golden Tiger fish," Planet Gallery of Aichi Prefectural University of Fine Arts and Music, Nagoya Japan
- 2013 "Tainai-meguri & Miyage of Gazoku" The Kyoto traditional craft Museum, Kyoto Japan
- 2013 "Soluble Fish Continued Realities s" Gallery Fleur of Kyoto SEIKA University of Fine Arts, Kyoto Japan
- 2013 "Kizuna – emerging women artists from Japan" Micheko Galerie, Munich Germany
- 2013" Tokyo Miyage of Gazoku "Book gallery Popotam, Tokyo Japan
- 2013" View of the movie world of Mitani Kouki by Taneda Yohei "The Ueno Royal Museum Tokyo Japan
- 2014 "Koganecho Bazzar 2014" "Yokohama, Japan.
- 2014 "Impacts! Japan Art Festival" Zane Bennet Contemporary Art Santa-fe, USA
- 2014 "Zauberbox" Micheko Galerie, Munich Germany
- 2015 "for humans" Jiro Miura Gallery, Tokyo, Japan.
- 2016–17 "Imayō: Japan's New Traditionalists" The Art Gallery at the University of Hawai'i at Mānoa, Honolulu Museum of Art Honolulu, USA, Shoto Museum of Art Tokyo Japan.
- 2016–17 "Asian contemporary Scene Part I" Modern Art Museum Shanghai China
- 2019 "Eyes & Curiosity ー Flowers in the Field" Mizuma Gallery, Singapore
- 2021 "Handsome Men They Are" Museum of Modern Art, Saitama, Japan

== Collections ==
Her work is featured in the public collections of the Spencer Museum of Art and Honolulu Museum of Art.
