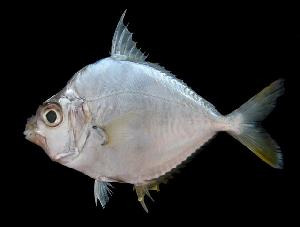

Conservation status
- Least Concern (IUCN 3.1)

Scientific classification
- Kingdom: Animalia
- Phylum: Chordata
- Class: Actinopterygii
- Order: Acanthuriformes
- Family: Leiognathidae
- Genus: Leiognathus
- Species: L. equula

Binomial name
- Leiognathus equula (Forsskål, 1775)

Synonyms
- Scomber equula Forsskål, 1775; Leiognathus equulus (Forsskål, 1775); Scomber edentulus Bloch, 1795; Equula edentula (Bloch, 1795); Leiognathus edentulus (Bloch, 1795); Leiognathus argenteus Lacépède, 1802; Equula ensifera Cuvier, 1829; Equula totta Cuvier, 1829; Equula caballa Valenciennes, 1835; Leiognathus obscura Seale, 1901

= Common ponyfish =

Species of ray-finned fish

Leiognathus equula, the common ponyfish is a species of marine ray-finned fish, a ponyfish from the family Leiognathidae. It may also sometimes be referred to as Leiognathus argenteus, which is a junior synonym to L. equula.

== Taxonomy ==
The Common Ponyfish belongs to a family of ray-finned fish called Leiognathidae, which are also known as ponyfishes and slipmouths. They originally belonged to the order Perciformes before being reclassified to order Chaetodontiformes and most recently ending up within the order Acanthuriformes.

The family is currently divided into 10 distinct genera, including Aurigequula, Equulites, Eubleekeria, Gazza, Karaite, Leigonathus, Nuchequula, Photolateralis, Secutor/Deveximentum, and Photopectoralis, all of which have a nearly identical physical appearance. With such similar internal and external characteristics making classification difficult, the result has been the creation of “wastebasket” species like Aurigequula fasciata and Leiognathus equula.

== Description ==
Ponyfishes in general are described by their mouths, which are highly protractile and extend ventrorostrally, rostrally and dorsorostrally.

As one of the largest Leiognathid species, the common ponyfish can reach over 150 millimetres (5.9 in) and up to 240 millimetres (9.4 in) in length as adults with a weight between 60-200g, with females having a greater mean total length and body weight. The fork length of most females ranges from 130–200 millimetres (5.1–7.9 in) with a weight of 60–200 grams (2.1–7.1 oz). For males, the fork length ranges between 130-190mm with a weight of 60–180 grams (2.1–6.3 oz). Different regions report different sizes for this species. This could mean that fish size is impacted by geographic location, specifically the frequency of fishing and food availability in that area. They have deep bodies that are laterally compressed and resemble a rhombus in terms of shape. They are covered in cycloid scales, excepting its head (which is asquamate) and are generally/mostly a lighter silvery-grey in color but may be a darker grey or brown color in some spots- particularly as a band around its lateral line and back or on the caudal peduncle. There is also some yellow coloring on its fins. Its lateral line is lightly curved and made up of 63-70 pored scales.

They have a single dorsal fin with 8 spines and 16 rays, as well as an anal fin that has 3 spines and 14 rays. Both the dorsal and anal fins have membranous sheaths covering their base along with having the second spine as the longest one. Its pectoral and subthoracic ventral fins are rather rounded, though the pectoral fins are longer and wider. Its caudal fin is forked, with both of the tips being rounded. In juveniles, the terminal ventral fin reaches the origin of the anal fin.

They have a shortened snout as well as a small, slightly downward facing terminal mouth and a concave jaw. Inside their mouths there are 3-4 rows of pointed and bristled teeth arranged in a way that curved inward. In addition, their eyes are somewhat large and contain an underdeveloped adipose eyelid. They also have a ‘fin lock’ mechanism as well as preorbital spines with serrated ridges.

It is difficult to distinguish between male and female Leiognathids of many species from just appearance, including L. equula. The most effective way that has been found to differentiate them is using the circumesophageal light organ, which every member of Leognathidae possesses. There is a strong sexual dimorphism in regards to this light producing organ. In males, it is larger and also has additional features which assist in photic communication, specifically in sexual displays.

== Distribution ==
The common ponyfish is a tropical and subtropical, bottom-dwelling species that inhabits coastal waters, river estuaries, fresh waters, brackish waters as well as benthopelagic environments. Though they are most commonly found in the sea at depths between 10–200 metres (33–656 ft).

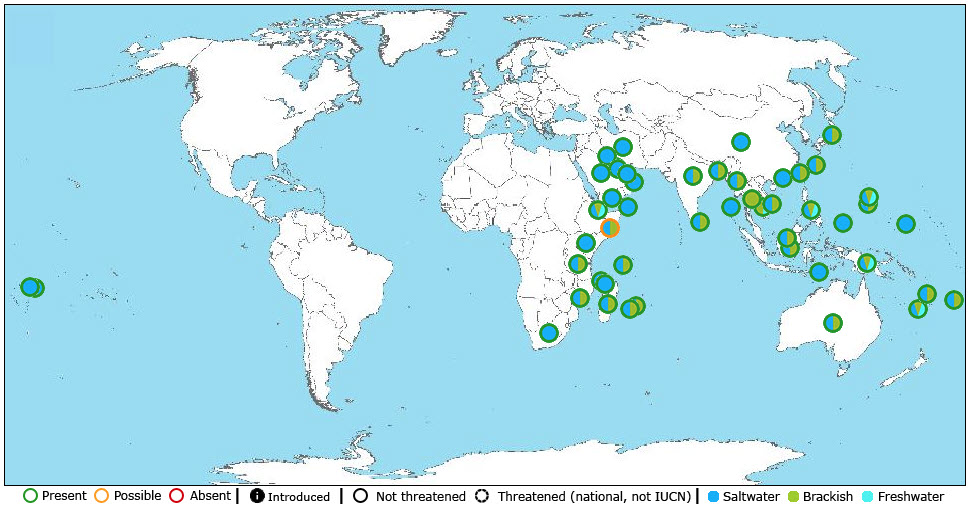
Global Distribution of L. eqfuula

It is widespread across the Red Sea, Persian Gulf and the Indo-West Pacific Ocean. It may also be found within the coastal regions of Taiwan and Taiwan Strait, southern Japan and the Ryukyu islands, some areas of the Nansha islands, Hainan island, Guangdong, Beibu Gulf, Guangxi, the east coast of Africa, Queensland (Australia), New Caledonia and the islands of Mariana, Caroline and Samoa.

== Life History ==
These fish are zoobenthic feeders and their diet consists of small invertebrates and plankton, especially Pseudodiaptomus stuhlmanni and polychaetes. Their growth pattern is described as ‘negative allometric growth’, meaning they increase in length at a faster rate than they gain weight.

=== Larval Anatomy & Development ===
Knowledge about the early life history of leiognathids is limited, however there are three species that are known to produce small pelagic eggs, which measure 0.6–0.7 millimetres (0.024–0.028 in) in diameter.

As larvae, they are deep bodied and laterally compressed, like their adult counterpart and with a compactly coiled gut. Their relative depth of body increases with growth. They also lack scales, though the anterior part of the lateral line is present.

Their coloring increases as they grow, initially being very lightly pigmented. As they begin to mature and pigment is gained, it mostly concentrated in certain areas. Specifically, the fore, mid and hind brains as well as internally over the gut and then lastly in patches on the trunk and tail. There is no pigment on pectoral or pelvic fins.

Further characteristics of L. equula larvae include a well-developed spine locking mechanism in the dorsal and anal fins, and a large head with a deep dorsal profile, which becomes less steep as the fish grows. Some of the smaller specimens have been noted to have prominent spines on their heads, but no spines on the opercular, interopercular, or subopercular bones. The spines on the outer border of the preoperculum decrease in number with age, while those on the inner border remain relatively constant. Other internal features include a gas bladder positioned dorsal to the apex of the gut and a gap between the anus and anal fin that widens with growth. They also have Gill membranes attached to the isthmus about half way between the posterior edge of the eye and the upper limb of the preopercle. Their light organs are present in larvae as well, and are well developed in individuals as small as 5.2mm.

=== Reproduction ===
In southern Taiwan they are known to spawn between May and August, though this is not necessarily the case in other regions. In Queensland, Australia many smaller individuals (7.5–82.5 millimetres (0.30–3.25 in)) can be found within mangrove estuaries from December to February. For this reason, it is believed that larvae have an estuarine distribution. In terms of sex ratios, a greater number of males are found from March to May, while a greater number of females are found from June to February. The sex ratio tends to increase with body size, which could relate to males having a higher mortality rate compared with females, who have a longer lifespan. Females also generally reach maturity sooner than males but this sometimes differs based on location, likely due to environmental factors.

Oocyte development in common ponyfish has been found to have eight stages:

1. Chromating-nucleolus stage- very small oocytes, large nuclei surrounded by thin layer of cytoplasm
2. Peri-nucleolus stage- oocyte volume increases, ratio of nucleus to cytoplasm decreases
3. Yolk vesicle stage
4. Primary yolk stage- yolk globules and vesicles increase in number and size
5. Secondary yolk stage- rapid increase in numbers and size of yolk globules and vesicles
6. Tertiary yolk stage- oocytes increase in size, yolk globules begin to form yolk mass
7. Migratory nucleus stage- yolk forms as a homogeneous mass, nucleus moves towards animal pole of egg
8. Ripe stage- nuclear membrane disappears, egg translucent and white

== Cultural and Economic Value ==
The Leiognathus equula is an important prey item for commercial fish species but is also commercially important in Asian wild fisheries and aquaculture as both a fresh and processed product. It is commercially fished in South China and holds strong economic importance in Hainan, where it is often sold alongside Pampus argenteus, though for a lower price. It is also frequently used in Indonesia, where it is often boiled and salted, and is known to be exploited by fishermen as a result. Wild catch rates for this species in the West Central Pacific were approximately 120,268 tons per year in the mid-1990s.
