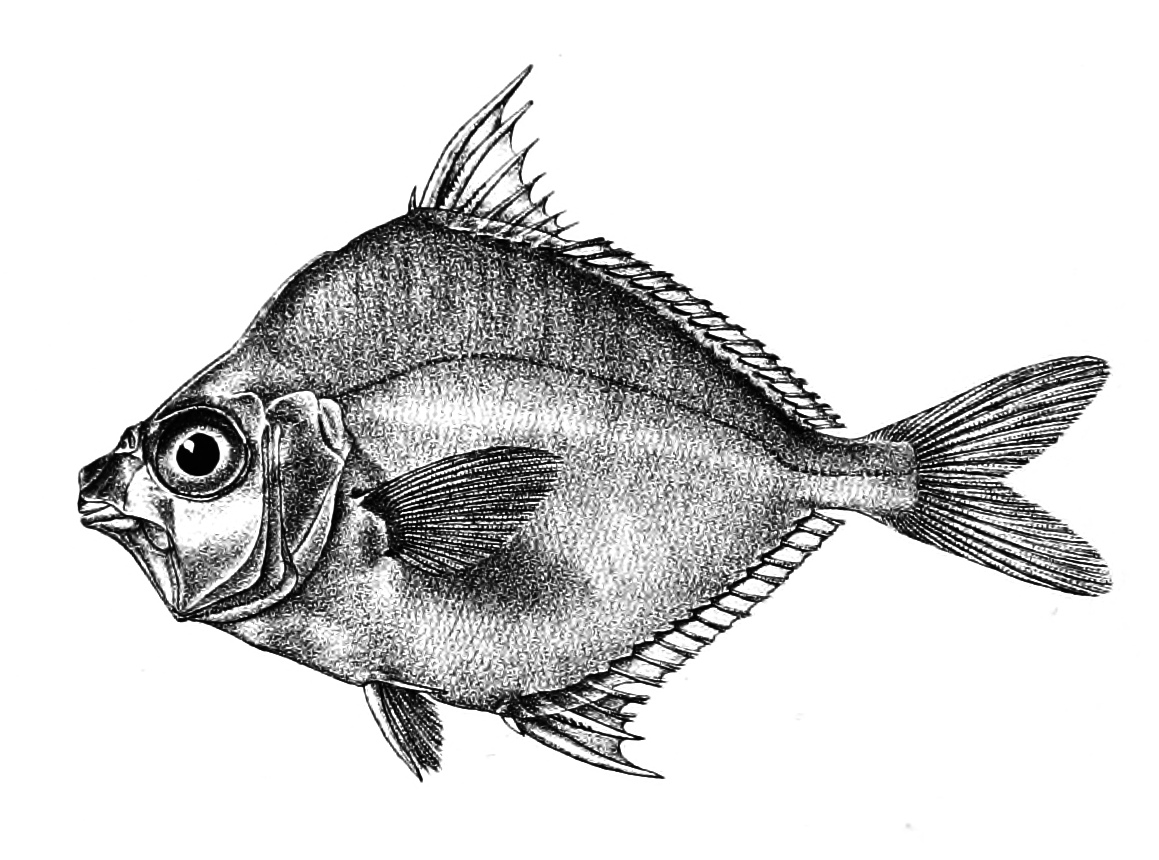

Scientific classification
- Kingdom: Animalia
- Phylum: Chordata
- Class: Actinopterygii
- Order: Acanthuriformes
- Family: Leiognathidae
- Subfamily: Leiognathinae
- Genus: Leiognathus; Lacépède, 1802

Type species
- Leiognathus argenteus Lacépède, 1802

Synonyms
- Argylepes Swainson, 1839; Equula Cuvier, 1815; Macilentichthys Whitley, 1932; Secutor Gistel, 1848

= Leiognathus =

Genus of ray-finned fishes

Leiognathus is a genus of marine ray-finned fishes, ponyfishes from the family Leiognathidae. They are native to the Indian Ocean and the western Pacific Ocean. They are sometimes known as silverbellies.

== Species ==
There are currently 4 recognized species in this genus:

- Leiognathus bindoides (Bleeker, 1851)
- Leiognathus equula (Forsskål, 1775) (Common ponyfish)
- Leiognathus parviceps (Valenciennes, 1835)
- Leiognathus robustus Sparks & Dunlap, 2004
