= Prosanta Chakrabarty =

American ichthyologist (born 1978)

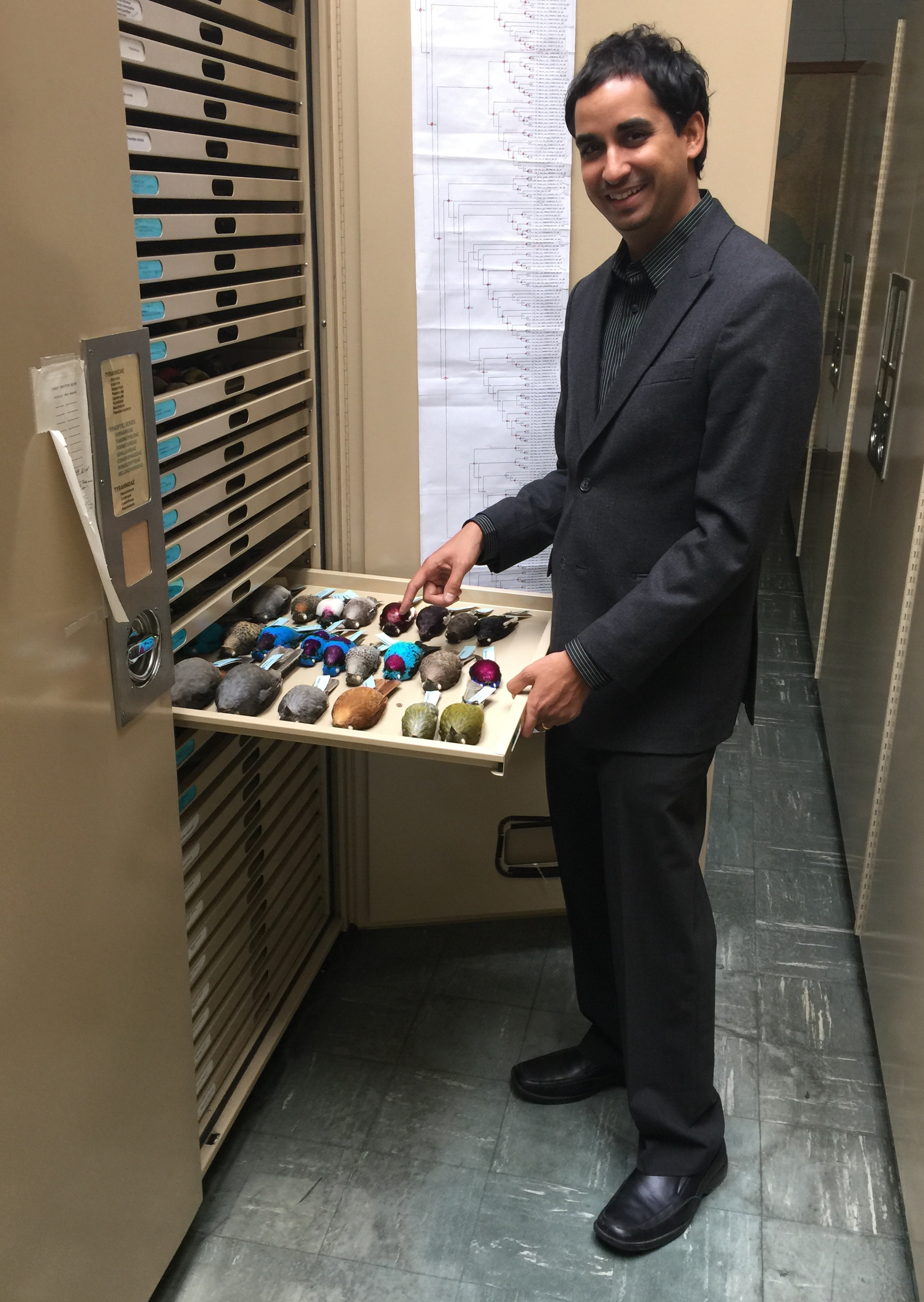
- Chakrabarty with zoological specimens at the LSU Museum of Natural Science
- Born: November 25, 1978 (age 47)
- Education: University of Michigan (PhD); McGill University (BSc)
- Scientific career
- Fields: Ichthyology, systematics
- Workplaces: Louisiana State University
- Website: www.prosanta.org http://www.prosanta.net

Prosanta Chakrabarty (born 25 November 1978) is an American ichthyologist and George H. Lowery Jr. Professor of ichthyology, evolution and systematics at Louisiana State University. He studied at McGill University where he received a bachelor of science in Applied Zoology and at the University of Michigan where he obtained his PhD in Ecology and Evolution. Among other professional positions he was a Program Director for the National Science Foundation and was the President of the American Society of Ichthyologist and Herpetologist in 2023. He was named a TED Fellow in 2016, and a TED Senior Fellow in 2018. He was named an Elected Fellow of the AAAS for "distinguished contributions to evolutionary biology, focusing on the bioluminescent systems and historical biogeography of freshwater fishes, and for effectively communicating science to the public".

== Research ==
Chakrabarty's research has described over 13 new species of fishes. In 2014 he discovered Hoosier cavefish with colleagues Jacques Prejean and Matthew Niemiller. Using phylogenetic systematics, geometric morphometrics among others tools, Prosanta Chakrabarty attempts to understand the evolution of biological diversity, molecular evolution, and conservation of marine and freshwater fishes.

== New species described by Prosanta Chakrabarty ==
1) Paretroplus tsimoly

2) Mystus falcarius

3) Nandus prolixus

4) Equulites laterofenestra

5) Nuchequula mannusella

6) Equulites absconditus

7) Milyeringa brooksi

8) Halieutichthys intermedius

9) Halieutichthys bispinosus

10) Profundulus kreiseri

11) Typhleotris mararybe

12) Roeboides bussingi

13) Amblyopsis hoosieri

14) Caecieleotris morrisi

15) Photolateralis polyfenestrus

== Awards and honors ==
2020 Named Fulbright Distinguished Chair in Ottawa Canada

2019 Elected Fellow of the American Association for the Advancement of Science

2018 Forty Under 40, Greater Baton Rouge Business Report

2018 Named a Senior Fellow at TED

2016 Named to the 2016 Class of TED Fellows

2015 Elected Secretary of the American Society of Ichthyologists and Herpetologists

2011Top Ten New Species Award, The International Institute for Species Exploration and the International Top 10 Selections Committee; with co-authors Hsuan-Ching Ho and John Sparks for the description of Halieutichthys intermedius

== Selected publications ==
=== Books ===
- Chakrabarty, Prosanta (2012). A Guide to Academia: Getting into and Surviving Grad School, Postdocs and a Research Job. Oxford: Wiley Blackwell. ISBN 9780470960417.
- Chakrabarty, Prosanta (2023). Explaining Life Through Evolution. Hayana: Penguin Random House. ISBN 9780670095100.

=== Journal articles ===
- Chakrabarty, P.; Faircloth, B. C.; Ludt, W. B.; McMahan, C. D.; Near, T. J.; Dornberg, A.; Albert, J. S.; Arroyave, J.; Stiassny, M. L. J.; Sorenson, L.; Alfaro, M. E. (2017). "Phylogenomic systematics of ostariophysan fishes: Ultraconserved elements support the surprising non-monophyly of Characiformes". Systematic Biology. 66 (6): 881–895. doi:10.1093/sysbio/syx038. PMID 28334176.
- Alda, F., Adams, A.J., McMillan, W.O., Chakrabarty, P. (2017) Complete mitochondrial genomes of three Neotropical sleeper gobies: Eleotris amblyopsis, Eleotris picta and Hemieleotris latifasciata (Gobiiformes: Eleotridae)Mitochondrial DNA Part B: Resources 2: 747-750.
- Butler, J.M., Whitlow, S.M., Gwan, A.P., Chakrabarty, P., Maruska, K.P. 2017. Swim bladder morphology changes with female reproductive state in the mouth brooding African cichlid Astatotilapia burtoni. Journal of Experimental Biology220: 4463-4470
- Alda, F., Adams, A.J., McMillan, W.O., Chakrabarty, P. 2018. Mitogenomic divergence between three pairs of putative geminate fishes from Panama. Mitochondrial DNA Part B 3: 1-5.
- Burress, E.D., Alda, F. Duarte, A., Loureiro, M., Armbruster, J.W., Chakrabarty, P. 2018. Phylogenomics of the pike cichlids (Cichlidae: Crenicichla) and the rapid evolution and trophic diversification in an incipient species flock. Journal of Evolutionary Biology 31: 14-30 [Cover Article]
- Elias, D.J., Mochel, S.F., Chakrabarty, P., McMahan, C., (2018) First record of the non-native Pacu, Piaractus brachypomus in Lago Peten-Itza, Guatemala, Central America. Occasional Papers of the Museum of Natural Science 88, 1-6.
