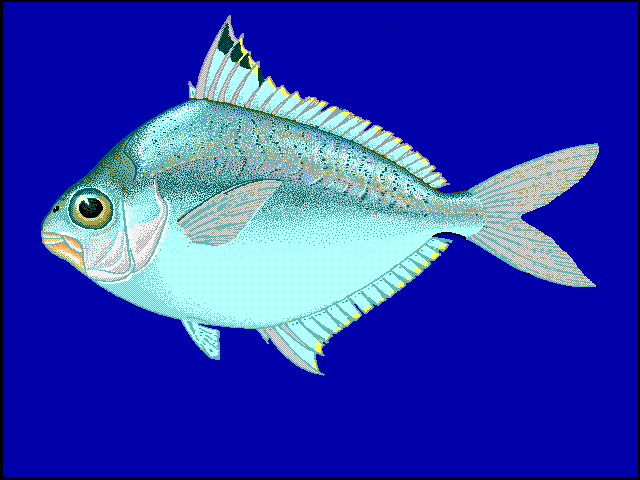
- Eubleekeria splendens

Scientific classification
- Kingdom: Animalia
- Phylum: Chordata
- Class: Actinopterygii
- Division: Teleostei
- Order: Acanthuriformes
- Family: Leiognathidae; T. N. Gill, 1893

Type species
- Leiognathus argenteus Lacépède, 1802

Genera
- See text

= Leiognathidae =

Leiognathidae Temporal range: 56–0 Ma Eocene to Present

Family of ray-finned fishes

Leiognathidae, the ponyfishes, slipmouths or slimys / slimies, are a small family of fishes in the order Acanthuriformes. They inhabit marine and brackish waters in the Indo-Pacific. They can be used in the preparation of bagoong.

== Characteristics ==
Ponyfishes are small and laterally compressed in shape, with silvery colouration. They are distinguished by highly extensible mouths, and the presence of a mechanism for locking the spines in the dorsal and anal fins. They also possess a highly integrated light organ in their throats that houses symbiotic bioluminescent bacteria that project light through the animal's underside. Typically, the harbored bacterium is only Photobacterium leiognathi, but in the two ponyfish species Photopectoralis panayensis and Photopectoralis bindus, Photobacterium mandapamensis is also present. Two of the most widely studied uses for luminescence in ponyfish are camouflage by ventral counterillumination and species-specific sexual dimorphism. The light organ systems of ponyfishes are highly variable across species and often between sexes.

== Taxonomy ==
Leiognathidae was classified within the suborder Percoidei by the 5th edition of Fishes of the World, but it was placed in an unnamed clade outside the superfamily Percoidea. This clade contains seven families which appeared to have some relationship to Acanthuroidei, Monodactylidae, and Priacanthidae. Betancur-Rodriguez et al. (2017) placed the family in the order Chaetodontiformes alongside the family Chaetodontidae. More recent classifications place Leiognathidae and the other aforementioned families in the order Acanthuriformes.

== Genera ==
The following genera are classified within the Leiognathidae, divided between two subfamilies based on Eschmeyer's Catalog of Fishes:

- Subfamily Leiognathinae Gill, 1893
  - Aurigequula Fowler, 1918
  - Leiognathus Lacépède, 1802
- Subfamily Gazzinae Chakrabarty & Sparks, 2015
  - Deveximentum Fowler, 1904 (previously as replacement name Secutor Gistel, 1848)
  - Equulites Fowler, 1904
  - Eubleekeria Fowler, 1904
  - Gazza Rüppell, 1835
  - Karalla Chakrabarty & Sparks, 2008
  - Nuchequula Whitley, 1932
  - Photolateralis Sparks & Chakrabarty, 2015
  - Photopectoralis Sparks, Dunlap & Smith, 2005

The following fossil genera are also known:

- †Eoleiognathus Bannikov, 2014 (Early Eocene of Italy)
- †Euleiognathus Yabumoto & Uyeno, 2011 (Middle Miocene of Japan)
- †Leiognathoides Bannikov, 2001 (Early Oligocene to Early Miocene of Switzerland, Azerbaijan and North Caucasus, Russia)
