= Rhyacichthys guilberti =

Conservation status
- Data Deficient (IUCN 3.1)

Scientific classification
- Kingdom: Animalia
- Phylum: Chordata
- Class: Actinopterygii
- Division: Teleostei
- Order: Gobiiformes
- Family: Rhyacichthyidae
- Genus: Rhyacichthys
- Species: R. guilberti

Binomial name
- Rhyacichthys guilberti Dingerkus & Séret, 1992

Species of fish

Rhyacichthys guilberti, the noreil, is a species of amphidromous ray-finned fish belonging to the family Rhyacichthyidae, the loach gobies. This species is found in Melanesia, in New Caledonia and Vanuatu.

== Taxonomy ==
Rhyacichthys guilberti was first formally described in 1992 by the ichthyologists Guido Dingerkus and Bernard Séret with its type locality given as the Tite River in North Province, New Caledonia. This species is classified in the genus Rhyacichthyswhich was described in 1901 by George Albert Boulenger with Platyptera aspro its type species, Boulenger's name was a replacement name as Platyptera Cuvier, 1829 was preoccuppied by the dipteran Platyptera Meigen, 1803. The genus Rhyacichths is, alongside Protogobius, one of two in the family Rhyacichthyidae. Thacker and Hardman's study of the molecular phylogeny of gobies indicates the loach goby is the most primitive member of the Gobioidei. The family Rhyacichthyidae is included in the suborder Gobioidei in the order Gobiiformes, which also includes the cardinalfishes and sand-divers. In 2022 the genus Rhyacichthys was reviewed and the loach goby (R. aspro) was found to be two species, with the name Rhyacichthys novaeguineae Boulenger, 1903 being resurrected.

== Etymology ==
Rhyacichthys guilberti is classified in the genus Rhyacichthys, this name prefixes the Greek word for "fish", ichthys, with rhyac-, which refers to a "rushing stream" or "mountain torrent", these gobies live in fast flowing streams. The specific name, guilberti, honours the French ichthyologist Eric Guilbert of the Muséum national d’Histoire naturelle (Paris), who assisted in the collection of the holotype.

== Description ==
Rhyacichthys guilberti has 7 spines in the first dorsal fin, the second dorsal fin has a single spine and 8 or 9 soft arys while the anal fin also has a single spine and 8 or 9 soft rays. The first an dsecond dorsal fins are clearly separated. The head is depressed with an inferior mouth which has a fleshy upper lip and the eyes are small. The pelvic fins are set wide apart. The pelvic fons, pectoral fins and the lower part of the head and body create an adhesive disk. There is a well developed lateral line system, the scales along the lateral line are ctenoid. It is a yellowish overall colour, amrked with dark blotches on the sides. The first dorsal fin has a black band close to its base between the spines, there are 3 black bands on the second dorsal fin. The pectoral and pelvic fins are barred and the caudal fin is lunate. The noreil reaches a maximum standard length of 24 cm (9.4 in).

== Distribution and habitat ==
Rhyacichthys guilbertiis endemic to Melanesia where it only occurs in the Northern Province of New Caledonia and in Vanuatu. It is found in only two rivers in New Caledonia. This goby is found in clear, well-oxygenated freshwater rivers and streams, sloping or wide, and is occurs only from the estuary up to the first impassible waterfall, where the current is very strong, i.e. in white water.

== Biology ==
Rhyacichthys guilberti feeds on algae and diatoms on rocks and stones. holding on in the fast current using its broadened pelvic and pectoral fins and its compressed head and snout. This species is an amphidromous fish, the adults spend their whole lives in freshwater but when they spawn the larvae drift downstream to the rivers' mouths and the sea. The larvae spend a 2 to 6 months in the sea before they move into the estuaries and metamorphose, returning to the rivers to settle as adults.

== Conservation status ==
Rhyacichthys guilberti has been assessed by the International Union for Conservation of Nature as Data Deficient because taxonomic status needs clarification. Its population on New Caledonia was estimated at less than 400 individuals, but it is now thought to have been extirpated from that island, it remains common on Vanuatu.
