= Typhleotris mararybe =

Conservation status
- Critically Endangered (IUCN 3.1)

Scientific classification
- Kingdom: Animalia
- Phylum: Chordata
- Class: Actinopterygii
- Order: Gobiiformes
- Family: Milyeringidae
- Genus: Typhleotris
- Species: T. mararybe

Binomial name
- Typhleotris mararybe Sparks & Chakrabarty, 2012

Species of fish

Typhleotris mararybe is a critically endangered species of fish in the family Milyeringidae, the blind cave gobies. It is a troglobitic species endemic to cave habitat in southwestern Madagascar. It is unique among known cave-dwelling fish in that is both blind and darkly pigmented. It has well-developed nonvisual sensory systems and dives to avoid approaching objects. The fish was first collected in 2008 and was described to science as a new species in 2012.

== Description ==
Typhleotris mararybe is about 38 mm (1.5 in) long. The body is uniformly dark brown in color, and the fins are mostly white with brown bases. Its sensory systems include a series of pores on its head, but it lacks eyes.

The fish is relatively slow-moving, but more responsive to approaching objects than the closely related T. madagascariensis, diving to avoid them. It can be distinguished from other members of genus Typhleotris by its dark pigmentation and aspects of its bone structure. T. mararybe is possibly the sister species of T. madagascariensis, as the two share characteristics in common that T. pauliani, the only other member of the genus, does not. T. mararybe may have evolved from an ancestral species that lacked pigmentation and was blind, but that pigmentation was regained for camouflage in parts of the cave that receive sunlight.

== Habitat ==
Typhleotris mararybe is one of four cave-dwelling fishes in Madagascar. It was initially known from only a single cave, a karst sinkhole called the Grotte de Vitane near Itampolo, where two specimens were collected, but has later been discovered to occur in four additional sinkholes/caves in the region. It is overall less widespread and common than T. madagascariensis, which also occurs in the five caves/sinkholes inhabited by T. mararybe. Despite this, direct competition between the two species is not known.

== Taxonomic evaluation ==
Typhleotris mararybe was described from the two specimens, the holotype and the paratype, in 2012. It was published in American Museum Novitates, a journal of the American Museum of Natural History. Locals sometimes enter the Grotte de Vitane cave where it was first discovered, but were unaware of the species.

The specific name was derived from the Malagasy words marary (ill or sick), and be (big), combined to mean "very sick" or "big sickness". It commemorates an unknown severe illness suffered by members of the field team after their snorkeling expedition to survey the sinkhole.
