= Glossogobius matanensis =

Conservation status
- Near Threatened (IUCN 3.1)

Scientific classification
- Kingdom: Animalia
- Phylum: Chordata
- Class: Actinopterygii
- Order: Gobiiformes
- Family: Gobiidae
- Genus: Glossogobius
- Species: G. matanensis

Binomial name
- Glossogobius matanensis (M. C. W. Weber, 1913)

Synonyms
- Gobius matanensis M. C. W. Weber, 1913

Species of fish

Glossogobius matanensis is a species of goby endemic to Sulawesi, Indonesia where it is only known from Lake Matano, Lake Mahalona and Lake Towuti. This species can reach a length of 42 centimetres (17 in) TL.
