= Glossogobius intermedius =

Conservation status
- Near Threatened (IUCN 3.1)

Scientific classification
- Kingdom: Animalia
- Phylum: Chordata
- Class: Actinopterygii
- Order: Gobiiformes
- Family: Gobiidae
- Genus: Glossogobius
- Species: G. intermedius

Binomial name
- Glossogobius intermedius Aurich, 1938

Species of fish

Glossogobius intermedius is a species of goby endemic to Sulawesi, Indonesia where it is only known to occur in Lake Towuti and Lake Mahalona. This species can reach a length of 14 centimetres (5.5 in) SL.
