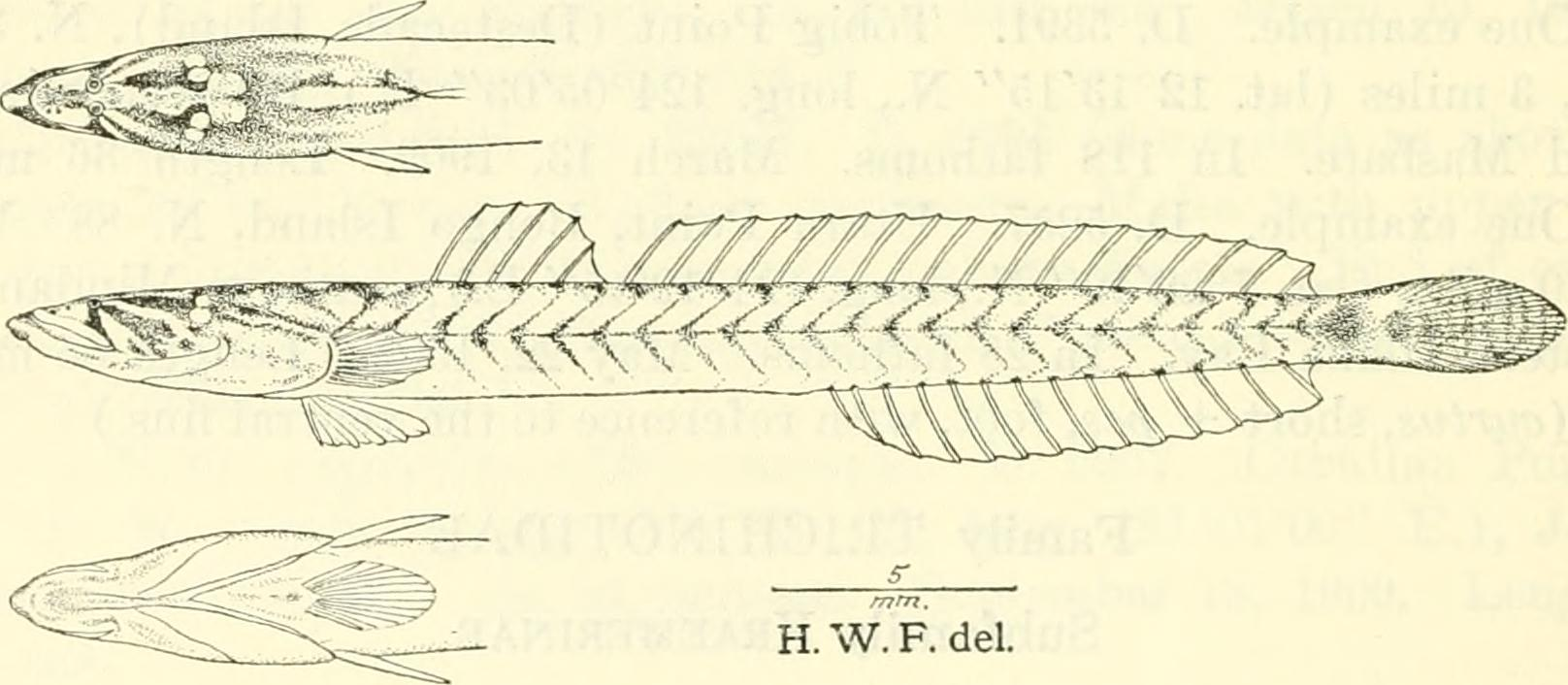

Conservation status
- Least Concern (IUCN 3.1)

Scientific classification
- Kingdom: Animalia
- Phylum: Chordata
- Class: Actinopterygii
- Order: Gobiiformes
- Family: Gobiidae
- Genus: Gobitrichinotus
- Species: G. radiocularis

Binomial name
- Gobitrichinotus radiocularis Fowler, 1943

= Gobitrichinotus radiocularis =

Species of fish

Gobitrichinotus radiocularis is a species of goby which is found in the Indian and Pacific oceans, including the Ryukyu Islands in Japan, Philippines, the Solomon Islands, French Polynesia, and Vanuatu.

== Description ==
This species of goby can reach a length of 4 centimetres (1.6 in) TL. The caudal fin is rounded. It has 5 dorsal spines, between 18 and 19 dorsal soft rays, 1 anal spine, and 14 anal soft rays.

== Habitat ==
Gobitrichinotus radiocularis inhabits salt, brackish, and fresh waters. It lives in shallow areas with substrates of fine coral sand or muddy sand, in which it burrows. It has been recorded at depths between 2–25 metres (79–984 in).
