= Gobitrichinotus arnoulti =

Conservation status
- Least Concern (IUCN 3.1)

Scientific classification
- Kingdom: Animalia
- Phylum: Chordata
- Class: Actinopterygii
- Order: Gobiiformes
- Family: Gobiidae
- Genus: Gobitrichinotus
- Species: G. arnoulti

Binomial name
- Gobitrichinotus arnoulti Kiener, 1963

Species of fish

Gobitrichinotus arnoulti is a species of sand darter endemic to Madagascar where it occurs in fresh waters. This species can reach a length of 4 centimetres (1.6 in) TL.
