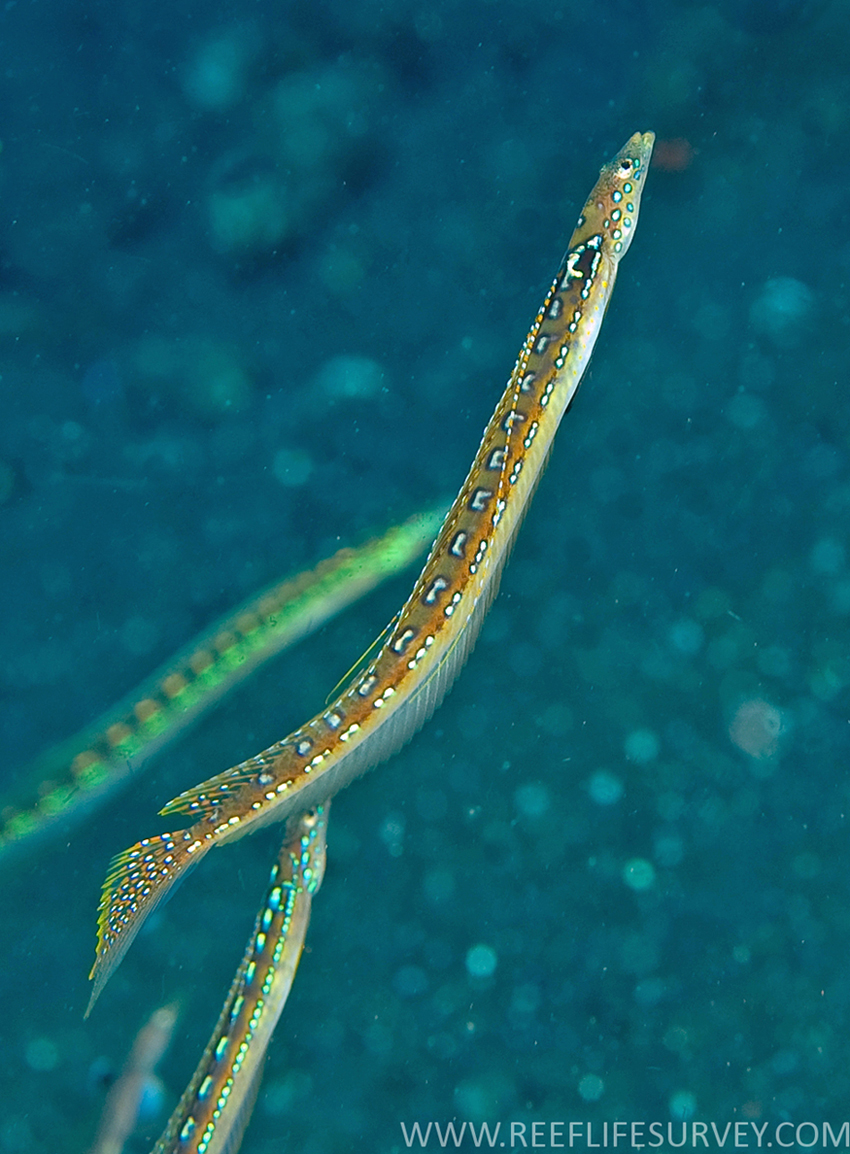

Conservation status
- Least Concern (IUCN 3.1)

Scientific classification
- Kingdom: Animalia
- Phylum: Chordata
- Class: Actinopterygii
- Division: Teleostei
- Order: Gobiiformes
- Family: Trichonotidae
- Genus: Trichonotus
- Species: T. elegans

Binomial name
- Trichonotus elegans Shimada & Yoshino, 1984

= Trichonotus elegans =

Species of fish

Trichonotus elegans, the elegant sand-diver, long-rayed sand-diver or threadfin sand-diver, is a species of marine ray-finned fish belonging to the family Trichonotidae, the sand-divers. It is found through much of the Indo-West Pacific.

== Taxonomy ==
Trichonotus elegans was first formally described in 1984 by the Japanese ichthyologists Kenshi shimada and Tetsuo Yoshino with its type locality given as south-southeast of Hatoma Island, Yaeyama Islands, Okinawa Prefecture, Japan, at 24°28'N, 123°49'E, from a depth of about 20 m (66 ft). This fish is classified in the genus Trichonotus which was described in 1801 by Marcus Elieser Bloch and Johann Gottlob Theaenus Schneider when they described T. setiger, its type species by monotypy. Trichonotus is the only genus in the monotypic family Trichonotidae. Trichonotidae is the only family in the monotypic suborder Trichonotoidei within the order Gobiiformes, which also contains the cardinalfishes and gobies.

== Etymology ==
Trichonotus elegans is classified in the genus Trichonotus, this name puts trichos, meaning "hair", in front of notus meaning "back", an allusion to the filamentous dorsal fin spines of males of the type species of the genus. The specific name, elegans, is Latin for "elegant", an allusion to the elegant shape of this fish and its undulating swimming action.

== Description ==
Trichonotus elegans has an elongated body and it reaches a maximum standard length of 18 cm (7.1 in). There are 3 spines and between 43 and 45 soft rays in the dorsal fin while there is a single spine and between 39 and 42 soft rays in the anal fin. The head and front part of the body have no scales. The males have greatly elongated, filamentous dorsal fin spines, taller dorsal fin rays and a pointed caudal fin, this is rounded in females.

== Distribution and habitat ==
Trichonotus elegans is found in the Indian and Pacific Oceans, from the Maldives and the Chagos Archipelago, the Andaman Sea east into the Pacific as far as east as Fiji, north to the Ryukyu Islands of southern Japan, south to the Coral Sea. In Australia this species is occurs at the Ashmore Reef in the Timor Sea, Lizard Island on the Great Barrier Reef and Bramble Reef in the Coral Sea. The elegant sand-diver is found on sand rubble substrates on outer reef slopes and current channels in outer reef lagoons.

== Behaviour ==
Trichonotus elegans is typically encountered in large groups with several large males present. Elegant sand-divers usually form harems consisting of one male and about a dozen females. Species in the genus Trichonotus are protogynous hermaphrodites. These fishes normally stay buried in the sand when no current is running. When threatened these fishes dive into the sand.
