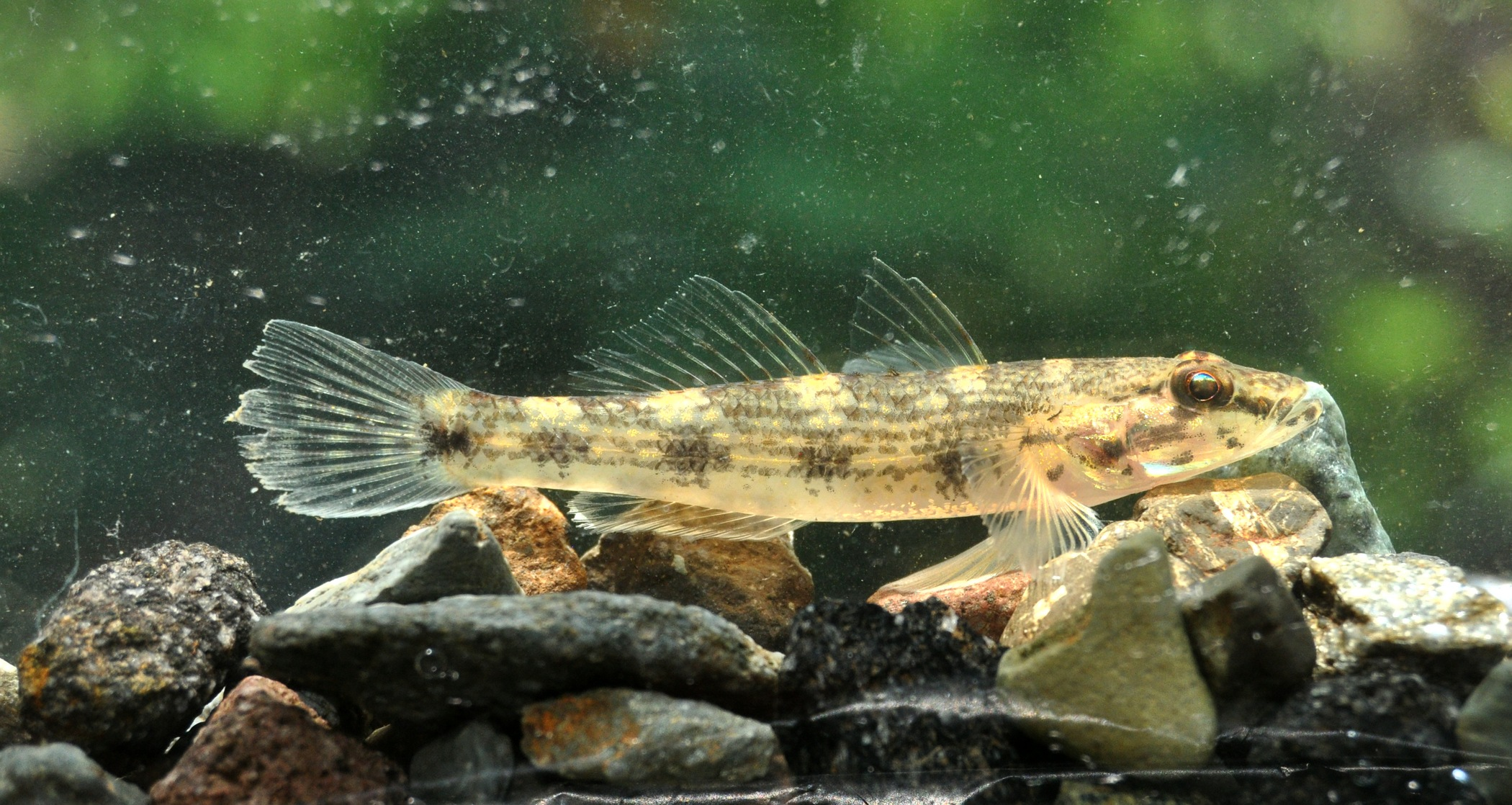

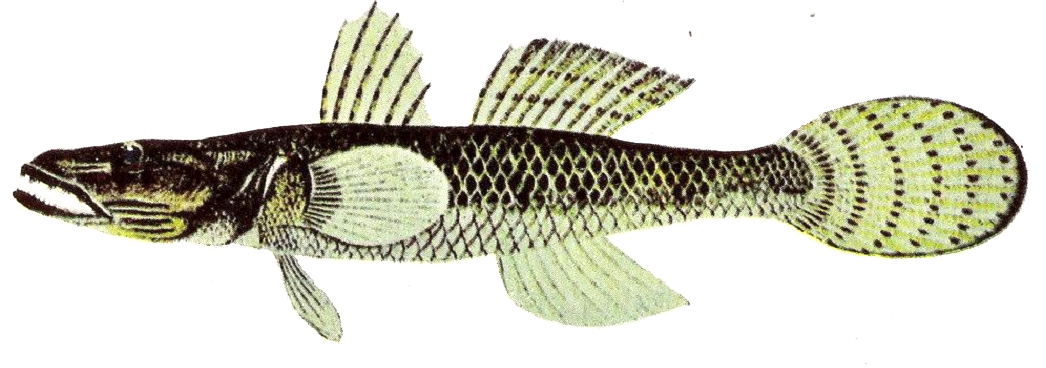

Conservation status
- Least Concern (IUCN 3.1)

Scientific classification
- Kingdom: Animalia
- Phylum: Chordata
- Class: Actinopterygii
- Order: Gobiiformes
- Family: Gobiidae
- Genus: Glossogobius
- Species: G. giuris

Binomial name
- Glossogobius giuris (F. Hamilton, 1822)

Synonyms
- Gobius giuris F. Hamilton, 1822; Acentrogobius giuris (F. Hamilton, 1822); Glossogobius giuris giuris (F. Hamilton, 1822); Gobius gutum F. Hamilton, 1822; Awaous gutum (F. Hamilton, 1822); Gobius russelli Cuvier, 1829; Gobius catebus Valenciennes, 1837; Gobius kora Valenciennes, 1837; Gobius kurpah Sykes, 1839; Gobius phaiospilosoma Bleeker, 1849; Gobius sublitus Cantor, 1849; Gobius spectabilis Günther, 1861; Euctenogobius striatus F. Day, 1868; Gobius striatus (F. Day, 1868); Gobius grandidieri Playfair, 1868; Glossogobius tenuiformis Fowler, 1934

= Tank goby =

Species of fish

Glossogobius giuris, the tank goby, is a species of goby native to fresh, marine and brackish waters from the Red Sea and East Africa through South Asia and the Indian Ocean to China, Australia and the islands of the Pacific Ocean. This species can also be found in the aquarium trade. It is also known as the bar-eyed goby, flat-headed goby and the Gangetic tank goby.

== Description ==
The head is depressed with a protruding lower jaw while the body takes on a compressed appearance towards to caudal fin. Normally brown or light brown with various darker brown spots and flecks along the sides. Ranges in size from 40 to 50 cm maximum (16–20 inches).

== Habitat ==
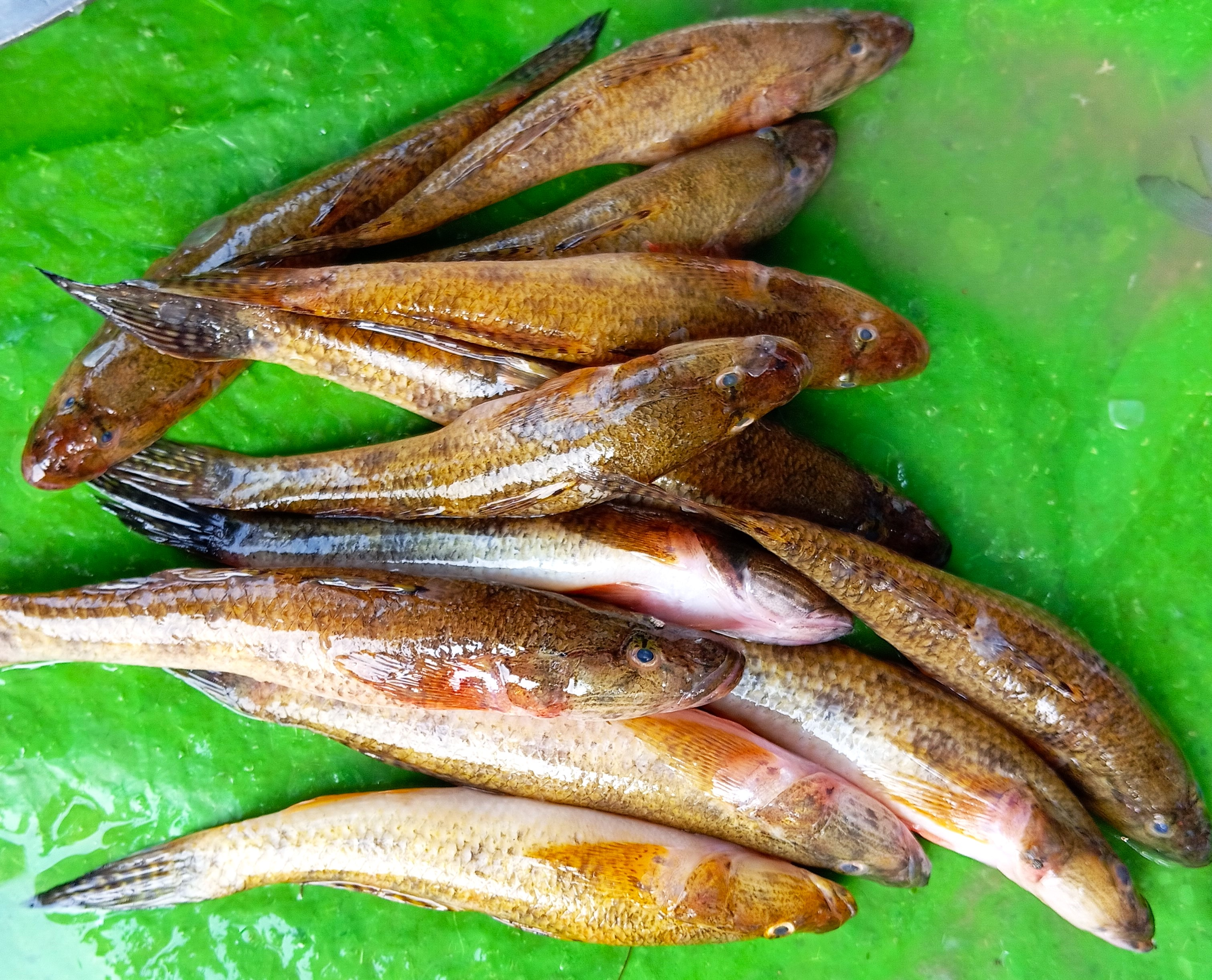
Gangetic tank goby, West Bengal, India

This subtropical species is most often associated with estuarine habitats, although it is also found in marine water and can be found many kilometers inland in freshwater streams, up to 300 kilometres (190 miles) inland in Malawi. This species is a benthopelagic and amphidromous goby which is found in clear to turbid streams with rock, gravel, or sandy substrates.

== Reproduction ==
Lays eggs amongst submerged vegetation, where the eggs are guarded by both the male and the female. They will spawn in freshwater, the eggs being taken to the sea by the current, although it can complete its whole life cycle in freshwater. In South Africa it breeds in the summer while in northern Australia breeding takes place in the dry season.

== Feeding ==
A carnivorous fish, it will eat any small fish and invertebrates it comes across. Cannibalism has been recorded. According to the index of abundance the preferred food items in guts were recorded as; fish (44.75%), semi digested food (22.46%), insect (12%), debris & detritus (6.78%), crustacean (5.93%), fish scale (4.76%), fish egg (1.53%), zooplankton (0.83%), plant (0.63%) and mollusk (0.33%) by volume. The ratio of total length (TL) and total gut length (TGL) was 1:0.252. Gut length was about less than half of the total length of the fish, which also indicated the carnivorous nature of feeding habit of the fish.

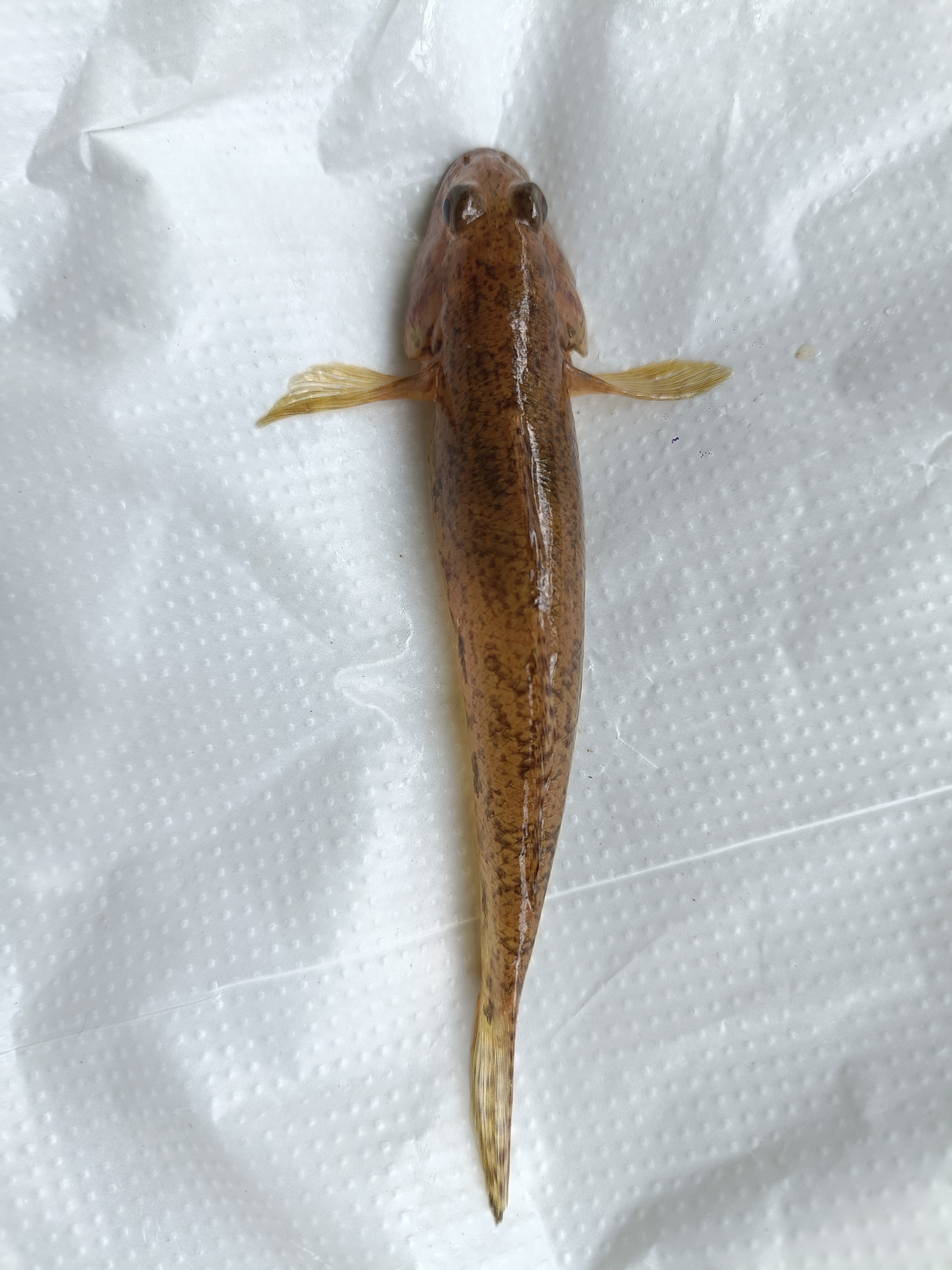
Poolan fish (tank goby) from Chalakkudy river, Kerala-India

== Human interaction ==
Unusually for a goby this species is commercially exploited, possibly due to its large size, and sold fresh or frozen. It also appears in the aquarium trade.
