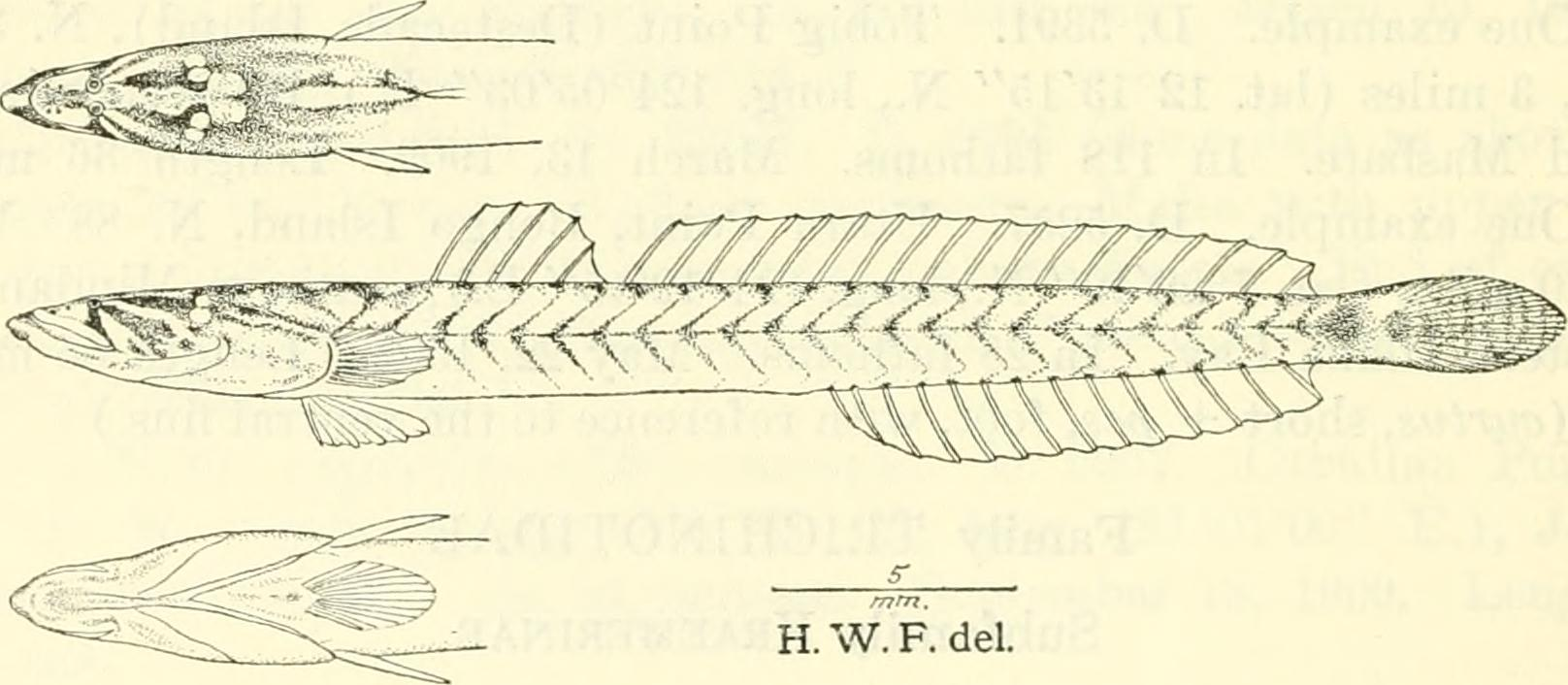
- Gobitrichinotus radiocularis

Scientific classification
- Kingdom: Animalia
- Phylum: Chordata
- Class: Actinopterygii
- Order: Gobiiformes
- Family: Gobiidae
- Genus: Gobitrichinotus; Fowler, 1943

Type species
- Gobitrichinotus radiocularis Fowler, 1943

= Gobitrichinotus =

Genus of fishes

Gobitrichinotus is a genus of sand darters, with one species from rivers in Madagascar and another from coastal waters (salt, brackish and fresh) of the western Pacific Ocean.

== Species ==
There are currently two recognized species in this genus:

- Gobitrichinotus arnoulti Kiener, 1963
- Gobitrichinotus radiocularis Fowler, 1943
