= Glossogobius ankaranensis =

Conservation status
- Least Concern (IUCN 3.1)

Scientific classification
- Kingdom: Animalia
- Phylum: Chordata
- Class: Actinopterygii
- Order: Gobiiformes
- Family: Gobiidae
- Genus: Glossogobius
- Species: G. ankaranensis

Binomial name
- Glossogobius ankaranensis Banister, 1994

Species of fish

Glossogobius ankaranensis is a species of fish in the family Gobiidae. This cavefish is endemic to the Ankarana Reserve in Madagascar. Its natural habitat is inland karsts.

== Cave system ==
The Ankarana Mountain Range, formed by middle Jurassic sedimentary rock, is located in northern Madagascar, and its highest mountain is about 300 m (980 ft) above sea level. Several trees grow in the mountains' canyons and downfallen caves. Evergreen trees especially have an advantage due to the waters from a system of rivers that flows through the caves. Two important rivers enter the mountain range, the Andranotsisiloha and the Besaboba. These rivers are perennial and provide essential nutrients and habitat for an immense amount of organisms such as G. ankaranensis. This species was found in the Second River Cave. The only approachable section of the Second Cave River is 150 m (490 ft) long and the deepest point is 2 m (6.6 ft) with a width of 5 m (16 ft). The water temperature benefits all organisms it houses because it oscillates around 21 °C (70 °F).

== Biology ==
Several physical characteristics distinguish this species from others that live in the region. The lack of pigmentation causes this fish to look pink in color; its blood and internal organs are visible through the scales. Several rows of teeth are accommodated by a big mouth and thick lips. Another factor that helps accommodate the quantity of teeth is the fact that the lower jaws protrude further than the upper jaws. G. ankaranensis is not light sensitive because little to no sunlight reaches the waters in which this species lives. The lengths of these fish typically vary from about 4 to 7 cm (1.6–2.8 in), and they move around slowly with their mouths closed.

=== Nutrition ===
Food is very abundant in these caves, which apparently keeps the population of these fishes stable. Some of the species that serve as food for G. ankaranensis are shrimps, insects, and wastes from other animals and the environment.

== Discovery ==
The discovery of G. ankaranensis was purely accidental. Two trips were performed by several scientists to the Ankarana Mountain Range. The first trip was in 1981 and its mission was to explore the wild life of the Ankarana mountains and rivers. During this trip, several new species of cave-adapted shrimps stood out to scientists and they decided to come back again. In 1986, much more attention was devoted to cave-adapted species. The new species G. ankaranensis, a white and blind fish, was found in the Second River Cave.

== Eyes ==
These fish are blind; no ocular tissue is found in their eye sockets except for a little black spot in each of the eyes. An increase in predation when G. ankaranensis is exposed to UV light might be due to the lack of eyes and pigments. Pigments are necessary when G. ankaranensis is exposed to UV light because they deflect UV light.

== Neuromasts ==
Neuromasts (sensory papillae or pit organs) are interesting adaptations that this species of fish have developed to deal with reduced vision. These structures are not clustered in only one section of the individual's body but widely distributed. Six rows of neuromasts are located on the cheeks as well as the trunk of Glossogobius. Other rows of neuromasts can be found on the dorsolateral and ventrolateral series. G. ankaranensis dark-adapted lifestyle can be supported by the widespread presence of neuromasts along the species body.

== Conservation status ==
Despite its small range, G. ankaranensis is not considered threatened, as it lives entirely within the Ankarana Reserve in an isolated region that is not subjected to human changes (in part because of a local fady) and its population is relatively stable. Annual floods can be important because much food can be derived from them, but floods can drastically diminish the fish population living in the caves of the Ankarana Reserve. Though G. ankaranensis is generally dispersed among the caves of the Ankarana Mountain Range, the mountain range is very small (28 X 8 km at its widest region).

== See also ==
- Typhleotris, another cave fish genus from Madagascar
