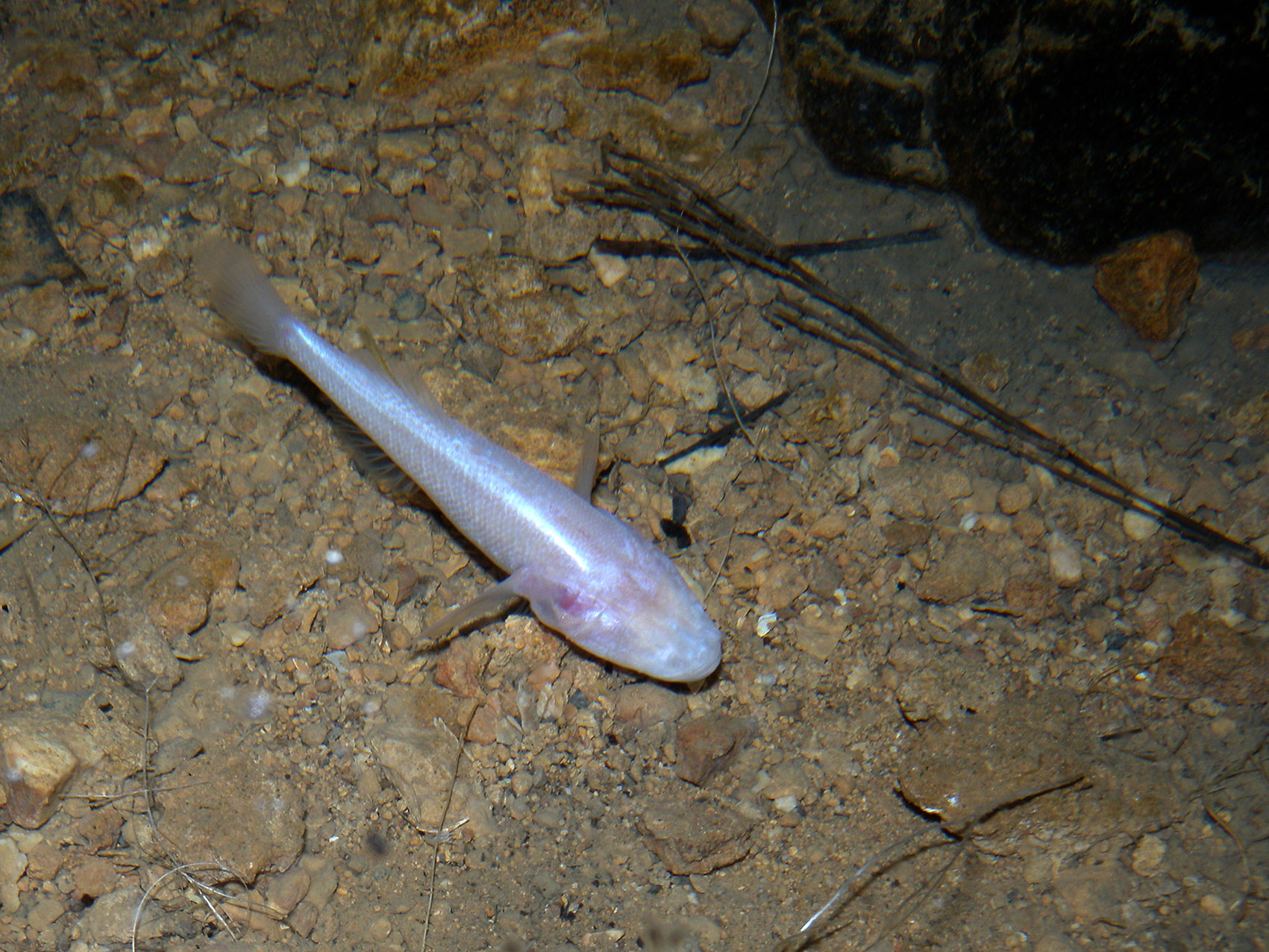
- Typhleotris madgascarensis

Scientific classification
- Domain: Eukaryota
- Kingdom: Animalia
- Phylum: Chordata
- Class: Actinopterygii
- Order: Gobiiformes
- Family: Milyeringidae
- Genus: Typhleotris; Petit, 1933

Type species
- Typhleotris madagascariensis Petit, 1933

= Typhleotris =

Genus of fishes

Typhleotris is a genus of cavefish that are endemic to caves in southwestern Madagascar. Although traditionally considered to belong to the family Eleotridae, studies show that they represent a distinct and far-separated lineage together with the Milyeringa cavefish from Australia, leading some to move them to their own family, Milyeringidae.

== Species ==
The recognized species in this genus are:

- Typhleotris madagascariensis Petit, 1933
- Typhleotris mararybe Sparks and Chakrabarty, 2012
- Typhleotris pauliani Arnoult, 1959

== See also ==
- Glossogobius ankaranensis, another cave fish species from Madagascar
