= Typhleotris pauliani =

Conservation status
- Critically Endangered (IUCN 3.1)

Scientific classification
- Kingdom: Animalia
- Phylum: Chordata
- Class: Actinopterygii
- Order: Gobiiformes
- Family: Milyeringidae
- Genus: Typhleotris
- Species: T. pauliani

Binomial name
- Typhleotris pauliani Arnoult, 1959

Species of fish

Typhleotris pauliani is a critically endangered species of fish in the family Milyeringidae that is endemic to Madagascar, where it is only known from a few caves and sinkholes in the southwestern portion of the island. This blind cavefish lacks pigmentation and can reach a standard length of 7.1 cm (2.8 in). It feeds on invertebrates and guano. Part of its range receive some protection, but the species is threatened by disturbance from recreational activities (from tourists and locals) and collectors of guano. The specific name honours the French entomologist and former deputy director of the Institut de recherche pour le développement in Madagascar, Renaud Paulian (1913-2003), who collected the type specimens as well as contributing a lot to the knowledge of the biogeography of the western Indian Ocean.
