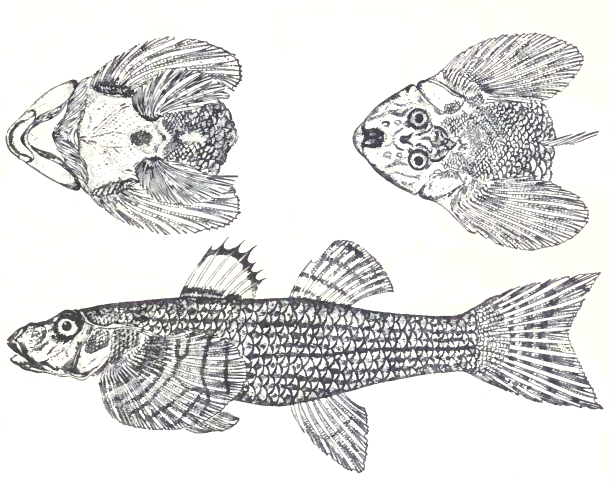

Scientific classification
- Kingdom: Animalia
- Phylum: Chordata
- Class: Actinopterygii
- Division: Teleostei
- Order: Gobiiformes
- Family: Rhyacichthyidae
- Genus: Rhyacichthys; Boulenger, 1901

Type species
- Platyptera aspro Valenciennes, 1837

= Rhyacichthys =

Genus of fishes

Rhyacichthys is a genus of fish belonging to the family Rhyacichthyidae. They occur in the Indo-Pacific region.

== Species ==
- Rhyacichthys aspro (Valenciennes, 1837) - loach goby
- Rhyacichthys guilberti (Dingerkus & Séret, 1992)
- Rhyacichthys novaeguineae Boulenger, 1903
