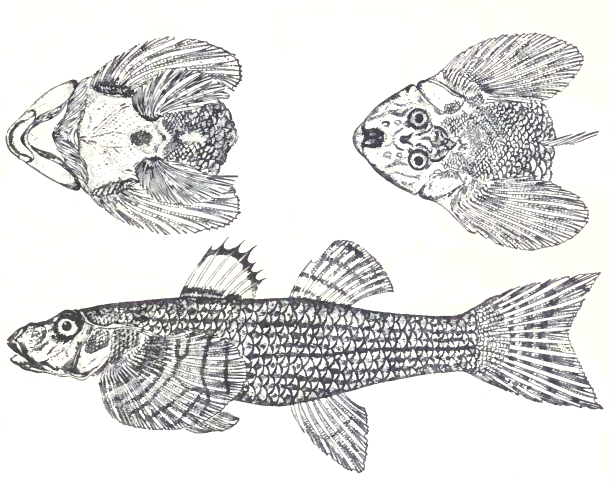

Conservation status
- Data Deficient (IUCN 3.1)

Scientific classification
- Kingdom: Animalia
- Phylum: Chordata
- Class: Actinopterygii
- Division: Teleostei
- Order: Gobiiformes
- Family: Rhyacichthyidae
- Genus: Rhyacichthys
- Species: R. aspro

Binomial name
- Rhyacichthys aspro (Valenciennes, 1837)

Synonyms
- Platyptera aspro Valenciennes, 1837; Platypterus flavescens Valenciennes, 1842; Platypterus flavipinnis Roberts, 1993

= Loach goby =

Species of fish

The loach goby, (Rhyacichthys aspro), is a species of amphidromous ray-finned fish belonging to the family Rhyacichthyidae, the loach gobies. This species is found in southeast Asia.

== Taxonomy ==
The loach goby was first formally described as Platyptera aspro in 1837 by the French zoologist Achille Valenciennes in Volume 12 of the Histoire naturelle des poissons with its type locality given as Banten, Western Java, and Sulawesi in Indonesia. This is one of the three species classified under the genus Rhyacichthys in the family Rhyacichthyidae. The genus Rhyacichthys was described in 1901 by George Albert Boulenger with Platyptera aspro its type species, Boulenger's name was a replacement name as Platyptera Cuvier, 1829 was preoccuppied by the dipteran Platyptera Meigen, 1803. The genus Rhyacichths is, alongside Protogobius, one of two in the family Rhyacichthyidae. Thacker and Hardman's study of the molecular phylogeny of gobies indicates the loach goby is the most primitive member of the Gobioidei. The family Rhyacichthyidae is included in the suborder Gobioidei in the order Gobiiformes, which also includes the cardinalfishes and sand-divers. In 2022 the genus Rhyacichthys was reviewed and the loach goby was found to be two species, with the name Rhyacichthys novaeguineae Boulenger, 1903 being resurrected.

== Etymology ==
The loach goby is the type species of the genus Rhyacichthys, this name prefixes the Greek word for "fish", ichthys, with rhyac-, which refers to a "rushing stream" or "mountain torrent", these gobies live in fast flowing streams. The specific name, aspro, is thought to refer to this species superficial similarity to the Rhone streber (Zingel asper) of Europe.

== Description ==
The loach goby is 25–32 centimetres (9.8–12.6 in) long. It has eight dorsal spines, eight or 9 soft dorsal rays, one anal spine, and eight or 9 anal rays. The head is flattened vertically, with a snout and small eyes. The mouth is on the underside and has a fleshy upper lip. The body is laterally compressed toward the slightly forked tail; it has a well-developed lateral line system. The pelvic fins are separate, with enlarged musculature. In colour, it is light brown, with darker, longitudinal stripes on its flanks. Also, dark stripes occur on the dorsal, caudal, and pectoral fins.

== Distribution and habitat ==
The loach goby lives in tropical waters, ranging from China and south Japan, through the Philippines and Java and Sulawesi in Indonesia. It inhabits fast-flowing streams in mountainous terrain.

== Habits ==
The loach goby normally clings to rocks in fast-flowing streams, using the rocks as hiding places when threatened. It makes swift darting movements. It eats the algae growing on the rock surfaces. The loach gobies are amphidromous fishes, the adults spend their whole lives in freshwater but when they spawn the larvae drift downstream to the rivers' mouths and the sea. The larvae spend a 2 to 6 months in the sea before they move into the estuaries and metamorphose, returning to the rivers to settle as adults.
