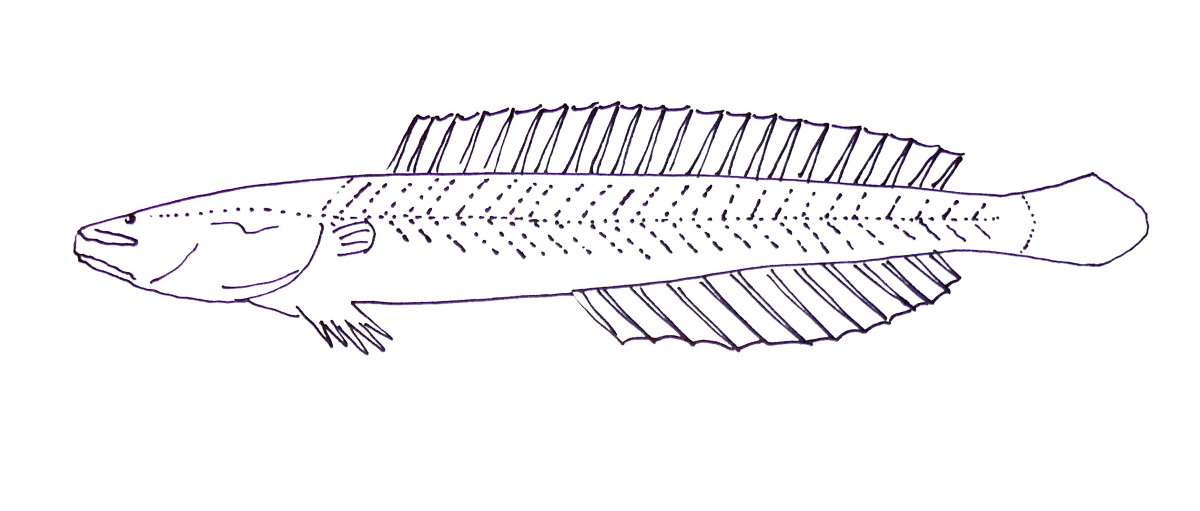
- Kraemeria samoensis

Scientific classification
- Kingdom: Animalia
- Phylum: Chordata
- Class: Actinopterygii
- Order: Gobiiformes
- Family: Gobiidae
- Genus: Kraemeria; Steindachner, 1906

Type species
- Kraemeria samoensis Steindachner, 1906

Synonyms
- Psammichthys Regan, 1908; Vitreola D. S. Jordan & Seale, 1906

= Kraemeria =

Genus of fishes

Kraemeria is a genus of goby, formerly the type genus of the family Kraemeriidae, but now classified in the Gobiidae. The species in this genus are native to the Indian and Pacific oceans.

== Species ==
There are currently seven recognized species in this genus:

- Kraemeria bryani L. P. Schultz, 1941 (Bryan's sand dart)
- Kraemeria cunicularia Rofen, 1958 (Transparent sand dart)
- Kraemeria galatheaensis Rofen, 1958 (Galathea sand dart)
- Kraemeria merensis Whitley, 1935
- Kraemeria nuda (Regan, 1908)
- Kraemeria samoensis Steindachner, 1906 (Samoan sand dart)
- Kraemeria tongaensis Rofen, 1958
