= Trichonotus arabicus =

Scientific classification
- Kingdom: Animalia
- Phylum: Chordata
- Class: Actinopterygii
- Order: Gobiiformes
- Family: Trichonotidae
- Genus: Trichonotus
- Species: T. arabicus

Binomial name
- Trichonotus arabicus Randall & Tarr, 1994

Species of fish

Trichonotus arabicus, the Arabian sand diver, is a shallow-water, marine perciform fish in the family Trichonotidae. It is native to the western Indian Ocean, the Gulf of Oman and the Persian Gulf.

== Description ==
The Arabian sand diver is a somewhat compressed, elongated fish growing to a maximum length of about 14.5 cm (6 in). The head is pointed with a slightly oblique mouth and a projecting lower jaw. A fringe of papillae can be seen along the lip when the mouth is closed. The eyes are small and are set close together near the top of the head. The dorsal fin has 3 to 4 spines of nearly equal length, and 44 to 47 soft rays. The anal fin has a single spine and 36 to 39 soft rays. The dorsal and anal fins bear a row of small yellow spots. The caudal fin is rounded. Males are generally larger than females and have a longitudinal row of about fourteen brown blotches running along the body, and three rows of very small pale blue spots with dark edges. Females have an indistinct dark line running just above the lateral line.

== Distribution ==
The Arabian sand diver is endemic to the western Indian Ocean, the Gulf of Oman and the Persian Gulf. It is a demersal fish found close to the sandy seabed at depths of up to 2 m (6 ft 7 in).

== Behaviour ==
The Arabian sand diver is found in small groups feeding on zooplankton just above the seabed. When alarmed, the fishes dive into the sand and remains stationary with just the upper parts of their head protruding from the sediment. If further disturbed, they erupt from the sand and swim a short distance before submerging themselves again. Males have a harem of females. Courtship includes the erection of the dorsal fin and the lowering of the pelvic and anal fins.
