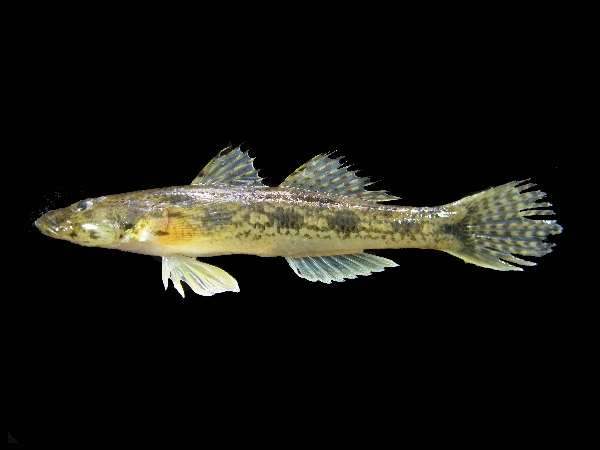
- Glossogobius giuris

Scientific classification
- Kingdom: Animalia
- Phylum: Chordata
- Class: Actinopterygii
- Division: Teleostei
- Order: Gobiiformes
- Family: Gobiidae
- Genus: Glossogobius; T. N. Gill, 1859

Type species
- Gobius platycephalus as a synonym of Glossogobius giuris J. Richardson, 1846

Synonyms
- Aloricatogobius Munro, 1964; Cephalogobius Bleeker, 1874; Illana H.M. Smith & Seale, 1906; Stupidogobius Aurich, 1938

= Glossogobius =

Genus of fishes

Glossogobius is a genus of gobies native to fresh, brackish and marine waters from Africa to the coasts of the western Pacific Ocean. They are found in Madagascar, South Africa, Japan, Thailand, Australia, Indonesia, Bangladesh, the Philippines, Taiwan, Papua New Guinea, Singapore, Malawi, Eswatini, Botswana, Kenya, Zimbabwe, Tanzania, Mozambique, the Solomon Islands, Palau, Fiji, New Caledonia, India, Laos, Sri Lanka, Myanmar, Borneo, Nepal, Brunei Darussalam, Micronesia, Cambodia, Vietnam, China, Réunion, the Seychelles, Mauritius, the Caroline Islands, Vanuatu, Malaysia and Russia. The genus also includes a troglobitic species, G. ankaranensis.

== Species ==
There are currently 32 recognized species in this genus:

- Glossogobius ankaranensis Banister, 1994
- Glossogobius aureus Akihito & Meguro, 1975 (Golden tank goby)
- Glossogobius bellendenensis Hoese & G. R. Allen, 2009
- Glossogobius bicirrhosus M. C. W. Weber, 1894
- Glossogobius brunnoides Nichols, 1951 (Dusky mountain goby)
- Glossogobius bulmeri Whitley, 1959 (Bulmer's goby)
- Glossogobius callidus J. L. B. Smith, 1937
- Glossogobius celebius Valenciennes, 1837 (Celebes goby)
- Glossogobius circumspectus W. J. Macleay, 1883 (Circumspect goby)
- Glossogobius clitellus Hoese & G. R. Allen, 2012
- Glossogobius coatesi Hoese & G. R. Allen, 1990 (Coates' goby)
- Glossogobius concavifrons E. P. Ramsay & J. D. Ogilby, 1886 (Concave goby)
- Glossogobius flavipinnis Aurich, 1938 (Towuti yellowfin goby)
- Glossogobius giuris F. Hamilton, 1822 (Tank goby)
- Glossogobius gnomus Hoese, G. R. Allen & Hadiaty, 2017
- Glossogobius hoesei G. R. Allen & Boeseman, 1982 (Hoese's goby)
- Glossogobius illimis Hoese & G. R. Allen, 2012 (False Celebius goby)
- Glossogobius intermedius Aurich, 1938
- Glossogobius kokius Valenciennes, 1837
- Glossogobius koragensis Herre, 1935 (Koragu tank goby)
- Glossogobius macrocephalus Hoese & G. R. Allen, 2015
- Glossogobius mahalonensis Hoese, Hadiaty & Herder, 2015 (Mahalona bluefin goby)
- Glossogobius matanensis M. C. W. Weber, 1913
- Glossogobius minutus C. Geevarghese & P. A. John, 1983
- Glossogobius multipapillus Hoese & G. R. Allen, 2015
- Glossogobius munroi Hoese & G. R. Allen, 2012
- Glossogobius muscorum Hoese & G. R. Allen, 2009
- Glossogobius nanus Hoese, G. R. Allen & Hadiaty, 2017
- Glossogobius obscuripinnis W. K. H. Peters, 1868
- Glossogobius olivaceus Temminck & Schlegel, 1845
- Glossogobius pumilus Hoese, G. R. Allen & Hadiaty, 2017
- Glossogobius robertsi Hoese & G. R. Allen, 2009
- Glossogobius sentaniensis Hoese & G. R. Allen, 2015
- Glossogobius sparsipapillus Akihito & Meguro, 1976 (Linecheek tank goby)
- Glossogobius torrentis Hoese & G. R. Allen, 1990 (White water goby)
