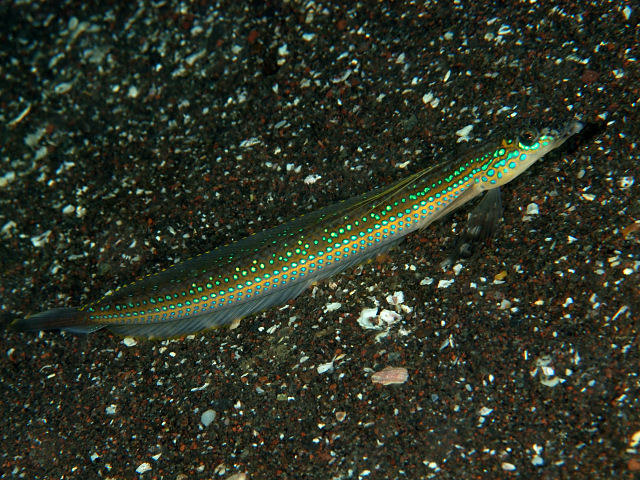

Conservation status
- Least Concern (IUCN 3.1)

Scientific classification
- Kingdom: Animalia
- Phylum: Chordata
- Class: Actinopterygii
- Division: Teleostei
- Order: Gobiiformes
- Family: Trichonotidae
- Genus: Trichonotus
- Species: T. setiger

Binomial name
- Trichonotus setiger Bloch & J. G. Schneider, 1801

Synonyms
- Trichonotus polyophthalmus Bleeker, 1854

= Spotted sand-diver =

Species of fish

The spotted sand-diver (Trichonotus setiger) is a species of marine ray-finned fish belonging to the family Trichonotidae, the sand-divers. It is found through much of the Indo-West Pacific.

== Taxonomy ==
The spotted sand-diver was first formally described in 1801 by the German naturalists Marcus Elieser Bloch and Johann Gottlob Schneider with its type locality given as "India orientali", which means either Indonesia or Nagasaki Prefecture, Kyushu in Japan. When Bloch and Schneider described this species they also named the genus Trichonotus with T. setiger being its type species by monotypy. Trichonotus is the only genus in the monotypic family Trichonotidae. Trichonotidae is the only family in the monotypic suborder Trichonotoidei within the order Gobiiformes, which also contains the cardinalfishes and gobies.

== Etymology ==
The spooted sand-diver is the type species of the genus Trichonotus, this name puts trichos, meaning "hair", in front of notus meaning "back", an allusion to the filamentous dorsal fin spines of males of the type species of the genus. The specific name, setiger, means to "bear hair or bristles", thought to be an allusion to the greatly elongated, filamentous dorsal fin spines in males.

== Description ==
Spotted sand-divers reach a maximum length of 22 cm (8.7 in). They have 39 to 41 soft dorsal rayss. Males can be distinguished from females by their long dorsal fin rays and larger size. This species has an elongated body shape and it reaches a maximum total length of 22 cm (8.7 in).

== Distribution ==
The spotted sand-diver has a wide Indo-Pacific range and it can be found from the Persian Gulf to Queensland and Melanesia

== Habits ==
Spotted sand-divers occur in large groups where there are steep sand slopes. They hover above clean sandy substrates and dive into the sand when disturbed. The habitat usually contains some silt. They are normally observed resting on sea bed, leaving substrate to catch zooplankton, or to display. Some species in the genus Trichonotus are protogynous hermaphrodites.
