= Protogobius =

Conservation status
- Endangered (IUCN 3.1)

Scientific classification
- Kingdom: Animalia
- Phylum: Chordata
- Class: Actinopterygii
- Division: Teleostei
- Order: Gobiiformes
- Family: Rhyacichthyidae
- Genus: Protogobius; Watson & Pöllabauer, 1998
- Species: P. attiti

Binomial name
- Protogobius attiti Watson & Pöllabauer, 1998

Genus of fishes

Protogobius is a monospecific genus of amphidromous ray-finned fish belonging to the family Rhyacichthyidae, the loach gobies. The only species in the genus is Protogobius attiti which is endemic to New Caledonia.

== Taxonomy ==
Protogobius was first formally described in 1998 by the biologists Ronald E. Watson and Christine Pöllabauer when they described P. attiti, with its type locality given as Port Boisé, Trou Bleu River, southeastern South Province, New Caledonia. P. attiti is the type species of Propogobius by monotypy. Protogobius is one of two genera in the family Rhyacichthyidae, the loach gobies, which is included in the suborder Gobioidei in the order Gobiiformes, which also includes the cardinalfishes and sand-divers.

== Etymology ==
Protogobius prefixes gobius, meaning a "little valued fish" or a "gudgeon", with proto-, meaning "first". Watson and Pöllabauer did not explain this name but it is probably a reference to the basal position of this taxon within the Gobioidei, as shown by it possession of some plesiomorphic characters. The specific name, attiti, honours the Chief Attiti, one of the Melanesian tribal chiefs of Goro, who quickly recognised the new goby, but said that there was no name for it among his people.

== Description ==
Protogobius has an elongated body and it reaches a maximum standard length of 8 cm (3.1 in). The first dorsal fin has 7 spines, the second dorsal fin has a single spine and 8 soft rays, Both sexes have several rows of red spots along the middle of the back. In males with distal half of the first dorsal fin is red and they have 6 to 8 black bars on the body. The females have a large black spot on the first dorsal fin. This species does not have an infraorbital lateral canal, but has a complete lateral line.

== Distribution and habitat ==
Protogobius is endemic to New Caledonia where it is only known from 9 watercourses on the Southern Province on Grande Terre. This goby is found in rivers with ultramafic beds.

== Biology ==
Protogobius is a predator of small crustacaeans, particularly shrimps in the family Atyidae. This is an amphidromous species, the adults spend their whole lives in freshwater but when they spawn the larvae drift downstream to the rivers' mouths and the sea. The larvae spend a 2 to 6 months in the sea before they move into the estuaries and metamorphose, returning to the rivers to settle as adults. These gobies dive into the substrate when threatened leaving the mouth, eyes and first dorsal fin exposed.

== Conservation status ==
Protogobius has been assessed as Endangered by the International Union for Conservation of Nature because this species has a restricted distribution and its habiata is threatened by deforestation and mining.
