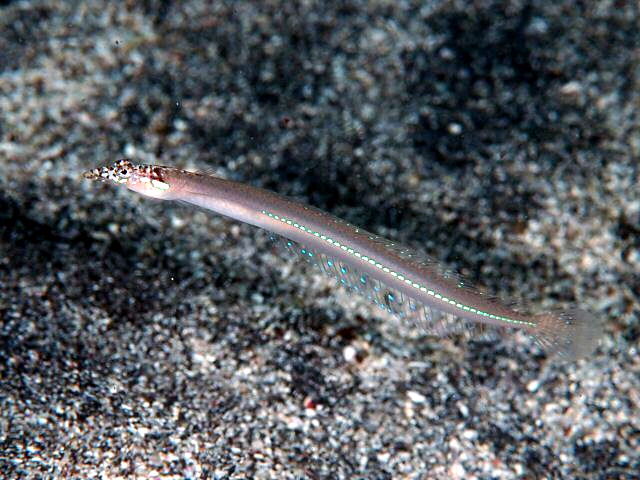
- Trichonotus filamentosus

Scientific classification
- Kingdom: Animalia
- Phylum: Chordata
- Class: Actinopterygii
- Division: Teleostei
- Order: Gobiiformes
- Suborder: Trichonotoidei
- Family: Trichonotidae; Bleeker, 1859
- Genus: Trichonotus; Bloch & J. G. Schneider, 1801

Type species
- Trichonotus setiger Bloch & Schneider, 1801

= Trichonotus =

Genus of fishes

Trichonotus is a genus of marine gobiiform fishes. Species of Trichonotus are distributed throughout the Indo-West Pacific. This genus is the only member of the family Trichonotidae and of the suborder Trichonotoidei. They are considered the sister group to the gobies (Gobioidei).

== Description ==
Trichonotus species have jutting lower jaws, five soft rays, and single pelvic spines. In males, the anterior rays on their dorsal fins may be extended. Their lateral lines run along the middle flank. On the back end of the lateral line scales is a deep, V-shaped notch. The type species is Trichonotus setiger.

== Species ==
There are currently 10 recognized species in this genus:

- Trichonotus arabicus J. E. Randall & A. B. Tarr, 1994 (Arabian sand-diver)
- Trichonotus blochii Castelnau, 1875 (Bloch's sand-diver)
- Trichonotus cyclograptus Alcock, 1890 (Bengal sand-diver)
- Trichonotus elegans Shimada & Yoshino, 1984 (Long-rayed sand-diver)
- Trichonotus filamentosus Steindachner, 1867
- Trichonotus halstead E. Clark & Pohle, 1996 (Gold-bar sand-diver)
- Trichonotus marleyi J. L. B. Smith, 1936
- Trichonotus nikii E. Clark & K. von Schmidt, 1966
- Trichonotus setiger Bloch & J. G. Schneider, 1801 (Spotted sand-diver)
- Trichonotus somaliensis Katayama, Motomura & Endo, 2012 (Somalian sand-diver)
