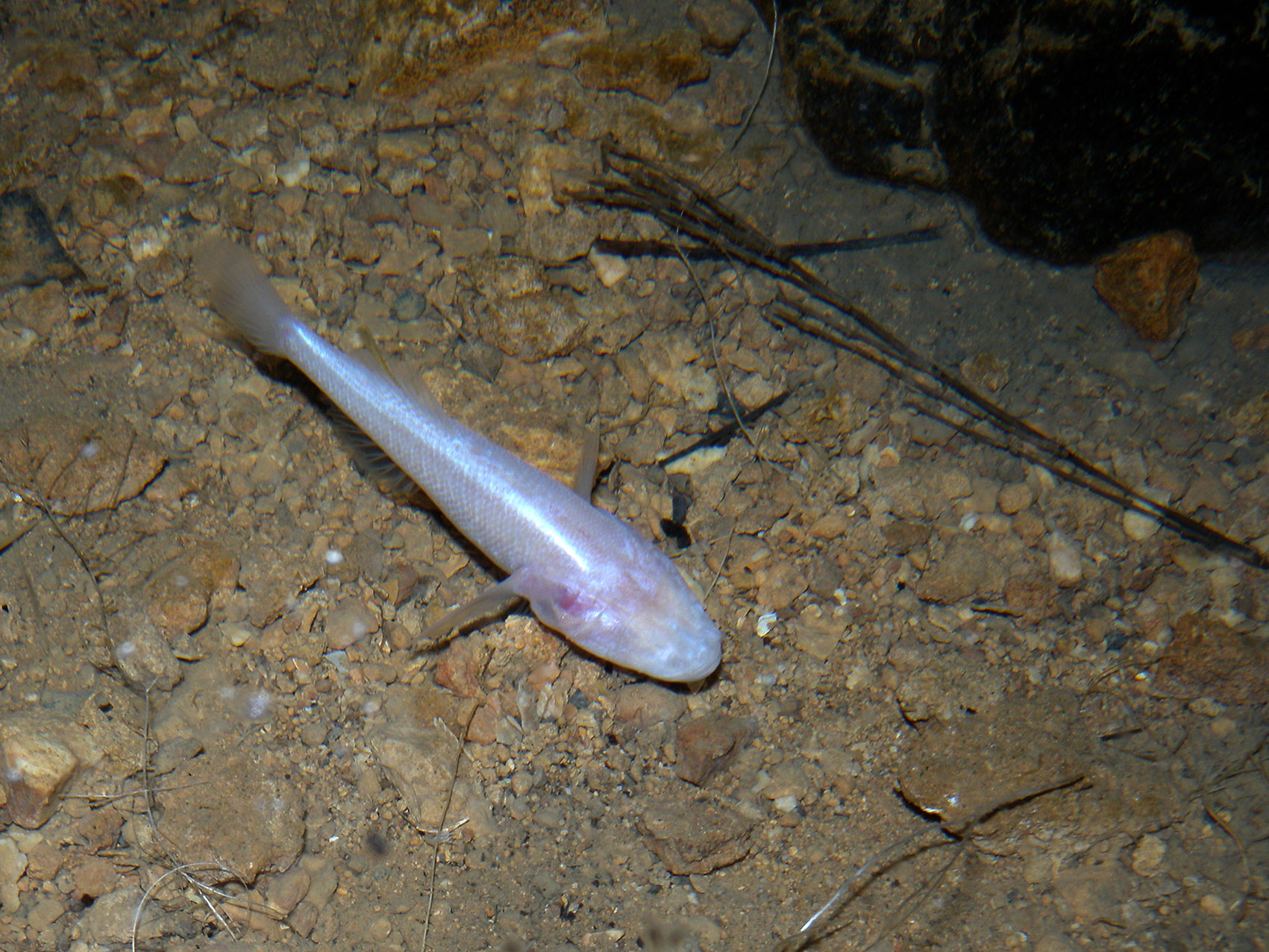

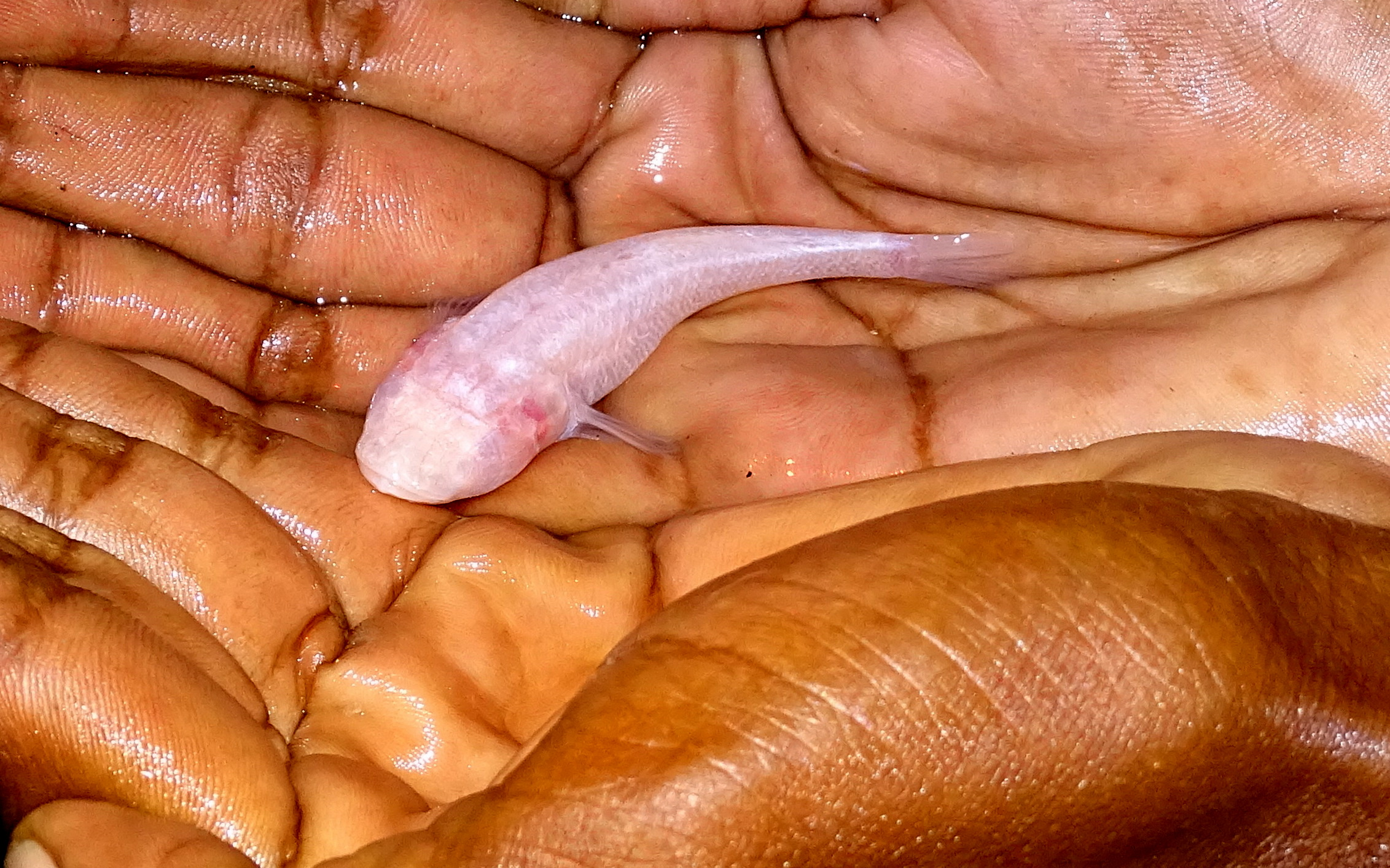
- Typhleotris madagascariensis in the Tsimanampetsotsa National Park

Conservation status
- Endangered (IUCN 3.1)

Scientific classification
- Kingdom: Animalia
- Phylum: Chordata
- Class: Actinopterygii
- Division: Teleostei
- Order: Gobiiformes
- Family: Milyeringidae
- Genus: Typhleotris
- Species: T. madagascariensis

Binomial name
- Typhleotris madagascariensis Petit, 1933

= Typhleotris madagascariensis =

Species of fish

Typhleotris madagascariensis is a species of fish in the family Milyeringidae that is endemic to Madagascar, where it is only known from underground waters in the southwestern portion of the island. This cavefish is blind and lacks pigmentation, and can reach a standard length of 8 cm (3.1 in).

This species is known from more than 10 caves and sinkholes in the Mahafaly Plateau region, in places where the water temperature typically ranges from 26 to 30 °C (79–86 °F) and the pH is slightly above neutral. Although considered endangered because of its restricted range and not found to be common anywhere in its range in earlier studies, recent surveys found that the species is locally abundant, occurring in especially high numbers in the Andranoilove, Andriamaniloke, Lalia and Mitoho caves. In the southern part of its range, T. madagascariensis co-occurs with T. mararybe, which is not as common or widespread. T. madagascariensis feeds on various invertebrates.

Some of the limestone caves where this fish can be found are protected by the Tsimanampetsotsa National Park, including the Mitoho Grotto tourist site. The IUCN currently assess the species as Endangered, but it has stated that further research is necessary on the taxonomic status of different populations of T. madagascarensis as the populations in unconnected cave systems may actually be allopatric species; if this is the case then the IUCN's assessment may require to be changed to Critically Endangered as the range for any individual species will be less than that for T. madagascarensis sensu lato.
