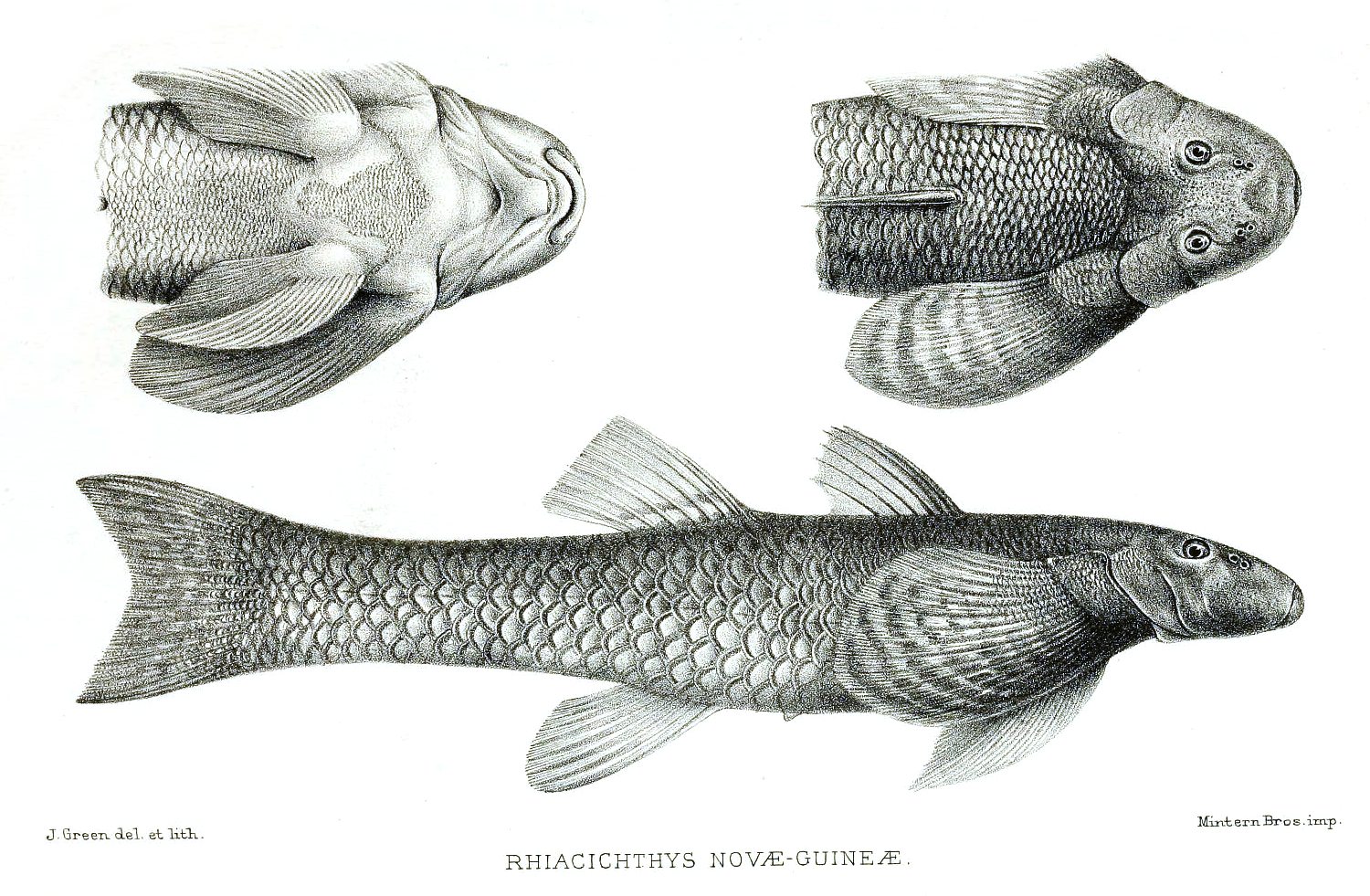

Scientific classification
- Domain: Eukaryota
- Kingdom: Animalia
- Phylum: Chordata
- Class: Actinopterygii
- Superorder: Acanthopterygii
- Clade: Percomorpha
- Order: Gobiiformes
- Family: Rhyacichthyidae; Jordan, 1905

Genera
- Protogobius; Rhyacichthys; See text for species.

= Rhyacichthyidae =

Loach gobies

Family of fishes

The Rhyacichthyidae or loach gobies are a small family of perciform fish in two genera. The three species all inhabit rivers and streams, often with fast flow. R. aspro is widespread in Western Pacific region (China and Japan to New Guinea and the Solomons), but the two remaining species are restricted to New Caledonia and Vanuatu. Little is known about their breeding behavior, but the eggs or larvae float down into the sea where the young grow up, only to later return to the adult river and stream habitat. They are fairly small fish, no more than 25 cm (10 in) in standard length.

== Species ==
- Genus Protogobius
  - Protogobius attiti Watson & Pöllabauer, 1998
- Genus Rhyacichthys
  - Rhyacichthys aspro (Valenciennes, 1837) - loach goby
  - Rhyacichthys guilberti Dingerkus & Séret, 1992
