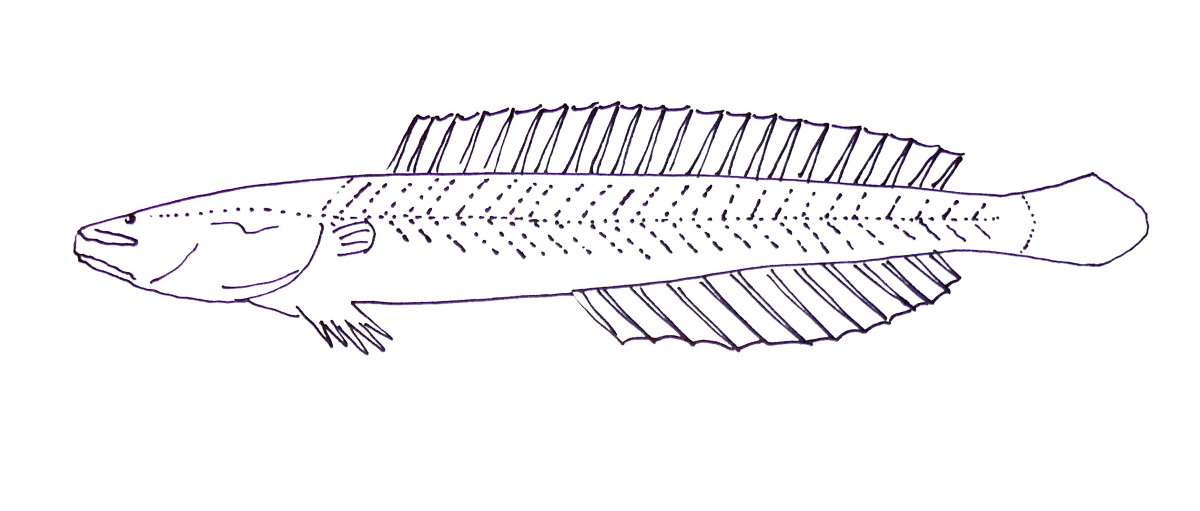
- Samoan sand dart (Kraemeria samoensis)

Scientific classification
- Kingdom: Animalia
- Phylum: Chordata
- Class: Actinopterygii
- Order: Gobiiformes
- Family: Kraemeriidae; Whitley, 1935

Genera
- Gobitrichinotus; Kraemeria

= Kraemeriidae =

Sand darters

Group of fishes

Kraemeriinae is a subfamily of ray-finned fish in the family Gobiidae, commonly known as sand darters. They were previously treated as the separate family Kraemeriidae, but were reclassified after molecular analyses found them to be nested within Gobiidae.

These fish are Indo-Pacific, being native to the Indian Ocean to the central Pacific Ocean. They live in sandy shallow pools and are found among coral. One species is restricted to fresh waters of Madagascar. In breeding coloration the male fish has an occelated spot at the rear of the first dorsal fin.
