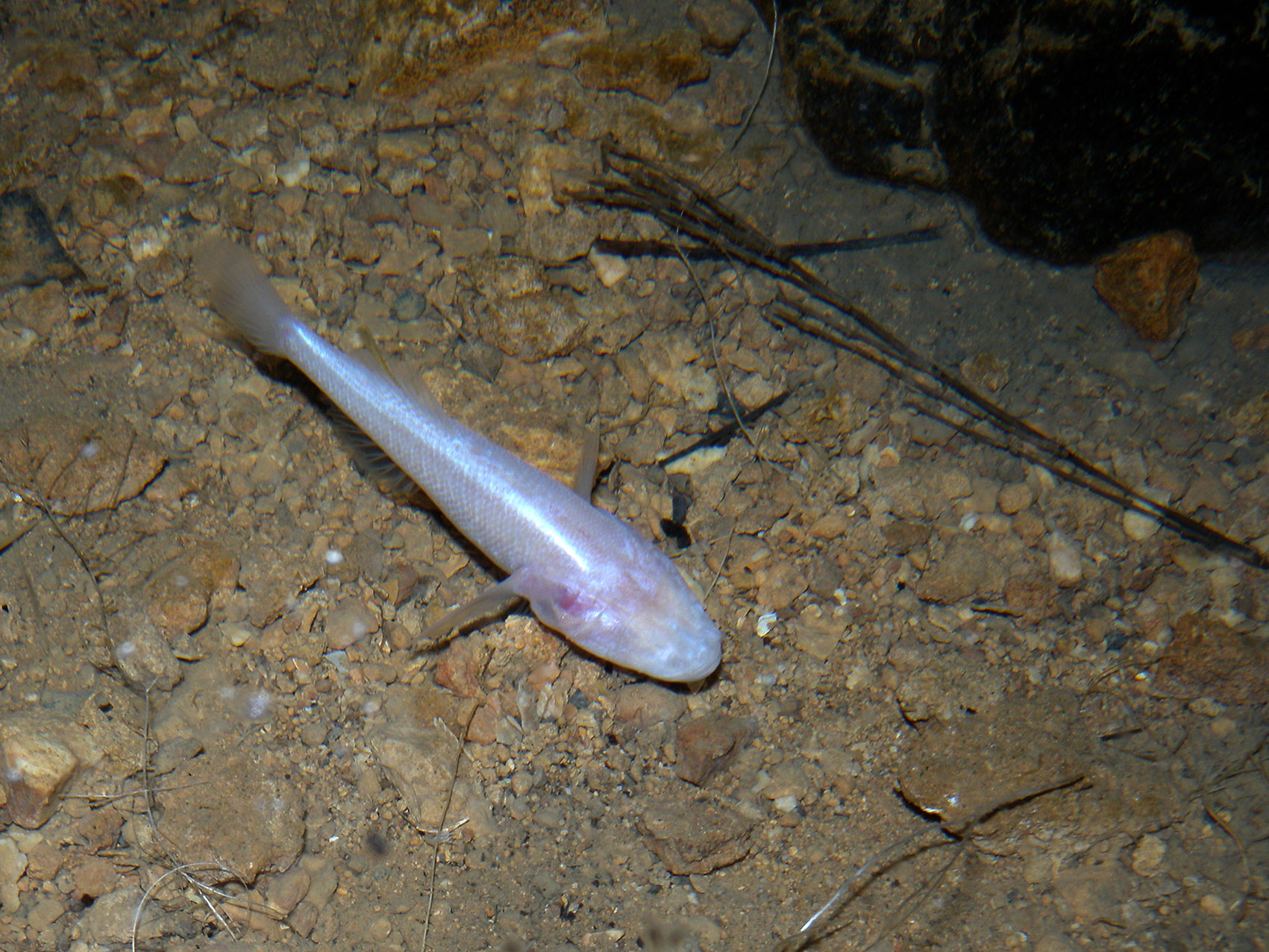
- Typhleotris madgascarensis

Scientific classification
- Kingdom: Animalia
- Phylum: Chordata
- Class: Actinopterygii
- Order: Gobiiformes
- Suborder: Gobioidei
- Family: Milyeringidae; Whitley, 1945

= Milyeringidae =

Subfamily of ray-finned fishes, blind cave gobies

Milyeringinae, the blind cave gobies, is a subfamily of gobies in the family Eleotridae. There are two genera and six species within the subfamily: one genus (Milyeringa) is restricted to caves in the North West Cape region of Australia and the other (Typhleotris) to underground water systems in Madagascar. They are all troglobitic species and have lost their eyes.

== Genera ==
The two genera in the family are:

- Milyeringa Whitley, 1945
- Typhleotris Petit, 1933
