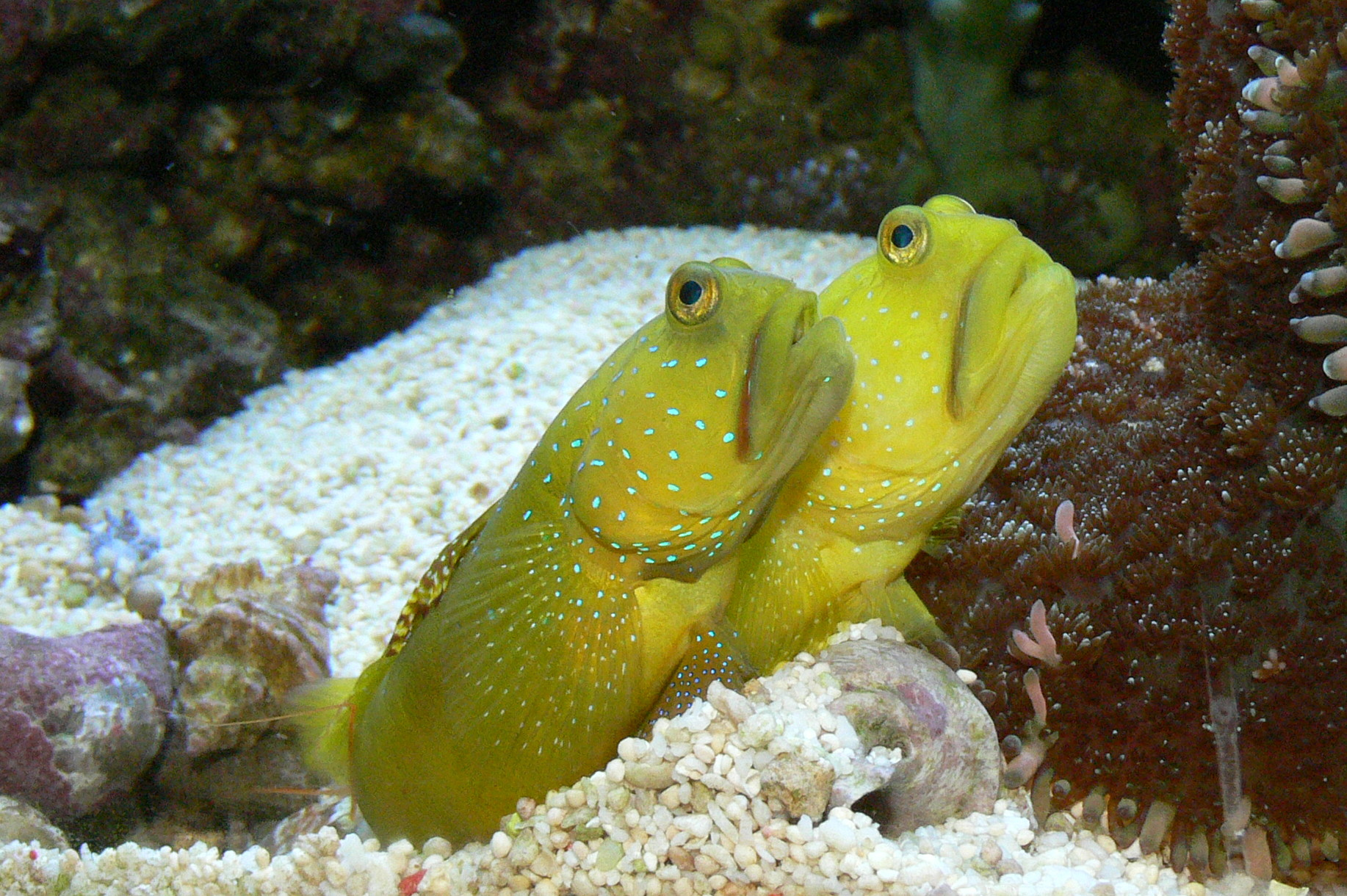
- Yellow prawn-goby, Cryptocentrus cinctus

Scientific classification
- Kingdom: Animalia
- Phylum: Chordata
- Class: Actinopterygii
- Division: Teleostei
- Superorder: Acanthopterygii
- Clade: Percomorpha
- Order: Gobiiformes
- Suborder: Gobioidei; Bleeker, 1849

Type species
- Gobius niger Linnaeus, 1758

Families
- Rhyacichthyidae; Odontobutidae; Milyeringidae; Eleotridae; Xenisthmidae; Butidae; Thalasseleotrididae; Oxudercidae; Gobiidae

= Gobioidei =

Gobioidei Temporal range: Early Eocene to present

Order of fishes

The Gobioidei are a suborder of percomorph fish. Many of these fishes are called gobies. It is by far the largest and most diverse order within the order Gobiiformes, and one of the most diverse groups of ray-finned fish in general.

The suborder, which was previously considered a suborder of Perciformes, is made up of about 2,211 species that are divided between seven families. Phylogenetic relationships of the Gobioidei have been elucidated using molecular data. Gobies are primarily small species, often with large heads and tapered bodies, that live in marine water, but roughly 10% of these species inhabit fresh water. This order is composed chiefly of benthic or burrowing species; like many other benthic fishes, most gobioids do not have a gas bladder or any other means of controlling their buoyancy in water, so they must spend most of their time on or near the bottom.

Traditionally most of the species called gobies have been classified in the order Perciformes as the suborder Gobioidei but in the 5th Edition of Fishes of the World this suborder is elevated to an order Gobiiformes within the clade Percomorpha. In the most recent taxonomic treatment, they are again placed as the suborder Gobioidei within an expanded Gobiiformes.

== Nomenclature ==
Not all the species in the Gobiiformes are referred to as gobies; "true gobies" are placed in the family Gobiidae, while other species referred to as gobies have been placed in the Oxudercidae. Goby is also used to describe some species which are not classified within the order Gobiiformes, such as the engineer goby or convict blenny (Pholidichthys leucotaenia). The word goby derives from the Latin gobius meaning "gudgeon", and some species of goby, especially the sleeper gobies in the family Eleotridae and some of the dartfishes are called "gudgeons", especially in Australia.

== Evolution ==
The earliest known fossil member of the group is Carlomonnius Bannikov & Carnevale, 2016 from the Early Eocene-aged Monte Bolca site of Italy. This genus was previously considered an indeterminate gobioid, but a later study that analyzed more specimens determined it to be a stem-member of the Butidae. Slightly older evidence of fossil gobioids is known from isolated otoliths ("genus Gobiidarum" nolfi and "genus Gobiidarum" vastani) recovered from the Cambay Formation of Gujarat, India.

Phylogenetic evidence suggests that two of the most diverse families within the group, Gobiidae and Oxudercidae, are relatively young compared to many other fish families, diverging during the Late Eocene or middle Oligocene. Uniquely, they appear to have diversified during the midst of the Eocene-Oligocene extinction event.

== Taxonomy ==
Until the early 21st century, the gobies were placed within the Perciformes as the suborder Gobioidei. However, phylogenetic studies identified them as being a particularly basal percomorph group related to the cardinalfish and nurseryfish. For this reason, the 5th Edition of the Fishes of the World reclassified the former superfamily Goboidei as the order Gobiiformes and also rearranged the families within the order compared to the previous edition. The largest change is that the Oxudercidae and the Gobiidae are split into two families, with the Oxudercidae containing the species formerly classified as the Gobiidae subfamilies Amblyopinae, Gobionellinae, Oxudercinae and Sicydiinae while merging the families Kraemeriidae, Microdesmidae, Ptereleotridae and Schindleriidae into the family Gobiidae, though no subfamilies within the Gobiidae were proposed.

More recently, Eschmeyer's Catalog of Fishes has retained aspects of this classification, but returned the Gobioidei to being a suborder, now within an expanded Gobiiformes that also includes the Apogonoidei and the Trichonotoidei. In addition, Xenisthmidae is now recognized as its own family, while Butidae and Milyeringidae have returned to being treated as subfamilies of Eleotridae.

Phylogeny of Gobiiformes

- - Trichonotoidei
    Trichonotidae
  - Gobioidei
    - - Rhyacichthyidae
      - Odontobutidae
    - - Milyeringidae
      - - Eleotridae
        - - Butidae
          - - Thalasseleotrididae
            - - Oxudercidae (Gobionellidae)
              - Gobiidae

The following classification is based on Eschmeyer's Catalog of Fishes, with fossil taxa also added:

- Suborder Gobioidei
  - Genus †Laubeichthys Reichenbacher & Přikryl, 2024 (fossil; Early Oligocene of the Czech Republic)
  - Genus †Simpsonigobius Dirnberger, Bauer & Reichenbacher, 2024 (fossil; Early Miocene of Turkey)
  - Family Rhyacichthyidae Jordan, 1905 (loach gobies)
  - Family Odontobutidae Hoese & Gill, 1993 (Asian freshwater sleepers)
  - Family Milyeringidae Whitley, 1945 (cave gudgeons)
  - Family Eleotridae Bonaparte, 1835 (sleepers or bullies)
  - Family Xenisthmidae Miller, 1973 (collared wrigglers)
  - Family Butidae Bleeker, 1874 (gudgeons)
  - Family Thalasseleotrididae Gill & Mooi, 2012 (ocean sleepers)
  - Family †Pirskeniidae Obrhelová, 1961 (fossil; Early Oligocene of the Czech Republic)
  - Family Oxudercidae Günther, 1861 (mudskippers and allies)
    - Subfamily Oxudercinae Günther, 1861 (mudskippers)
    - Subfamily Amblyopinae Günther, 1861 (mudburrowing gobies)
    - Subfamily Gobionellinae Bleeker, 1874 (estuarine gobies)
    - Subfamily Sicydiinae Gill, 1860 (rock-climbing gobies)
  - Family Gobiidae Cuvier, 1816 (gobies)
    - Subfamily Kraemeriinae Whitley, 1935 (1911) (sand darts)
    - Subfamily Ptereleotrinae Bleeker, 1875 (dart-gobies)
    - Subfamily Gobiinae Cuvier, 1816 (sea gobies)
    - Subfamily Microdesminae Regan, 1912 (wormfishes)

=== Families ===
==== Rhyacichthyidae ====
The loach-gobies are a small family, with only three species split between two genera, which inhabits marine and fresh water in Oceania and the western Pacific. These are thought to be among the more primitive species of the Gobioidei.

==== Odontobutidae ====
The Odontobutidae, or freshwater sleepers, contains 22 species between 6 genera from eastern Asia. This family is the sister to all the other Gobioidei in a clade with the Rhyacichthyidae.

==== Milyeringidae ====
The Milyeringidae contains two genera of cave fish, one in Western Australia and one at the other side of the Indian Ocean in Madagascar; both genera contain three recognized species. This family forms a second clade of the Gobioidei.

==== Eleotridae ====
The sleeper gobies are a family of twenty six genera and 126 species found in freshwater and mangrove habitats throughout the tropical and temperate parts of the world as far north as the eastern United States and as far south as Stewart Island, New Zealand, except for the eastern Atlantic. Fossils of Eleotrid gobies are known from the Late Oligocene. The families Milyeringidae and Butidae were formerly classified as subfamilies of the Eleotridae but are not found to be close to the Eleotridae senus stricto in this system.

==== Butidae ====
The Butidae are one of the two families which are given the common name "sleeper gobies", and indeed were formerly classified as subfamily of the traditional sleeper goby family Eleotridae, although some phylogenies have placed them closer to the Oxucerdidae and the Gobiidae than to the Eleotridae. They are found in the Indo-Pacific and in West Africa, and contains 10 genera with 46 species split between them.

==== Thalasseleotrididae ====
The family Thalasseleotrididae is considered to be a sister group to the family Gobiidae and is separated as a family by the authors of this classification based on recent molecular studies. It comprises two genera of marine gobies from the temperate waters of Australia and New Zealand, with a total of three species between them.

==== Oxudercidae ====
Oxudercidae is a family of gobies comprising species previously split between four subfamilies of the family Gobiidae. The family is sometimes referred to as the Gobionellidae, but Oxucerdidae has priority. The species in this family have a cosmopolitan distribution in temperate and tropical areas and are found in marine and freshwater environments, typically in inshore, euryhaline areas with silt and sand substrates. The family contains 86 genera and about 600 species. Many species in this family can be found in fresh water and a number of species are found on wet beaches; some are able to survive for extended periods out of water, most famously the mudskippers.

==== Gobiidae ====
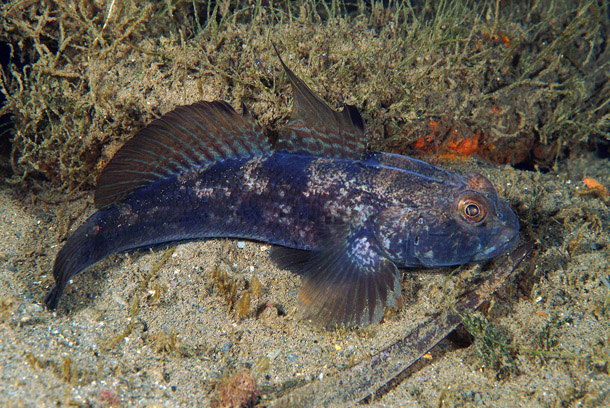
Gobius niger, the type species of Gobius, which is the type genus of Gobiidae, which in turn gives the name of the order Gobioidei

The Gobiidae as recognized in this classification now includes the former members of several families which other classifications have regarded as valid families. As classified in this work the family remains one of the most speciose families of marine fish, as well as being one of the most numerous groups of fishes in freshwater habitats on oceanic islands.

They are most diverse in the tropical Indo-West Pacific but the family is well represented in temperate waters in both the northern and southern hemispheres. They are mostly free living fishes found alone or in small schools, but some form associations with invertebrates, especially in coral reefs. About 120 species are known to form such symbiotic relationships; members of the genera Amblyeleotris and Cryptocentrus, for example, cohabit in burrows with alpheid shrimps, while other species live as cleaner fish, e.g Elacatinus. They can be sequential hermaphrodites and numerous species are known to exhibit parental care. Many species have fused pelvic fins that can be used as a suction device; some island species, such as the red-tailed stream goby (Lentipes concolor), are able to use these pelvic fins to ascend rock faces alongside waterfalls, allowing them to inhabit waters far from the ocean. Some of the species that are found in fresh water as adults spawn in the ocean and are catadromous, not unlike the eels of the family Anguillidae. Along with the blennies, the Gobiidae constitute a dominant part of the benthic, small fish fauna in tropical reef habitats.

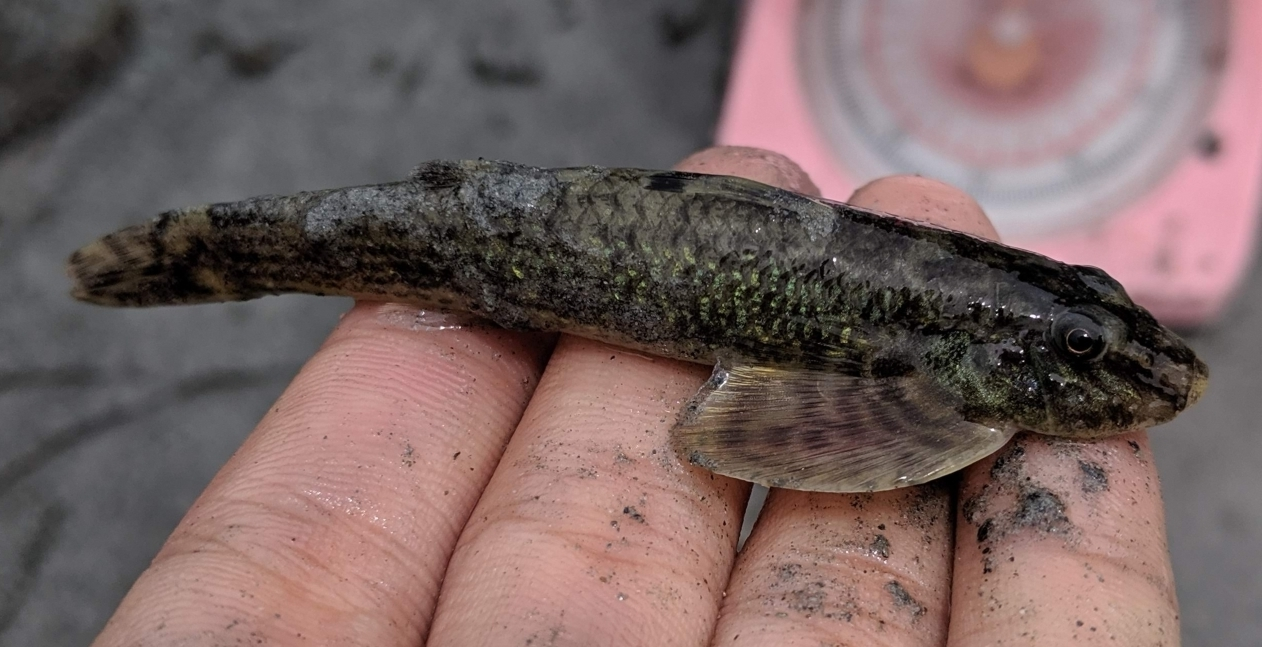
Rhyacichthys aspro; Rhyacichthyidae

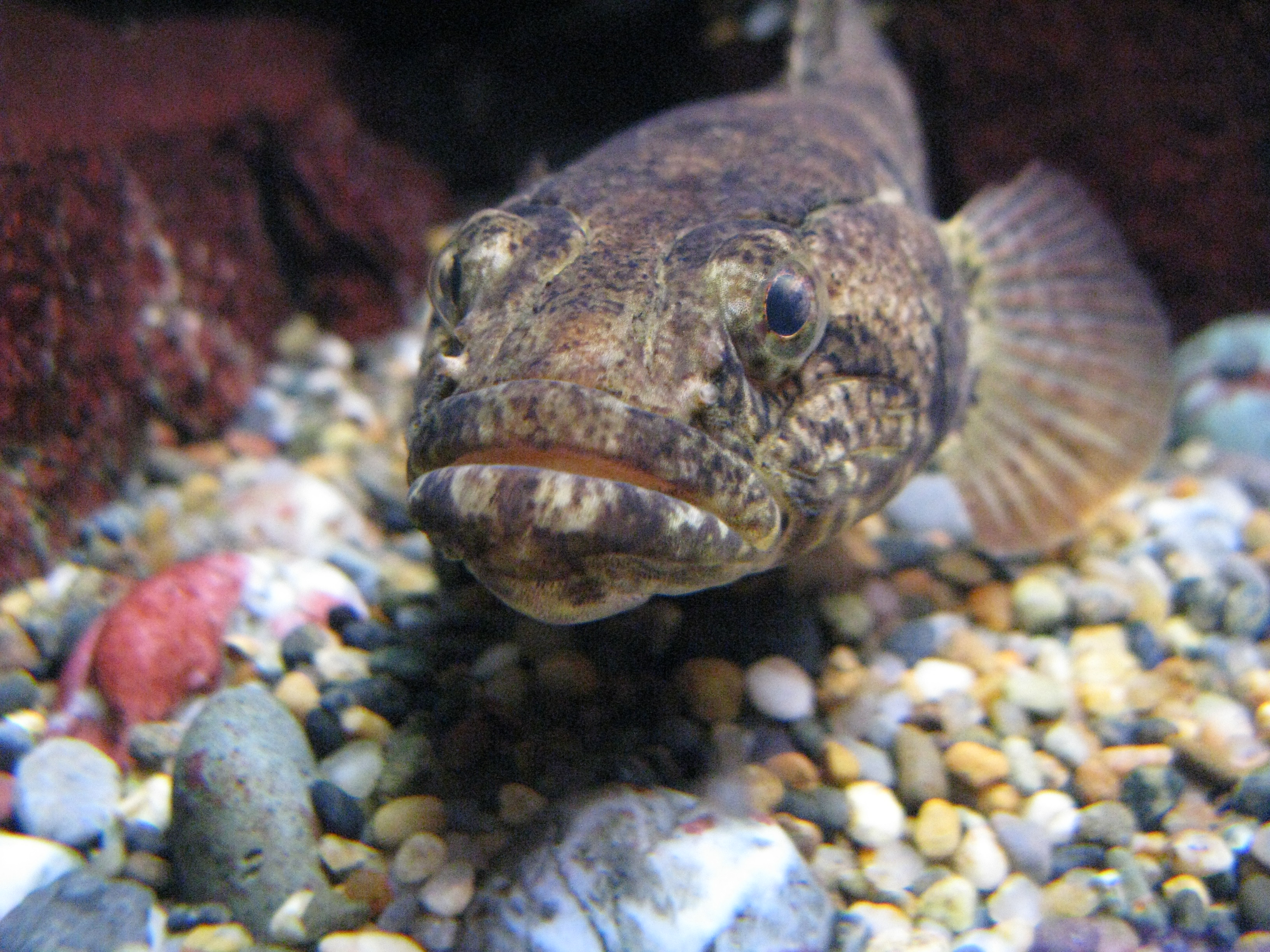
Odontobutis obscura; Odontobutidae

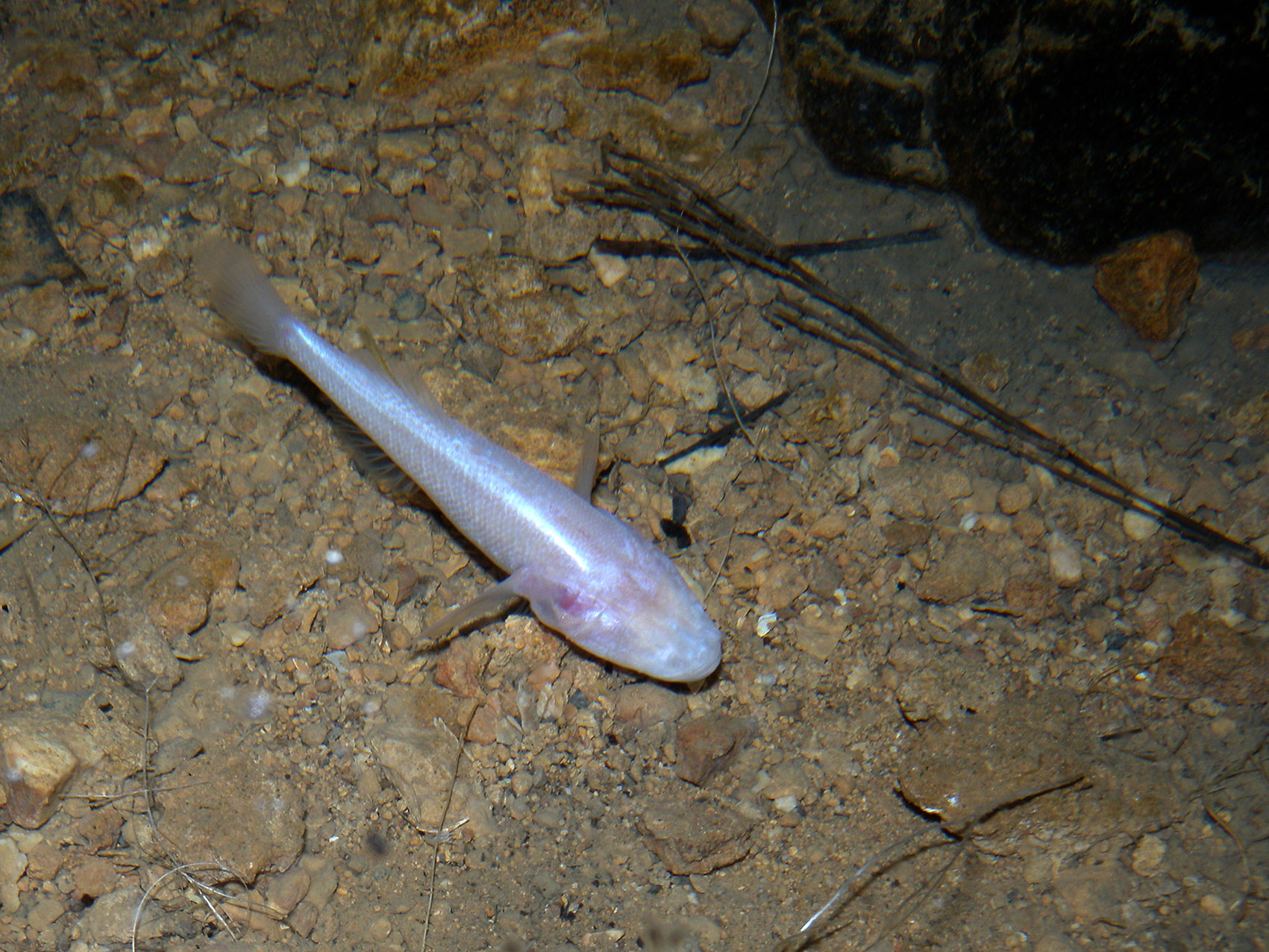
Typhleotris madagascariensis; Milyeringidae

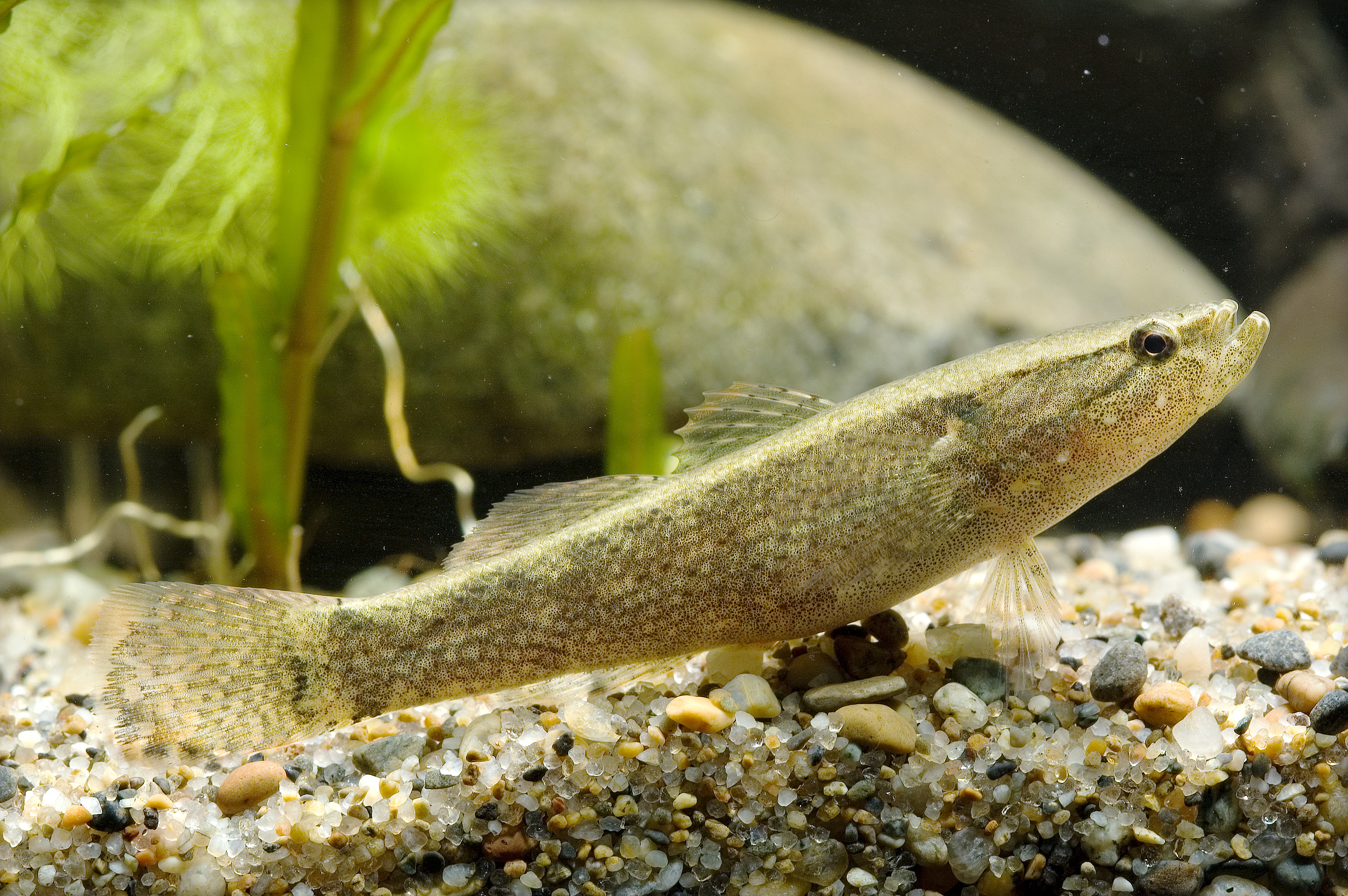
Eleotris oxycephala; Eleotridae

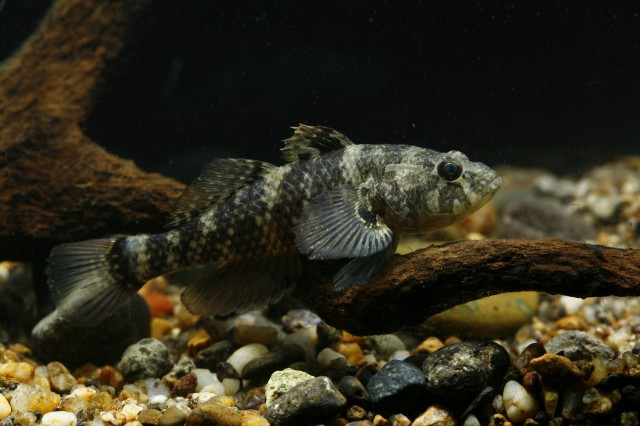
Butis koilomatodon; Butidae

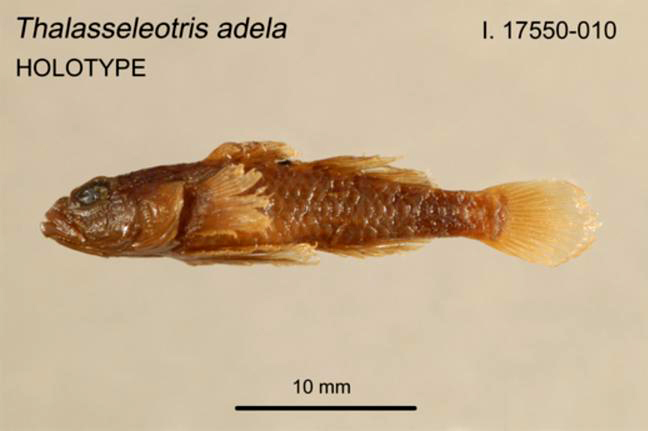
Thalasseleotris adela; Thalasseleotrididae

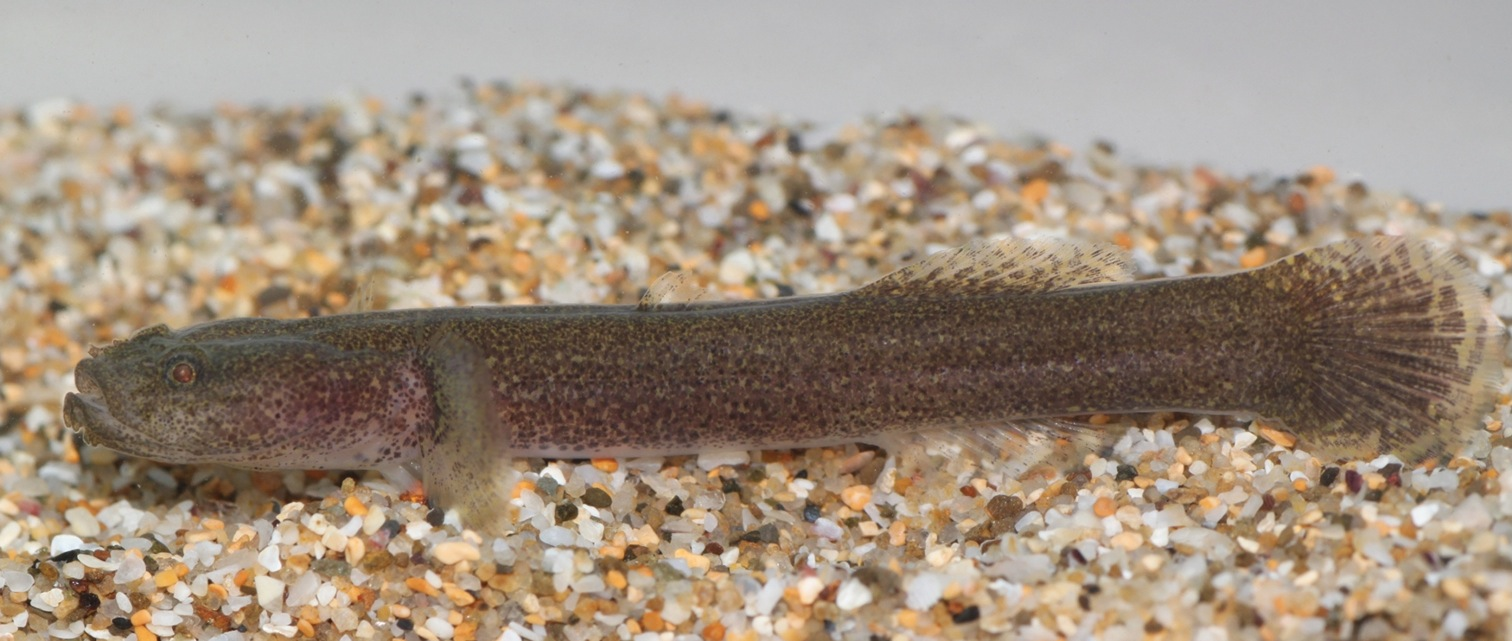
Clariger taiwanensis; Oxudercidae

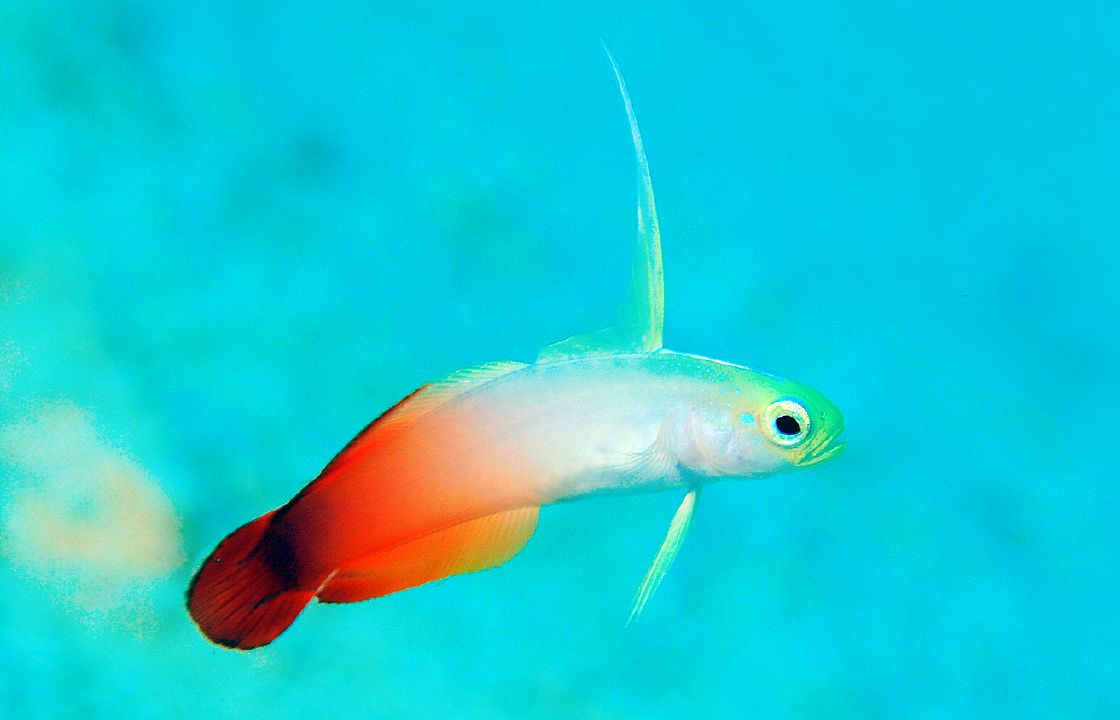
Nemateleotris magnifica; Gobiidae
