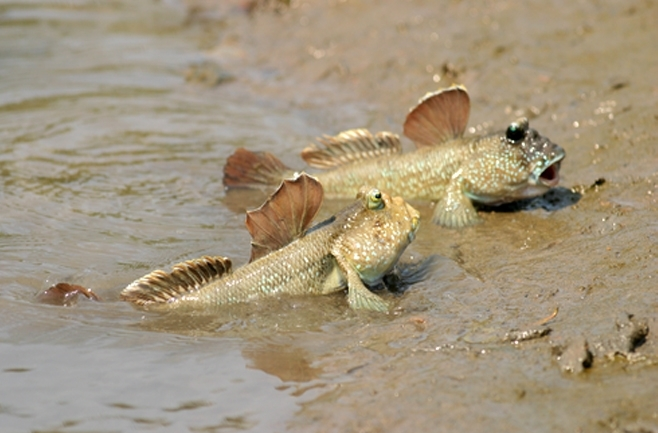
- Shuttles mudskipper (Periophthalmus modestus)
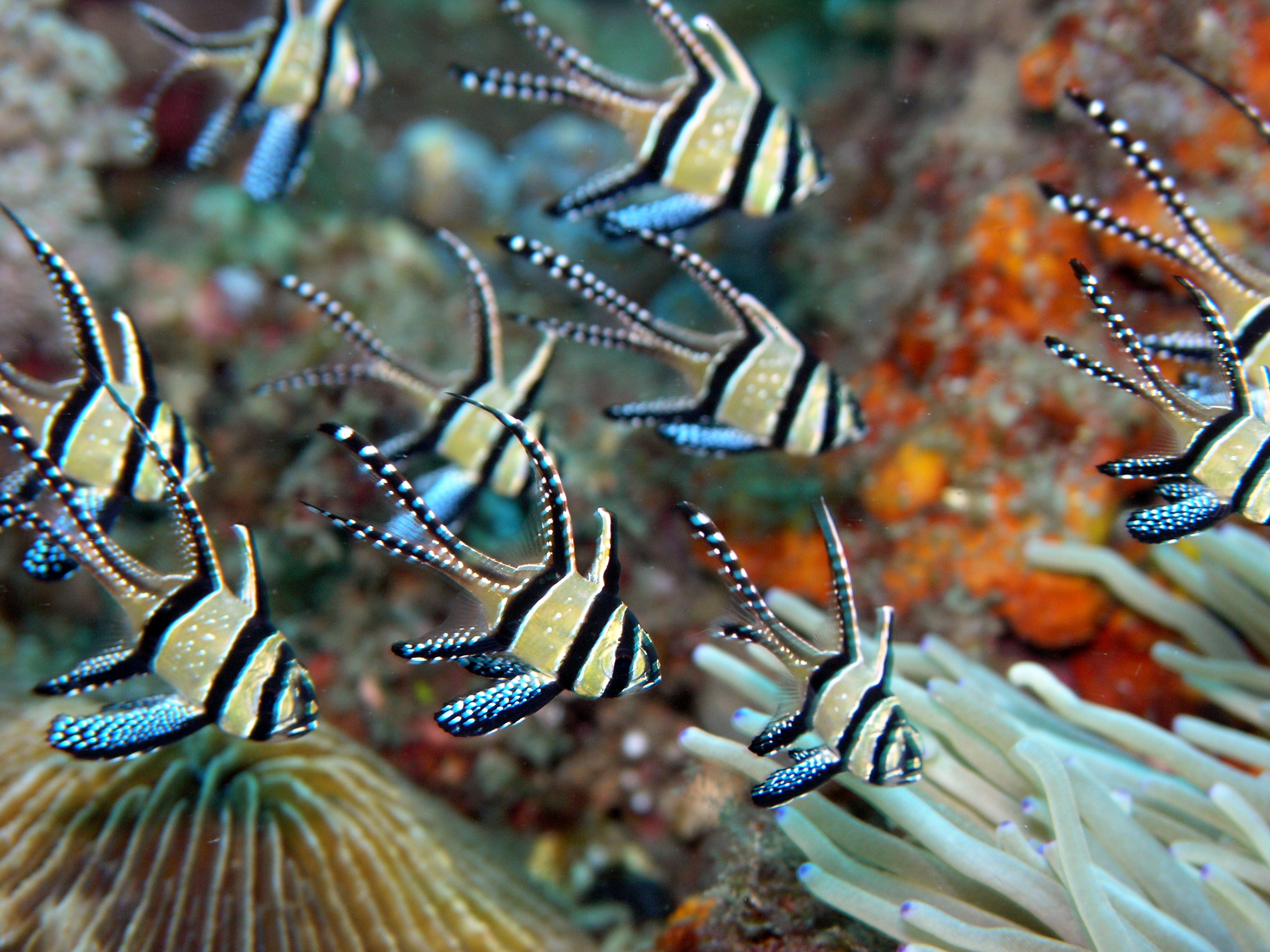
- Banggai cardinalfish (Pterapogon kauderni)

Scientific classification
- Kingdom: Animalia
- Phylum: Chordata
- Class: Actinopterygii
- Clade: Percomorpha
- Order: Gobiiformes; Bleeker, 1859

Families
- See text

= Gobiiformes =

Gobiiformes Temporal range: Maastrichtian–present

Order of fishes

Gobiiformes /ˈɡoʊbi.ɪfɔːrmiːz/ (meaning "goby-like") is an order of percomorph fish containing three suborders: Apogonoidei, Trichonotoidei, and Gobioidei. The order was formerly defined as containing only the gobies (now placed within the Gobioidei). However, more recent taxonomic treatments also place their close relatives (the cardinalfishes, nurseryfishes, and sand-divers) with them, based on phylogenetic studies that unexpectedly found a close relationship between these groups. The Gobioidei are the most speciose clade of the family.

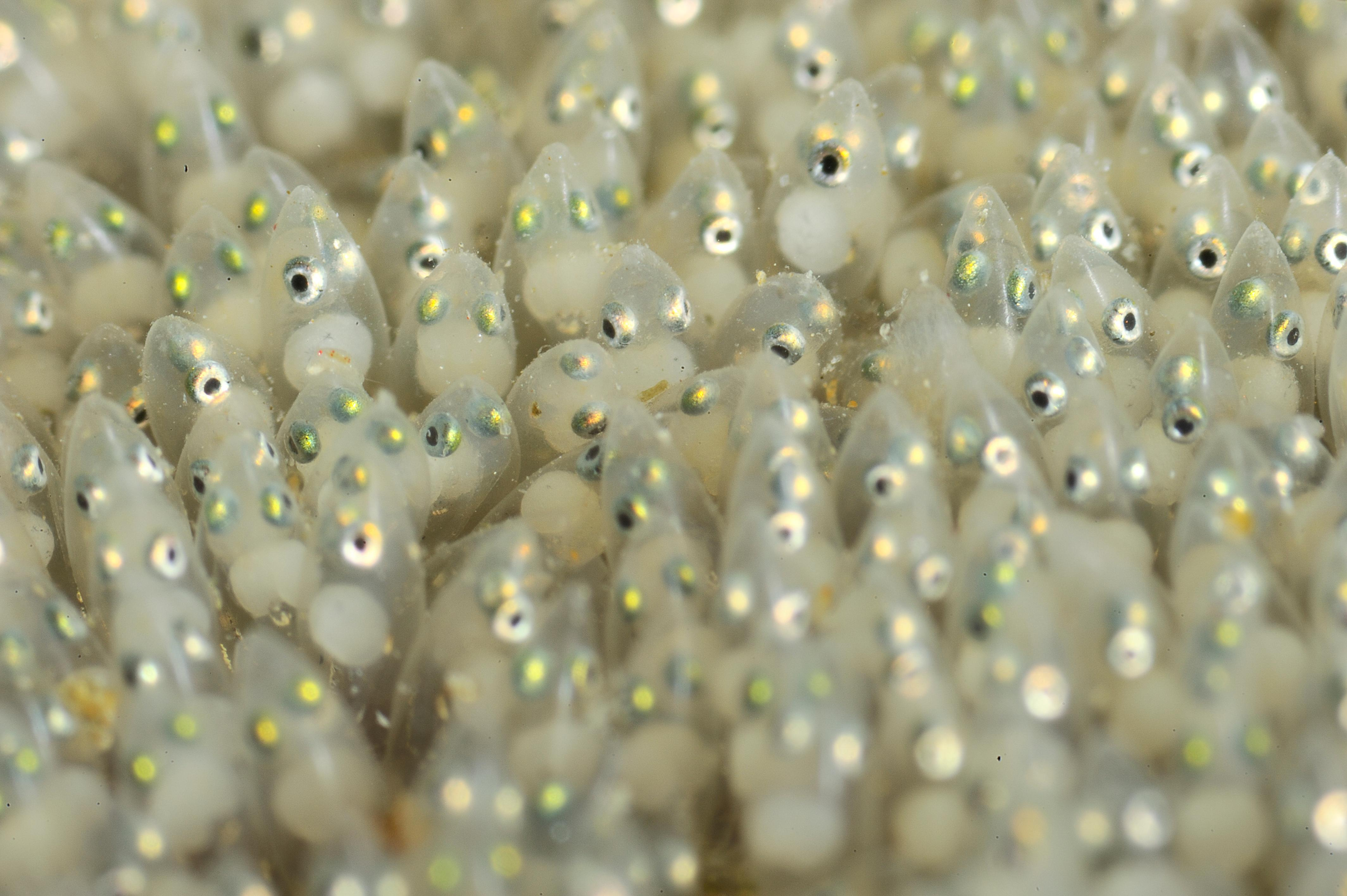
Goby eggs attached to rocks, showing their distinctive adhesive nature

Despite the differing appearances of members of this group, all share the trait of adhesive eggs with elaborate structures. Many species within this group also display elaborate forms of parental care by the male.

Gobiiforms are a relatively basal clade of the percomorphs, with only the ophidiiforms and batrachoidiforms being more basal. They are estimated to have diverged from the rest of the group during the early-to-mid Cretaceous (about 120 million years ago), and the first presumed fossils of the family are of apogonid otoliths from the Maastrichtian. This suggests that all three suborders within the group had diverged during the Late Cretaceous. However, much of the order's modern diversity, especially within the gobioids, appears to have evolved relatively recently.

== Taxonomy ==
The following taxonomy is followed by Eschmeyer's Catalog of Fishes:

- Order Gobiiformes
  - Suborder Apogonoidei
    - Family Kurtidae Bleeker, 1859 (nurseryfishes)
    - Family Apogonidae Günther, 1859 (cardinalfishes)
  - Suborder Trichonotoidei
    - Family Trichonotidae Günther, 1861 (sand-divers)
  - Suborder Gobioidei
    - Family Rhyacichthyidae Jordan, 1905 (loach gobies)
    - Family Odontobutidae Hoese & Gill, 1993 (Asian freshwater sleepers)
    - Family Milyeringidae Whitley, 1945 (cave gudgeons)
    - Family Eleotridae Bonaparte, 1835 (sleepers or bullies)
    - Family Xenisthmidae Miller, 1973 (collared wrigglers)
    - Family Butidae Bleeker 1874 (gudgeons)
    - Family Thalasseleotrididae Gill & Mooi, 2012 (ocean sleepers)
    - Family Oxudercidae Günther, 1861 (mudskippers and allies)
    - Family Gobiidae Cuvier, 1816 (gobies)
