= List of Alpheus species =

As of June 2023, the following species are recognised in the shrimp genus Alpheus:

== A ==
- Alpheus abumusa Dehghani, Sari & Naderloo, 2019
- Alpheus acutocarinatus De Man, 1909
- Alpheus acutofemoratus Dana, 1852
- Alpheus adamastor Coutière, 1908
- Alpheus aequus Kim & Abele, 1988
- Alpheus africanus Balss, 1916
- Alpheus agilis Anker, Hurt & Knowlton, 2009
- Alpheus agrogon Ramos, 1997
- Alpheus alaincrosnieri Anker, 2020
- Alpheus albatrossae (AH Banner, 1953)
- Alpheus alcyone De Man, 1902
- Alpheus alpheopsides Coutière, 1905
- Alpheus amarillo Anker, 2012
- Alpheus amblyonyx Chace, 1972
- Alpheus amirantei Coutière, 1908
- Alpheus anchistus De Man, 1920
- Alpheus angulosus McClure, 2002
- Alpheus angustilineatus Nomura & Anker, 2005
- Alpheus ankeri Dehghani, Sari & Naderloo, 2019
- Alpheus antepaenultimus Kim & Abele, 1988
- Alpheus architectus De Man, 1897
- Alpheus arenensis (Chace, 1937)
- Alpheus arenicolus Banner & Banner, 1983
- Alpheus arethusa De Man, 1909
- Alpheus armatus Rathbun, 1901
- Alpheus armillatus H. Milne Edwards, 1837
- Alpheus arnoa Banner, 1957
- Alpheus astrinx Banner & Banner, 1982
- Alpheus australiensis Banner & Banner, 1982
- Alpheus australosulcatus Banner & Banner, 1982

== B ==
- Alpheus baccheti Anker, 2010
- Alpheus bahamensis Rankin, 1898
- Alpheus balaenodigitus Banner & Banner, 1982
- Alpheus bannerorum Bruce, 1987
- Alpheus barbadensis (Schmitt, 1924)
- Alpheus barbatus Coutière, 1897
- Alpheus batesi Banner & Banner, 1964
- Alpheus bellimanus Lockington, 1877
- Alpheus bellulus Miya & Miyake, 1969
- Alpheus bicostatus De Man, 1908
- Alpheus bidens (Olivier, 1811)
- Alpheus bisincisus De Haan, 1849
- Alpheus blachei Crosnier & Forest, 1965
- Alpheus bouvieri A. Milne-Edwards, 1878
- Alpheus brachymerus (AH Banner, 1953)
- Alpheus bradypus Coutière, 1905
- Alpheus brasileiro Anker, 2012
- Alpheus brevicristatus De Haan, 1844
- Alpheus brevipes Stimpson, 1860
- Alpheus brevirostris (Olivier, 1811)
- Alpheus brucei Banner & Banner, 1982
- Alpheus bucephaloides Nobili, 1905
- Alpheus bucephalus Coutière, 1905
- Alpheus buchanorum Banner & Banner, 1983
- Alpheus buckupi Almeida, Terossi, Araújo-Silva & Mantelatto, 2013
- Alpheus bunburius Banner & Banner, 1982
- Alpheus burukovskyi Anker & Pachelle, 2015

== C ==
- Alpheus californiensis Holmes, 1900
- Alpheus canaliculatus Banner & Banner, 1968
- Alpheus candei Guérin-Méneville, 1855
- Alpheus carlae Anker, 2012
- Alpheus cedrici Anker & De Grave, 2012
- Alpheus chacei Carvacho, 1979
- Alpheus chamorro Banner, 1956
- Alpheus chilensis Coutière in Lenz, 1902
- Alpheus chiragricus H. Milne Edwards, 1837
- Alpheus christofferseni Anker, Hurt & Knowlton, 2007
- Alpheus clamator Lockington, 1877
- Alpheus clypeatus Coutière, 1905
- Alpheus coetivensis Coutière, 1908
- Alpheus collumianus Stimpson, 1860
- Alpheus colombiensis Wicksten, 1988
- Alpheus compressus Banner & Banner, 1981
- Alpheus confusus Carvacho, 1989
- Alpheus coutierei De Man, 1909
- Alpheus crinitus Dana, 1852
- Alpheus cristatus Coutière, 1897
- Alpheus cristulifrons Rathbun, 1900
- Alpheus crockeri (Armstrong, 1941)
- Alpheus cyanoteles Yeo & Ng, 1996
- Alpheus cylindricus Kingsley, 1878
- Alpheus cythereus Banner & Banner, 1966

== D ==
- Alpheus dasycheles Coutière, 1908
- Alpheus davaoensis Chace, 1988
- Alpheus dentipes Guérin, 1832
- Alpheus deuteropus Hilgendorf, 1879
- Alpheus diadema Dana, 1852
- Alpheus digitalis De Haan, 1844
- Alpheus dingabadi Anker, 2023
- Alpheus dispar Randall, 1840
- Alpheus distinctus Kim & Abele, 1988
- Alpheus djeddensis Coutière, 1897
- Alpheus djiboutensis De Man, 1909
- Alpheus dolerus Banner, 1956

== E ==
- Alpheus echiurophilus Anker, Komai & Marin, 2015
- Alpheus edamensis De Man, 1888
- Alpheus edwardsii (Audouin, 1826)
- Alpheus ehlersii De Man, 1909
- Alpheus estuariensis Christoffersen, 1984
- Alpheus euchirus Dana, 1852
- Alpheus eulimene De Man, 1909
- Alpheus euphrosyne De Man, 1897
- Alpheus eurydactylus De Man, 1920
- Alpheus exilis Kim & Abele, 1988
- Alpheus explorator Boone, 1935

== F ==
- Alpheus facetus De Man, 1908
- Alpheus fagei Crosnier & Forest, 1965
- Alpheus fasciatus Lockington, 1878
- Alpheus fasqueli Anker, 2001
- Alpheus felgenhaueri Kim & Abele, 1988
- Alpheus fenneri Bruce, 1994
- Alpheus firmus Kim & Abele, 1988
- Alpheus floridanus Kingsley, 1878
- Alpheus foresti Banner & Banner, 1981
- Alpheus formosus Gibbes, 1850
- Alpheus frontalis H. Milne Edwards, 1837
- Alpheus fujitai Nomura & Anker, 2005
- Alpheus funafutensis Borradaile, 1899
- Alpheus fushima Nomura, 2009

== G ==
- Alpheus galapagensis Sivertsen, 1933
- Alpheus gallicus Scioli & Anker, 2020
- Alpheus georgei Banner & Banner, 1982
- Alpheus glaber (Olivi, 1792)
- Alpheus gracilipes Stimpson, 1860
- Alpheus gracilis Heller, 1861
- Alpheus grahami Abele, 1975

== H ==
- Alpheus haanii Ortmann, 1890
- Alpheus hailstonei Coutière, 1905
- Alpheus halesii Kirk, 1887
- Alpheus hebes Kim & Abele, 1988
- Alpheus heeia Banner & Banner, 1975
- Alpheus hephaestus Bracken-Grissom & Felder, 2014
- Alpheus heronicus Banner & Banner, 1982
- Alpheus heterocarpus (Yu, 1935)
- Alpheus heterochaelis Say, 1818
- Alpheus heurteli Coutière, 1897
- Alpheus hippothoe De Man, 1888
- Alpheus holthuisi Ribeiro, 1964
- Alpheus homochirus (Yu, 1935)
- Alpheus hoonsooi Kim & Abele, 1988
- Alpheus hoplocheles Coutière, 1897
- Alpheus hortensis Wicksten & McClure, 2003
- Alpheus hululensis Coutière, 1905
- Alpheus hutchingsae Banner & Banner, 1982
- Alpheus hyeyoungae Kim & Abele, 1988
- Alpheus hyphalus Chace, 1988

== I ==
- Alpheus idiocheles Coutière, 1905
- Alpheus ikedosoma Komai, 2015
- Alpheus imitatrix De Man, 1909
- Alpheus immaculatus Knowlton & Keller, 1983
- Alpheus inca Wicksten & Méndez G., 1981
- Alpheus inopinatus Holthuis & Gottlieb, 1958
- Alpheus intrinsecus Spence Bate, 1888

== J ==
- Alpheus japonicus Miers, 1879
- Alpheus javieri Anker, Hurt & Knowlton, 2009

== K ==
- Alpheus kagoshimanus Hayashi & Nagata, 2000
- Alpheus karplusi Anker, 2022
- Alpheus kuroshimensis Nomura & Anker, 2005

== L ==
- Alpheus labis Banner & Banner, 1982
- Alpheus lacertosus Kim & Abele, 1988
- Alpheus ladronis Banner, 1956
- Alpheus lanceloti Coutière, 1905
- Alpheus lanceostylus Banner, 1959
- Alpheus lancirostris Rankin, 1900
- Alpheus latus Kim & Abele, 1988
- Alpheus lentiginosus Anker & Nizinski, 2011
- Alpheus lepidus De Man, 1908
- Alpheus leptocheles Banner & Banner, 1975
- Alpheus leptochiroides De Man, 1909
- Alpheus leptochirus Coutière, 1905
- Alpheus leviusculus Dana, 1852
- Alpheus lobidens De Haan, 1849
- Alpheus longecarinatus Hilgendorf, 1879
- Alpheus longichaelis Carvacho, 1979
- Alpheus longiforceps Hayashi & Nagata, 2002
- Alpheus longinquus Kim & Abele, 1988
- Alpheus longipalma Komai & Ohtomi, 2018
- Alpheus lottini Guérin, 1829
- Alpheus luiszapatai Ramos-Tafur, 2018
- Alpheus lutosus Anker & De Grave, 2009

== M ==
- Alpheus macellarius Chace, 1988
- Alpheus macrocheles (Hailstone, 1835)
- Alpheus macrodactylus Ortmann, 1890
- Alpheus macroskeles Alcock & Anderson, 1899
- Alpheus maindroni Coutière, 1898
- Alpheus malabaricus (Fabricius, 1775)
- Alpheus malleator Dana, 1852
- Alpheus malleodigitus (Spence Bate, 1888)
- Alpheus mangalis Anker, 2023
- Alpheus mannarensis Purushothaman, Abhilash, Ajith Kumar & Lal, 2021
- Alpheus margaritae Salgado-Barragán, Ayón-Parente & Zamora-Tavares, 2017
- Alpheus martini Kim & Abele, 1988
- Alpheus mathewsae Anker, 2012
- Alpheus mazatlanicus Wicksten, 1983
- Alpheus microrhynchus De Man, 1897
- Alpheus microscaphis (Banner, 1959)
- Alpheus microstylus (Spence Bate, 1888)
- Alpheus miersi Coutière, 1898
- Alpheus migrans Lewinsohn & Holthuis, 1978
- Alpheus millsae Anker, Hurt & Knowlton, 2007
- Alpheus mitis Dana, 1852
- Alpheus mohammadpouri Dehghani, Sari & Naderloo, 2019
- Alpheus moretensis Banner & Banner, 1982

== N ==
- Alpheus naos Anker, Hurt & Knowlton, 2007
- Alpheus naranjo Anker, 2018
- Alpheus nipa Banner & Banner, 1985
- Alpheus nobili Banner & Banner, 1966
- Alpheus nomurai Anker, 2023
- Alpheus nonalter Kensley, 1969
- Alpheus normanni Kingsley, 1878
- Alpheus notabilis Stebbing, 1915
- Alpheus novaezealandiae Miers, 1876
- Alpheus nuno Anker, 2012
- Alpheus nuttingi (Schmitt, 1924)

== O ==
- Alpheus oahuensis (AH Banner, 1953)
- Alpheus obesomanus Dana, 1852
- Alpheus octocellatus Anker & Benzoni, 2023
- Alpheus ovaliceps Coutière, 1905

== P ==
- Alpheus pachychirus Stimpson, 1860
- Alpheus pacificus Dana, 1852
- Alpheus packardii Kingsley, 1880
- Alpheus paludicola Kemp, 1915
- Alpheus panamensis Kingsley, 1878
- Alpheus papillosus Banner & Banner, 1982
- Alpheus paracrinitus Miers, 1881
- Alpheus paradentipes Coutière, 1905
- Alpheus paraformosus Anker, Hurt & Knowlton, 2008
- Alpheus paralcyone Coutière, 1905
- Alpheus paralpheopsides Coutière, 1905
- Alpheus parasocialis Banner & Banner, 1982
- Alpheus pareuchirus Coutière, 1905
- Alpheus parvimaculatus Nomura & Anker, 2005
- Alpheus parvirostris Dana, 1852
- Alpheus parvus De Man, 1909
- Alpheus peasei (Armstrong, 1940)
- Alpheus percyi Coutière, 1908
- Alpheus perezi Coutière, 1908
- Alpheus perlas Anker & Pachelle, 2019
- Alpheus perplexus Banner, 1956
- Alpheus petronioi Almeida, Terrosi & Mantelatto, 2014
- Alpheus philoctetes De Man, 1909
- Alpheus platycheirus Boone, 1927
- Alpheus platydactylus Coutière, 1897
- Alpheus platyunguiculatus (AH Banner, 1953)
- Alpheus polystictus Knowlton & Keller, 1985
- Alpheus polyxo De Man, 1909
- Alpheus pontederiae de Rochebrune, 1883
- Alpheus pouang Christoffersen, 1979
- Alpheus praedator De Man, 1908
- Alpheus proseuchirus De Man, 1908
- Alpheus pseudopugnax (AH Banner, 1953)
- Alpheus puapeba Christoffersen, 1979
- Alpheus pubescens De Man, 1908
- Alpheus pugnax Dana, 1852
- Alpheus punctatus Anker, 2012
- Alpheus pustulosus Banner & Banner, 1968

== Q ==
- Alpheus quasirapacida Chace, 1988

== R ==
- Alpheus ramosportoae Soledade, Terossi, Scioli, Mantelatto & Almeida, 2019
- Alpheus randalli Banner & Banner, 1980
- Alpheus rapacida De Man, 1908
- Alpheus rapax Fabricius, 1798
- Alpheus rectus Kim & Abele, 1988
- Alpheus ribeiroae Anker & Dworschak, 2004
- Alpheus richardsoni Yaldwyn, 1971
- Alpheus richpalmeri Anker, 2020
- Alpheus roblesi Bracken-Grissom & Felder, 2014
- Alpheus romensky Burukovsky, 1990
- Alpheus roquensis Knowlton & Keller, 1985
- Alpheus roseodigitalis Nomura & Anker, 2005
- Alpheus rostratus Kim & Abele, 1988
- Alpheus rudolphi Almeida & Anker, 2011
- Alpheus rugimanus A. Milne-Edwards, 1878

== S ==
- Alpheus samoa Banner & Banner, 1966
- Alpheus samudra De Grave, Krishnan, Kumar K.P. & Christodoulou, 2020
- Alpheus savuensis De Man, 1908
- Alpheus saxidomus Holthuis, 1980
- Alpheus schmitti Chace, 1972
- Alpheus sciolii Anker, 2022
- Alpheus scopulus Kim & Abele, 1988
- Alpheus serenei Tiwari, 1964
- Alpheus sibogae De Man, 1908
- Alpheus simus Guérin-Méneville, 1855
- Alpheus sizou Banner & Banner, 1967
- Alpheus socialis Heller, 1862
- Alpheus soelae Banner & Banner, 1986
- Alpheus songkla Banner & Banner, 1966
- Alpheus soror Bruce, 1999
- Alpheus spatulatus Banner & Banner, 1968
- Alpheus splendidus Coutière, 1897
- Alpheus spongiarum Coutière, 1897
- Alpheus stanleyi Coutière, 1908
- Alpheus stantoni Banner & Banner, 1986
- Alpheus staphylinus Coutière, 1908
- Alpheus stephensoni Banner & Smalley, 1969
- Alpheus strenuus Dana, 1852
- Alpheus styliceps Coutière, 1905
- Alpheus sudara Banner & Banner, 1966
- Alpheus sulcatus Kingsley, 1878
- Alpheus sulcipalma Purushothaman, Bharathi, Damodhar, Kumar & Lal, 2023
- Alpheus suluensis Chace, 1988
- Alpheus supachai Banner & Banner, 1966
- Alpheus superciliaris Coutière, 1905

== T ==
- Alpheus takla Anker, 2023
- Alpheus talismani Coutière, 1898
- Alpheus tampensis Anker, 2012
- Alpheus tasmanicus Banner & Banner, 1982
- Alpheus tenuicarpus De Man, 1908
- Alpheus tenuipes De Man, 1910
- Alpheus tenuis Kim & Abele, 1988
- Alpheus thomasi Hendrix & Gore, 1973
- Alpheus thompsoni Anker, 2022
- Alpheus tirmiziae Kazmi, 1974
- Alpheus tricolor Anker, 2001
- Alpheus triphopus Nobili, 1906
- Alpheus tungii Banner & Banner, 1966

== U ==
- Alpheus ulalae Bracken-Grissom & Felder, 2014
- Alpheus umbo Kim & Abele, 1988
- Alpheus utriensis Ramos & von Prahl, 1989

== V ==
- Alpheus vanderbilti Boone, 1930
- Alpheus vanuatu Anker, 2020
- Alpheus verrilli (Schmitt, 1924)
- Alpheus villosus (Olivier, 1811)
- Alpheus villus Kim & Abele, 1988
- Alpheus viridari (Armstrong, 1949)
- Alpheus viserion Anker, Leray & Pachelle, 2021
- Alpheus vladivostokiensis (Vinogradov, 1950)

== W ==
- Alpheus waltervadi Kensley, 1969
- Alpheus websteri Kingsley, 1880
- Alpheus wickstenae Christoffersen & Ramos, 1987
- Alpheus williamsi Bruce, 1994
- Alpheus wonkimi Anker & Pachelle, 2013

== X ==
- Alpheus xanthocarpus Anker, Hurt & Knowlton, 2008
- Alpheus xishaensis Liu & Lan, 1980

== Z ==
- Alpheus zarenkovi Anker & Pachelle, 2015
- Alpheus zimmermani Anker, 2007
- Alpheus zulfaquiri Kazmi, 1982
