= Candy stripe =

Candy stripe may refer to:

- Candy stripe fabric
- The Candystripes, nickname for Derry City F.C., an Irish football club based in the city of Derry
- Candystripe, a style of friendship bracelet
- Candy-stripe bamboo, a species within Himalayacalamus, a newly erected genus of mountain clumping bamboos
- Candy-stripe pistol prawn (Alpheus astrinx), a species within Alpheus, a genus of pistol shrimp

== See also ==
- Candy striper, a U.S. hospital volunteer, from the uniform they wear
- Candy Stripers (film), a 1978 pornographic film
- Candystriped allotropa, Allotropa virgata, an achlorophyllous plant in the heather family
