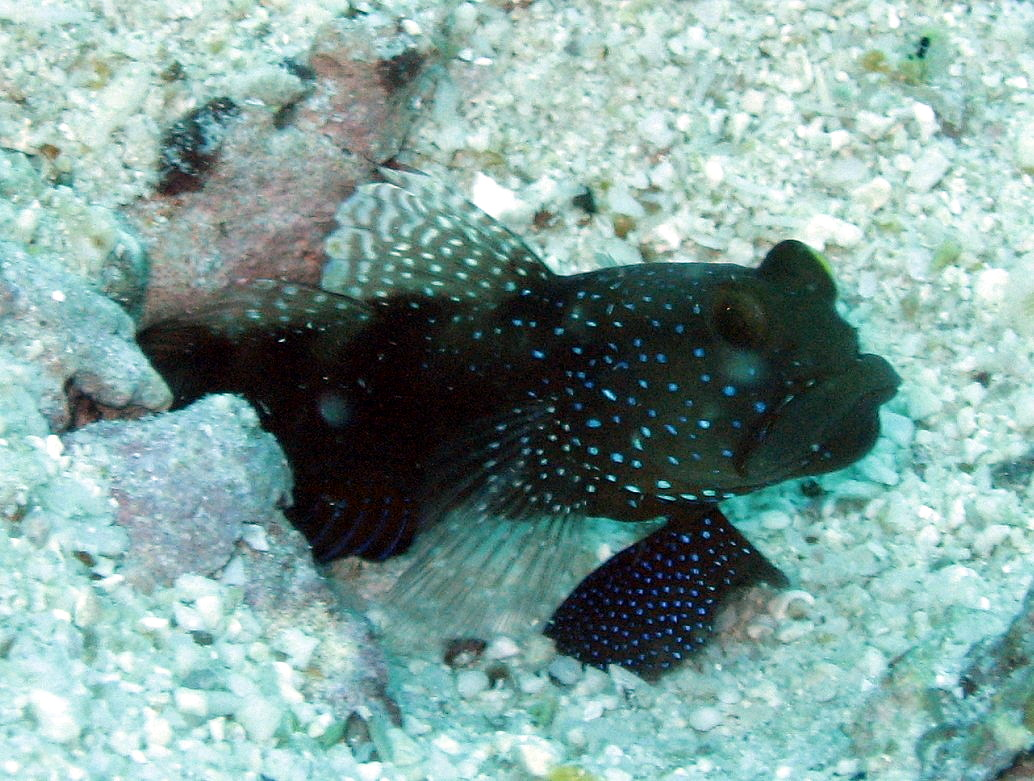

Scientific classification
- Domain: Eukaryota
- Kingdom: Animalia
- Phylum: Chordata
- Class: Actinopterygii
- Order: Gobiiformes
- Family: Gobiidae
- Genus: Cryptocentrus
- Species: C. fasciatus

Binomial name
- Cryptocentrus fasciatus (Playfair (fr), 1867)

Synonyms
- Gobiosoma fasciatum Playfair, 1867

= Y-bar shrimp goby =

Species of fish

The Y-bar shrimpgoby (Cryptocentrus fasciatus) is a species of goby widespread in the Indo-West-Pacific from East Africa to Melanesia and the Great Barrier Reef. This species can be found on reefs at depths of from 5 to 20 metres (16 to 66 ft) where they live in burrows in sandy substrates. They are symbiotic with alpheid shrimps. This species can reach a length of 14 centimetres (5.5 in) TL. It can also be found in the aquarium trade.
