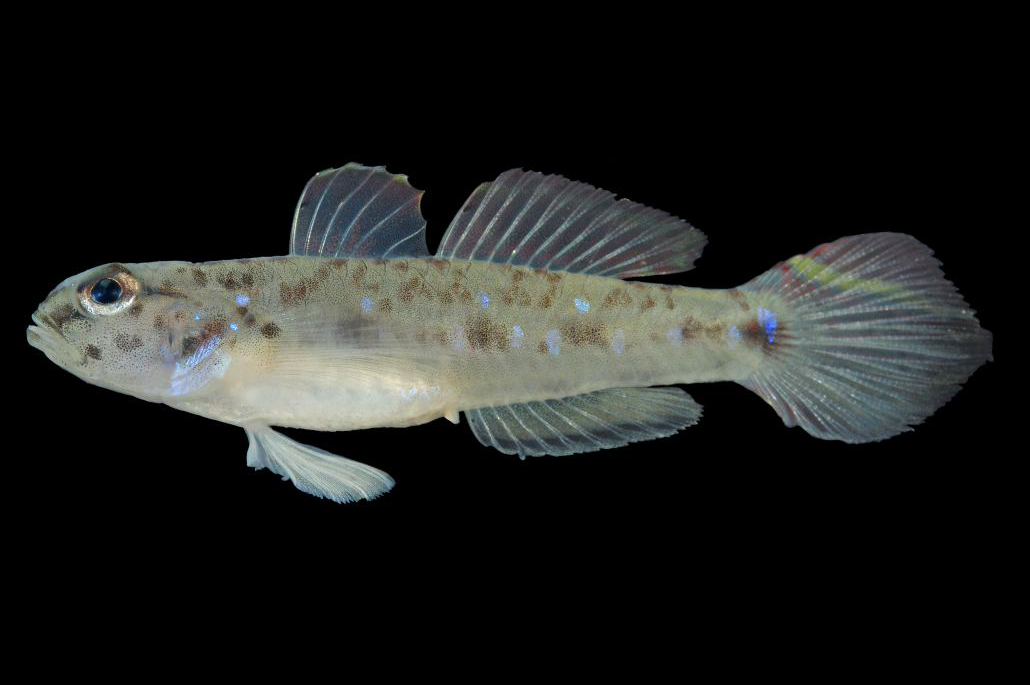

Conservation status
- Least Concern (IUCN 3.1)

Scientific classification
- Kingdom: Animalia
- Phylum: Chordata
- Class: Actinopterygii
- Order: Gobiiformes
- Family: Gobiidae
- Genus: Drombus
- Species: D. globiceps

Binomial name
- Drombus globiceps (Hora, 1923)

Synonyms
- List: Acentrogobius globiceps (Hora, 1923); Acentrogobius kranjiensis (Herre, 1940); Ctenogobious globiceps Hora, 1923; Ctenogobius kranjiensis Herre, 1940; Drombus kranjiensis (Herre, 1940)

= Drombus globiceps =

Species of fish

Drombus globiceps is one of ten species of goby in the genus Drombus. It is found in the western Indo-Pacific. Its common names include Kranji drombus and bighead goby. It is a tropical fish and has been recorded from the Ganges Delta and Chilika Lake of India, the Bay of Bengal, Thailand (Kra Isthmus), Singapore, Indonesia, Papua New Guinea, and the Northern Territory and northern Queensland of Australia. It lives in both marine and fresh water environments. It is considered that D. globiceps is possibly a synonym of Drombus ocyurus. Its conservation threat is categorised as least concern by the IUCN.
