= Cryptocentrus pavoninoides =

Scientific classification
- Kingdom: Animalia
- Phylum: Chordata
- Class: Actinopterygii
- Order: Gobiiformes
- Family: Gobiidae
- Genus: Cryptocentrus
- Species: C. pavoninoides

Binomial name
- Cryptocentrus pavoninoides (Bleeker, 1849)

Synonyms
- Gobius pavoninoides Bleeker, 1849

Species of fish

The bluespotted watchman goby (Cryptocentrus pavoninoides) is a species of goby native to the western central Pacific Ocean where it occurs in coastal waters at depths of from 1 to 15 metres (3.3 to 49.2 ft) forming small colonies on the sea floor. It grows to a length of 15 centimetres (5.9 in) SL.
