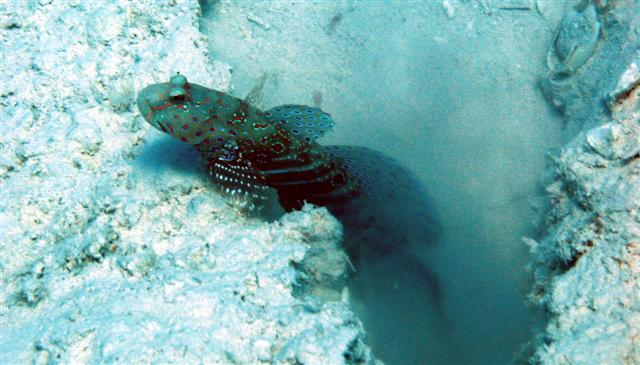

Scientific classification
- Kingdom: Animalia
- Phylum: Chordata
- Class: Actinopterygii
- Order: Gobiiformes
- Family: Gobiidae
- Genus: Cryptocentrus
- Species: C. caeruleopunctatus

Binomial name
- Cryptocentrus caeruleopunctatus (Rüppell, 1830)

Synonyms
- Gobius caeruleopunctatus Rüppell, 1830; Gobius pavoninus Valenciennes, 1837

= Cryptocentrus caeruleopunctatus =

Species of fish

Cryptocentrus caeruleopunctatus, commonly known as the harlequin prawn-goby, is a species of goby. It recently entered the Mediterranean Sea, with large populations observed along the coast of Israel. Before its recording in the Mediterranean this species was restricted to the Red Sea, where it occurs on open sand bottoms of clear water reefs, living in association with alpheid shrimps.
