= Occasional-shrimp goby =

Conservation status
- Data Deficient (IUCN 3.1)

Scientific classification
- Kingdom: Animalia
- Phylum: Chordata
- Class: Actinopterygii
- Order: Gobiiformes
- Family: Gobiidae
- Genus: Drombus
- Species: D. bontii

Binomial name
- Drombus bontii (Bleeker, 1849)

Synonyms
- Acentrogobius bontii (Bleeker, 1849); Gobius bontii Bleeker, 1849; Acentrogobius elberti Popta, 1921; Ctenogobius waigiensis Herre, 1935

Species of fish

Drombus bontii is a species of goby native to the Indian Ocean from the Bazaruto Archipelago of Mozambique through to the tropical waters of the western Pacific Ocean. This species can reach a length of 7.2 centimetres (2.8 in) TL. The status of this species is questionable as the name has been used to describe many populations, that appear to be disparate; Maurice Kottelat considering it to be a junior synonym of Drombus triangularis, or it may even belong to another genus.
