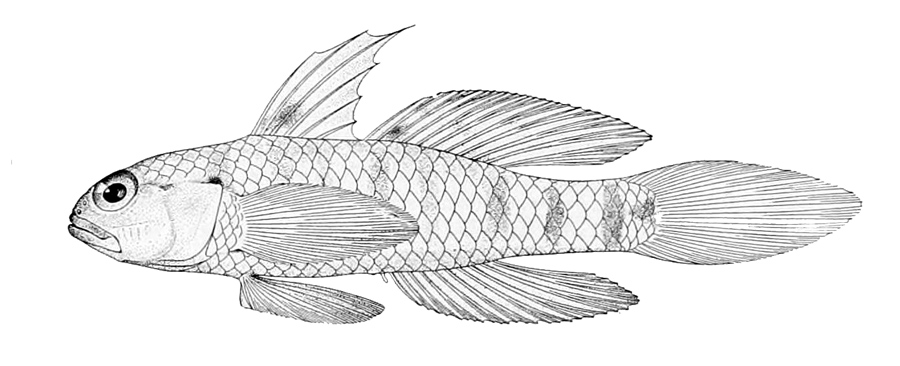
- Drombus ocyurus

Scientific classification
- Kingdom: Animalia
- Phylum: Chordata
- Class: Actinopterygii
- Order: Gobiiformes
- Family: Gobiidae
- Genus: Drombus; D. S. Jordan & Seale, 1905

Type species
- Drombus palackyi D. S. Jordan & Seale, 1905

= Drombus =

Genus of fishes

Drombus is a genus of gobies native to fresh, brackish and marine waters of the Indian Ocean and the western Pacific Ocean.

== Species ==
There are currently 10 recognized species in this genus:

- Drombus bontii (Bleeker, 1849) (Occasional-shrimp goby)
- Drombus dentifer (Hora, 1923) (Yellow drombus)
- Drombus globiceps (Hora, 1923) (Kranji drombus)
- Drombus halei Whitley, 1935 (Hale's drombus)
- Drombus key (J. L. B. Smith, 1947) (Key goby)
- Drombus lepidothorax Whitley, 1945 (White-edge drombus)
- Drombus ocyurus (D. S. Jordan & Seale, 1907) (Bluemarked drombus)
- Drombus palackyi D. S. Jordan & Seale, 1905
- Drombus simulus (J. L. B. Smith, 1960) (Pinafore goby)
- Drombus triangularis (M. C. W. Weber, 1909) (Brown drombus)
- Drombus thackerae Carolin, Bajpai, Maurya & Schwarzhans, 2022 (otolith based fossil species)

Drombus kranjiensis (originally described as Ctenogobius kranjiensis) and Drombus whitleyi are now regarded as junior synonyms of Drombus globiceps and Bathygobius fuscus, respectively. Drombus clarki, Drombus irrasus, Drombus maculipinnis, Drombus plumatus, and Drombus tutuilae have been transferred to the genus Callogobius. D. bontii is treated as a synonym of Gobius bontii by FishBase.
