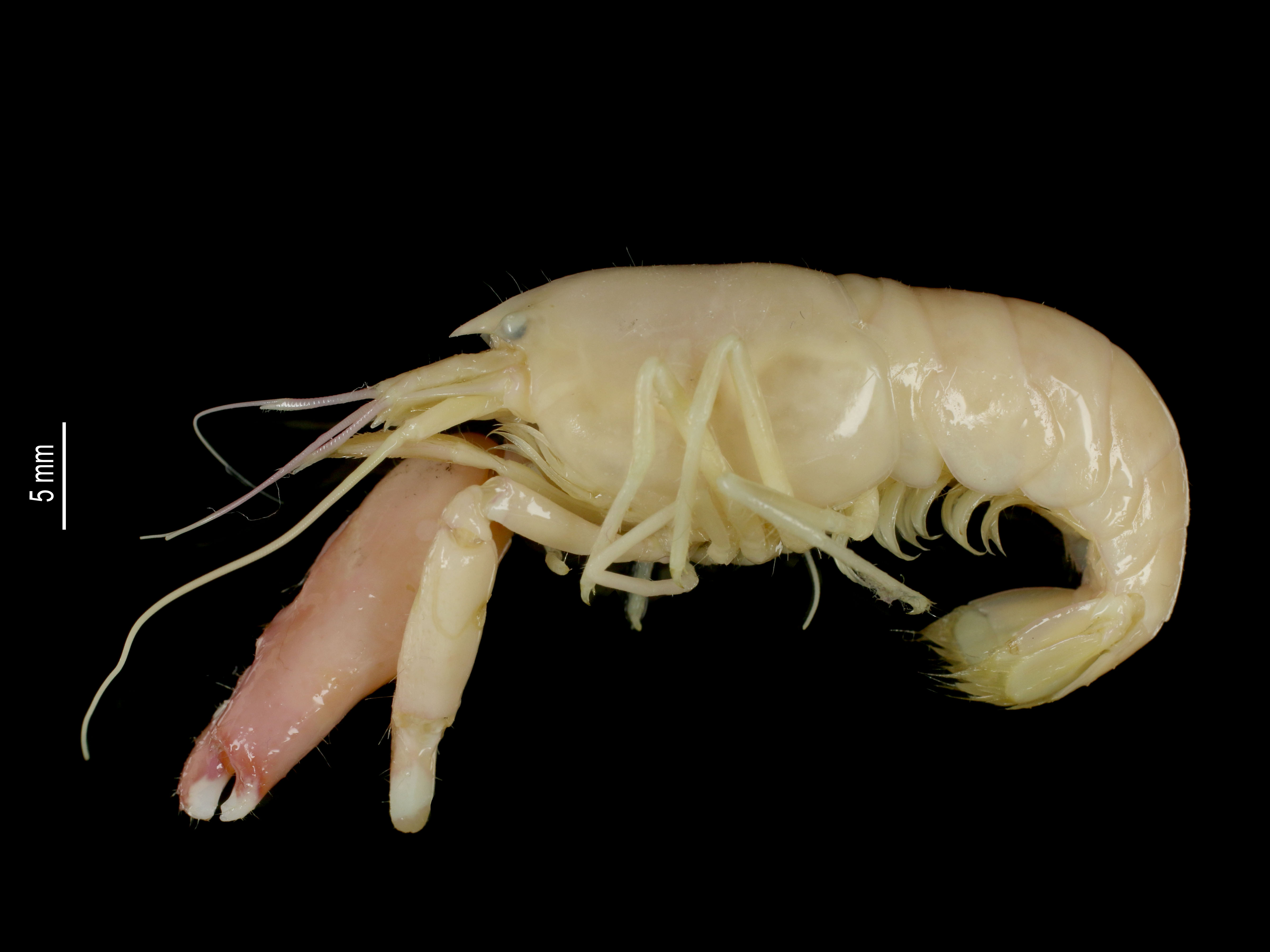
- PRESERVED_SPECIMEN; Alpheus fasqueli Anker, 2001; Type status: HOLOTYPE; Identified by: Anker A

Scientific classification
- Kingdom: Animalia
- Phylum: Arthropoda
- Clade: Pancrustacea
- Class: Malacostraca
- Order: Decapoda
- Suborder: Pleocyemata
- Infraorder: Caridea
- Family: Alpheidae
- Genus: Alpheus
- Species: A. fasqueli

Binomial name
- Alpheus fasqueli Anker, 2001

= Alpheus fasqueli =

Species of crustacean

Alpheus fasqueli is a crustacean belonging to the family of snapping shrimp. It was first isolated in Sri Lanka. It counts with a setose carapace, an acute and carinate rostrum, and unarmed orbital hoods. Its basicerite has a strong ventrolateral tooth. The lamella of its scaphocerite is not reduced. Its third maxilliped counts with an epipodial plate bearing thick setae, while its first chelipeds are found with their merus bearing a strong disto-mesial tooth; its third pereiopod has an armed ischium, with a simple and conical dactylus. Its telson is broad, distally tapering, with 2 pairs of dorsal spines. The species is named after Frédéric Fasquel, a photographer who contributed rare shrimp specimens for the Muséum national d'histoire naturelle.

== Description ==
Alpheus fasqueli has a carapace length of about 17.5 millimetres (0.69 in), a total length of 44 millimetres (1.7 in) and chela length of 22 millimetres (0.87 in). Its carapace is smooth, possessing shallow grooves latero-anteriorly, and scattered setae dorsally. Its pterygostomial angle is rounded, while its rostrum is well developed and descendant; its orbital hoods are inflated, lacking teeth. Its corneas are well developed, while its eyes have small anterior processes, and its antennular peduncles are stout.

Its antenna shows a basicerite bearing an acute, ventrolateral tooth. Its mouthparts are the same as for Alpheus tricolor: its incisor process bearing less than 10 teeth. The epipodial plate on the coxa of its third maxilliped bears thick, blunt setae.

Its merus is slightly crenellated on the mesial margin, and contains no teeth. Its carpus is very short. Its uropodal exopod has a moderately developed lateral spine, and a sinuous diaresis. The species' telson is broad, distally tapering, exhibiting 2 pairs of dorsal spines.

=== Coloration ===
Its carapace is coloured bright red, with circular and elongated whitish patches. Its rostrum is red and its orbital hoods transparent. The antennal and antennular peduncles are reddish, while both flagella are purplish red. Its major and minor chelipeds are red; the merus showing a distal white patch; chelae are deep red, white on the tips of fingers. The species' abdomen is red, and the pleura exhibiting a bordeaux red colour ventrally. Its uropods are red, as is its telson.

== See also ==
- Decapod anatomy
