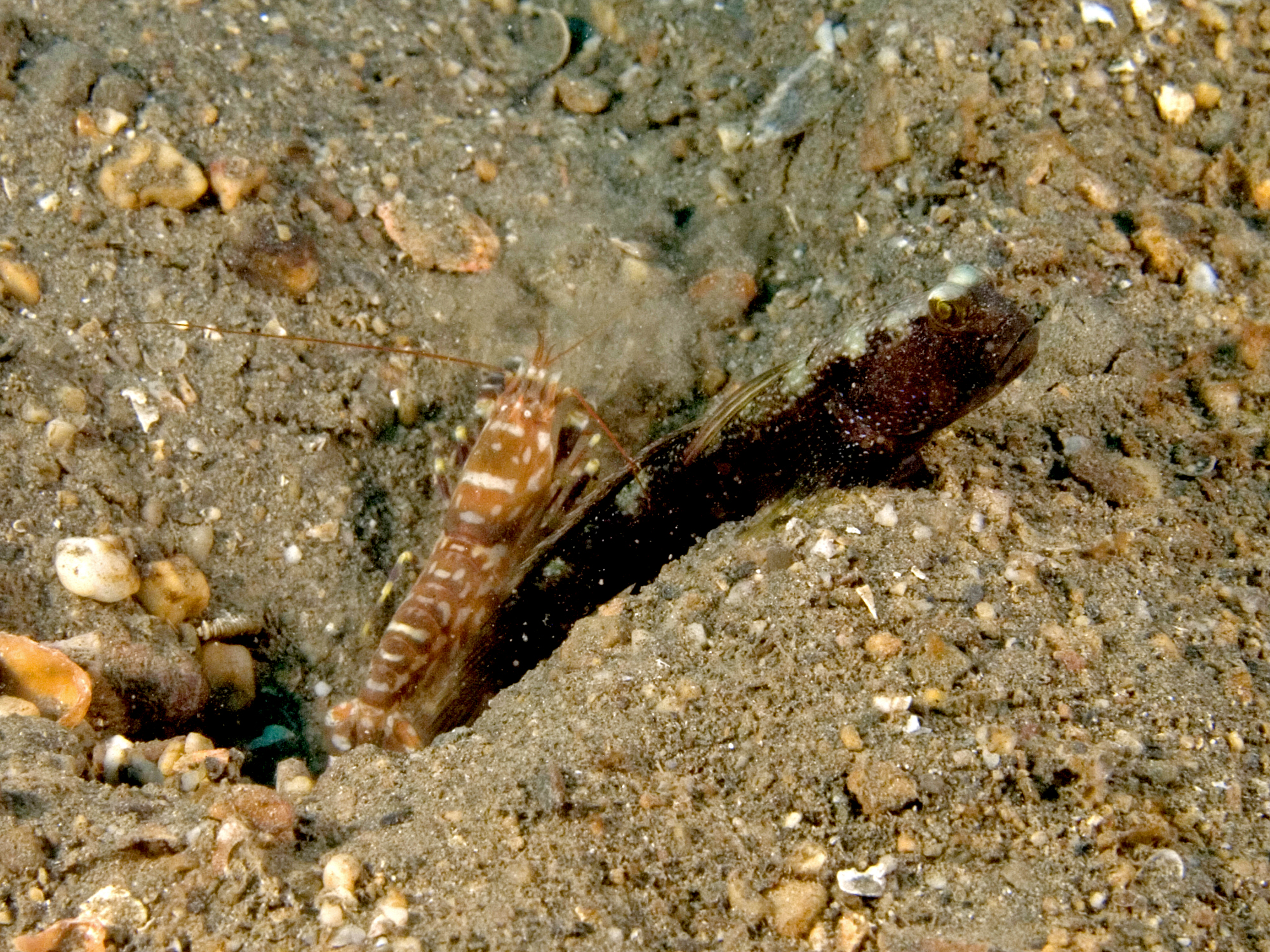
- Alpheus rapacida and Cryptocentrus strigilliceps

Scientific classification
- Kingdom: Animalia
- Phylum: Arthropoda
- Clade: Pancrustacea
- Class: Malacostraca
- Order: Decapoda
- Suborder: Pleocyemata
- Infraorder: Caridea
- Family: Alpheidae
- Genus: Alpheus
- Species: A. rapacida

Binomial name
- Alpheus rapacida De Man, 1908

= Alpheus rapacida =

Species of crustacean

Alpheus rapacida is a species of snapping shrimp of the family Alpheidae. It is found at depths of up to 56 metres (184 ft) across the Indo-West Pacific, with a few recent observations from the Mediterranean coasts of Israel and Turkey as a Lessepsian migrant.
