= Drombus halei =

- llustration of the holotype of Hale's Drombus, Drombus halei

Conservation status
- Least Concern (IUCN 3.1)

Scientific classification
- Kingdom: Animalia
- Phylum: Chordata
- Class: Actinopterygii
- Order: Gobiiformes
- Family: Gobiidae
- Genus: Drombus
- Species: D. halei

Binomial name
- Drombus halei Whitley, 1935

Species of fish

Drombus halei, Hale's drombus, is a species of ray-finned fish from the family Gobiidae. It is found in the warmer waters of Australia from Shark Bay, Western Australia, to Shoalwater Bay, Queensland. where it occurs around shallow inshore rocky and coral-rock reefs, where there are areas which have sea beds consisting of sand, rubble and sandy-mud, it can also sometimes be found in estuaries and near mangroves. The specific name honours Herbert M. Hale (1895-1963) who was Director of the South Australian Museum.
