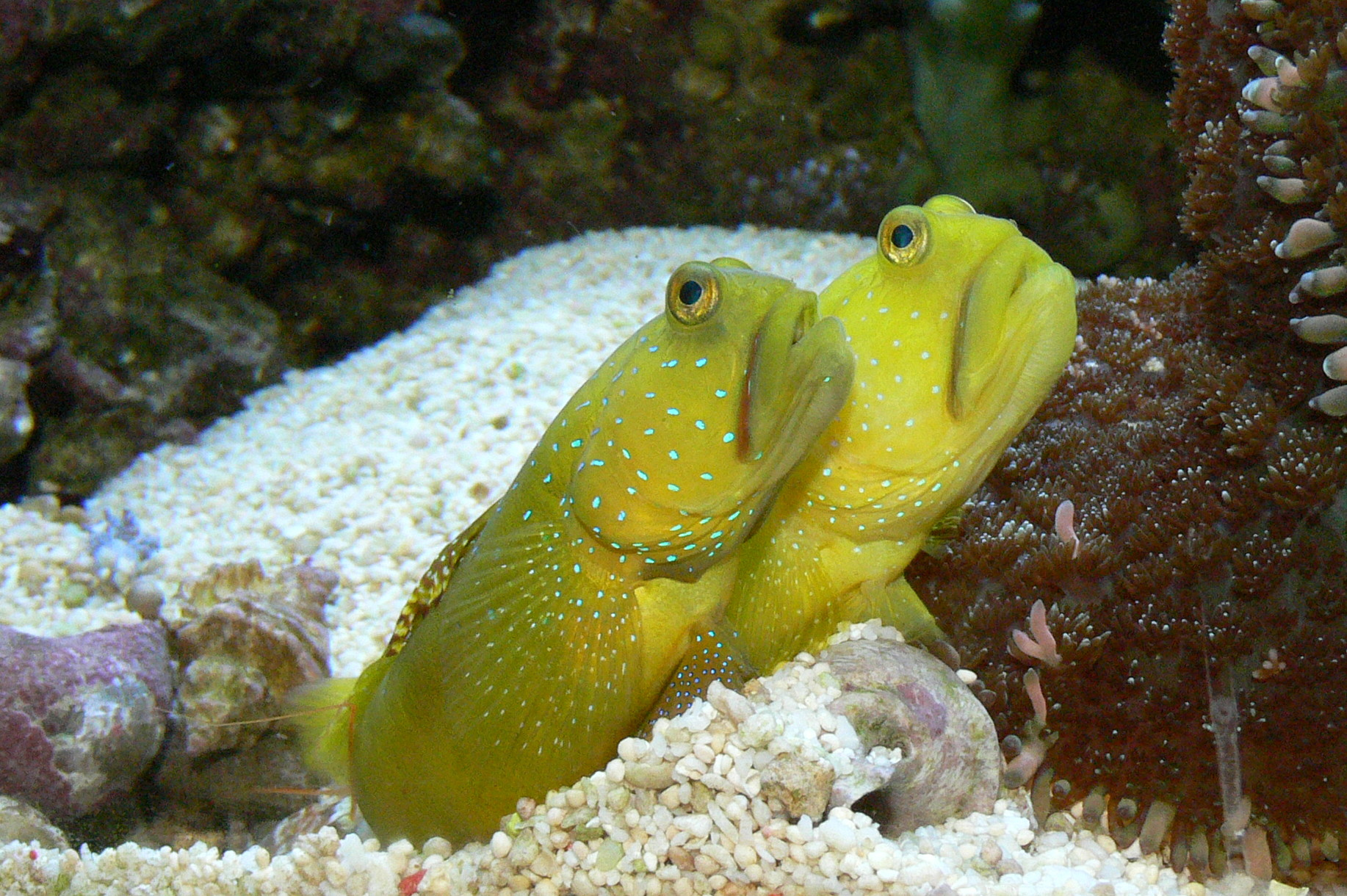

Conservation status
- Least Concern (IUCN 3.1)

Scientific classification
- Kingdom: Animalia
- Phylum: Chordata
- Class: Actinopterygii
- Order: Gobiiformes
- Family: Gobiidae
- Genus: Cryptocentrus
- Species: C. cinctus

Binomial name
- Cryptocentrus cinctus (Herre, 1936)

Synonyms
- Smilogobius cinctus Herre, 1936

= Yellow prawn-goby =

Species of fish

The yellow prawn-goby (Cryptocentrus cinctus) is a species of goby native to the Western Pacific, where it can be found at depths of from 1 to 25 metres (3.3 to 82.0 ft) in coastal bays and lagoons. This species is symbiotic with alpheid shrimps. They share burrows with these shrimp. The species can reach a length of 10 centimetres (3.9 in) SL. These fish vary greatly in appearance, ranging from brilliant yellow to gray and even brown forms or combinations of each coloring. This species is often kept in salt water aquariums. The yellow prawn-goby can be kept in aquariums as small as 20 gallons (75 L). In the marine hobby they are often partnered with tiger pistol shrimp.
