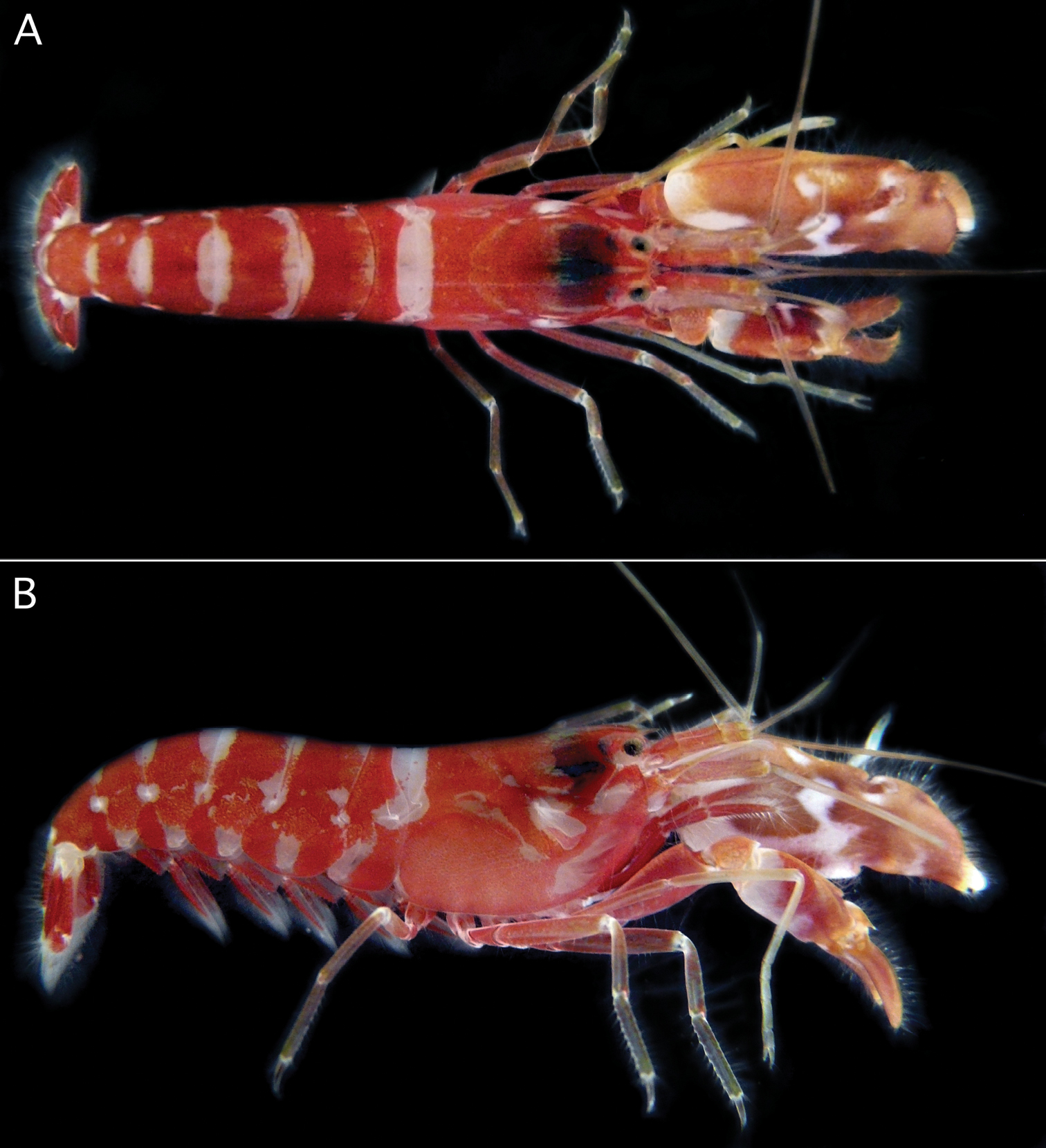
- A male holotype of Alpheus cedrici captured from Ascension Island.

Scientific classification
- Kingdom: Animalia
- Phylum: Arthropoda
- Clade: Pancrustacea
- Class: Malacostraca
- Order: Decapoda
- Suborder: Pleocyemata
- Infraorder: Caridea
- Family: Alpheidae
- Genus: Alpheus
- Species: A. cedrici

Binomial name
- Alpheus cedrici Anker & De Grave, 2012

= Alpheus cedrici =

Species of shrimp

Alpheus cedrici is a species of shrimp that belongs to the family Alpheidae (snapping shrimps) It can be found in the Southern and Central Atlantic Ocean around the Islands of St. Helena and Ascension.

== Description ==
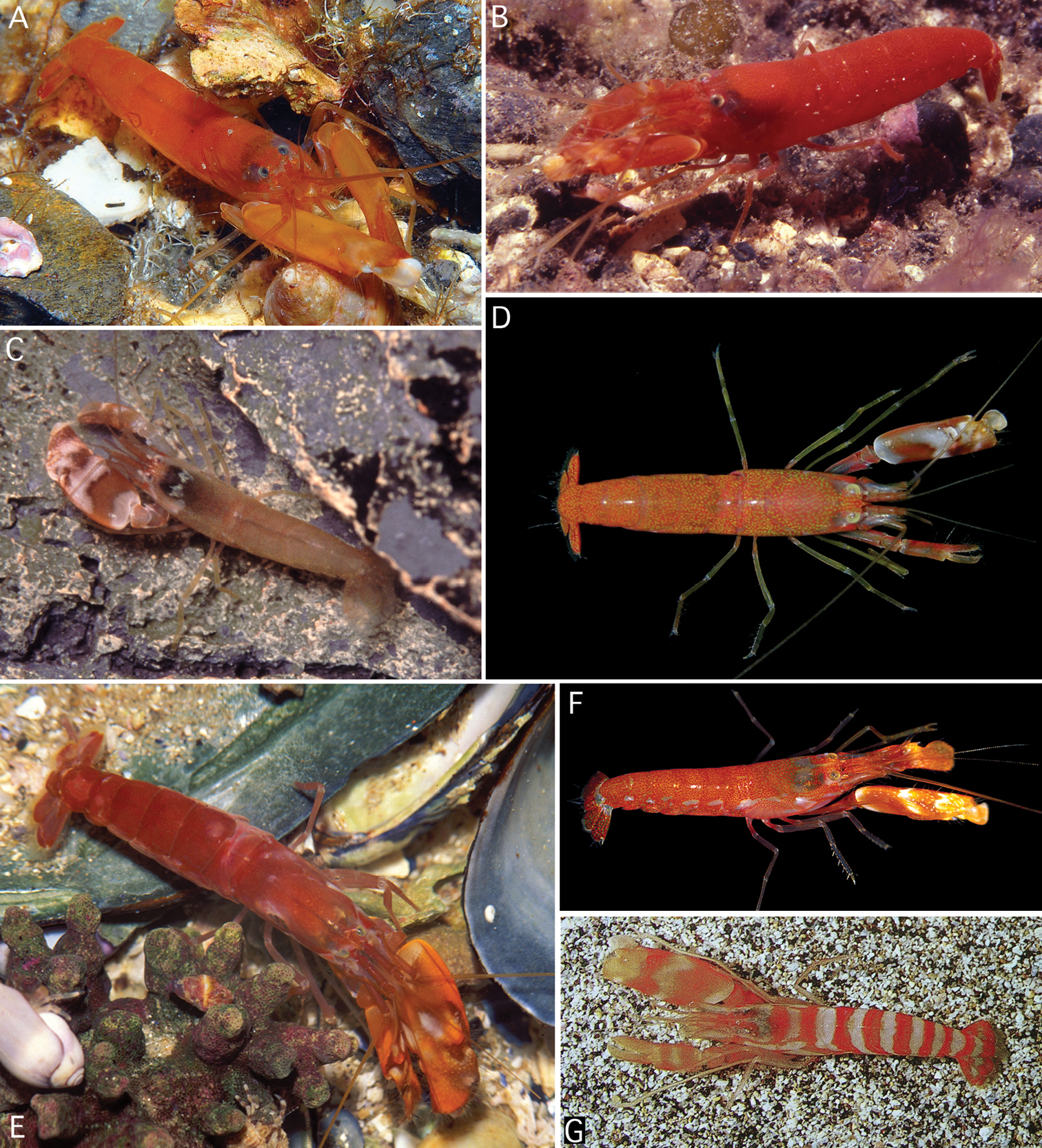
Image showing the color pattern of members of the Alpheus macrocheles species complex. (A) A. macrocheles, (B) A. macrocheles, (C) A. amblyonyx, (D) A. amblyonyx (E), A. bellimanus, (F) A. bellimanus and (G) an unknown species

Compared to other members of the genus Alpheus, it is a medium-sized species with males growing to a length of 10.1 mm and females growing to a length of 11.8 mm. The body is bright red or a red-orange ground color. White bands can be seen along the posterior margin and colourless or whitish areas are located on the flanks.

== Phylogeny ==
This species belongs to the Alpheus macrocheles species complex. Phylogenetic analysis show that this species is most related to Alpheus macrocheles, Alpheus amblyonyx, Alpheus bellimanus and Alpheus rectus.

== Discovery ==
The specimens used to describe this species were collected while scuba diving expedition in April of 2008 off the coast of the Ascension Island in the central Atlantic Ocean. The holotype, OUMNH.ZC.2008-11-0017, is a male and it was found off the west side of the English Bay.

=== Etymology ===
This species was named after Dr. Cedric d'Udekem d'Acoz. This is in recognization of his contribution to the taxonomy of caridean shrimp and other decapods, particularly those located in the Atlantic Ocean.
