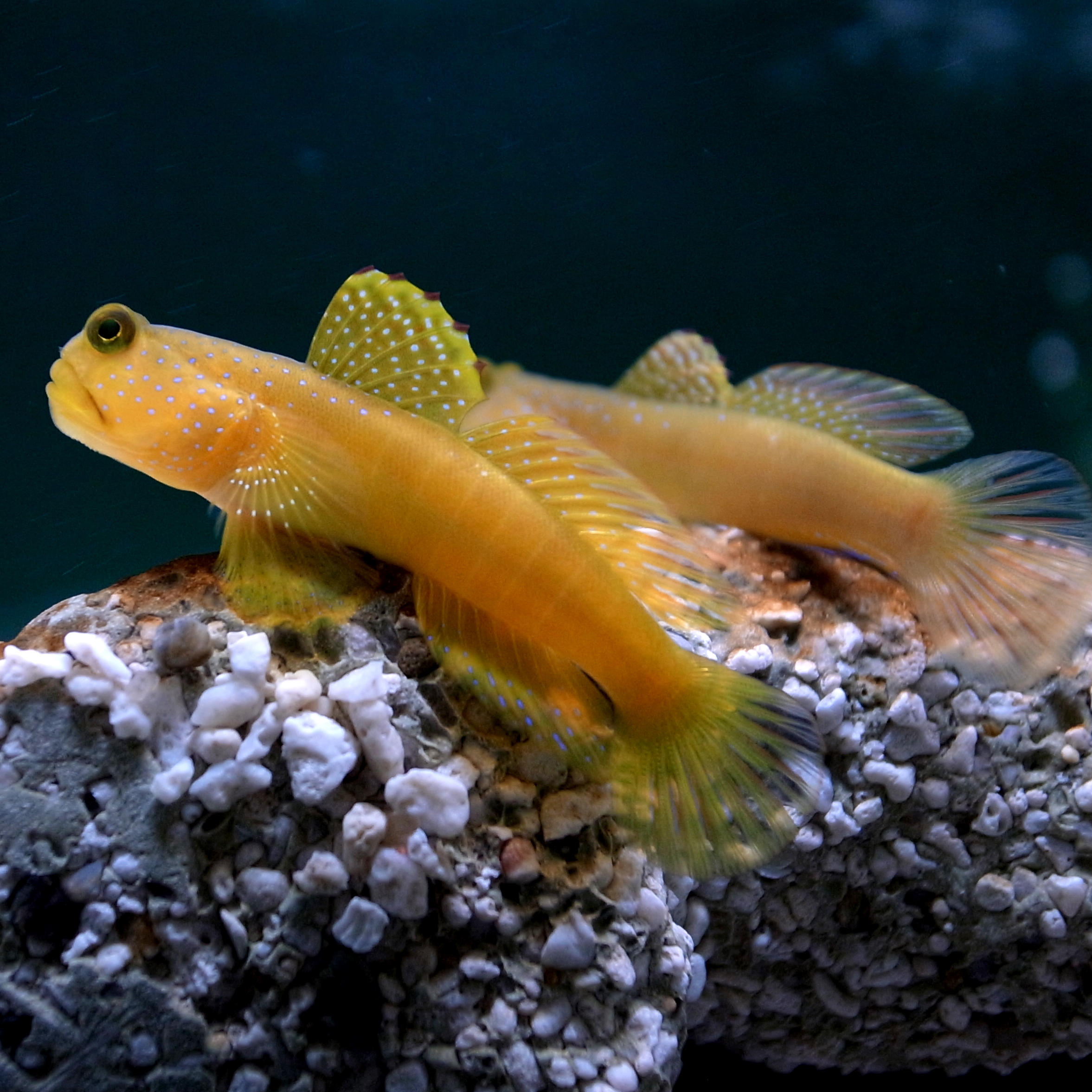
- Cryptocentrus cinctus

Scientific classification
- Kingdom: Animalia
- Phylum: Chordata
- Class: Actinopterygii
- Division: Teleostei
- Order: Gobiiformes
- Family: Gobiidae
- Subfamily: Gobiinae
- Genus: Cryptocentrus; Valenciennes, 1837

Type species
- Gobius cryptocentrus Valenciennes, 1837

Synonyms
- Alepidogobius Bleeker, 1874; Batman Whitley, 1956; Iotogobius Smith, 1959; Mars Jordan & Seale, 1906; Obtortiophagus Whitley, 1933; Smilogobius Herre, 1934

= Cryptocentrus =

Genus of fishes

Cryptocentrus, also known as Watchman gobies, and one of the genera known as shrimp gobies or prawn gobies, is a genus of gobies native to tropical marine waters of the Indian and Pacific oceans.

== Species ==
There are currently 41 recognized species in this genus:

- Cryptocentrus albidorsus (Yanagisawa, 1978) (White-backed shrimpgoby)
- Cryptocentrus altipinna Hoese, 2019
- Cryptocentrus bulbiceps (Whitley, 1953) (Bluelined shrimpgoby)
- Cryptocentrus caeruleomaculatus (Herre, 1933) (Blue-speckled prawn-goby)
- Cryptocentrus caeruleopunctatus (Rüppell, 1830) (Harlequin prawn-goby)
- Cryptocentrus callopterus H. M. Smith, 1945
- Cryptocentrus cebuanus Herre, 1927 (Cebu shrimpgoby)
- Cryptocentrus cinctus (Herre, 1936) (Yellow prawn-goby)
- Cryptocentrus cryptocentrus (Valenciennes, 1837) (Ninebar prawn-goby)
- Cryptocentrus cyanospilotus G. R. Allen & J. E. Randall, 2011 (Bluespot shrimpgoby)
- Cryptocentrus cyanotaenia (Bleeker, 1853) (Lagoon shrimpgoby)
- Cryptocentrus diproctotaenia Bleeker, 1876
- Cryptocentrus epakros G. R. Allen, 2015 (Pointedfin shrimpgoby)
- Cryptocentrus fasciatus (Playfair (fr), 1867) (Y-bar shrimpgoby)
- Cryptocentrus flavus Yanagisawa, 1978
- Cryptocentrus haydeni (Herre, 1936)
- Cryptocentrus inexplicatus (Herre, 1934) (Inexplicable shrimpgoby)
- Cryptocentrus insignitus (Whitley, 1956) (Signal goby)
- Cryptocentrus leonis H. M. Smith, 1931
- Cryptocentrus leptocephalus Bleeker, 1876 (Pink-speckled shrimpgoby)
- Cryptocentrus leucostictus (Günther, 1872) (Saddled prawn-goby)
- Cryptocentrus liolepis Bleeker, 1876
- Cryptocentrus lutheri Klausewitz, 1960 (Luther's prawn-goby)
- Cryptocentrus malindiensis (J. L. B. Smith, 1959)
- Cryptocentrus maudae Fowler, 1937 (Maude's shrimpgoby)
- Cryptocentrus melanopus (Bleeker, 1860)
- Cryptocentrus multicinctus G. R. Allen & J. E. Randall, 2011 (Multibarred shrimpgoby)
- Cryptocentrus nanus Greenfield & Allen, 2018
- Cryptocentrus nigrocellatus (Yanagisawa, 1978)
- Cryptocentrus niveatus (Valenciennes, 1837)
- Cryptocentrus pavoninoides (Bleeker, 1849)
- Cryptocentrus pretiosus (Rendahl (de), 1924)
- Cryptocentrus sericus Herre, 1932
- Cryptocentrus shigensis N. Kuroda, 1956 (Shige shrimpgoby)
- Cryptocentrus steinhardti Goren & Stern, 2021
- Cryptocentrus strigilliceps (D. S. Jordan & Seale, 1906) (Target shrimpgoby)
- Cryptocentrus taiwanensis Chen & Yang, 2024
- Cryptocentrus tentaculatus Hoese & Larson, 2004 (Tentacle shrimpgoby)
- Cryptocentrus venustus Seale, 1914
- Cryptocentrus wehrlei Fowler, 1937
- Cryptocentrus yatsui Tomiyama, 1936
