= Cryptocentrus leonis =

Conservation status
- Data Deficient (IUCN 3.1)

Scientific classification
- Kingdom: Animalia
- Phylum: Chordata
- Class: Actinopterygii
- Order: Gobiiformes
- Family: Gobiidae
- Genus: Cryptocentrus
- Species: C. leonis

Binomial name
- Cryptocentrus leonis H. M. Smith, 1931

Species of fish

Cryptocentrus leonis is a species of goby native to marine and brackish waters along the shores of the Gulf of Thailand.
