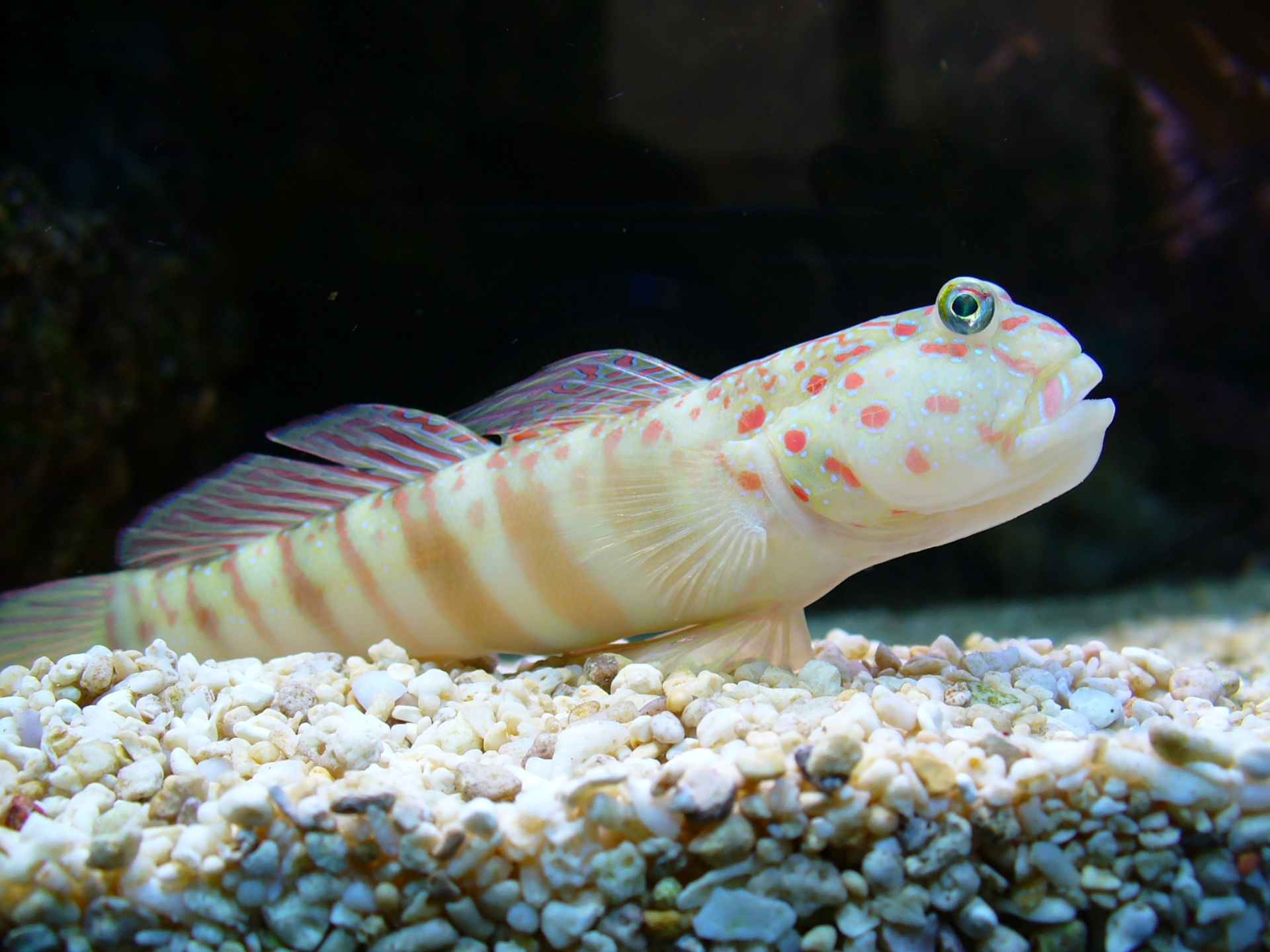

Scientific classification
- Kingdom: Animalia
- Phylum: Chordata
- Class: Actinopterygii
- Order: Gobiiformes
- Family: Gobiidae
- Genus: Cryptocentrus
- Species: C. leptocephalus

Binomial name
- Cryptocentrus leptocephalus (Bleeker, 1876)

Synonyms
- Gobius melanopus Bleeker, 1860; Cryptocentrus melanopus (Bleeker, 1860); Smilogobius obliquus Herre, 1934; Cryptocentrus obliquus (Herre, 1934)

= Pink-speckled shrimpgoby =

Species of fish

The pink-speckled shrimpgoby (Cryptocentrus leptocephalus) is a species of goby native to the western Pacific Ocean where it occurs on silty substrates in coastal reefs, lagoons, mangrove swamps and tide pools. It grows to a length of 12 centimetres (4.7 in) SL.
