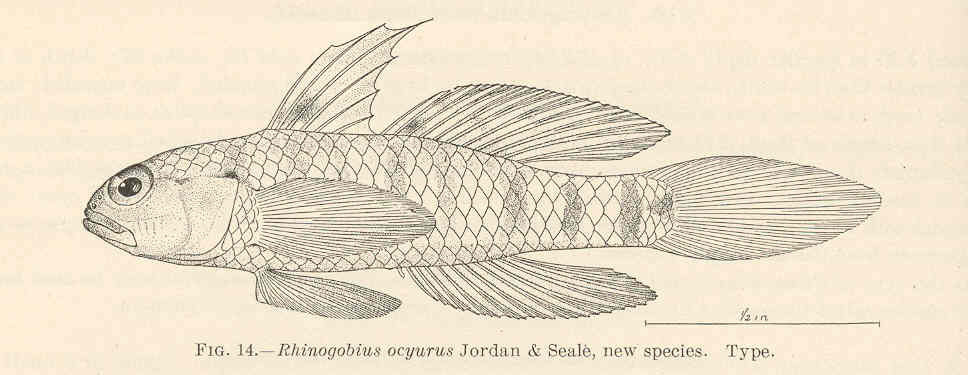

Conservation status
- Least Concern (IUCN 3.1)

Scientific classification
- Kingdom: Animalia
- Phylum: Chordata
- Class: Actinopterygii
- Order: Gobiiformes
- Family: Gobiidae
- Genus: Drombus
- Species: D. ocyurus

Binomial name
- Drombus ocyurus Jordan & Seale, 1907

= Bluemarked drombus =

Species of ray-finned fish

The bluemarked drombus (Drombus ocyurus) is a species of fish in the family Gobiidae. The species Drombus globiceps is possibly a synonym of this species.

== Distribution ==
The bluemarked drombus is found in the Eastern Indian and Western Pacific Oceans, from the Andaman Sea and Malaysia to the Philippines, Japanese Ryukyu Islands and northern Australia. It is found in several countries, including Australia, Brunei, China, Japan, Taiwan, Thailand, the Philippines, Malaysia and Vietnam.

== Behaviour ==
The bluemarked drombus is known to have a symbiotic relationship with pistol shrimps, especially with the species Alpheus richardsoni. In the relationship, the animals dig a hole and the goby keeps watch for any potential predators while the pistol shrimp would fight them off.

== Diet ==
The bluemarked drombus is a carnivorous bottom-dweller that mainly feeds on small animals, such as crustaceans and worms.

== Size and appearance ==
The bluemarked drombus has a robust and compressed body with a large head. The caudal fin is long and pointed in the middle and it has ctenoid scales covering the body all the way until the beginning of the first dorsal fin. The head has no scales at all. It usually reaches around 5-6 centimetres.

== Conservation status ==
The bluemarked drombus is given the status of Least Concern by the IUCN Red List. However, it faces several threats, including the development of housing and urban areas and domestic and urban waste water pollution.
