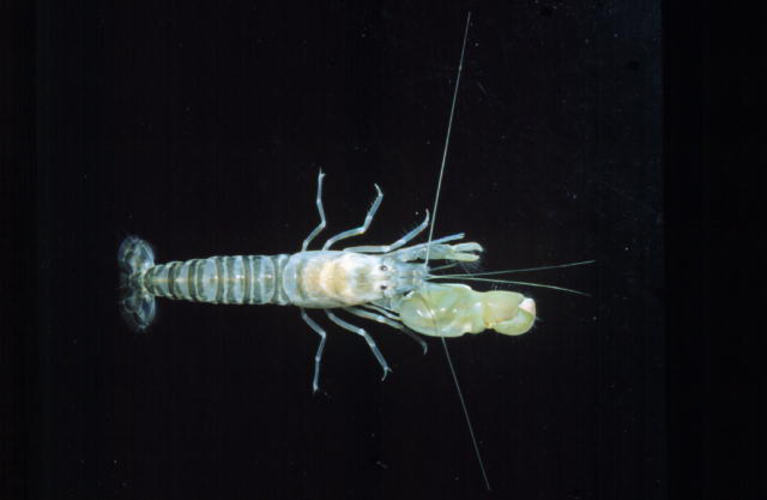

Scientific classification
- Kingdom: Animalia
- Phylum: Arthropoda
- Clade: Pancrustacea
- Class: Malacostraca
- Order: Decapoda
- Suborder: Pleocyemata
- Infraorder: Caridea
- Family: Alpheidae
- Genus: Alpheus
- Species: A. richardsoni

Binomial name
- Alpheus richardsoni Yaldwyn, 1971

= Alpheus richardsoni =

Species of shrimp from the Pacific Ocean

Alpheus richardsoni, commonly known as Richardson's snapping shrimp, is a species of shrimp in the family Alpheidae.

== Distribution ==
Richardson's snapping shrimp is primarily found in the South Pacific, in Australia (including Tasmania), New Zealand and several Pacific Islands as well.

== Habitat and behaviour ==
Richardson's snapping shrimp likes to live in reef and seaweed areas, at depths of up to 25 metres. They use their large claw to make a loud noise which stuns their prey underwater. Richardson's Snapping Shrimp is known to have a symbiotic relationship with gobies, especially the species Drombus ocyurus. In this relationship, the animals dig a hole and the goby keeps watch for any potential predators and the shrimp protects the goby.

== Diet ==
Richardson's snapping shrimp feeds on organic detritus and small invertebrates, which it hunts by stunning them with its claw.

== Size and appearance ==
Richardson's snapping shrimp has a dark green-brown body that is covered in lots of small red spots. One of its claws is much bigger than the other, a common feature in Alpheidae shrimp. It gets up to 6 centimetres long.
