= Mottled snapping prawn =

Scientific classification
- Domain: Eukaryota
- Kingdom: Animalia
- Phylum: Arthropoda
- Class: Malacostraca
- Order: Decapoda
- Suborder: Pleocyemata
- Infraorder: Caridea
- Family: Alpheidae
- Genus: Alpheus
- Species: A. bidens

Binomial name
- Alpheus bidens (Olivier, 1811)

Synonyms
- Palaemon bidens Olivier, 1811; Alpheus tridentatus Zehntner, 1894; Alpheus dissodontonotus Stebbing, 1915

Species of crustacean

The mottled snapping prawn (Alpheus bidens) is a species of snapping shrimp found in the Indo-West Pacific oceans.
