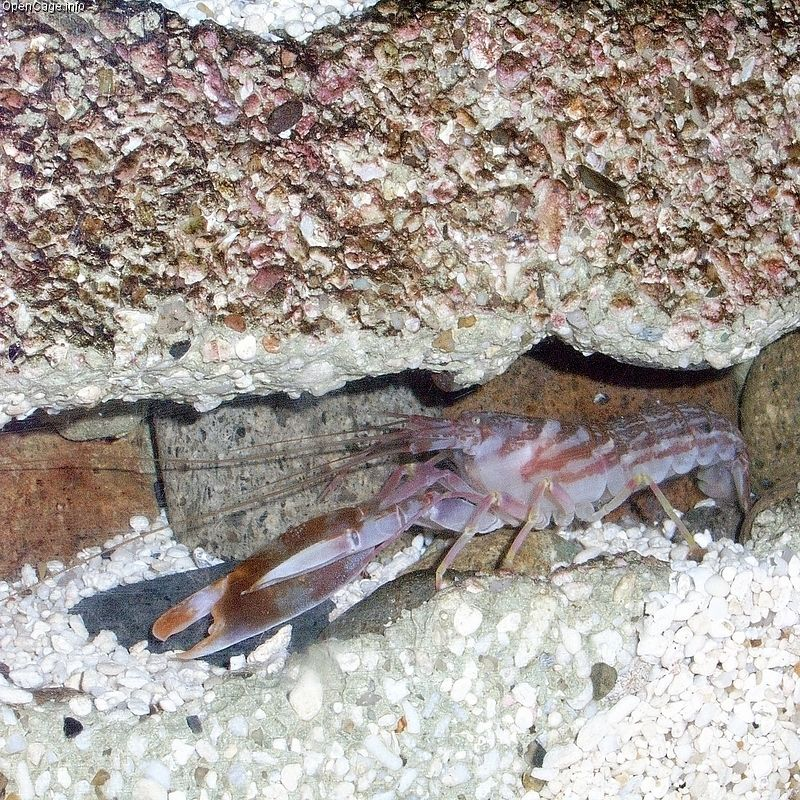
- Alpheus digitalis

Scientific classification
- Kingdom: Animalia
- Phylum: Arthropoda
- Clade: Pancrustacea
- Class: Malacostraca
- Order: Decapoda
- Suborder: Pleocyemata
- Infraorder: Caridea
- Family: Alpheidae
- Genus: Alpheus; Fabricius, 1798

Type species
- Alpheus avarus Fabricius, 1798 (nomen dubium)

Species
- See species list

Synonyms
- List: Alphaeus Fabricus, 1798; Alpheoides Paulson, 1875; Alphous Fabricius, 1798; Asphalius Roux, 1831; Autonomaea Risso, 1816; Autonomea Risso, 1816; Crangon Weber, 1795 (preoccupied); Cryptophthalmus Rafinesque, 1814; Dienecia Westwood, 1835; Halopsyche de Saussure, 1857; Nauplius Risso, 1844; Paralpheus Spence Bate, 1888; Phleusa Nardo, 1847; Thunor Armstrong, 1949

= Alpheus (crustacean) =

Genus of crustaceans

Alpheus is a genus of snapping shrimp of the family Alpheidae. This genus contains in excess of 330 species, making this the most species-rich genus of shrimp, although the genus is unlikely to be a natural grouping (monophyletic) as phylogenetic analyses have recovered other alpheid genera within this genus.

Like other snapping shrimp, the claws of Alpheus are asymmetrical, with one of the claws enlarged for making a popping noise. Some species in the genus have symbiotic relationships with gobiid fishes, others with sea anemones, echiurans, and sponges.

== Species ==
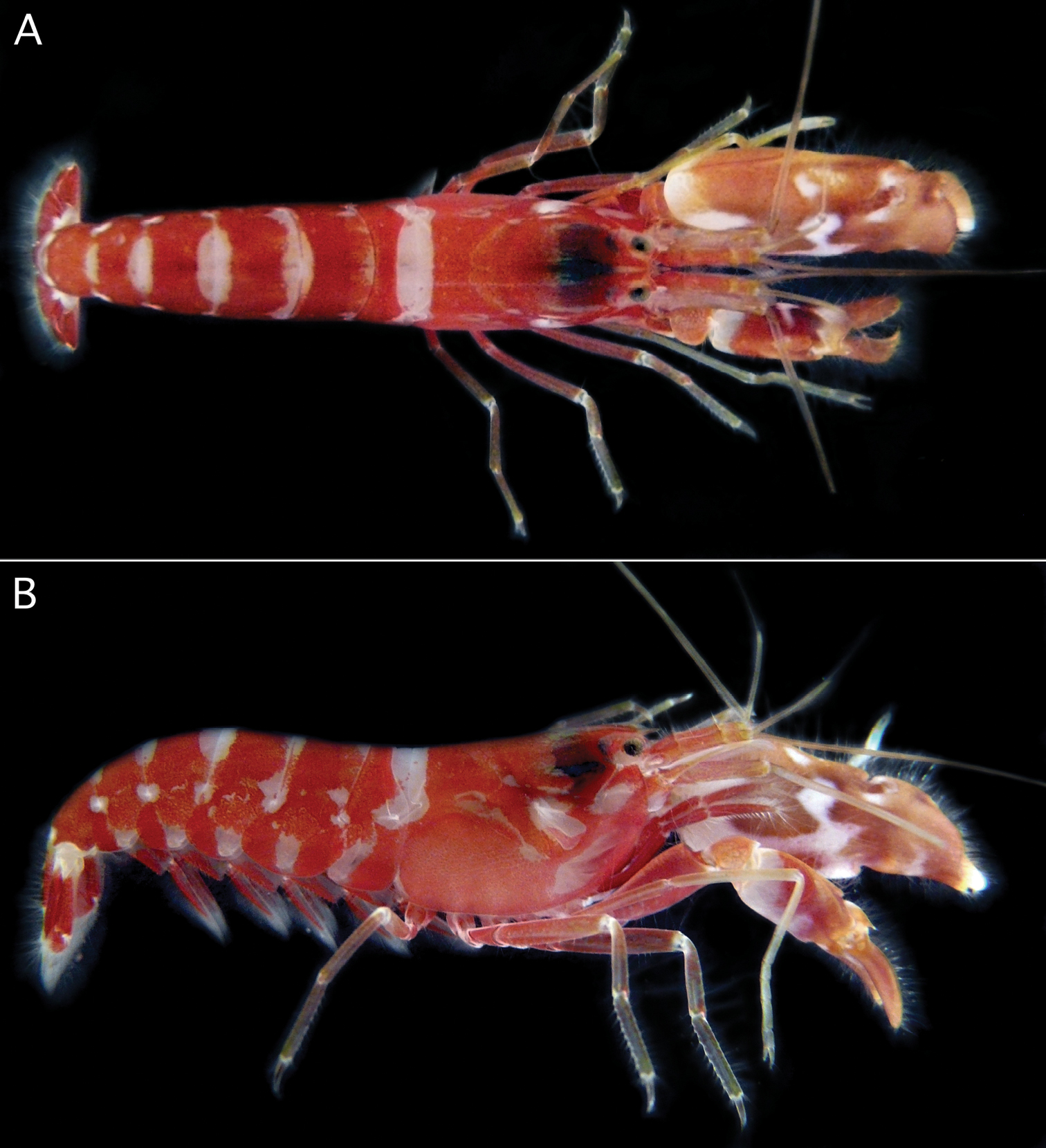
The holotype of Alpheus cedrici

Alpheus contains the following species:

- Alpheus abumusa Dehghani, Sari & Naderloo, 2019
- Alpheus acutocarinatus De Man, 1909
- Alpheus acutofemoratus Dana, 1852
- Alpheus adamastor Coutière, 1908
- Alpheus aequus Kim & Abele, 1988
- Alpheus africanus Balss, 1916
- Alpheus agilis Anker, Hurt & Knowlton, 2009
- Alpheus agrogon Ramos, 1997
- Alpheus alaincrosnieri Anker, 2020
- Alpheus albatrossae (AH Banner, 1953)
- Alpheus alcyone De Man, 1902
- Alpheus alpheopsides Coutière, 1905
- Alpheus amarillo Anker, 2012
- Alpheus amblyonyx Chace, 1972
- Alpheus amirantei Coutière, 1908
- Alpheus anchistus De Man, 1920
- Alpheus angulosus McClure, 2002
- Alpheus angustilineatus Nomura & Anker, 2005
- Alpheus ankeri Dehghani, Sari & Naderloo, 2019
- Alpheus antepaenultimus Kim & Abele, 1988
- Alpheus architectus De Man, 1897
- Alpheus arenensis (Chace, 1937)
- Alpheus arenicolus Banner & Banner, 1983
- Alpheus arethusa De Man, 1909
- Alpheus armatus Rathbun, 1901
- Alpheus armillatus H. Milne Edwards, 1837
- Alpheus arnoa Banner, 1957
- Alpheus astrinx Banner & Banner, 1982
- Alpheus australiensis Banner & Banner, 1982
- Alpheus australosulcatus Banner & Banner, 1982
- Alpheus baccheti Anker, 2010
- Alpheus bahamensis Rankin, 1898
- Alpheus balaenodigitus Banner & Banner, 1982
- Alpheus bannerorum Bruce, 1987
- Alpheus barbadensis (Schmitt, 1924)
- Alpheus barbatus Coutière, 1897
- Alpheus batesi Banner & Banner, 1964
- Alpheus bellimanus Lockington, 1877
- Alpheus bellulus Miya & Miyake, 1969
- Alpheus berumeni Anker, 2024
- Alpheus bicostatus De Man, 1908
- Alpheus bidens (Olivier, 1811)
- Alpheus bisincisus De Haan, 1849
- Alpheus blachei Crosnier & Forest, 1965
- Alpheus bouvieri A. Milne-Edwards, 1878
- Alpheus brachymerus (AH Banner, 1953)
- Alpheus bradypus Coutière, 1905
- Alpheus brasileiro Anker, 2012
- Alpheus brevicristatus De Haan, 1844
- Alpheus brevipes Stimpson, 1860
- Alpheus brevirostris (Olivier, 1811)
- Alpheus brucei Banner & Banner, 1982
- Alpheus bucephaloides Nobili, 1905
- Alpheus bucephalus Coutière, 1905
- Alpheus buchanorum Banner & Banner, 1983
- Alpheus buckupi Almeida, Terossi, Araújo-Silva & Mantelatto, 2013
- Alpheus bunburius Banner & Banner, 1982
- Alpheus burukovskyi Anker & Pachelle, 2015
- Alpheus caigeri Anker, 2024
- Alpheus californiensis Holmes, 1900
- Alpheus canaliculatus Banner & Banner, 1968
- Alpheus candei Guérin-Méneville, 1855
- Alpheus cangiopalus Marin & Thinh, 2024
- Alpheus carlae Anker, 2012
- Alpheus cedrici Anker & De Grave, 2012
- Alpheus chacei Carvacho, 1979
- Alpheus chamorro Banner, 1956
- Alpheus chilensis Coutière in Lenz, 1902
- Alpheus chiragricus H. Milne Edwards, 1837
- Alpheus christofferseni Anker, Hurt & Knowlton, 2007
- Alpheus clamator Lockington, 1877
- Alpheus clypeatus Coutière, 1905
- Alpheus coetivensis Coutière, 1908
- Alpheus collumianus Stimpson, 1860
- Alpheus colombiensis Wicksten, 1988
- Alpheus compressus Banner & Banner, 1981
- Alpheus confusus Carvacho, 1989
- Alpheus coralvivo Santos, Terossi, Mantelatto, Torres & Almeida, 2024
- Alpheus coutierei De Man, 1909
- Alpheus crinitus Dana, 1852
- Alpheus cristatus Coutière, 1897
- Alpheus cristulifrons Rathbun, 1900
- Alpheus crockeri (Armstrong, 1941)
- Alpheus cyanoteles Yeo & Ng, 1996
- Alpheus cylindricus Kingsley, 1878
- Alpheus cythereus Banner & Banner, 1966
- Alpheus dasycheles Coutière, 1908
- Alpheus davaoensis Chace, 1988
- Alpheus dentipes Guérin, 1832
- Alpheus deuteropus Hilgendorf, 1879
- Alpheus diadema Dana, 1852
- Alpheus digitalis De Haan, 1844
- Alpheus dingabadi Anker, 2023
- Alpheus dispar Randall, 1840
- Alpheus distinctus Kim & Abele, 1988
- Alpheus djeddensis Coutière, 1897
- Alpheus djiboutensis De Man, 1909
- Alpheus dolerus Banner, 1956
- Alpheus echiurophilus Anker, Komai & Marin, 2015
- Alpheus edamensis De Man, 1888
- Alpheus edwardsii (Audouin, 1826)
- Alpheus ehlersii De Man, 1909
- Alpheus estuariensis Christoffersen, 1984
- Alpheus euchirus Dana, 1852
- Alpheus eulimene De Man, 1909
- Alpheus euphrosyne De Man, 1897
- Alpheus eurydactylus De Man, 1920
- Alpheus exilis Kim & Abele, 1988
- Alpheus explorator Boone, 1935
- Alpheus facetus De Man, 1908
- Alpheus fagei Crosnier & Forest, 1965
- Alpheus fasciatus Lockington, 1878
- Alpheus fasqueli Anker, 2001
- Alpheus felgenhaueri Kim & Abele, 1988
- Alpheus fenneri Bruce, 1994
- Alpheus firmus Kim & Abele, 1988
- Alpheus floridanus Kingsley, 1878
- Alpheus foresti Banner & Banner, 1981
- Alpheus formosus Gibbes, 1850
- Alpheus frontalis H. Milne Edwards, 1837
- Alpheus fujitai Nomura & Anker, 2005
- Alpheus funafutensis Borradaile, 1899
- Alpheus fushima Nomura, 2009
- Alpheus galapagensis Sivertsen, 1933
- Alpheus gallicus Scioli & Anker, 2020
- Alpheus georgei Banner & Banner, 1982
- Alpheus glaber (Olivi, 1792)
- Alpheus gracilipes Stimpson, 1860
- Alpheus gracilis Heller, 1861
- Alpheus grahami Abele, 1975
- Alpheus haanii Ortmann, 1890
- Alpheus hailstonei Coutière, 1905
- Alpheus hebes Kim & Abele, 1988
- Alpheus heeia Banner & Banner, 1975
- Alpheus hephaestus Bracken-Grissom & Felder, 2014
- Alpheus heronicus Banner & Banner, 1982
- Alpheus heterocarpus (Yu, 1935)
- Alpheus heterochaelis Say, 1818
- Alpheus heurteli Coutière, 1897
- Alpheus hippothoe De Man, 1888
- Alpheus holthuisi Ribeiro, 1964
- Alpheus homochirus (Yu, 1935)
- Alpheus hoonsooi Kim & Abele, 1988
- Alpheus hoplocheles Coutière, 1897
- Alpheus hortensis Wicksten & McClure, 2003
- Alpheus hululensis Coutière, 1905
- Alpheus hutchingsae Banner & Banner, 1982
- Alpheus hyeyoungae Kim & Abele, 1988
- Alpheus hyphalus Chace, 1988
- Alpheus idiocheles Coutière, 1905
- Alpheus ikedosoma Komai, 2015
- Alpheus imitatrix De Man, 1909
- Alpheus immaculatus Knowlton & Keller, 1983
- Alpheus inca Wicksten & Méndez G., 1981
- Alpheus inopinatus Holthuis & Gottlieb, 1958
- Alpheus intrinsecus Spence Bate, 1888
- Alpheus japonicus Miers, 1879
- Alpheus javieri Anker, Hurt & Knowlton, 2009
- Alpheus kagoshimanus Hayashi & Nagata, 2000
- Alpheus karplusi Anker, 2022
- Alpheus kuroshimensis Nomura & Anker, 2005
- Alpheus labis Banner & Banner, 1982
- Alpheus lacertosus Kim & Abele, 1988
- Alpheus ladronis Banner, 1956
- Alpheus lanceloti Coutière, 1905
- Alpheus lanceostylus Banner, 1959
- Alpheus lancirostris Rankin, 1900
- Alpheus latus Kim & Abele, 1988
- Alpheus lentiginosus Anker & Nizinski, 2011
- Alpheus lepidus De Man, 1908
- Alpheus leptocheles Banner & Banner, 1975
- Alpheus leptochiroides De Man, 1909
- Alpheus leptochirus Coutière, 1905
- Alpheus leviusculus Dana, 1852
- Alpheus lobidens De Haan, 1849
- Alpheus longecarinatus Hilgendorf, 1879
- Alpheus longichaelis Carvacho, 1979
- Alpheus longiforceps Hayashi & Nagata, 2002
- Alpheus longinquus Kim & Abele, 1988
- Alpheus longipalma Komai & Ohtomi, 2018
- Alpheus lottini Guérin, 1829
- Alpheus luiszapatai Ramos-Tafur, 2018
- Alpheus lutosus Anker & De Grave, 2009
- Alpheus macellarius Chace, 1988
- Alpheus macrocheles (Hailstone, 1835)
- Alpheus macrodactylus Ortmann, 1890
- Alpheus macroskeles Alcock & Anderson, 1899
- Alpheus maindroni Coutière, 1898
- Alpheus malabaricus (Fabricius, 1775)
- Alpheus malleator Dana, 1852
- Alpheus malleodigitus (Spence Bate, 1888)
- Alpheus mangalis Anker, 2023
- Alpheus mannarensis Purushothaman, Abhilash, Ajith Kumar & Lal, 2021
- Alpheus margaritae Salgado-Barragán, Ayón-Parente & Zamora-Tavares, 2017
- Alpheus martini Kim & Abele, 1988
- Alpheus mathewsae Anker, 2012
- Alpheus mazatlanicus Wicksten, 1983
- Alpheus microrhynchus De Man, 1897
- Alpheus microscaphis (Banner, 1959)
- Alpheus microstylus (Spence Bate, 1888)
- Alpheus midas Pachelle & Anker, 2024
- Alpheus miersi Coutière, 1898
- Alpheus migrans Lewinsohn & Holthuis, 1978
- Alpheus millsae Anker, Hurt & Knowlton, 2007
- Alpheus mitis Dana, 1852
- Alpheus mohammadpouri Dehghani, Sari & Naderloo, 2019
- Alpheus moretensis Banner & Banner, 1982
- Alpheus naos Anker, Hurt & Knowlton, 2007
- Alpheus naranjo Anker, 2018
- Alpheus nipa Banner & Banner, 1985
- Alpheus nobili Banner & Banner, 1966
- Alpheus nomurai Anker, 2023
- Alpheus nonalter Kensley, 1969
- Alpheus normanni Kingsley, 1878
- Alpheus notabilis Stebbing, 1915
- Alpheus novaezealandiae Miers, 1876
- Alpheus nuno Anker, 2012
- Alpheus nuttingi (Schmitt, 1924)
- Alpheus oahuensis (AH Banner, 1953)
- Alpheus obesomanus Dana, 1852
- Alpheus octocellatus Anker & Benzoni, 2023
- Alpheus ovaliceps Coutière, 1905
- Alpheus pachychirus Stimpson, 1860
- Alpheus pacificus Dana, 1852
- Alpheus packardii Kingsley, 1880
- Alpheus paludicola Kemp, 1915
- Alpheus panamensis Kingsley, 1878
- Alpheus papillosus Banner & Banner, 1982
- Alpheus paracrinitus Miers, 1881
- Alpheus paradentipes Coutière, 1905
- Alpheus paraformosus Anker, Hurt & Knowlton, 2008
- Alpheus paralcyone Coutière, 1905
- Alpheus paralpheopsides Coutière, 1905
- Alpheus parasocialis Banner & Banner, 1982
- Alpheus pareuchirus Coutière, 1905
- Alpheus parvimaculatus Nomura & Anker, 2005
- Alpheus parvirostris Dana, 1852
- Alpheus parvus De Man, 1909
- Alpheus peasei (Armstrong, 1940)
- Alpheus percyi Coutière, 1908
- Alpheus perezi Coutière, 1908
- Alpheus perlas Anker & Pachelle, 2019
- Alpheus perplexus Banner, 1956
- Alpheus petronioi Almeida, Terrosi & Mantelatto, 2014
- Alpheus philoctetes De Man, 1909
- Alpheus platycheirus Boone, 1927
- Alpheus platydactylus Coutière, 1897
- Alpheus platyunguiculatus (AH Banner, 1953)
- Alpheus polystictus Knowlton & Keller, 1985
- Alpheus polyxo De Man, 1909
- Alpheus pontederiae de Rochebrune, 1883
- Alpheus pouang Christoffersen, 1979
- Alpheus praedator De Man, 1908
- Alpheus proseuchirus De Man, 1908
- Alpheus pseudopugnax (AH Banner, 1953)
- Alpheus puapeba Christoffersen, 1979
- Alpheus pubescens De Man, 1908
- Alpheus pugnax Dana, 1852
- Alpheus punctatus Anker, 2012
- Alpheus pustulosus Banner & Banner, 1968
- Alpheus quasirapacida Chace, 1988
- Alpheus ramosportoae Soledade, Terossi, Scioli, Mantelatto & Almeida, 2019
- Alpheus randalli Banner & Banner, 1980
- Alpheus rapacida De Man, 1908
- Alpheus rapax Fabricius, 1798
- Alpheus rectus Kim & Abele, 1988
- Alpheus ribeiroae Anker & Dworschak, 2004
- Alpheus richardsoni Yaldwyn, 1971
- Alpheus richpalmeri Anker, 2020
- Alpheus roblesi Bracken-Grissom & Felder, 2014
- Alpheus romensky Burukovsky, 1990
- Alpheus roquensis Knowlton & Keller, 1985
- Alpheus roseodigitalis Nomura & Anker, 2005
- Alpheus rostratus Kim & Abele, 1988
- Alpheus rudolphi Almeida & Anker, 2011
- Alpheus rugimanus A. Milne-Edwards, 1878
- Alpheus samoa Banner & Banner, 1966
- Alpheus samudra De Grave, Krishnan, Kumar K.P. & Christodoulou, 2020
- Alpheus sarapis Anker, 2025
- Alpheus savuensis De Man, 1908
- Alpheus saxidomus Holthuis, 1980
- Alpheus schmitti Chace, 1972
- Alpheus schubarti Anker, 2024
- Alpheus sciolii Anker, 2022
- Alpheus scopulus Kim & Abele, 1988
- Alpheus serenei Tiwari, 1964
- Alpheus shukran Anker, 2024
- Alpheus sibogae De Man, 1908
- Alpheus simus Guérin-Méneville, 1855
- Alpheus sizou Banner & Banner, 1967
- Alpheus socialis Heller, 1862
- Alpheus soelae Banner & Banner, 1986
- Alpheus songkla Banner & Banner, 1966
- Alpheus soror Bruce, 1999
- Alpheus spatulatus Banner & Banner, 1968
- Alpheus splendidus Coutière, 1897
- Alpheus spongiarum Coutière, 1897
- Alpheus stanleyi Coutière, 1908
- Alpheus stantoni Banner & Banner, 1986
- Alpheus staphylinus Coutière, 1908
- Alpheus stephensoni Banner & Smalley, 1969
- Alpheus strenuus Dana, 1852
- Alpheus styliceps Coutière, 1905
- Alpheus sudara Banner & Banner, 1966
- Alpheus sulcatus Kingsley, 1878
- Alpheus sulcipalma Purushothaman, Bharathi, Damodhar, Kumar & Lal, 2023
- Alpheus suluensis Chace, 1988
- Alpheus supachai Banner & Banner, 1966
- Alpheus superciliaris Coutière, 1905
- Alpheus takla Anker, 2023
- Alpheus talismani Coutière, 1898
- Alpheus tampensis Anker, 2012
- Alpheus tasmanicus Banner & Banner, 1982
- Alpheus tenuicarpus De Man, 1908
- Alpheus tenuipes De Man, 1910
- Alpheus tenuis Kim & Abele, 1988
- Alpheus thomasi Hendrix & Gore, 1973
- Alpheus thompsoni Anker, 2022
- Alpheus tigrinus Anker, 2024
- Alpheus tirmiziae Kazmi, 1974
- Alpheus tricolor Anker, 2001
- Alpheus triphopus Nobili, 1906
- Alpheus tungii Banner & Banner, 1966
- Alpheus ulalae Bracken-Grissom & Felder, 2014
- Alpheus umbo Kim & Abele, 1988
- Alpheus utriensis Ramos & von Prahl, 1989
- Alpheus vanderbilti Boone, 1930
- Alpheus vanuatu Anker, 2020
- Alpheus verrilli (Schmitt, 1924)
- Alpheus villosus (Olivier, 1811)
- Alpheus villus Kim & Abele, 1988
- Alpheus viridari (Armstrong, 1949)
- Alpheus viserion Anker, Leray & Pachelle, 2021
- Alpheus vladivostokiensis (Vinogradov, 1950)
- Alpheus waltervadi Kensley, 1969
- Alpheus websteri Kingsley, 1880
- Alpheus wickstenae Christoffersen & Ramos, 1987
- Alpheus williamsi Bruce, 1994
- Alpheus wonkimi Anker & Pachelle, 2013
- Alpheus xanthocarpus Anker, Hurt & Knowlton, 2008
- Alpheus xishaensis Liu & Lan, 1980
- Alpheus zarenkovi Anker & Pachelle, 2015
- Alpheus zimmermani Anker, 2007
- Alpheus zulfaquiri Kazmi, 1982
