= Alpheus tricolor =

Scientific classification
- Kingdom: Animalia
- Phylum: Arthropoda
- Clade: Pancrustacea
- Class: Malacostraca
- Order: Decapoda
- Suborder: Pleocyemata
- Infraorder: Caridea
- Family: Alpheidae
- Genus: Alpheus
- Species: A. tricolor

Binomial name
- Alpheus tricolor Anker, 2001

Species of crustacean

Alpheus tricolor is a crustacean belonging to the family of snapping shrimp. It was first isolated in Indonesia and Sri Lanka. It counts with a setose carapace, an acute rostrum, shallow adrostral furrows and a basicerite with a strong ventrolateral tooth. The lamella of its scaphocerite is not reduced, with an anterior margin that is concave. Its third maxilliped counts with an epipodial plate bearing thick setae, while its first chelipeds are found with their merus bearing a strong disto-mesial tooth; its third pereiopod has an armed ischium, with a simple and conical dactylus. Its telson is broad, distally tapering, with 2 pairs of dorsal spines. The species is named after its characteristic colour pattern, including white, red and orange.

== Description ==
Alpheus tricolor has a carapace length of about 13.5 millimetres (0.53 in), a total length of 36 millimetres (1.4 in) and chela length of 16 millimetres (0.63 in). Its carapace is smooth, possessing shallow grooves latero-anteriorly, and erect setae dorsally. Its pterygostomial angle is rounded, while its rostrum is well developed and acute; its orbital hoods are inflated, lacking teeth. Its eyes have small anterior processes, and its antennular peduncles are stout.

Its antenna shows a basicerite bearing an acute, ventrolateral tooth. Its mouthparts are typical for Alpheus: its mandible with a 2-jointed palp, its incisor process bearing about 12 teeth, and showing a stout molar process; its maxillula has a bilobed palp, while its maxilla shows no characteristics of note.

The surface of each somite on its abdomen bears conspicuous setae that are proximal to its dorsoposterior margin. Its uropodal exopod has a strong lateral spine, and a sinuous diaresis. The species' telson is broad, distally tapering, exhibiting 2 pairs of dorsal spines in deep depressions; it counts with numerous long setae between lateral spines. Its anal tubercles are well developed.

=== Coloration ===
Its carapace is coloured mostly yellow-orange, with three white patches laterally. Its rostrum is reddish-orange and its orbital hoods translucent. The antennal and antennular peduncles are orange-red, while its mouthparts are mostly found to be colourless, except for the palp and caridean lobe of its first maxilliped, which are reddish. Its major and minor chelipeds are orange-red; the merus showing a distal white patch; chelae almost white on the tips of fingers. In younger individuals, fingers and distal portions of palms are white. The species' abdominal segments are dorsally yellow-orange, lateroventrally deep red. The tail fan is a deep red colour, with a broad white band across its near half.

== Behaviour ==
The shrimp is thought to spend most of the time in burrows and not interacting with other species, as observed with specimens in aquariums. This is different behaviour as that observed in Alpheus bellulus.

== See also ==
- Decapod anatomy
