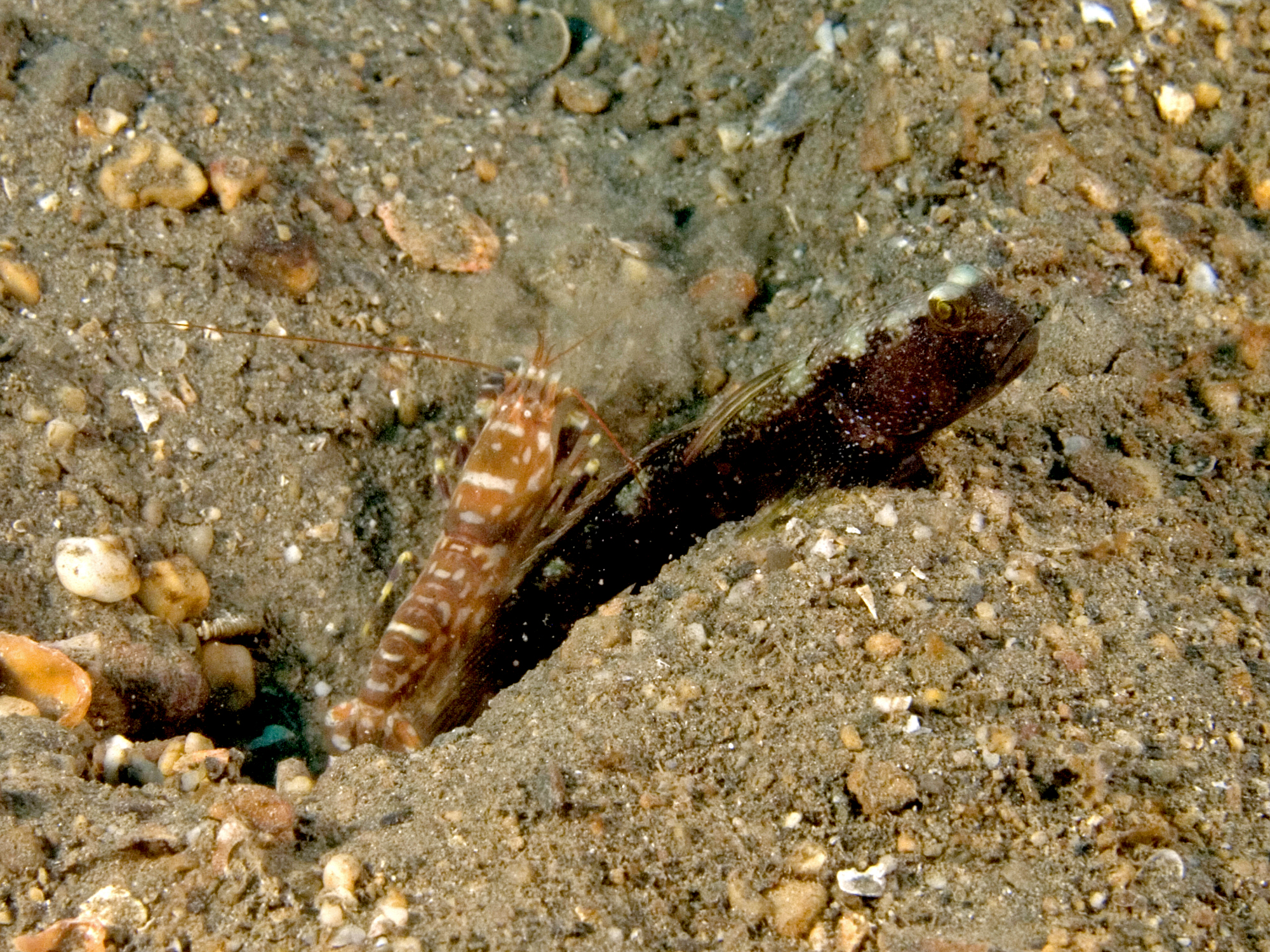

Scientific classification
- Kingdom: Animalia
- Phylum: Chordata
- Class: Actinopterygii
- Order: Gobiiformes
- Family: Gobiidae
- Genus: Cryptocentrus
- Species: C. strigilliceps

Binomial name
- Cryptocentrus strigilliceps (D. S. Jordan & Seale, 1906)

Synonyms
- Mars strigilliceps D. S. Jordan & Seale, 1906

= Target shrimp goby =

Species of fish

The target shrimpgoby (Cryptocentrus strigilliceps) is a species of goby native to the Indo-West-Pacific where it occurs near coasts on silty or sandy reefs at depths of from 3 to 15 metres (9.8 to 49.2 ft). This species is symbiotic with alpheid shrimps. It can reach a length of 10 centimetres (3.9 in) TL. This species can also be found in the aquarium trade.
