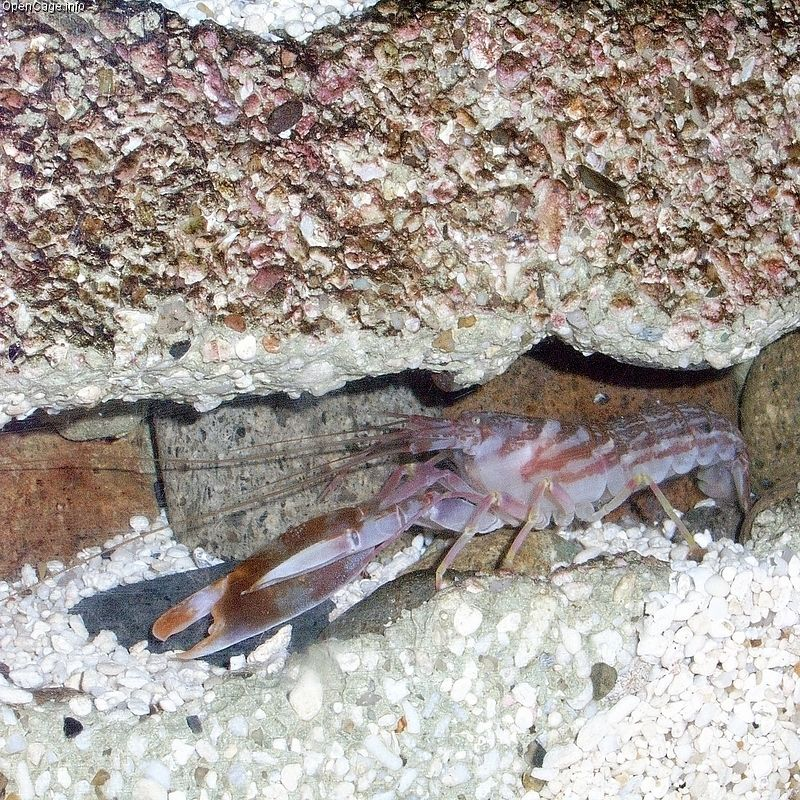
- Alpheus digitalis

Scientific classification
- Kingdom: Animalia
- Phylum: Arthropoda
- Class: Malacostraca
- Order: Decapoda
- Suborder: Pleocyemata
- Infraorder: Caridea
- Family: Alpheidae
- Genus: Alpheus
- Species: A. digitalis

Binomial name
- Alpheus digitalis De Haan, 1844

= Alpheus digitalis =

Alpheus digitalis Temporal range: Pleistocene to Present

Species of shrimp

Alpheus digitalis is a species of pistol shrimp in the family Alpheidae. The species was first discovered after a taxonomic study of a snapping shrimp from the genus Alpheus from Japan and the Gulf of Thailand, of which, it was found that two species was confounded under A.digitalis, which was originally described based on a single specimen possessing abnormal chelipeds.

== Differences between A. digitalis & A. longiforceps ==
Between the two species, the most unique difference is coloration and morphology. A.longiforceps, the new species, can be differentiated from A.digitalis by the more slender (rather than connex), flexor margin, the longer male minor chela, more elongate dactylus, possession of a single (rather than two), obliquely transverse white bands on the spot which is located on the lateral surface of the fourth abdominal region. The present day new species is referred to the Alpheus brevirostris species group, mainly because of the compressed palm of the major cheliped and the subpatulate ductylus of the pereiopods 3 and 4.

== See also ==
- Synalpheus
- Athanas
