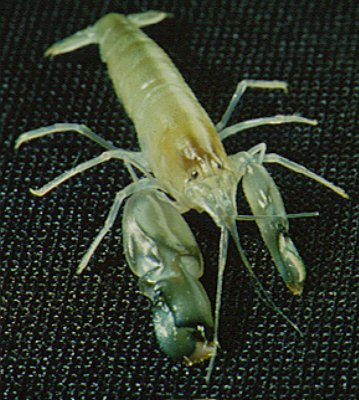

Scientific classification
- Kingdom: Animalia
- Phylum: Arthropoda
- Clade: Pancrustacea
- Class: Malacostraca
- Order: Decapoda
- Suborder: Pleocyemata
- Infraorder: Caridea
- Family: Alpheidae
- Genus: Alpheus
- Species: A. heterochaelis

Binomial name
- Alpheus heterochaelis Say, 1818

Synonyms
- Alpheus andronyx Christoffersen, 1998; Halopsyche lutaria de Saussure, 1857; Crangon heterochaelis

= Alpheus heterochaelis =

Species of crustacean

Alpheus heterochaelis, the bigclaw snapping shrimp, is a snapper or pistol shrimp in the family Alpheidae. It is found in the western Atlantic Ocean and the Gulf of Mexico.

== Description ==
The bigclaw snapping shrimp has a small rostrum and no spines on the edge of its carapace. The big claw or chela which gives it its common name can be either the right or left claw and is disproportionally large, measuring half the length of the body. It has a deep notch on either side beneath the finger joint. The other claw is unmodified and of normal size. The bigclaw is the largest species of snapping shrimp in its home range, growing to a maximum length of 5.5 centimetres (2.2 in), but most adults are considerably smaller than this. Its colour is a translucent dark green with orange and blue tips to the uropods.

== Distribution and habitat ==
The bigclaw snapping shrimp is found in tropical and semitropical waters in the Gulf of Mexico, the West Indies, Bermuda, and the western Atlantic Ocean from Cape Hatteras south to Florida and Brazil. It lives close to the seabed in shallow waters favouring reefs, seagrass meadows, salt marshes and muddy areas. It often conceals itself in a natural aperture during the day though it is unclear whether it can dig itself a burrow.

== Biology ==
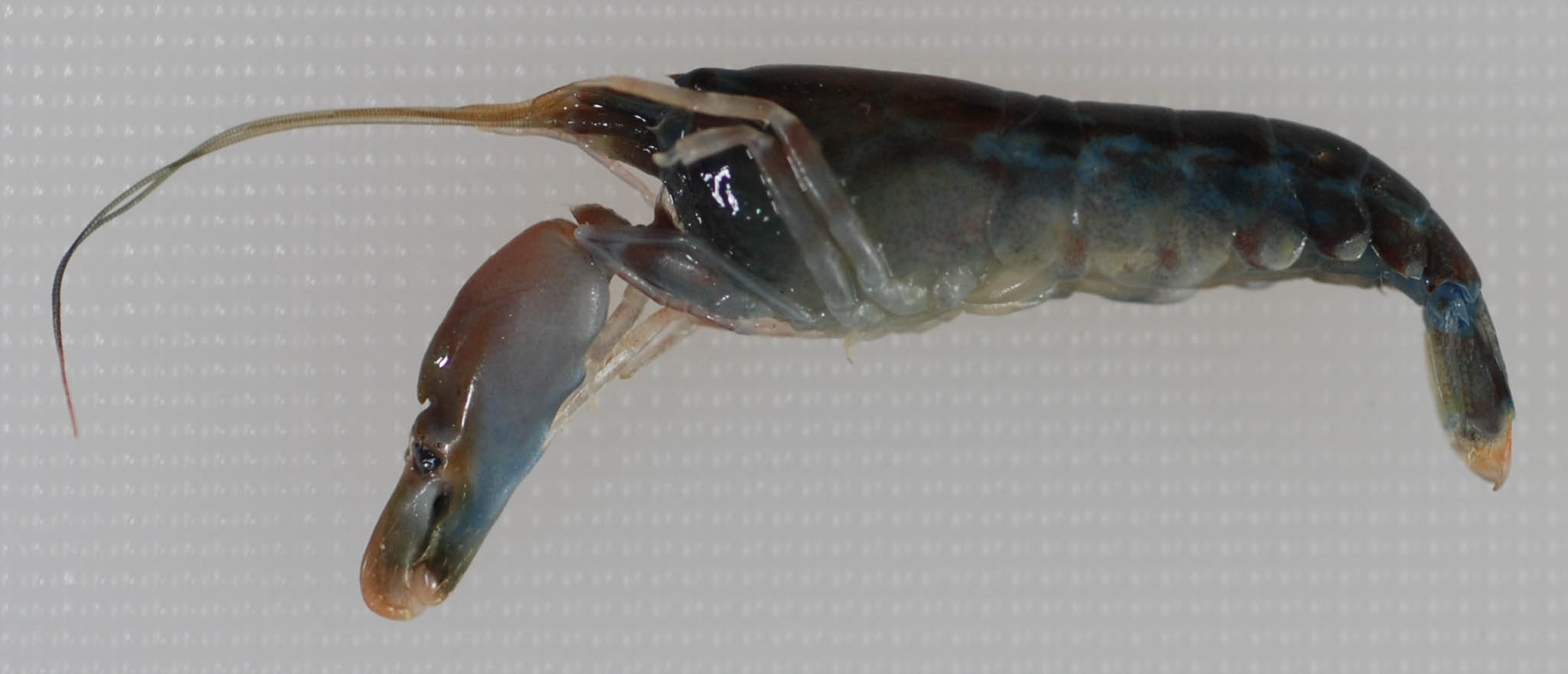
A dark-blue specimen of Alpheus heterochaelis

The bigclaw snapping shrimp produces a loud, staccato concussive noise with its snapping claw. The sound is produced when the claw snaps shut at great speed creating a high-speed water jet. This creates a small, short-lived cavitation bubble and it is the immediate collapse of this bubble that creates the sound. A spark is formed at the same time. The snapping noise serves to deter predators and to stun prey, and is also used for display purposes. The duration of time that the bigclaw snapping shrimp has its snapping claw cocked does not affect the distance that the stun travels. There is a limit of how of far the stun can travel, cocking after that limit won't affect the stun anymore.

The bigclaw snapping shrimp feeds on worms, small crustaceans and fish such as gobies and pearlfish. It is itself eaten by the weakfish (Cynoscion regalis). It is often associated with the black-clawed mud crab (Panopeus herbstii), sharing the crab's burrow and remaining uneaten, even though this crab eats similar-sized shrimps of other species.

Bigclaw snapping shrimps mostly live as monogamous pairs. The female is only receptive for a short time just after moulting. The eggs hatch about four weeks after being laid and the larvae do not feed, but instead rely on their egg yolks. They develop very quickly and pass through their three larval stages in about five days. The newly metamorphosed juvenile shrimps have equal sized chelae; one of these enlarges at a later stage.
