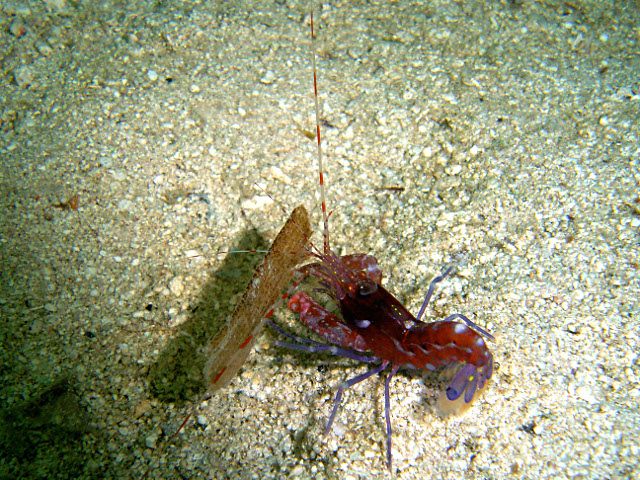

Scientific classification
- Domain: Eukaryota
- Kingdom: Animalia
- Phylum: Arthropoda
- Class: Malacostraca
- Order: Decapoda
- Suborder: Pleocyemata
- Infraorder: Caridea
- Family: Alpheidae
- Genus: Alpheus
- Species: A. armatus

Binomial name
- Alpheus armatus Rathbun, 1901

= Alpheus armatus =

Species of crustacean

Alpheus armatus is a species of snapping shrimp in the family Alpheidae, found in shallow water in the Caribbean Sea and the Gulf of Mexico. It lives in association with a sea anemone such as Bartholomea annulata, clearing out sand from the cracks and crevices in which the sea anemone often lives.

== Description ==
Alpheus armatus is a moderate-sized shrimp, growing to a length of 2 to 5 cm (0.8 to 2.0 in). The antennae are white with dark bands, and the body is brown, orange or red, spotted with white. One of the front pair of legs bears an enormous pincer, used as a hunting and deterrent weapon, which is capable of producing a loud "click". The other front leg bears a small claw.

== Distribution and habitat ==
Alpheus armatus occurs in the tropical and subtropical western Atlantic Ocean, the Caribbean Sea and the Gulf of Mexico, usually at depths greater than 10 m (33 ft). The very similar Alpheus immaculatus, with which A. armatus forms a species complex, mostly occurs between 13 and 25 m (43 and 82 ft). Both shrimps live in association with a sea anemone, usually Bartholomea annulata, which inhabits caves, overhangs and crevices, as well as coral rubble; the sea anemone conceals its foot and column in a concealed place and extends its tentacles into the water column to feed. When disturbed, the sea anemone contracts its body back into its lair, where it can defend itself with its stinging tentacles. Where the sea anemone lives close to a sandy seabed or in a turbulent location, it is more likely to have one or a pair of symbiotic shrimps living in association with it, than is a sea anemone further from the seabed.

== Ecology ==
Alpheus armatus is a predator, feeding on small crustaceans, molluscs and even tiny fish. When a potential prey approaches this shrimp, it opens its large pincer wide and advances on the intruder, snapping the claw shut with a loud click. This sends out a jet of water like a water pistol and "knocks out" its prey; the click is caused by the bursting of the cavitation bubble that forms as the claw closes. The stunned prey is carried to the shrimp's lair and consumed. If for some reason the snapping claw is lost, the other claw enlarges, taking on the shape and function of the snapping claw, although never attaining the size of the original. At the next moult, a new small claw develops on the damaged limb, but does not resume its original function.

Alpheus armatus is an obligate symbiont of a sea anemone, commonly Bartholomea annulata, and is able to acclimatise to its toxins. The shrimp searches out the sea anemone even when both are completely buried in sand. The shrimp actively clears away sand obstructing the entrance to the sea anemone's lair. While cleaning the den, the shrimp exhibits three separate behaviours, digging, tossing sand and tamping. The sea anemone benefits from these actions by being able to better contract into its lair for its own protection; the shrimp benefits from the protection provided by the sea anemone's stinging tentacles.
