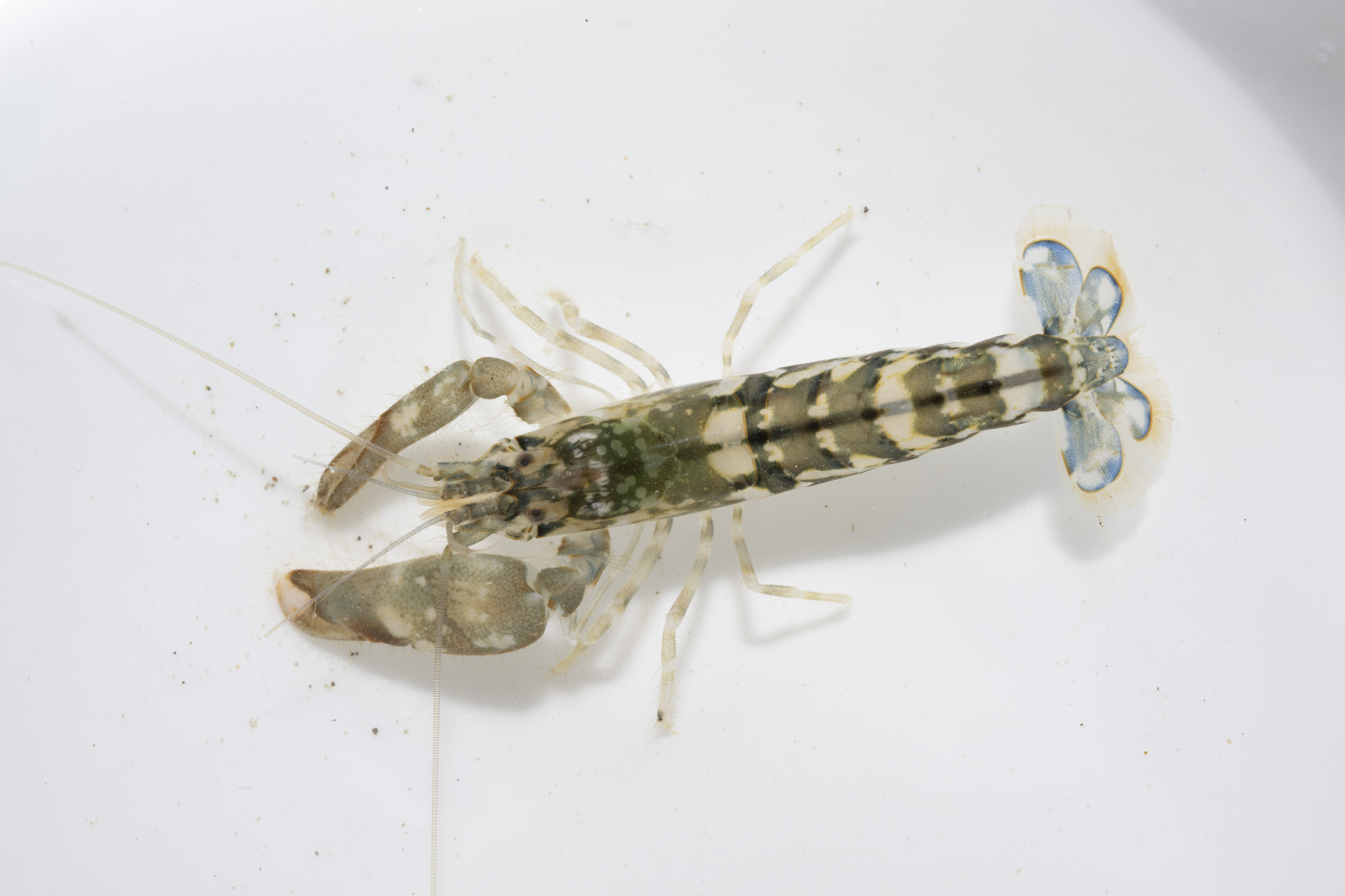

Scientific classification
- Kingdom: Animalia
- Phylum: Arthropoda
- Class: Malacostraca
- Order: Decapoda
- Suborder: Pleocyemata
- Infraorder: Caridea
- Family: Alpheidae
- Genus: Alpheus
- Species: A. novaezealandiae

Binomial name
- Alpheus novaezealandiae Miers, 1876

= Alpheus novaezealandiae =

Species of crustacean

Alpheus novaezealandiae is a species of shrimp in the family Alpheidae, found in Australasia. It was described by Edward J. Miers in 1876.

A. novaezelandiae is found around the coasts of New Zealand, Lord Howe Island and all coasts of Australia, where it lives under rocks from the intertidal zone to a depth of 25 metres (82 ft). It is a large species, growing to a length of 68 millimetres (2.7 in), and is dark in colouration.

== Description ==
A. novaezelandiae has a dark grey-green or purplish body, with some white markings on much of the body, aside from the chelae. The eggs are brown.
