= Alpheus bisincisus =

Scientific classification
- Kingdom: Animalia
- Phylum: Arthropoda
- Class: Malacostraca
- Order: Decapoda
- Suborder: Pleocyemata
- Infraorder: Caridea
- Family: Alpheidae
- Genus: Alpheus
- Species: A. bisincisus

Binomial name
- Alpheus bisincisus De Haan, 1844

Species of crustacean

Alpheus bisincisus, the flathead snapping shrimp or red snapping shrimp, is a species of snapping shrimp found in the Indo-West Pacific.
