= Alpheus nomurai =

Scientific classification
- Kingdom: Animalia
- Phylum: Arthropoda
- Clade: Pancrustacea
- Class: Malacostraca
- Order: Decapoda
- Suborder: Pleocyemata
- Infraorder: Caridea
- Family: Alpheidae
- Genus: Alpheus
- Species: A. nomurai

Binomial name
- Alpheus nomurai Anker, 2023

Species of crustacean

Alpheus nomurai is a species of crustacean in the family Alpheidae ("snapping shrimps") found in salt water in Japan.
