= Alpheus malleator =

Scientific classification
- Domain: Eukaryota
- Kingdom: Animalia
- Phylum: Arthropoda
- Class: Malacostraca
- Order: Decapoda
- Suborder: Pleocyemata
- Infraorder: Caridea
- Family: Alpheidae
- Genus: Alpheus
- Species: A. malleator

Binomial name
- Alpheus malleator Dana, 1852

Species of shrimp

Alpheus malleator, the hammerclaw snapping shrimp or bumpy-clawed snapping shrimp, is a species of marine snapping shrimp. It is considered the most distinctive species in the genus Alpheus due to intricate morphological features.

== Distribution ==
Alpheus malleator is found along the western Central American coast, including Ecuador and the Galapagos Islands, and in the east and the west of the Atlantic Ocean. The type locality is believed to be in Rio de Janeiro.
