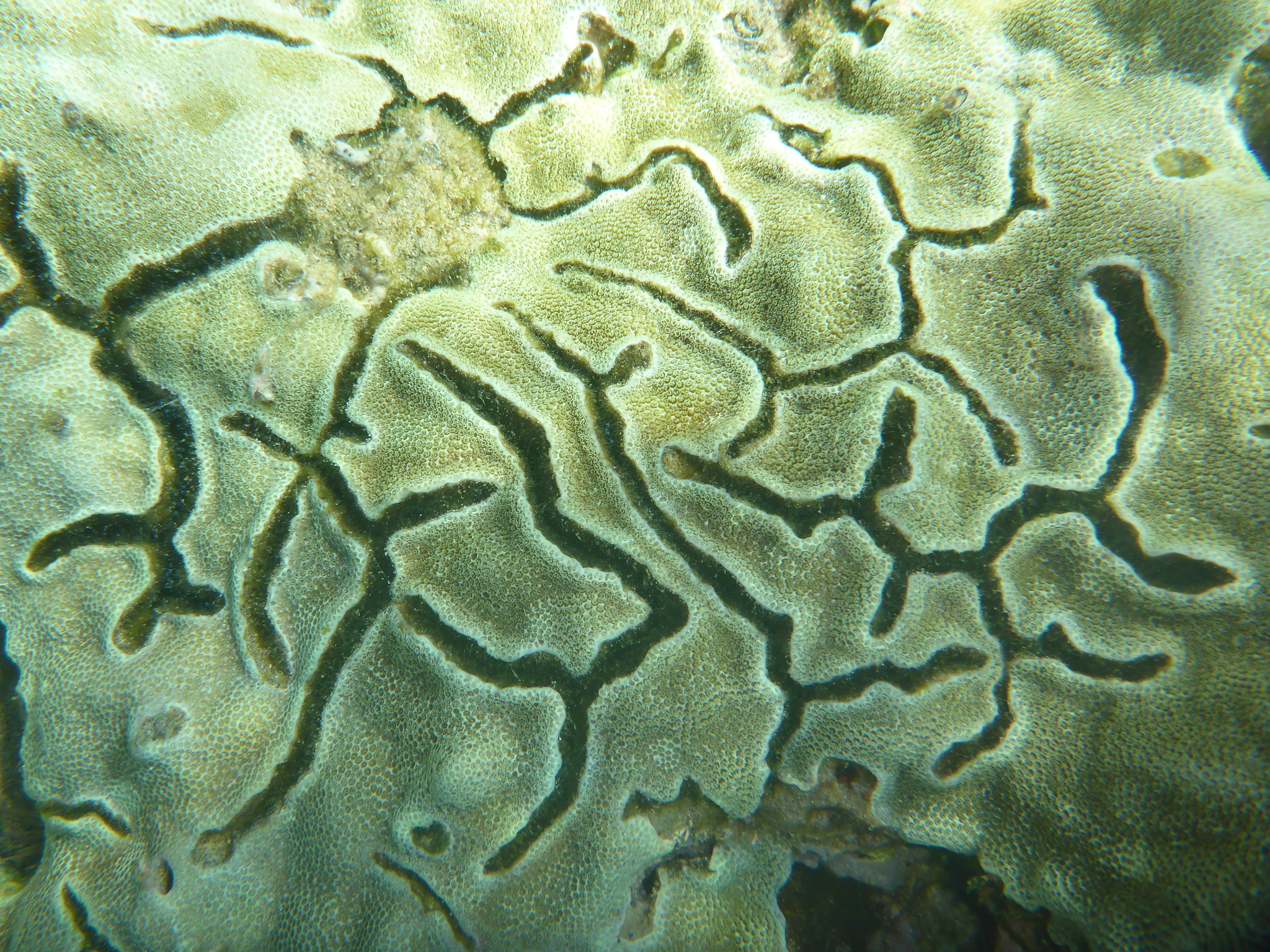
- Namesake grooves in a Porites coral

Scientific classification
- Kingdom: Animalia
- Phylum: Arthropoda
- Clade: Pancrustacea
- Class: Malacostraca
- Order: Decapoda
- Suborder: Pleocyemata
- Infraorder: Caridea
- Family: Alpheidae
- Genus: Alpheus
- Species: A. deuteropus

Binomial name
- Alpheus deuteropus Hilgendorf, 1879

= Alpheus deuteropus =

Species of crustacean

Alpheus deuteropus or the petroglyph shrimp is a snapper or pistol shrimp in the family Alpheidae. It lives on coral reefs in tropical parts of the Indian and Pacific Oceans and in the Red Sea, as a commensal of corals such as Porites lobata. Its presence among the lobes leaves tunnels, cracks and grooves in the surface.

== Description ==
The shrimp has red dots on its carapace and is otherwise colorless. Male shrimp can grow to 3 centimetres (1.2 in). Like other snapper shrimp, one of the chelipeds is much bigger than the other and is modified to make an explosive clicking noise. The body is only slightly laterally compressed and does not have a crest on the carapace. There is an orbital hood surrounding the eyes. It uses drag powered swimming with its legs to move through the water. Like other shrimps in the same family, its body is bilaterally symmetrical. The primary food source of the shrimp is algae.

== Distribution and habitat ==
Mainly distributed in the Indo-West Pacific ocean regions, with most specimens found in East Africa, the Philippines, and Hawaii. Lives in tropical, coral reef environments and can be found at a depth of 1 to 15 meters below sea level. Optimal temperature for survival is 23°C to 29°C.

== Cultural significance ==
The common name is referencing how the burrows of the shrimp have been known to resemble ancient Hawaiian petroglyphs.
