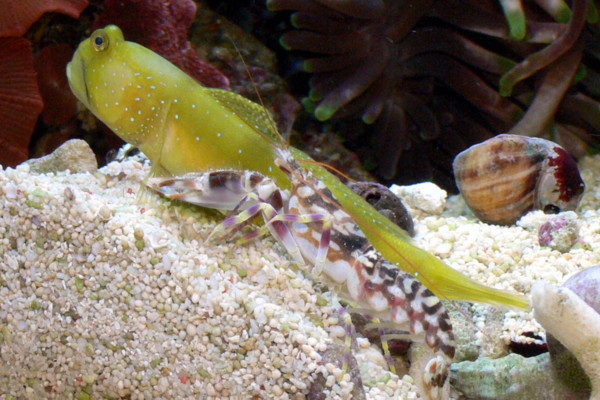
- A. bellulus and Cryptocentrus cinctus

Scientific classification
- Kingdom: Animalia
- Phylum: Arthropoda
- Clade: Pancrustacea
- Class: Malacostraca
- Order: Decapoda
- Suborder: Pleocyemata
- Infraorder: Caridea
- Family: Alpheidae
- Genus: Alpheus
- Species: A. bellulus

Binomial name
- Alpheus bellulus Miya & Miyake, 1969

= Tiger pistol shrimp =

Species of crustacean

The tiger pistol shrimp (Alpheus bellulus) is a species of shrimp belonging to the family Alpheidae, which are commonly known as snapping shrimp.

The Alpheidae family is incredibly diverse with over 500 unique species across the world. Alpheus bellulus shares a translocation and inversion event of trnE in its mitogenome with several other Alpheus species but there is not enough evidence to say this is a shared commonality among the entire genus. Phylogeny suggests Alpheus randalli and Alpheus bellulus belong to the same taxon within a monophyletic group. Amino acid composition of the cytochrome b protein in A. bellulus was also similar to those of A. randali and A. lobidens, two other species of snapping shrimp.

== Description ==
The tiger pistol shrimp can grow to a size of up to 4 to 5 cm (1.6 to 2.0 in), not including antennae. The body is stout and opaque. The background color of the body is yellowish white or plain yellow. The patterns drawn on the cephalothorax, abdomen and tail are irregular but symmetric; their coloration varies from light brown, brownish purple to brownish orange. The legs are banded with the same colors as the body and are covered with short bristles. The antennae are red. The chelipeds are also banded, with the right being bigger and modified into a powerful weapon. By closing at extreme speed, the cheliped expels an air bubble at more than 100 kilometres per hour (62 mph) towards the prey. This action is accompanied by a loud bang.

Alpheus bellulus uses its oversized claws to produce powerful bubbles of air that stun its prey. Pressure builds up when the claw opens, and water enters a small chamber in the claw's bend. The claw quickly clamps down and a small plunger pushes water out with high pressure, releasing a high-speed bubble. This powerful sonic weapon creates a violent shock wave which can kill or knock out prey, which could be another shrimp or a small fish passing close to the tiger pistol shrimp. The sound emitted from the collapsing bubble can be up to 218 decibels, with a temperature of up to 4,800 degrees Celsius, slightly cooler than the surface of the Sun.

== Distribution ==
The tiger pistol shrimp can be found in the tropical waters of the Indo-West Pacific area.

== Habitat ==
The tiger pistol shrimp dwells in sandy, muddy and detrital substrata in shallow waters up to 20 m (66 ft).

The structure of the burrows made by A. bellulus, studied through resin casting, shows the three-dimensional shape and provides insight into the construction habits of the species.

A. bellulus relies on burrows for shelter and protection. In the beginning stage of construction, there is rapid growth in the size and dimensions of the burrow. During this phase, A. bellulus shows no interest in feeding or resting, placing total priority on burrow formation. This characteristic is similar throughout many alpheid shrimp species. A. bellulus is highly vulnerable to predation without a burrow, especially during the initial stages of burrow development, due to its limited vision and dependence on tactile cues from partner gobiid fish.

Burrows are reinforced with small pieces of shell and coral along the sides, preventing collapse. Sediment is constantly removed by A. bellulus to keep the internal burrow clean of settled deposits. Burrow production is also crucial to sediment cycling throughout the marine ecosystem, combining nutrients and debris along the seafloor.

== Feeding ==
The tiger pistol shrimp primarily feeds on small invertebrates, but may also consume detritus, macroalgae and animal carcasses found near its burrow. In symbiotic pairs, gobies have also been observed bringing food to the shrimp. Although tiger pistol shrimp are sometimes blamed for the deaths of fish in aquariums, they are generally considered unlikely to attack fish for food. In captivity, they readily accept a variety of prepared foods commonly given to aquarium shrimp, including flakes, pellets, frozen mysis shrimp, brine shrimp and finely chopped seafood.

== Behaviour ==
=== Tiger pistol shrimp and gobies ===
The tiger pistol shrimp lives in burrows in symbiosis with certain goby species such as Cryptocentrus cinctus, Amblyeleotris guttata, and Stonogobiops yasha. The shrimp digs and maintains the burrows used as dens by both animals, while the goby acts as a lookout and warns of danger the shrimp cannot easily detect because of its poor eyesight.

A study of goby fish and tiger pistol shrimp kept together in a tank found that when no other food source was available, the shrimp survived by eating the feces of the goby fish from within the burrow. This behaviour provides another example of the close partnership between the two species.

=== Goby symbiosis in Alpheus bellulus ===
The symbiotic relationship between the snapping shrimp Alpheus bellulus, typically found off the coast of Japan, and the gobiid fish Amblyeleotris japonica begins early in development and often continues into adulthood.

A. bellulus is not found in areas where the partner fish is absent and usually does not leave the burrow unless the fish is near the entrance. The shrimp stays in contact with the gobiid fish through its antennae and retreats into the burrow after noticeable movement from the fish.

In return, the gobiid fish use the burrows as shelter and nesting sites. Because both species are consistently found together and neither is commonly found in high numbers without the other, researchers have suggested that the relationship is important to the survival of both species.

=== Burrow sharing with porcelain crabs ===
Some burrows of Alpheus bellulus were also found to be shared with the porcelain crab Enosteoides lobatus, forming a three-way relationship between the shrimp, the gobiid fish, and the crab. In these observed burrows, E. lobatus stayed near the burrow entrance and followed warning signs from the gobiid fish, similar to the behaviour of A. bellulus. E. lobatus are filter feeders and benefit from abundant food sources outside the burrows due to higher rates of detritus flow caused by water movement. However, seeking refuge within the burrows offers greater protection from predators.

== In aquaria ==
The tiger pistol shrimp is considered to be one of the more popular pistol shrimp species in the marine aquarium hobby due to its subdued temperament compared to other pistol shrimp species, its relatively low cost, and its basic care requirements.

== Original publication ==
Miya, Y. & S. Miyake, 1969. Description of Alpheus bellulus sp. nov. associated with gobies from Japan (Crustacea, Decapoda, Alpheidae).— Publications from the Seto Marine Biological Laboratory 16: 307–314.
