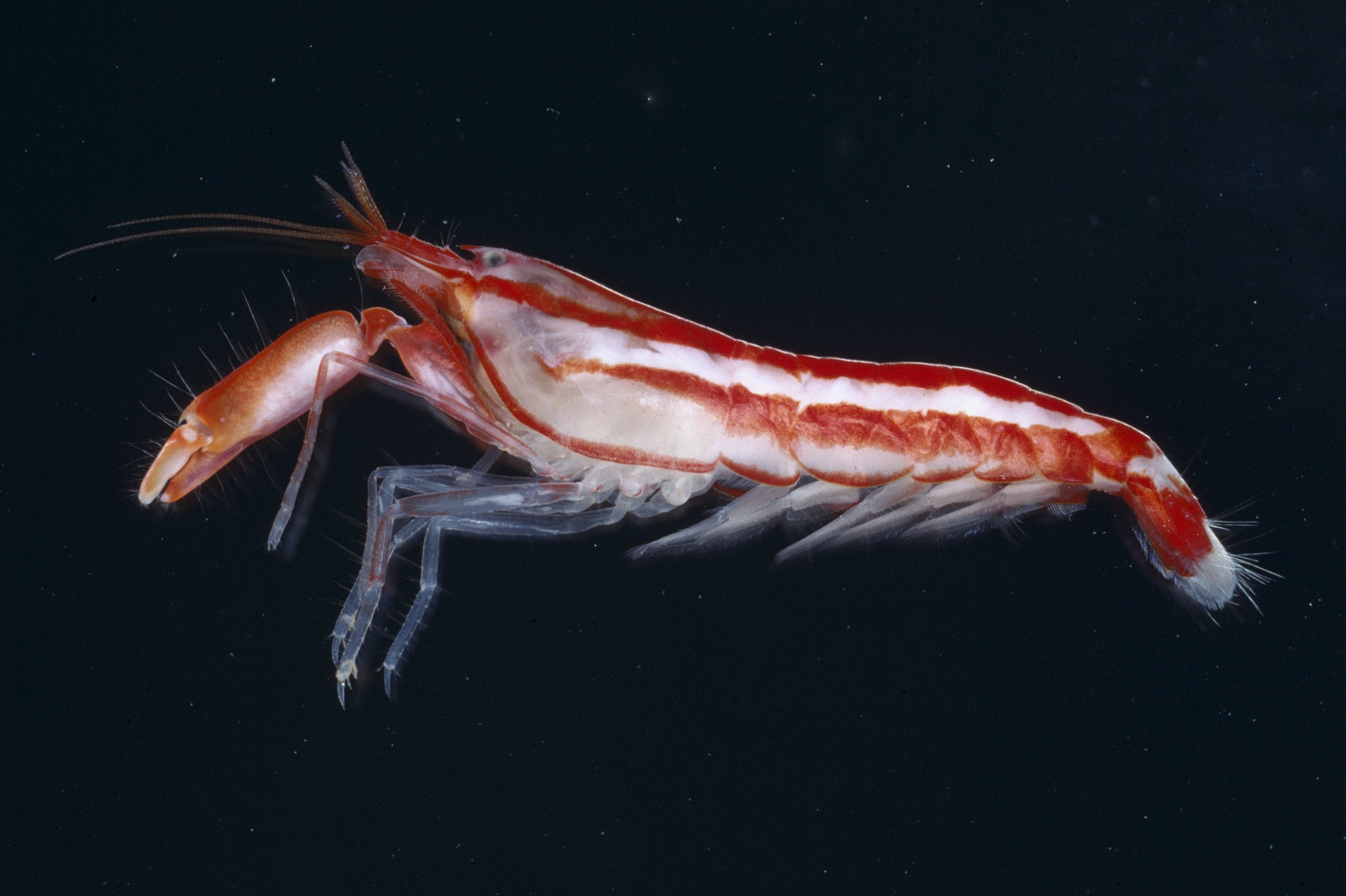

Scientific classification
- Kingdom: Animalia
- Phylum: Arthropoda
- Clade: Pancrustacea
- Class: Malacostraca
- Order: Decapoda
- Suborder: Pleocyemata
- Infraorder: Caridea
- Family: Alpheidae
- Genus: Alpheus
- Species: A. astrinx

Binomial name
- Alpheus astrinx Banner & Banner, 1982

= Alpheus astrinx =

Alpheus astrinx Temporal range: 0.012–0.0 Ma

Rare species of shrimp

Alpheus astrinx, also known as the candy-stripe pistol prawn, is a rare species of snapping shrimp found around Australia and Papua New Guinea. It has recent presence in the fossil record, having been recorded from 0.012 million years ago (Mya). The species has an acute rostrum which is roughly equal to the length of the first segment on the antennae.
