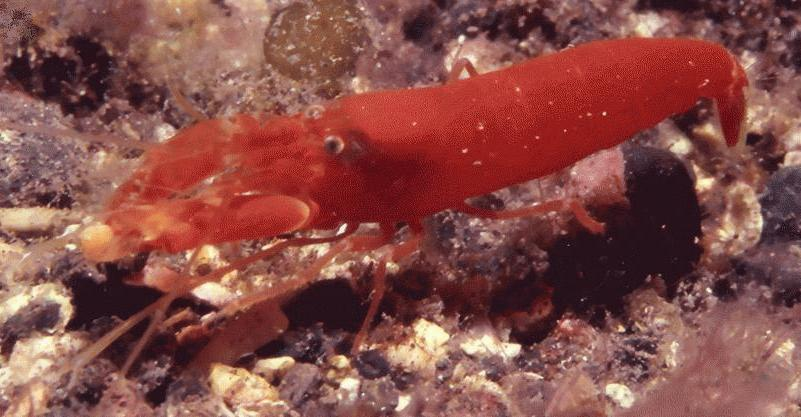

Scientific classification
- Domain: Eukaryota
- Kingdom: Animalia
- Phylum: Arthropoda
- Class: Malacostraca
- Order: Decapoda
- Suborder: Pleocyemata
- Infraorder: Caridea
- Family: Alpheidae
- Genus: Alpheus
- Species: A. macrocheles

Binomial name
- Alpheus macrocheles (Hailstone, 1835)

= Alpheus macrocheles =

Species of crustacean

Alpheus macrocheles, also known as the orange European snapping prawn, is a species of snapping shrimp within the family Alpheidae.

== Description ==
Alpheus macrocheles grow up to 35 mm long and have a cheliped morphology. The chela is highly twisted and compressed, and the dactylar articulation deviates from the perpendicular plane to the dorsal margin. There is often distinct grooves on the chela's lateral face. Most individuals of this species are bright orange, however yellow individuals also exist. Like other species within the genus Alpheus the claws of Alpheus macrocheles are asymmetrical, with one of the claws being larger than the other. The larger claw is used for hunting small prey animals and self defence against predators and their own species.

== Distribution ==
Alpheus macrocheles can be found within the English Channel along the South coast of England and France. It has also been documented in the Mediterranean Sea, the Atlantic Ocean on both sides, and even in waters around Ascension Island in the Central Atlantic. It has been recorded to also live off the coast of Spain, Portugal, Greece and the Azores Archipelago.

== Habitat ==
Alpheus macrocheles is a marine species. It can be found living underwater in fissures and hollows underneath rocks and boulders. They generally favour larger boulders on the lower shoreline. The oceans current pushes sediment such as sand into the hollow, which allows A. macrocheles to excavate tunnels. Tunnels are usually shared by a breeding pair and possess two entrances, with each entrance being guarded by an individual shrimp.
