= List of Synalpheus species =

As of June 2023, the following 168 species are recognised in the shrimp genus Synalpheus:

== A ==
- Synalpheus africanus Crosnier & Forest, 1965
- Synalpheus agelas Pequegnat & Heard, 1979
- Synalpheus albatrossi Coutière, 1909
- Synalpheus amabilis De Man, 1910
- Synalpheus amintae Ramos-Tafur & Franke-Ante, 2019
- Synalpheus anasimus Chace, 1972
- Synalpheus anceps Banner, 1956
- Synalpheus ancistrorhynchus De Man, 1909
- Synalpheus androsi Coutière, 1909
- Synalpheus ankeri Hultgren & Brandt, 2015
- Synalpheus antenor De Man, 1910
- Synalpheus antillensis Coutière, 1909
- Synalpheus apioceros Coutière, 1909
- Synalpheus arostris Wicksten, 1989

== B ==
- Synalpheus bannerorum Abele, 1975
- Synalpheus barahonensis Armstrong, 1949
- Synalpheus belizensis Anker & Tóth, 2008
- Synalpheus bispinosus De Man, 1910
- Synalpheus bituberculatus De Man, 1910
- Synalpheus biunguiculatus (Stimpson, 1860)
- Synalpheus bocas Anker & Tóth, 2008
- Synalpheus bousfieldi Chace, 1972
- Synalpheus bradleyi Verrill, 1922
- Synalpheus brevicarpus (Herrick, 1891)
- Synalpheus brevidactylus Anker & Tóth, 2008
- Synalpheus brevifrons Chace, 1972
- Synalpheus brevispinis Coutière, 1909
- Synalpheus brevrostrus Wang & Sha, 2015
- Synalpheus brooksi Coutière, 1909

== C ==
- Synalpheus carinatus (De Man, 1888)
- Synalpheus carpenteri Macdonald & Duffy, 2006
- Synalpheus cayoneptunus Hultgren & Brandt, 2015
- Synalpheus chacei Duffy, 1998
- Synalpheus chaki Ashrafi & Hultgren, 2022
- Synalpheus charon (Heller, 1861)
- Synalpheus comatularum (Haswell, 1882)
- Synalpheus congoensis Crosnier & Forest, 1965
- Synalpheus corallinus Macdonald, Hultgren & Duffy, 2009
- Synalpheus corbariae Ashrafi & Hultgren, 2022
- Synalpheus coutierei Banner, 1953
- Synalpheus cretoculatus Banner & Banner, 1979
- Synalpheus crosnieri Banner & Banner, 1983
- Synalpheus curacaoensis Schmitt, 1924

== D ==
- Synalpheus dardeaui (Ríos & Duffy, 2007)
- Synalpheus demani Borradaile, 1900
- Synalpheus digueti Coutière, 1909
- Synalpheus disparodigitus Armstrong, 1949
- Synalpheus dominicensis Armstrong, 1949
- Synalpheus dorae Bruce, 1988
- Synalpheus duffyi Anker & Tóth, 2008

== E ==
- Synalpheus echinus Banner & Banner, 1975
- Synalpheus elizabethae (Ríos & Duffy, 2007)

== F ==
- Synalpheus filidigitus Armstrong, 1949
- Synalpheus fossor (Paulson, 1875)
- Synalpheus fritzmuelleri Coutière, 1909

== G ==
- Synalpheus gambarelloides (Nardo, 1847)
- Synalpheus goodei Coutière, 1909
- Synalpheus gracilirostris De Man, 1910

== H ==
- Synalpheus haddoni Coutière, 1900
- Synalpheus harpagatrus Banner & Banner, 1975
- Synalpheus hastilicrassus Coutière, 1905
- Synalpheus heardi Dardeau, 1984
- Synalpheus hemphilli Coutière, 1909
- Synalpheus herdmaniae Lebour, 1938
- Synalpheus heroni Coutière, 1909
- Synalpheus herricki Coutière, 1909
- Synalpheus hilarulus De Man, 1910
- Synalpheus hoetjesi Hultgren, Macdonald & Duffy, 2010

== I ==
- Synalpheus idios (Ríos & Duffy, 2007)
- Synalpheus iocasta De Man, 1909
- Synalpheus iphinoe De Man, 1909
- Synalpheus irie Macdonald, Hultgren & Duffy, 2009

== J ==
- Synalpheus jedanensis De Man, 1909
- Synalpheus jejuensis Koo & Kim, 2014
- Synalpheus jinqingensis Wang & Sha, 2015

== K ==
- Synalpheus kensleyi (Ríos & Duffy, 2007)
- Synalpheus kuadramanus Hultgren, Macdonald & Duffy, 2010
- Synalpheus kusaiensis Kubo, 1940

== L ==
- Synalpheus lani Hermoso & Alvarez, 2005
- Synalpheus laticeps Coutière, 1905
- Synalpheus liui Wang & Sha, 2015
- Synalpheus lockingtoni Coutière, 1909
- Synalpheus longicarpus (Herrick, 1891)
- Synalpheus lophodactylus Coutière, 1908

== M ==
- Synalpheus macdonaldi Ashrafi & Hultgren, 2022
- Synalpheus macromanus Edmondson, 1925
- Synalpheus maxillispinus Anker & Pachelle, 2014
- Synalpheus mcclendoni Coutière, 1910
- Synalpheus merospiniger Coutière, 1908
- Synalpheus mexicanus Coutière, 1909
- Synalpheus microneptunus Hultgren, Macdonald & Duffy, 2011
- Synalpheus minus (Say, 1818)
- Synalpheus modestus De Man, 1909
- Synalpheus mortenseni Banner & Banner, 1985
- Synalpheus mulegensis Ríos, 1992
- Synalpheus mushaensis Coutière, 1908

== N ==
- Synalpheus neomeris (De Man, 1897)
- Synalpheus neptunus (Dana, 1852)
- Synalpheus nilandensis Coutière, 1905
- Synalpheus nobilii Coutière, 1909

== O ==
- Synalpheus obtusifrons Chace, 1972
- Synalpheus occidentalis Coutière, 1909
- Synalpheus odontophorus De Man, 1909
- Synalpheus orapilosus Hultgren, Macdonald & Duffy, 2010
- Synalpheus osburni Schmitt, 1933
- Synalpheus otiosus Coutière, 1908

== P ==
- Synalpheus pachymeris Coutière, 1905
- Synalpheus pandionis Coutière, 1909
- Synalpheus paradoxus Banner & Banner, 1981
- Synalpheus paralaticeps Banner & Banner, 1982
- Synalpheus paraneomeris Coutière, 1905
- Synalpheus paraneptunus Coutière, 1909
- Synalpheus parfaiti (Coutière, 1898)
- Synalpheus paulsoni Nobili, 1906
- Synalpheus paulsonoides Coutière, 1909
- Synalpheus pectiniger Coutière, 1907
- Synalpheus pentaspinosus Ashrafi, Sari & Naderloo, 2020
- Synalpheus peruvianus Rathbun, 1910
- Synalpheus pescadorensis Coutière, 1905
- Synalpheus pinkfloydi Anker, Hultgren & De Grave, 2017
- Synalpheus plumosetosus Macdonald, Hultgren & Duffy, 2009
- Synalpheus pococki Coutière, 1898

== Q ==
- Synalpheus quadriarticulatus Banner & Banner, 1975
- Synalpheus quadrispinosus De Man, 1910
- Synalpheus quinquedens Tattersall, 1921

== R ==
- Synalpheus rathbunae Coutière, 1909
- Synalpheus readi Banner & Banner, 1972
- Synalpheus recessus Abele & Kim, 1989
- Synalpheus redactocarpus Banner, 1953
- Synalpheus regalis Duffy, 1996
- Synalpheus riosi Anker & Tóth, 2008
- Synalpheus ruetzleri Macdonald & Duffy, 2006

== S ==
- Synalpheus sanctithomae Coutière, 1909
- Synalpheus sanjosei Coutière, 1909
- Synalpheus sanlucasi Coutière, 1909
- Synalpheus scaphoceris Coutière, 1910
- Synalpheus sciro Banner & Banner, 1975
- Synalpheus senegambiensis Coutière, 1908
- Synalpheus septemspinosus De Man, 1910
- Synalpheus sladeni Coutière, 1908
- Synalpheus somalia Banner & Banner, 1979
- Synalpheus spinifrons (H. Milne Edwards, 1837)
- Synalpheus spiniger (Stimpson, 1860)
- Synalpheus spongicola Banner & Banner, 1981
- Synalpheus stimpsonii (De Man, 1888)
- Synalpheus streptodactylus Coutière, 1905
- Synalpheus stylopleuron Hermoso Salazar & Hendrickx, 2006
- Synalpheus superus Abele & Kim, 1989

== T ==
- Synalpheus tenuispina Coutière, 1909
- Synalpheus thai Banner & Banner, 1966
- Synalpheus theano De Man, 1910
- Synalpheus thele Macdonald, Hultgren & Duffy, 2009
- Synalpheus tijou Banner & Banner, 1982
- Synalpheus tonkinensis Wang & Sha, 2015
- Synalpheus townsendi Coutière, 1909
- Synalpheus triacanthus De Man, 1910
- Synalpheus tricuspidatus (Heller, 1861)
- Synalpheus tridentulatus (Dana, 1852)
- Synalpheus trinitatis Anker, Tavares & Mendonça, 2016
- Synalpheus trispinosus De Man, 1910
- Synalpheus triunguiculatus (Paulson, 1875)
- Synalpheus tropidodactylus Banner & Banner, 1975
- Synalpheus tumidomanus (Paulson, 1875)
- Synalpheus tuthilli Banner, 1959

== U ==
- Synalpheus ul (Ríos & Duffy, 2007)

== W ==
- Synalpheus wickstenae Hermoso Salazar & Hendrickx, 2006
- Synalpheus williamsi Ríos & Duffy, 1999

== Y ==
- Synalpheus yano (Ríos & Duffy, 2007)
