= Synalpheus regalis =

Scientific classification
- Kingdom: Animalia
- Phylum: Arthropoda
- Clade: Pancrustacea
- Class: Malacostraca
- Order: Decapoda
- Suborder: Pleocyemata
- Infraorder: Caridea
- Family: Alpheidae
- Genus: Synalpheus
- Species: S. regalis

Binomial name
- Synalpheus regalis Duffy, 1996

Synonyms
- Zuzalpheus regalis (Duffy, 1996)

Species of crustacean

External image
- Images and further information from 'ants', Thailand

Synalpheus regalis is a species of snapping shrimp that commonly live in sponges in the coral reefs along the tropical West Atlantic. They form a prominent component of the diverse marine cryptofauna of the region. For the span of their entire lives, they live in the internal canals of the host sponge, using it as a food resource and shelter. It has been shown that colonies contain over 300 individuals, but only one reproductive female. Also, larger colony members, most of which apparently never breed, defend the colony against heterospecific intruders. This evidence points towards the first known case of eusociality in a marine animal.

The species name "regalis" comes from the Latin regalis which means royal. This likely stems from the structural hierarchy of the colonies in which only a single female produces all of the offspring.

== Taxonomy ==
Synalpheus regalis is a member of the genus Synalpheus, the second largest genus in the snapping shrimp family (Alpheidae), with over 150 species worldwide. The species was discovered by J. Emmet Duffy in 1996 on the Belize Barrier Reef. As of 2013, S. regalis is one of at least seven recognized species of eusocial shrimp. The other six are Synalpheus brooksi, Synalpheus chacei, Synalpheus elizabethae, Synalpheus filidigitus, Synalpheus microneptunus and Synalpheus rathbunae.

== Appearance ==
Synalpheus regalis is a translucent orange. The distal portion of its major chela (the pincer) is brighter orange than the rest of its body and its embryos and ovaries are pale green. Scattered red chromatophores decorate the facial region of its carapace (the region between and lateral to the eyes). Its rostrum (forward extension of the carapace) is thin and is about the same length as the triangular ocular hood, which covers the shrimps' eyestalks.

Ovigerous females are generally 2.6–3.7 mm in length and males and juveniles are approximately 2.8 mm. Externally, the females can be distinguished from the males by their ovaries; however, males and juveniles cannot be distinguished from each other.

S. regalis is morphologically similar to several other species of Synalpheus including S. elizabethae, S. rathbunae, and S. filidigitus. It is distinguishable from its close relative, the S. elizabethae, as its non-ovigerous colony members have rounded abdominal pleura compared to the S. elizabethae that have pointed abdominal pleura. S. regalis, however, has a more acute abdominal pleura, less fixed teeth, and lacks a secondary armature on its major chela compared to the S. rathbunae. The S. filidigitus males have much more rounded abdominal pleura and longer scaphocerites (lateral stabilizing fin) compared to the S. regalis.

== Habitat ==
S. regalis lives exclusively in association with sponges; however, it has only been found to associate with three sponge species: Neopetrosia proxima, Neopetrosia subtriangularis, and Hyatella intestinalis. In Jamaica, they are found in H. intestinalis, in depths of over six meters. In Belize, the only other known locality of the S. regalis, they are more commonly found in N. proxima and N. subtriangularis in addition to H. intestinalis.

They rarely cohabit sponges with other shrimps, suggesting that competition in the habitat is fierce and would explain why they are found associated exclusively with only two species of sponges. For co-inhabitance situations, S. regalis appeared to dominate the sponge, leaving the other species severely under-represented compared to cases in which S. regalis was not present. In some places such as the Bocas del Toro Archipelago, S. regalis co-occurs with close relative S. elizabethae.

The shrimp feed on the host tissues as well as on the detritus, which includes bodies of dead organisms or fecal material.

== Life cycle ==
Synalpheus regalis exhibits eusocial organization like many other species in the genus. There is one breeding female and members of the colony defend, forage, and take care of the colony. The young hatches from the eggs as a crawling larva and undergoes direct development. S. regalis goes through outbreeding, where at least one of its sexes leaves to find mates, but the details of this process are yet unknown.

== Behavior and ecology ==
=== Eusociality ===
J. Emmett Duffy, a primary investigator of S. regalis, uses the term "eusociality" to refer to the syndrome of multigenerational, cooperative colonies with strong reproductive skew (usually a single breeding female) and cooperative defense of the host sponge found in several Synalpheus species. The populations that live in sponges contain a few hundred individuals, each with two generations of kin. Also, by having just one reproductive female, colonies clearly fit the first criterion of reproductive division of labor. Until the 1990s it was taught that eusociality evolved through kin selection. After other eusocial species were discovered that contradicted the theory other hypothesis like group selection or standard natural selection theory were taken into consideration. A unifying theory is still in progress at the moment.

=== Colony organization ===
S. regalis has the largest colonies and the largest reproductive skew of all eusocial shrimp. Its colonies can consist of up to 350 organisms, who are related to each other with an average of r=0.50, with one queen. Furthermore, many colonies show heterozygote excesses. This led researchers to conclude that outbreeding is common in the S. regalis, and at least one of the sexes leaves its natal home to find mates.

The queen is the sole breeder of the colony. Studies show that there is a strong correlation between the size of the queen and the size of the colony, which implies that there is a parallel between growth of the breeding female and her colony. Furthermore, the queen is not as aggressive or active as the other adults in the colony, suggesting that she does not dominate other individuals and instead looks to them for protection.

The reason behind the reproductive skew in S. regalis is currently unknown, but a theory that explains this phenomenon in other organisms, the "majority rules" model by Reeve and Jeanne, could explain the reproductive skew in S. regalis.

In this theory, the queen dominates the colony's reproduction by being the individual that each of the other colony members are most genetically related to. The non-breeding workers are more closely related to the queen's offspring (siblings; r=0.50) than they are to offspring of another worker (nieces/nephews; r=0.25). Therefore, it will be in the best interest of their genes to prevent each other from reproducing in favor of their queen.

=== Fortress defense ===
Fortress defense is one of two modes of eusociality. Queller and Strassmann (1998) distinguished between "life insurers", which include most Hymenoptera, where cooperation reduces the risk of total reproductive failure, and "fortress defenders", where cooperation enhances the defense of a commonly held, valuable resource.

Crespi (1994) argued that three conditions must be met to explain most cases of fortress defense: a coincidence of food and shelter in an enclosed habitat, a high value of food-habitat resources that renders inhabitants vulnerable to predatory attacks, and the ability to defend the resource effectively. The strong selective pressures of enemies on kin-structured aggregations may promote evolution of specialized defenders that raise their own and the breeders' inclusive fitness by defending the colony. Because few predators can enter the narrow canals of the sponges, the greatest competition comes from enemies that are of the same or closely related species.

S. regalis lives and feeds exclusively within their hosts, therefore meeting the first condition. Also, data shows that fewer than 5% of sponges sampled were unoccupied by shrimp, which means that sponges are in short supply and subject to strong competition. Finally, the large non-breeding defenders utilize the snapping claw, a potent weapon that produces a water jet intense enough to stun small animals. S. regalis appears to reach Crespi's (1994) three criteria.

A study was conducted to observe the responses of colonies by introducing heterospecific intruders. The results were dramatic: contact between a resident and an intruder generally resulted in an intense battle, with both individuals snapping at each other with their powerful major chelae. However, contacts between residents and 'natives' were quite peaceful. S. regalis will give warnings to the intruders in the form of single snaps with their chelae. If these single snaps do not succeed in driving away the intruder, a coordinated snapping event will occur in which either a localized group or the entire colony will snap in unison. At this point the intruder will usually leave, but if it does not, for example getting stuck in the canal of a sponge, it will be killed. The larger residents were the most active and aggressive, contacting foreign intruders more than twice as often as did smaller residents, and engaging intruders in combat (snapping) ten times more often than did juveniles. The larger shrimp tend to be older than the rest of the colony, and thus they allocate their energy to defending rather than breeding. Such size- or age-related polyethism is a common aspect of labor specialization among social insects. Since most of the defenders do not breed, the only way to secure their genes in future generations is to protect their juvenile siblings, allowing them to grow to adulthood free from predation and survive long enough to reproduce. This nest defense amounts to cooperative brood care and establishes S. regalis as a eusocial species.

If fortress defense plays an important role in favoring cooperation among sponge-dwelling shrimps, it can be predicted that eusociality would enhance the ability to acquire, defend, and retain limited host resources compared to less social species. Duffy and Macdonald (2010) tested this prediction in Belize by examining how shrimp abundance correlated with sociality among species. They discovered that eusocial species are more abundant, occupy more sponges and have broader host ranges than non-social sister species.

=== Nestmate recognition ===
S. regalis are exceptionally tolerant of conspecifics within their colonies, and aggressive towards conspecifics not of their own colony. These peaceful interactions are attributable to close genetic relatedness among nestmates. Allozyme data revealed that relatedness within colonies is high, averaging 0.50, indicating that colonies in this species represent close kin groups. The existence of such groups is an important prerequisite of explanations of social evolution based on kin selection. During the intruder experiment, resident shrimp contacted foreign conspecifics less and snapped more frequently than they did when faced with a nestmate. Because nestmates are generally close kin in S. regalis, this discrimination may reflect kin recognition and may help maintain the integrity of kin-structured social colonies.

Nestmate discrimination likely involves both waterborne and contact chemical signals which have been shown to mediate sex recognition in other alpheids. The high frequency of intruder contacts with the queen may suggest that she produces pheromones like in social insects.

== See also ==
- Austroplatypus incompertus
