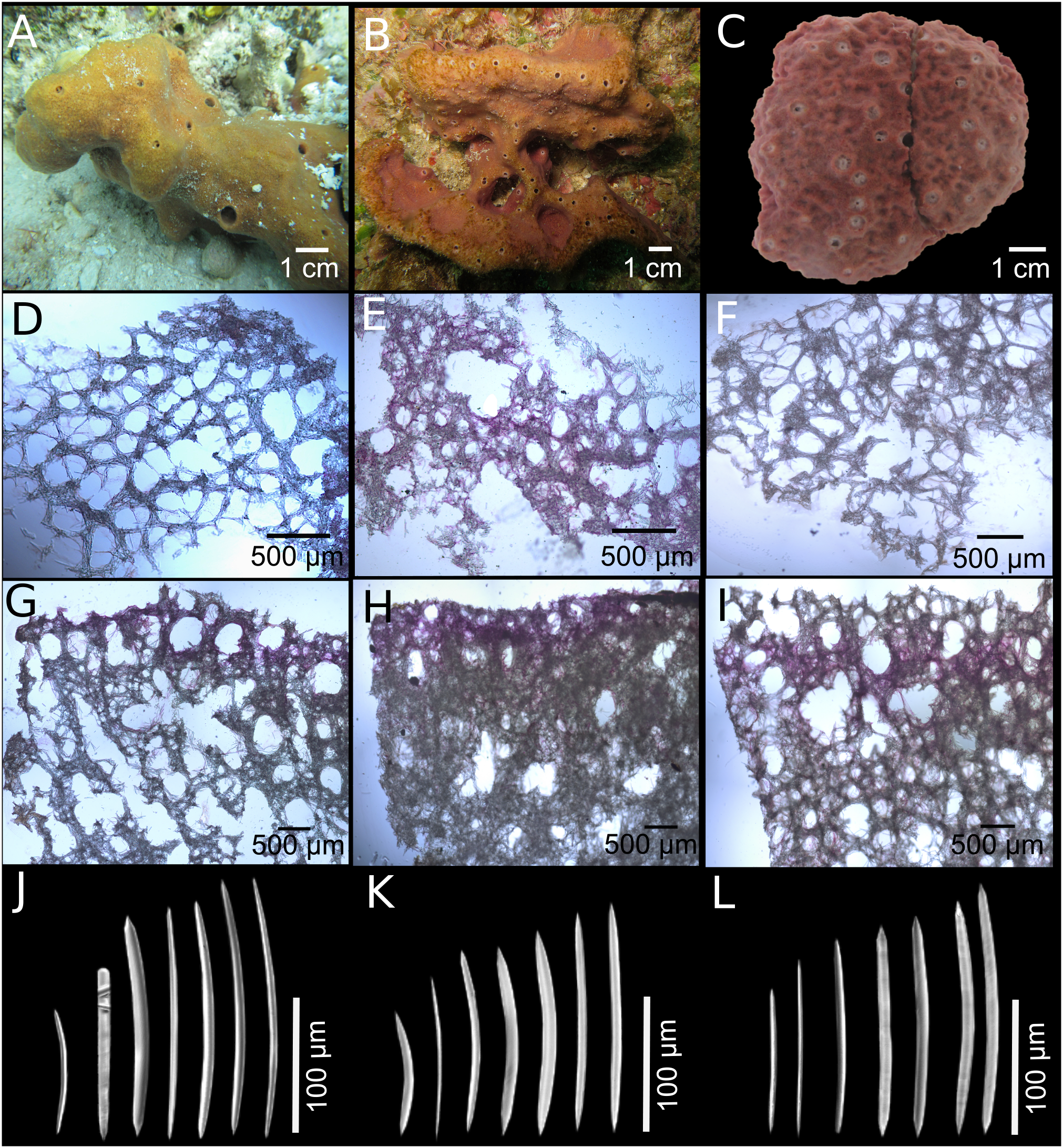

Scientific classification
- Kingdom: Animalia
- Phylum: Porifera
- Class: Demospongiae
- Order: Haplosclerida
- Family: Petrosiidae
- Genus: Neopetrosia
- Species: N. proxima

Binomial name
- Neopetrosia proxima (Duchassaing & Michelotti, 1864)

Synonyms
- Densa araminta de Laubenfels, 1934; Neofibularia proxima (Duchassaing & Michelotti, 1864); Thalysias proxima Duchassaing & Michelotti, 1864; Xestospongia proxima (Duchassaing & Michelotti, 1864)

= Neopetrosia proxima =

Species of sponge

Neopetrosia proxima is a species of marine petrosiid sponge native to the tropical and subtropical waters of the western Atlantic Ocean.

== Taxonomy ==
Neopetrosia proxima was originally described by the French naturalist Édouard Placide Duchassaing de Fontbressin and the Italian naturalist Giovanni Michelotti in 1864 as Thalysias proxima. It was transferred from the genus Xestospongia to Neopetrosia in 2005. It is classified under the family Petrosiidae in the order Haplosclerida.

== Description ==
Neopetrosia proxima is externally brown, purplish brown, or maroon in coloration, while internally it is light tan. They form thick spreading masses on the substrate (usually coral rubble). The masses are highly variable in shape, with a somewhat wrinkled (rugose) surface. The surface is generally smooth in appearance, though it has the texture of fine sandpaper when touched. The consistency is hard but not brittle. It is very difficult to cut or tear and crumbles when crushed. Injured surfaces are distinctively sticky to the touch.

The sponge mass is lobated, with regular to irregularly shaped lobes typically 3 to 5 cm (1.2 to 2.0 in) tall. Each lobe has one opening (oscule) about 2 to 5 mm (0.079 to 0.197 in) in diameter, either located flush on the surface or elevated in small chimneys. The spicules are composed solely of strongyles, cylindrical in shape with rounded ends.

== Ecology ==
N. proxima serves as a host to symbiotic cyanobacteria, as well as colonies of the eusocial snapping shrimp in the genus Synalpheus.

The larvae are positively phototrophic.

== Distribution ==
This species is found in the tropical and subtropical waters of the western Atlantic Ocean, from the Gulf of Mexico off the coast of the United States to the Caribbean Sea (including the waters off Colombia, Costa Rica, Belize, Barbados, the Greater Antilles, Hispaniola, Panama, and the Virgin Islands). They are also found off the coasts of Brazil and Venezuela.
