= Cryptopontius capitalis =

Scientific classification
- Domain: Eukaryota
- Kingdom: Animalia
- Phylum: Arthropoda
- Class: Copepoda
- Order: Siphonostomatoida
- Family: Artotrogidae
- Genus: Cryptopontius
- Species: C. capitalis

Binomial name
- Cryptopontius capitalis (Giesbrecht, 1895)

Synonyms
- Dyspontius capitalis Giesbrecht, 1895

Species of crustacean

Cryptopontius capitalis is a species of copepods in the family Artotrogidae from the North Atlantic Ocean. It is an ectoparasitic on the sponges Crella (Crella) elegans, Oscarella lobularis and Petrosia (Petrosia) ficiformis.
