= Neopetrosia subtriangularis =

Scientific classification
- Kingdom: Animalia
- Phylum: Porifera
- Class: Demospongiae
- Order: Haplosclerida
- Family: Petrosiidae
- Genus: Neopetrosia
- Species: N. subtriangularis

Binomial name
- Neopetrosia subtriangularis (Duchassaing, 1850)

Synonyms
- List: Haliclona doria de Laubenfels, 1936; Haliclona longleyi de Laubenfels, 1932; Haliclona subtriangularis (Duchassaing & Michelotti, 1864); Neopetrosia longleyi (De Laubenfels, 1932); Pachychalina rugosa (Duchassaing & Michelotti, 1864); Schmidtia aulopora Schmidt, 1870; Spongia subtriangularis Duchassaing, 1850; Thalysias rugosa Duchassaing & Michelotti, 1864; Thalysias subtriangularis (Duchassaing, 1850); Xestospongia subtriangularis (Duchassaing, 1850)

Species of sponge

Neopetrosia subtriangularis is a species of marine petrosiid sponges native to the waters off Florida and the Caribbean Sea. They superficially resemble staghorn corals.

== Taxonomy ==
Neopetrosia subtriangularis was originally described by the French naturalist Édouard Placide Duchassaing de Fontbressin in 1850 as Spongia subtriangularis. It is classified under the genus Neopetrosia of the family Petrosiidae in the order Haplosclerida.

== Description ==
Neopetrosia subtriangularis superficially resemble the staghorn coral (Acropora cervicornis) in appearance. They form clusters of interconnecting solid branches that tend to sprawl along the substrate (repent), though these branches may sometimes be solitary (arising from a flattened base) and erect.

The branches are brown, beige, yellow or orange in coloration on the external surfaces, though they may possess a greenish tinge. Internal surfaces are tan to off-white in coloration. They are usually around 28 cm (11 in) long and 2.5 cm (0.98 in) wide and may be laterally flattened. In the Bahamas, the individual branches tend to be wider, around 3 to 5 cm (1.2 to 2.0 in), than in other areas where they average at 1 to 2 cm (0.39 to 0.79 in). They are hard in consistency, but are brittle and easily break off. The surface of the branches are smooth and flat.

The openings (oscules) are round and 2 to 4 mm (0.079 to 0.157 in) in diameter, usually surrounded by a rim of paler colored (usually white or yellow) membrane. They may be located flush on the surface or elevated in small conical chimneys, around 1.3 cm (0.51 in) tall. They are distributed regularly on the upper surface of the branches, forming neat rows. Individual oscules may sometimes fuse together to form a crest. The spicules are curved cylinders, with pointed (oxea) or rounded (strongyloxea) tips at both ends.

== Ecology ==
Neopetrosia subtriangularis are found in shallow reefs and seagrass beds at depths of greater than 3 m (9.8 ft). Especially in the turbid waters of sand channels. They serve as hosts of colonies of the eusocial snapping shrimp in the genus Synalpheus.

== Distribution ==
Neopetrosia subtriangularis is found off the east and west coasts of Florida, the Bahamas, and throughout the entire Caribbean Sea.
