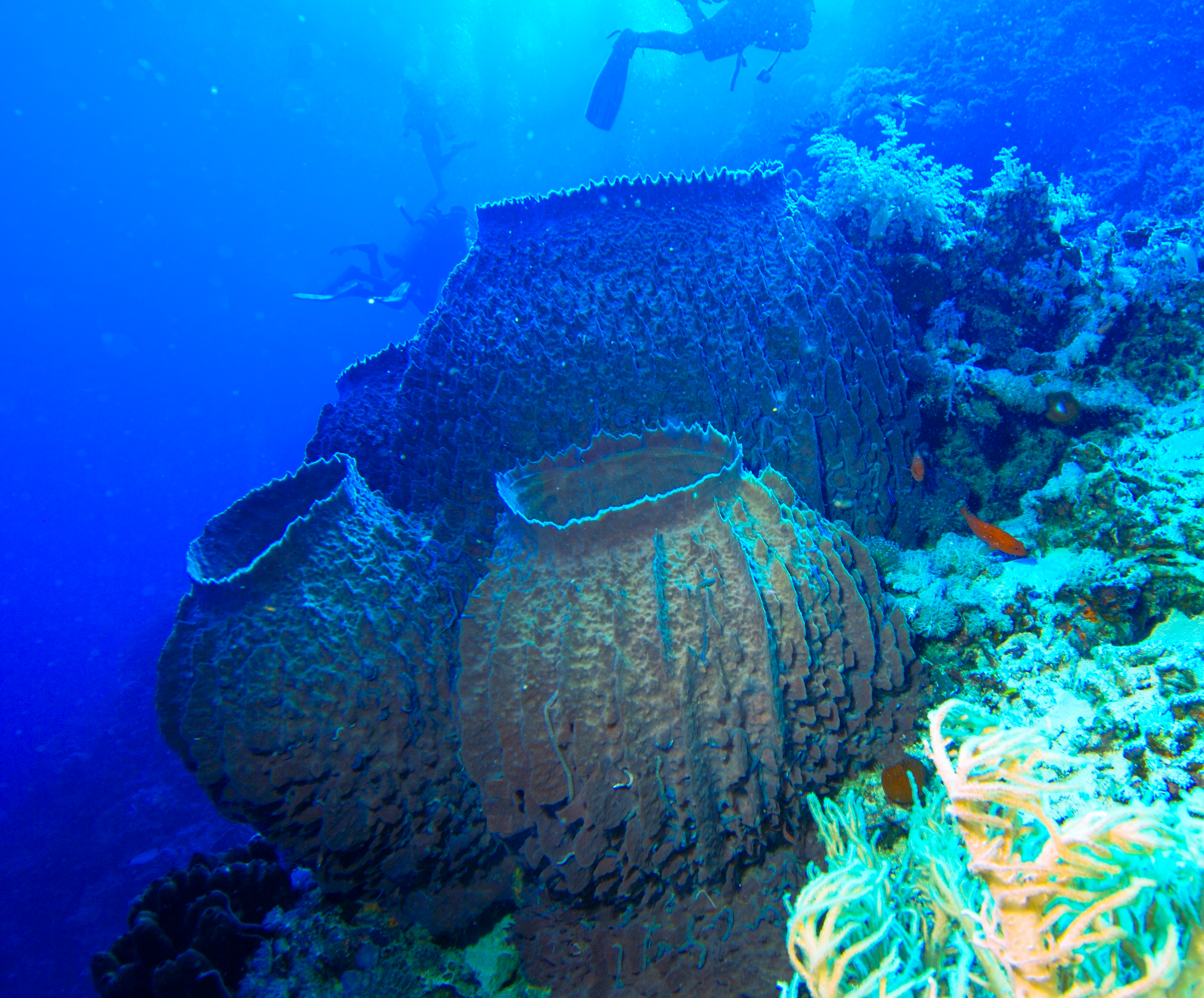

Scientific classification
- Kingdom: Animalia
- Phylum: Porifera
- Class: Demospongiae
- Order: Haplosclerida
- Family: Petrosiidae
- Genus: Xestospongia
- Species: X. testudinaria

Binomial name
- Xestospongia testudinaria Lamarck, 1815

Synonyms
- Alcyonium testudinaria Lamarck, 1813; Petrosia testudinaria Lamarck, 1815; Reniera testudinaria Lamarck, 1815; Reniera crateriformis Carter, 1882

= Xestospongia testudinaria =

Species of sponge

Xestospongia testudinaria is a species of barrel sponge in the family Petrosiidae. More commonly known as giant barrel sponges, they have the basic structure of a typical sponge. Their body is made of a reticulation of cells aggregate on a siliceous scaffold composed of small spikes called spicules. Water is taken into the inner chamber of the sponge (known as the spongocoel) through ostia (small pores created by porocytes). Flagellated choanocytes line the inner chamber and help generate water currents through the sponge.

Due to the amount of water that giant barrel sponges filter throughout their lifespan, they perform an important ecological role.

== Habitat and Niche ==
This species is found in the Philippines, Australia, western and central Indian Ocean, Indonesia, Malaya and New Caledonia. These sponges are sessile filter feeders, with a very important role in the ecosystem. Giant Barrel Sponges filter a tremendous amount of water throughout their lifespan (some living up to 2000 years) which increases water clarity, controls algae, and affects coral populations. These sponges also serve as a habitat for many other species such as other invertebrates, benthic fish, bacteria, and cyanobacteria.

== Description ==
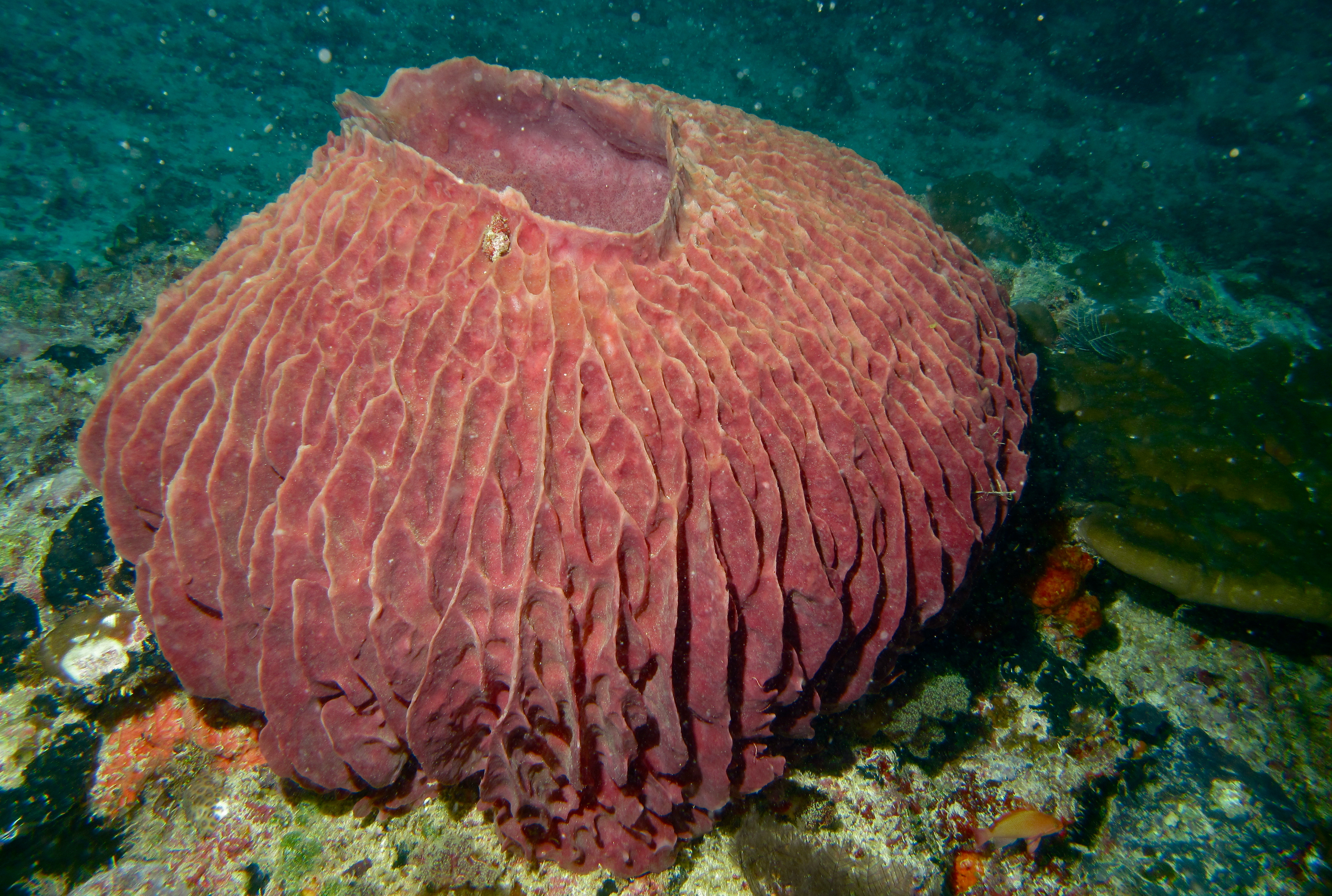

This species is maroon to pink, with the opening of the barrel pale white.

Specimens are often found emerging from an apparent common base. In the intertidal zones, this species ranges from 10 to 20 cm in diameter and are about 10 to 20 cm tall.

A bioactive peptide consisting of 13 amino acids, KENPVLSLVNGMF, has been identified from this species. The peptide was selectively toxic to human cervical cancer cells (HeLa), but non-toxic to non-cancerous, human embryonic kidney cell line (HEK 293 cells).

== Conservation ==
Currently this species is not considered endangered or threatened by any agencies, however there are a list of potential threats that may effect their survival. Among these threats include fatal diseases such as Sponge Orange Band (SOB), environmental changes, and cyclical bleaching. Researchers are unsure what the cause of SOB is, but evidence supports the hypothesis that environmental changes, rising water temperature in particular, is responsible for the disease.

== Taxonomy ==
Xestospongia testudinaria var. fistulophora Wilson, 1925

Like all sponges, Xestospongia testudinaria exhibit species-specific microbiome. Recent studies on Xestospongia testudinaria microbiome revealed that morphologically similar specimens hosted significantly different microbiomes, hinting towards the occurrence of cryptic speciation.

== See also ==
- Xestospongia muta, a similar species also called 'giant barrel sponge'
