= Aaaba =

Aaaba may refer to:

- Aaaba, a genus of sponges in the family Crellidae, synonym of Crellastrina
- Aaaba, a genus of beetles in the family Buprestidae, synonym of Aaaaba
