= Crella elegans =

Scientific classification
- Kingdom: Animalia
- Phylum: Porifera
- Class: Demospongiae
- Order: Poecilosclerida
- Family: Crellidae
- Genus: Crella
- Subgenus: Crella
- Species: C. elegans

Binomial name
- Crella elegans (Schmidt, 1862)

Synonyms
- List: Crella (Crella) elegans (Schmidt, 1862); Cribrella elegans Schmidt, 1862; Kowalewskyella gracilis Swartschewsky, 1905

Species of sponge

Crella elegans is a species of marine demosponges in the family Crellidae found in the Adriatic. It is the type species of its genus. It is the host of the ectoparasitic copepod Cryptopontius capitalis.
