= Xestospongia bergquistia =

Scientific classification
- Domain: Eukaryota
- Kingdom: Animalia
- Phylum: Porifera
- Class: Demospongiae
- Order: Haplosclerida
- Family: Petrosiidae
- Genus: Xestospongia
- Species: X. bergquistia

Binomial name
- Xestospongia bergquistia Fromont, 1991

Species of sponge

Holotype site'"`UNIQ--ref-00000006-QINU`"'

Xestospongia bergquistia is a species of barrel sponge in the family Petrosiidae first described by Jane Fromont in 1991. The species epithet, bergquistia, honours the New Zealand sponge specialist, Patricia Bergquist.

== Habitat ==
X. bergquistia occurs at depths of 5–15 m in full light on substrates of rock or dead coral.

== Description ==
X. bergquistia is an erect, red-brown, cup-shaped sponge, with vertical ridges on the outer surface. The sponge varies in size from 15 cm to 1.5 m high, with the cup at its apex forming a central hollow up to one third its height. It is a firm but springy sponge.
