= Synalpheus carpenteri =

Scientific classification
- Kingdom: Animalia
- Phylum: Arthropoda
- Clade: Pancrustacea
- Class: Malacostraca
- Order: Decapoda
- Suborder: Pleocyemata
- Infraorder: Caridea
- Family: Alpheidae
- Genus: Synalpheus
- Species: S. carpenteri

Binomial name
- Synalpheus carpenteri MacDonald & Duffy, 2006

Species of crustacean

Synalpheus carpenteri is a species of sponge-dwelling snapping shrimp described in 2006 from specimens collected from the Belizean Barrier Reef of the Exuma Islands, Bahamas, and the Atlantic coast of Panama. Its most identifying characteristic is the faint to bright orange overall color of the body. The species is named in honor of Michael Carpenter, Caribbean Coral Reef Ecosystem program, National Museum of Natural History, Smithsonian Institution, Washington, D.C.
