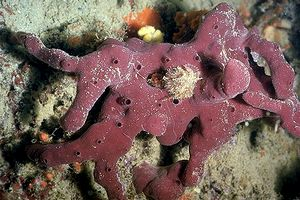
- Petrosia ficiformis is a purple brown sponge of the Mediterranean and North Atlantic

Scientific classification
- Kingdom: Animalia
- Phylum: Porifera
- Class: Demospongiae
- Order: Haplosclerida
- Family: Petrosiidae
- Genus: Petrosia
- Species: P. ficiformis

Binomial name
- Petrosia ficiformis (Poiret, 1879)

Synonyms
- List: Alcyonium distortum Lamarck, 1815; Petrosia dura (Schmidt, 1862); Petrosia ficiformis (Poiret, 1789); Rayneria dura Nardo, 1834; Reniera compacta Schmidt, 1864; Reniera dura Schmidt, 1862; Schmidtia dura (Schmidt, 1862); Schmidtia ficiformis (Poiret, 1789); Schmidtia fungiformis Balsamo Crivelli, 1863; Spongia ficiformis Poiret, 1789

= Petrosia ficiformis =

Species of sponge

Petrosia ficiformis, commonly known as the stony sponge, is a species of petrosiid sea sponge in the order Haplosclerida.

== Taxonomy ==
Petrosia ficiformis was first described by J.L.M. Poiret as Spongia ficiformers. Its name comes from the Greek: "pétra" - πέτρα - rock, "physis" - φύση - nature, "fórma" - φόρμα - shape, meaning "naturally-shaped rock". It is classified under the subgenus Petrosia of the genus Petrosia.

== Distribution ==
Petrosia ficiformis occurs in the Mediterranean Sea and in the adjacent eastern Atlantic Ocean. It is found among rocks and in caves and rock crevasses, typically deeper than 5 m (16 ft).

== Characteristics ==
Petrosia ficiformis is usually purple brown in colour due to symbiosis with photosynthetic cyanobacteria, but can be white in the absence of light. It has a compact, hard texture, with spherical oscula irregularly spread over the surface.

== Chemistry ==
Petrosia ficiformis biosynthesizes various acetylene derivatives. A characteristic example of this is petrosynol, a polyacetylene of 30 atoms, which was isolated in 1987 from this animal. It likely helps to protect the sponge from bacterial and fungal infections.

Chemical structure of petrosynol

Petrosia ficiformis is specifically known to synthesize various types of petroformynes, a class of polyhydroxylated polyacetylene fatty alcohols with cytotoxic activity. The skeleton of these toxins is formed by a hydrocarbon chain of 46 to 47 carbon atoms.

== Predators ==
Petrosia ficiformis is predated by the nudibranch Peltodoris atromaculata. This nudibranch is a specialist on Petrosia, along with the chemically similar Haliclona fulva. There is no evidence that the nudibranch uses the chemical compounds of these sponges in their own defense, as is known for many other nudibranchs.
