= Synalpheus microneptunus =

Scientific classification
- Kingdom: Animalia
- Phylum: Arthropoda
- Class: Malacostraca
- Order: Decapoda
- Suborder: Pleocyemata
- Infraorder: Caridea
- Family: Alpheidae
- Genus: Synalpheus
- Species: S. microneptunus

Binomial name
- Synalpheus microneptunus Hultgren, MacDonald, & Duffy, 2011

Species of crustacean

Synalpheus microneptunus is a species of small snapping shrimp native to the waters off the island of Barbados. It is one of at least seven known species of eusocial shrimp. They are cryptofauna, living exclusively within the network of tunnels in the sponges Neopetrosia proxima and Neopetrosia subtriangularis. They form small colonies of six to fifteen individuals, usually with only a single breeding female.

== Taxonomy ==
Synalpheus microneptunus belongs to the genus Synalpheus of the snapping shrimp family, Alpheidae. It was first described by Kristin M. Hultgren, Kenneth S. MacDonald III, and J. Emmett Duffy in 2011, from specimens collected from the Cement Factory Reef off the northwest coast of the island of Barbados.

It is one of five closely related and morpholologically very similar species in the Synalpheus paraneptunus species complex. Synalpheus microneptunus can readily be distinguished from other members of the complex by the presence of four carpal segments on each of the second pair of walking legs (pereopods) on both adult and juveniles. This is in contrast to the five segments present in other species of the S. paraneptunus complex.

Their specific name is derived from their affinity to the Synalpheus paraneptunus complex and the fact that they are the smallest member of the group in terms of body size.

== Description ==
Synalpheus microneptunus are small shrimp, with a carapace length of only 2.2 to 2.9 mm (0.087 to 0.114 in). The carapace is smooth with sparsely distributed bristles (setae). The posterior end of which has a distinct cardiac notch. The anterior spine of the carapace (rostrum) is flanked by two slightly shorter and stouter blunt spines (the ocular hoods) directly covering the eyestalks.

The body is more or less cylindrical in shape. The major first pereopod (the snapping claw) is very large, with the palm (carpus) more than twice as long as the fingers. The carpus has a small triangular spine on the outer and upper end, curving towards the movable finger (dactyl). The fixed finger is slightly shorter than the dactyl. The palm of the minor first pereopod (the feeding claw) is less than twice as long as it is wide, with the fingers shorter than the carpus. The dactyl is blade-like in shape with three teeth near the tip. The fixed finger is trowel-like in shape with a single tooth near the tip. The second to fifth pair of pereopods (the walking legs) are slender, progressively growing weaker towards the fifth pair. The second pair is distinctive for having four segments on the carpus.

The telson has two groups of two spines on the outer edges of the posterior end. In between them are six bristles (setae). On the dorsal surface of the telson are two pairs of large spines situated far from the lateral edges, and separated from each other by 35% to 50% of the width of the telson. The exopods of the uropods each have three teeth on the outer posterior margins, with a movable spine in between them, roughly in line with the central tooth.

In life, Synalpheus microneptunus have pale undistinguished coloration, with their extremities tipped by dull yellow-orange. The ovaries and embryos in breeding females are green.

== Ecology ==
Like most members of the genus Synalpheus found in the western Atlantic, Synalpheus microneptunus are exclusively associated with sponges. They are cryptofaunal, being rarely seen by humans despite their relative abundance because they spend almost their entire lives within the complex network of tunnels of their host sponges, feeding on sponge tissue.

Synalpheus microneptunus is one of at least seven known species of eusocial shrimp—the only known marine animals to exhibit eusociality. Synalpheus microneptunus are only found in the sponges Neopetrosia proxima and Neopetrosia subtriangularis, forming small colonies averaging at six individuals, with a maximum of fifteen individuals. The colonies usually have a single breeding female (the queen). The rest of the individuals in the colony (all of them close kin) are non-ovigerous "defenders", who cooperatively defend the queen and their nest from invaders (usually conspecifics or congeners). Like other alpheid shrimps, they use specialized enlarged claws that can produce jets of water capable of stunning small animals.

== Distribution ==
Synalpheus microneptunus is only known from the waters off the island of Barbados. In addition to the type locality, the Cement Factory Reef, more individuals were recovered from Brandon's beach, Breach Reef, and Spawnee Reef (all of which are off the western coast of the island).
