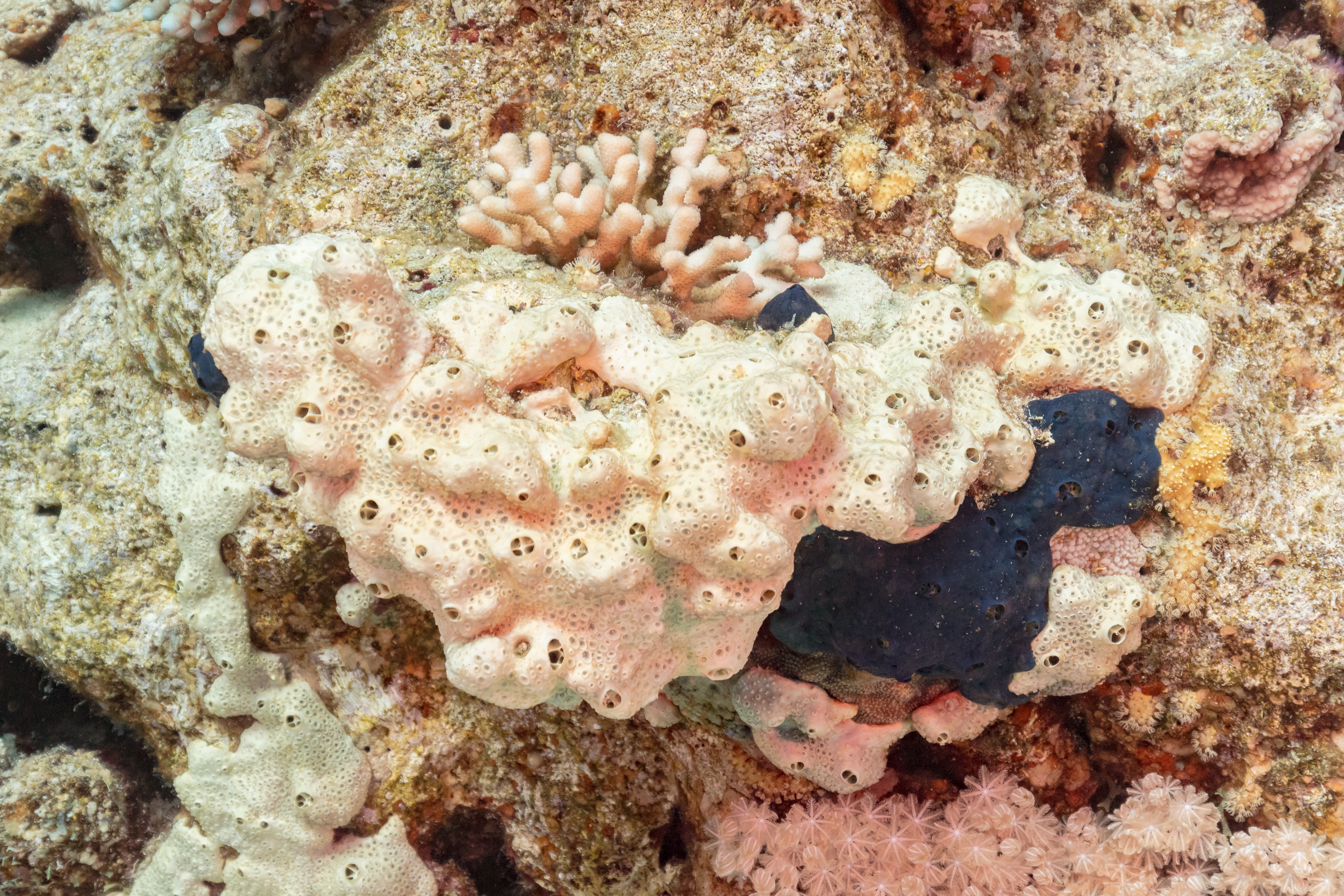
- Crella cyathophora with Hemimycale arabica in the Red Sea

Scientific classification
- Kingdom: Animalia
- Phylum: Porifera
- Class: Demospongiae
- Order: Poecilosclerida
- Family: Crellidae
- Genus: Crella; Gray, 1867

Type species
- Crella elegans Schmidt, 1862

Species
- many (59)

= Crella =

Genus of sponges

Crella is a genus of marine demosponges in the family Crellidae.

== Subgenera ==
- Crella (Crella) Gray, 1867
- Crella (Grayella) Carter, 1869
- Crella (Pytheas) Topsent, 1890
- Crella (Yvesia) Topsent, 1890

== Species ==
- Crella acanthosclera (Lévi & Lévi, 1983)
- Crella aceratospiculum (Carter, 1880)
- Crella affinis (Brøndsted, 1924)
- Crella akraleitae (Brøndsted, 1932)
- Crella alba (Vacelet, 1969)
- Crella albula (Bowerbank, 1866)
- Crella atra (Topsent, 1890)
- Crella aurantiaca Bertolino, Calcinai & Pansini, 2009
- Crella basispinosa Burton, 1931
- Crella beglingerae van Soest, 2009
- Crella brasiliensis Moraes, 2011
- Crella caespes (Ehlers, 1870)
- Crella carnosa (Topsent, 1904)
- Crella carteri Van Soest & Hooper, 2020
- Crella chelifera van Soest, 1984
- Crella commensalis Whitelegge, 1906
- Crella compressa (Carter, 1886)
- Crella crassa (Hentschel, 1914)
- Crella cyathophora Carter, 1869
- Crella digitifera (Lévi, 1959)
- Crella dispar (Topsent, 1927)
- Crella donsi Burton, 1931
- Crella elegans (Schmidt, 1862)
- Crella erecta (Lévi, 1963)
- Crella fallax (Topsent, 1890)
- Crella fristedti (Dendy, 1924)
- Crella fusifera Sarà, 1969
- Crella gelida (Lundbeck, 1910)
- Crella gerzensteini (Swartschevsky, 1906)
- Crella gracilis (Alander, 1942)
- Crella guernei (Topsent, 1890)
- Crella hanseni (Topsent, 1890)
- Crella hennequinae Goodwin, Berman & Hendry, 2019
- Crella incrustans (Carter, 1885)
- Crella jaegerskioeldi Alander, 1937
- Crella linguifera (Topsent, 1890)
- Crella mammillata (Arnesen, 1903)
- Crella mollior Topsent, 1925
- Crella nodulosa Sarà, 1959
- Crella novaezealandiae (Bergquist & Fromont, 1988)
- Crella papillata (Lévi, 1958)
- Crella papillosa (Schmidt, 1870)
- Crella pertusa (Topsent, 1890)
- Crella plana Picton & Goodwin, 2007
- Crella polymastia (Thiele, 1903)
- Crella pulvinar (Schmidt, 1868)
- Crella pyrula (Carter, 1876)
- Crella richardi (Topsent, 1890)
- Crella ridleyi (Topsent, 1890)
- Crella rosea (Topsent, 1892)
- Crella rubiginosa (Schmidt, 1862)
- Crella schottlaenderi (Arndt, 1913)
- Crella shimonii Pulitzer-Finali, 1993
- Crella sigmata Topsent, 1925
- Crella spinulata (Hentschel, 1911)
- Crella stylifera Hentschel, 1914
- Crella topsenti (Babiç, 1922)
- Crella triplex (Koltun, 1970)
- Crella tubifex (Hentschel, 1914)
- Crella ula (de Laubenfels, 1950)
