= Pinkfloydia =

Scientific classification
- Kingdom: Animalia
- Phylum: Arthropoda
- Subphylum: Chelicerata
- Class: Arachnida
- Order: Araneae
- Infraorder: Araneomorphae
- Family: Tetragnathidae
- Genus: Pinkfloydia; Hormiga & Dimitrov, 2011

Type species
- P. harveyi Dimitrov & Hormiga, 2011

Species
- P. harveyi Dimitrov & Hormiga, 2011 – Australia (Western Australia); P. rixi Hormiga, 2017 – Australia (New South Wales)

Genus of spiders

Pinkfloydia is a genus of small Australian long-jawed orb-weavers, reaching a maximum lengths of about 4.5 millimetres (0.18 in). It was first described by D. Dimitrov & G. Hormiga in 2011, and contains two species, found in New South Wales and Western Australia: P. harveyi and P. rixi. They have a unique rounded, cone-shaped head structure with one pair of large eyes and three pairs of smaller eyes. The genus is named after British rock band Pink Floyd.

== Description ==
P. harveii is a species of tiny brown spiders, with individuals ranging from 2.75 to 4.5 mm (0.11 to 0.18 in) in total body length, with females reaching larger maximum sizes than males. The eight eyes are situated on an elevated, rounded protuberance of the cephalothorax, with a one pair of eyes (the posterior median eyes) greatly enlarged compared to the other three pair. The elevated protuberance is unique among tetragnathid spiders, and other unusual features of the male pedipalps warranted the designation of a new genus with a name evocative of its uniqueness: Pinkfloydia was named by biologists Dimitar Dimitrov and Gustavo Hormiga after British rock band Pink Floyd, noting "In its heyday Pink Floyd was an innovative group that created music which was an eclectic mixture of styles... Pinkfloydia has very unusual morphological features and its name aims to reflect its uniqueness." The species name harveii honors biologist Mark S. Harvey of the Western Australian Museum who collected specimens as early as 1990, including the holotype specimen, the primary specimen used in describing the species.

== Distribution and ecology ==
P. harveii is known from coastal areas of the state of Western Australia, with a range extending from Lesueur National Park in the northwest to Bremer Bay in the southeast.

The natural history of P. harveii is poorly known. Horizontal webs of juveniles have been described, measuring 50–90 mm (2.0–3.5 in) wide.

== Classification ==
Pinkfloydia is a member of the Tetragnathidae, a globally distributed family containing around 1,000 species with about 30 species in Australia. Based on morphological, behavioural, and DNA similarities, Pinkfloydia is classified within a group of tetragnathids native to Australia and New Zealand known as the "Nanometa clade", which includes species of Nanometa and Orsinome sarasini.

== See also ==
- Synalpheus pinkfloydi
- List of organisms named after famous people (born 1925–1949)
