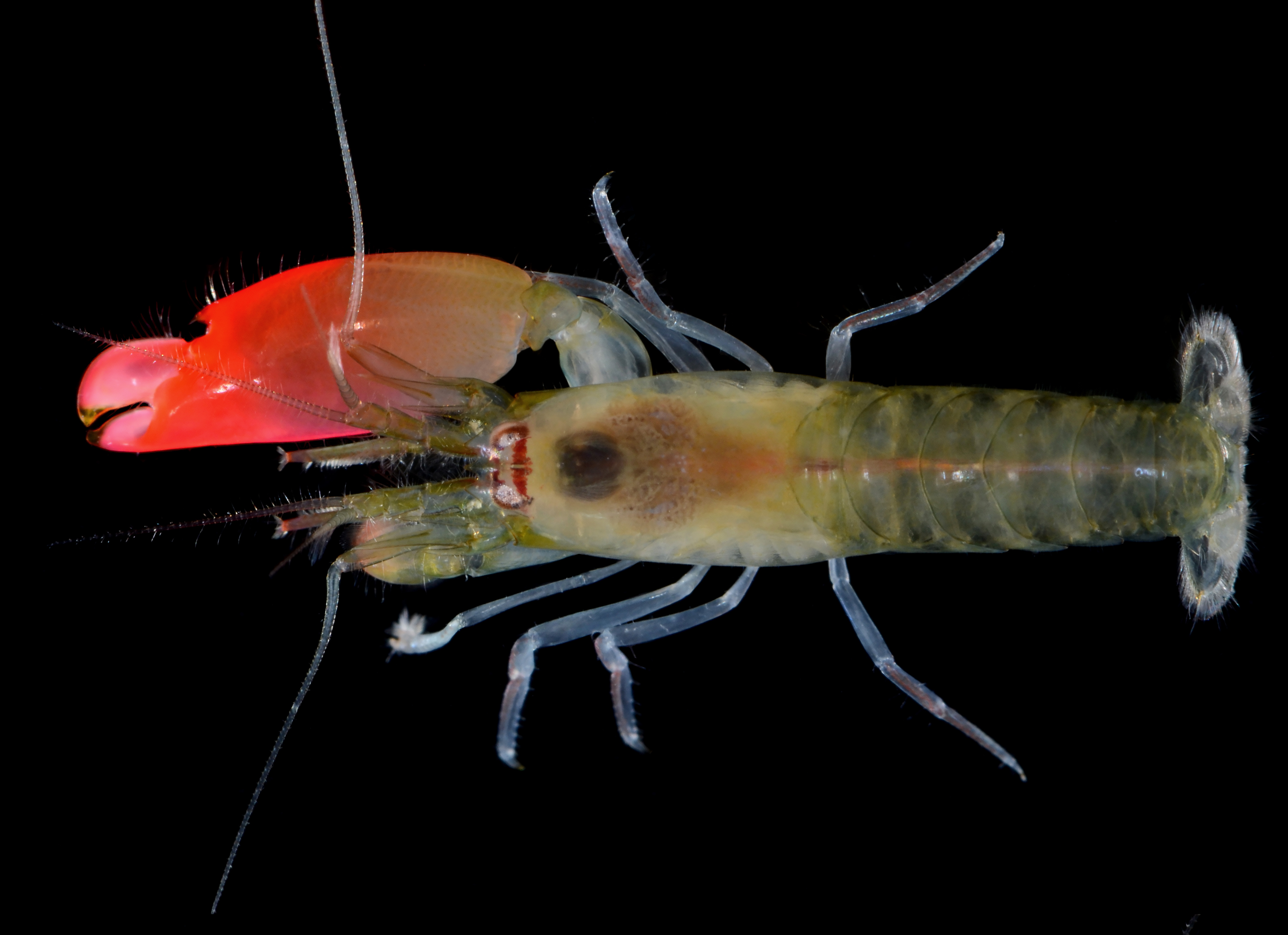

Scientific classification
- Kingdom: Animalia
- Phylum: Arthropoda
- Class: Malacostraca
- Order: Decapoda
- Suborder: Pleocyemata
- Infraorder: Caridea
- Family: Alpheidae
- Genus: Synalpheus
- Species: S. pinkfloydi

Binomial name
- Synalpheus pinkfloydi Anker, Hultgren, De Grave, 2017

= Synalpheus pinkfloydi =

Species of snapping shrimp

Synalpheus pinkfloydi, the Pink Floyd pistol shrimp, is a species of snapping shrimp in the genus Synalpheus. Described in 2017, it was named after the rock band Pink Floyd, in part because it has a distinctive "bright pink-red claw". The sound it makes by snapping the claw shut reaches 210 decibels, and can kill nearby small fish.

The type material, collected near the Las Perlas Archipelago, in Panama Bay, as part of the Smithsonian Tropical Research Institute's "Comparative and experimental studies of crustacean morphology and development" project, is now in the collections of the Museum of Zoology of the University of São Paulo, and of the Oxford University Museum of Natural History.

S. pinkfloydi, found on the eastern Pacific, is related and visually similar to the western Atlantic S. antillensis with a 10.2% sequence divergence in the cytochrome c oxidase subunit I gene.

In a nod to the species' namesake, the paper describing it said it is "unlikely to occur on the Dark Side of the Moon due to lack of suitable habitat".

== See also ==
- Pinkfloydia
- List of organisms named after famous people (born 1925–1949)
- Pink Floyd
