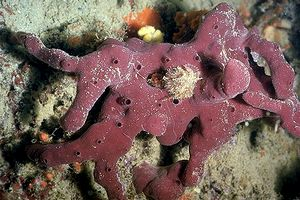
- Petrosia ficiformis

Scientific classification
- Kingdom: Animalia
- Phylum: Porifera
- Class: Demospongiae
- Order: Haplosclerida
- Family: Petrosiidae
- Genus: Petrosia; Vosmaer, 1885

= Petrosia =

Genus of sponges

Petrosia is a benthic genus of sponges belonging to the family Petrosiidae.

== Diet ==
They are filter feeders, and their diet is composed of microorganisms, including bacteria, fungi, plankton, and unicellular algae. Certain species can also absorb dissolved organic matter directly from the water. Other species host symbiotic cyanobacteria, which can provide additional nutrition via photosynthesis.

== Distribution ==
The genus has an almost cosmopolitan distribution, with species found in habitats from temperate to tropical waters and from the intertidal zone to deep waters.

== Description ==
Petrosia comprises sponges with a characteristic hard, stony, and brittle texture, primarily due to their dense network of siliceous spicules. While the group is morphologically diverse—exhibiting forms such as branching, cylindrical, globular, or bowl-shaped structures—the internal skeleton structure is a more consistent classifying feature. The surface of these sponges]p is typically rough or granular and punctuated by numerous, often small and scattered, oscules. The spicules, which can be seen under a microscope, are generally long, slightly curved rods with pointed or rounded ends. The coloration of Petrosia is variable; many species are dark reds, browns, or blacks, but some exhibit bright, vivid colors like yellow, often influenced by the presence of symbiotic cyanobacteria.

== Species ==
1. Petrosia (Petrosia) australis Bergquist & Warne, 1980
2. Petrosia (Petrosia) borealis (Lambe, 1895)
3. Petrosia (Petrosia) brachysclera Lévi & Lévi, 1989
4. Petrosia (Petrosia) canariensis de Weerdt & van Soest, 1986
5. Petrosia (Petrosia) capsa Desqueyroux-Faúndez, 1987
6. Petrosia (Petrosia) clavata (Esper, 1794)
7. Petrosia (Petrosia) crassa (Carter, 1876)
8. Petrosia (Petrosia) cretacea (Schmidt, 1870)
9. Petrosia (Petrosia) crustata Wilson, 1925
10. Petrosia (Petrosia) densissima Dendy, 1905
11. Petrosia (Petrosia) elephantotus Ilan, Gugel & van Soest, 2004
12. Petrosia (Petrosia) ernesti Goodwin & Downey, 2021
13. Petrosia (Petrosia) expansa (Thiele, 1903)
14. Petrosia (Petrosia) ficiformis (Poiret, 1789)
15. Petrosia (Petrosia) granifera Desqueyroux-Faúndez, 1987
16. Petrosia (Petrosia) hebes Lendenfeld, 1888
17. Petrosia (Petrosia) hoeksemai de Voogd & van Soest, 2002
18. Petrosia (Petrosia) incrustata (Alcolado & Gotera, 1986)
19. Petrosia (Petrosia) intermedia (Czerniavsky, 1880)
20. Petrosia (Petrosia) lignosa Wilson, 1925
21. Petrosia (Petrosia) mammiformis Dendy, 1922
22. Petrosia (Petrosia) massiva Lehnert & van Soest, 1996
23. Petrosia (Petrosia) microxea (Vacelet, Vasseur & Lévi, 1976)
24. Petrosia (Petrosia) nigricans Lindgren, 1897
25. Petrosia (Petrosia) pellasarca (de Laubenfels, 1934)
26. Petrosia (Petrosia) pigmentosa Fromont, 1991
27. Petrosia (Petrosia) plana Wilson, 1925
28. Petrosia (Petrosia) pluricrustata Lévi & Lévi, 1983
29. Petrosia (Petrosia) pulvilla (Thiele, 1903)
30. Petrosia (Petrosia) puna de Laubenfels, 1951
31. Petrosia (Petrosia) punctata Lévi & Lévi, 1983
32. Petrosia (Petrosia) raphida Boury-Esnault, Pansini & Uriz, 1994
33. Petrosia (Petrosia) revizee Rocha, Moraes, Salani & Hajdu, 2021
34. Petrosia (Petrosia) seychellensis Dendy, 1922
35. Petrosia (Petrosia) shellyi Pulitzer-Finali, 1993
36. Petrosia (Petrosia) solida Hoshino, 1981
37. Petrosia (Petrosia) solusstrongyla Hoshino, 1981
38. Petrosia (Petrosia) spheroida Tanita, 1967
39. Petrosia (Petrosia) truncata Ridley & Dendy, 1886
40. Petrosia (Petrosia) ushitsuensis Tanita, 1963
41. Petrosia (Petrosia) volcano Hoshino, 1976
42. Petrosia (Petrosia) weinbergi van Soest, 1980
