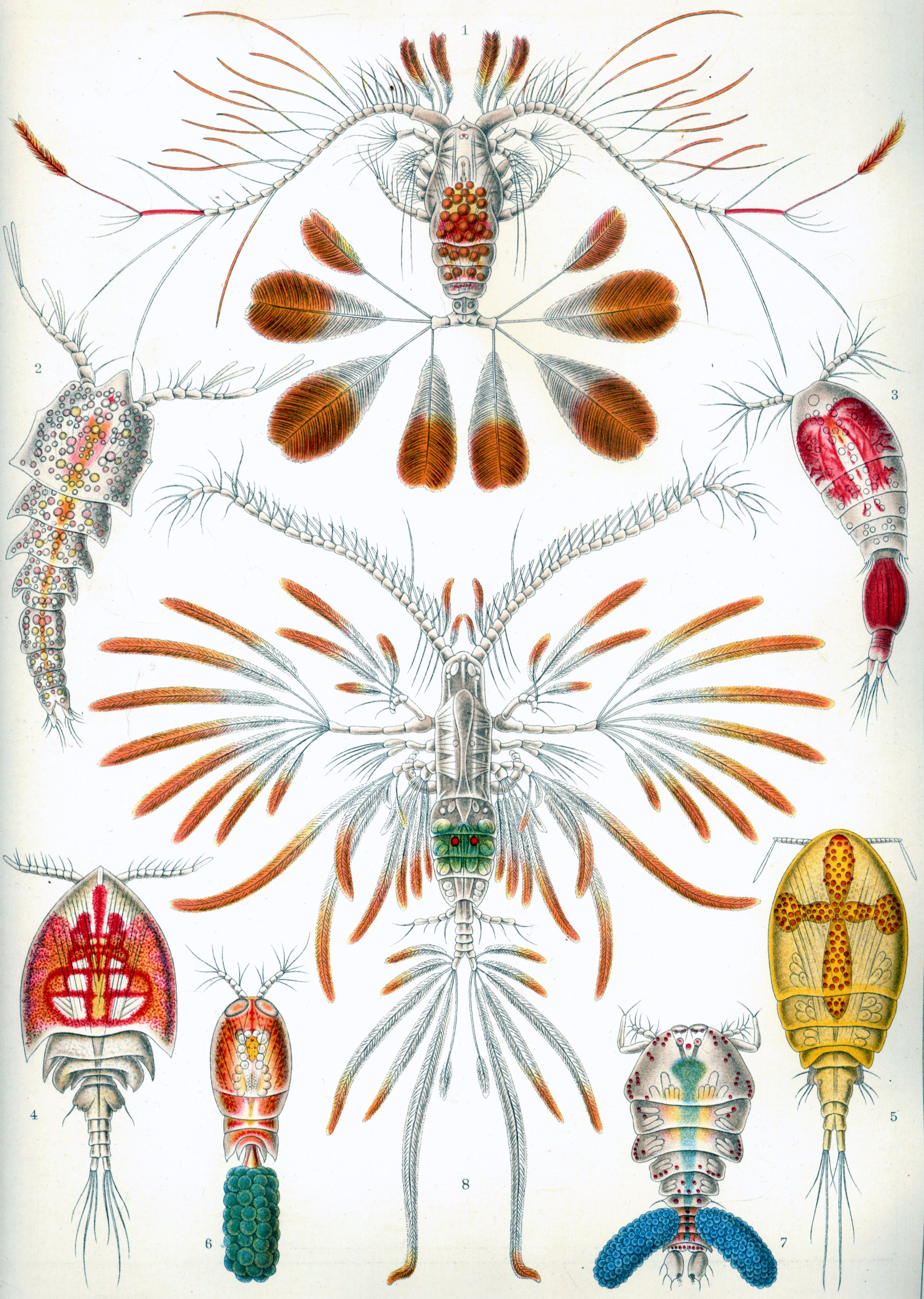
- Ernst Haeckel, 1904, Kunstformen der Natur (1904), plate 56: Copepod; 4. Cryptopontius thorelli Giesbrecht, 1899, female

Scientific classification
- Domain: Eukaryota
- Kingdom: Animalia
- Phylum: Arthropoda
- Class: Copepoda
- Order: Siphonostomatoida
- Family: Artotrogidae
- Genus: Cryptopontius; Giesbrecht, 1899

Type species
- Cryptopontius thorelli (Giesbrecht, 1895)

Species
- See text

= Cryptopontius =

Genus of crustaceans

Cryptopontius is a genus of copepods in the family Artotrogidae.

== Species ==
- Cryptopontius acutus Kim I.H., 2007
- Cryptopontius aesthetascus Neves & Johnsson, 2008
- Cryptopontius ascidius Kim I.H., 1996
- Cryptopontius brevicaudatus (Brady, 1899)
- Cryptopontius brevifurcatus (Giesbrecht, 1895)
- Cryptopontius capitalis (Giesbrecht, 1895)
- Cryptopontius digitatus Kim I.H., 1996
- Cryptopontius donghaensis Kim I.H., 1996
- Cryptopontius expletus Neves & Johnsson, 2008
- Cryptopontius gracilis C. B. Wilson, 1932
- Cryptopontius graciloides Ummerkutty, 1962
- Cryptopontius ignotus (Brady, 1910)
- Cryptopontius latus (Brady, 1910)
- Cryptopontius longipes Nicholls, 1944
- Cryptopontius madeirensis Johnsson, 2001
- Cryptopontius minor Stock, 1965
- Cryptopontius orientalis Ummerkutty, 1962
- Cryptopontius paracapitalis Nicholls in Eiselt, 1962
- Cryptopontius pentadikos Farias, Neves & Johnsson, 2020
- Cryptopontius phyllogorgius Farias, Neves & Johnsson, 2020
- Cryptopontius proximus Nicholls, 1944
- Cryptopontius quinquesetus Kim I.H., 1996
- Cryptopontius ricinius Malt, 1991
- Cryptopontius similis Nicholls, 1944
- Cryptopontius tanacredii Johnsson, Rocha & Boyko, 2002
- Cryptopontius tenuis (Giesbrecht, 1895)
- Cryptopontius thorelli (Giesbrecht, 1895)
- Cryptopontius innominatus Brady, 1910 accepted as Myzopontius innominatus (Brady, 1910)
- Cryptopontius latus Nicholls, 1944 accepted as Cryptopontius paracapitalis Nicholls in Eiselt, 1962
