= Neopetrosia =

Scientific classification
- Kingdom: Animalia
- Phylum: Porifera
- Class: Demospongiae
- Order: Haplosclerida
- Family: Petrosiidae
- Genus: Neopetrosia de Laubenfels, 1932

Type species
- Haliclona longleyi de Laubenfels, 1932

Species
- See text

Synonyms
- Densa de Laubenfels, 1934

Genus of sponges

Neopetrosia is a genus of marine petrosiid sponges. It was first established by the American spongiologist Max Walker de Laubenfels in 1932. It contains these 27 species:

- Neopetrosia carbonaria (Lamarck, 1814)
- Neopetrosia chaliniformis (Thiele, 1899)
- Neopetrosia compacta (Ridley & Dendy, 1886)
- Neopetrosia contignata (Thiele, 1899)
- Neopetrosia cristata Vicente, Ríos, Zea & Toonen, 2019
- Neopetrosia cylindrica (Lamarck, 1815)
- Neopetrosia delicatula (Dendy, 1905)
- Neopetrosia dendrocrevacea Vicente, Ríos, Zea & Toonen, 2019
- Neopetrosia densissima (Wilson, 1904)
- Neopetrosia dominicana (Pulitzer-Finali, 1986)
- Neopetrosia dutchi Van Soest, Meesters & Becking, 2014
- Neopetrosia eurystomata Van Soest, Meesters & Becking, 2014
- Neopetrosia granulosa (Wilson, 1925)
- Neopetrosia halichondrioides Dendy, 1905
- Neopetrosia massa (Ridley & Dendy, 1886)
- Neopetrosia ovata Van Soest, Meesters & Becking, 2014
- Neopetrosia perforata (Lévi, 1959)
- Neopetrosia problematica (de Laubenfels, 1930)
- Neopetrosia proxima (Duchassaing & Michelotti, 1864)
- Neopetrosia rava (Thiele, 1899)
- Neopetrosia retiderma (Dendy, 1922)
- Neopetrosia rosariensis (Zea & Rützler, 1983)
- Neopetrosia sapra (de Laubenfels, 1954)
- Neopetrosia seriata (Hentschel, 1912)
- Neopetrosia sigmafera Vicente, Ríos, Zea & Toonen, 2019
- Neopetrosia similis (Ridley & Dendy, 1886)
- Neopetrosia subtriangularis (Duchassaing, 1850)
- Neopetrosia sulcata Santos, Sandes, Cabral & Pinheiro, 2016
- Neopetrosia tenera (Carter, 1887)
- Neopetrosia truncata (Ridley & Dendy, 1886)
- Neopetrosia tuberosa (Dendy, 1922)
- Neopetrosia vanilla (de Laubenfels, 1930)
- Neopetrosia zumi (Ristau, 1978)
