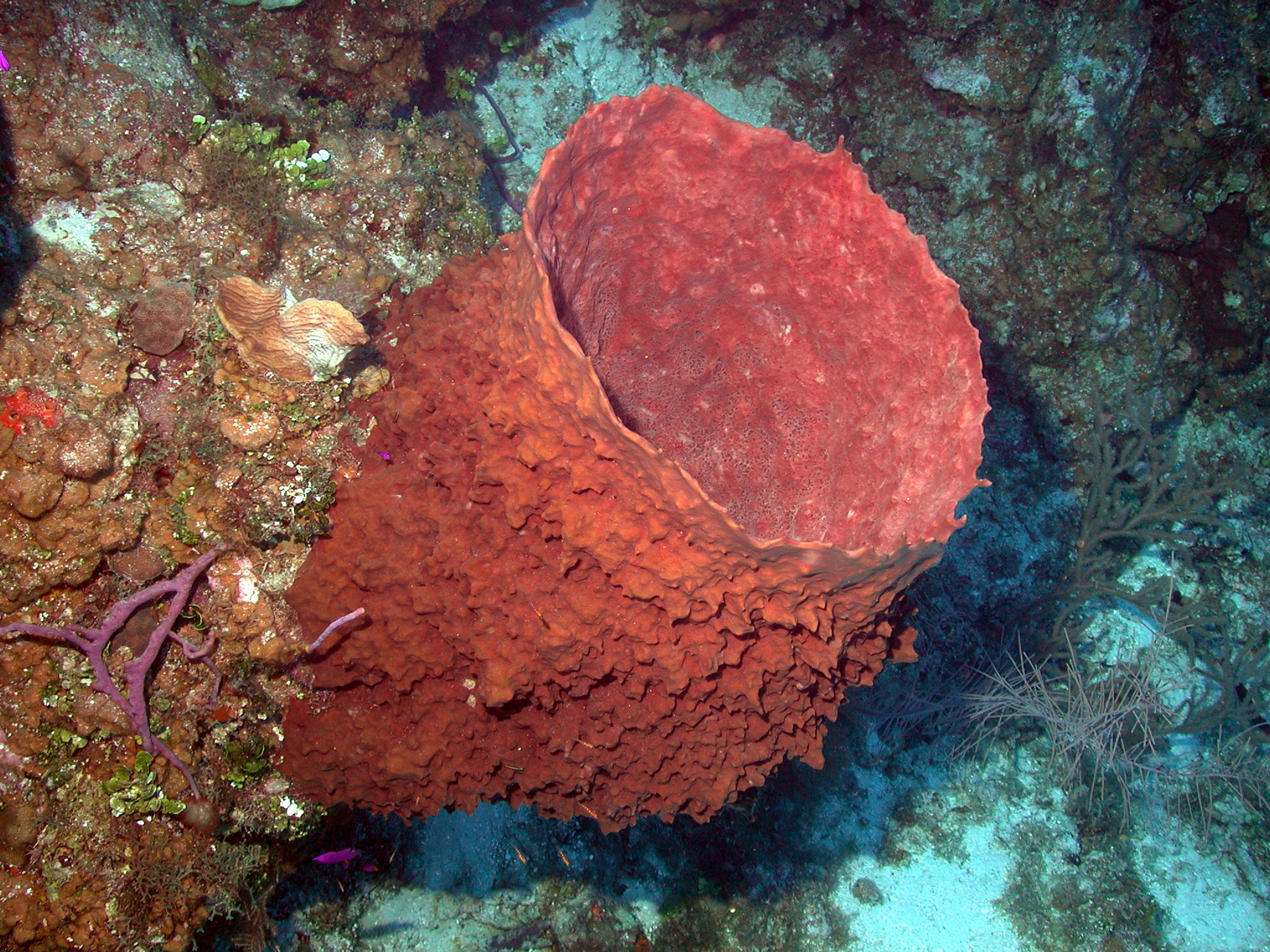

Conservation status
- Not evaluated (IUCN 3.1)

Scientific classification
- Kingdom: Animalia
- Phylum: Porifera
- Class: Demospongiae
- Order: Haplosclerida
- Family: Petrosiidae
- Genus: Xestospongia
- Species: X. muta

Binomial name
- Xestospongia muta (Schmidt, 1870)

Synonyms
- Petrosia muta (Schmidt, 1870); Schmidtia muta Schmidt, 1870

= Giant barrel sponge =

Species of sponge

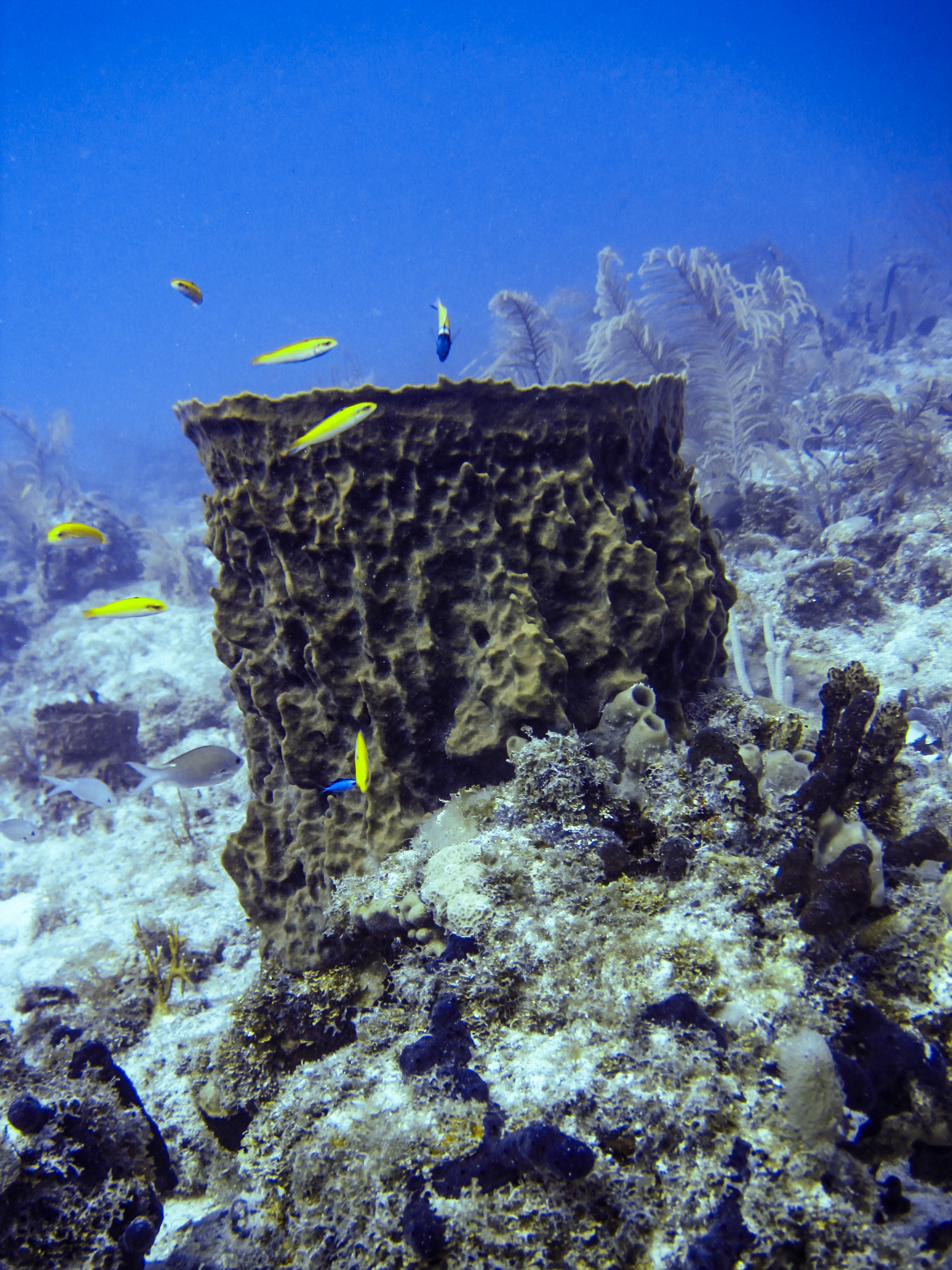
a giant barrel sponge in the Florida Keys National Marine Sanctuary

The giant barrel sponge (Xestospongia muta) is the largest species of sponge found growing on Caribbean coral reefs. It is common at depths greater than 10 metres (33 ft) down to 120 metres (390 ft) and can reach a diameter of 1.8 metres (6 feet). It is typically brownish-red to brownish-gray in color, with a hard or stony texture.

The giant barrel sponge has been called the "redwood of the reef" because of its large size and its long lifespan, which can be more than 2,000 years. It is, perhaps, the best-studied species of sponge in the sea; a population on Conch Reef, in the Florida Keys, has been monitored and studied since 1997.

== Description ==
The giant barrel sponge is variable in form. It is very large and firm, typically being barrel-shaped, with a cone-shaped cavity at the apex known as the osculum. However, some individuals within the same population may be low and squat or relatively tall and thin. Similarly, the surface can range from smooth to rough, rugged, and irregular, sometimes with buttresses. In shallow water, the color is brownish-red to brownish-gray; but, at greater depths and in caves and under-hangs, or when the sponge is undergoing cyclic bleaching events, it is pinkish or white.

== Distribution, habitat, and climate needs ==
The giant barrel sponge is common on reefs throughout the Caribbean Sea, the Bahamas, Bermuda, the reefs and hard-bottom areas of Florida, and the Gulf of Mexico. In terms of benthic surface coverage, it is the second most abundant sponge on reefs in the Caribbean region. On the reefs off the Florida Keys, it may be as common at two individuals per square metre (yard), and the total biomass of the sponge is greater than any other benthic invertebrate. The sponge grows on any hard surface; the smallest individuals observed are about 1 cm. Two or more closely related species that are visually indistinguishable from X. muta are found on reefs in the Pacific and Indian Oceans (particularly Xestospongia testudinaria).

== Biology ==
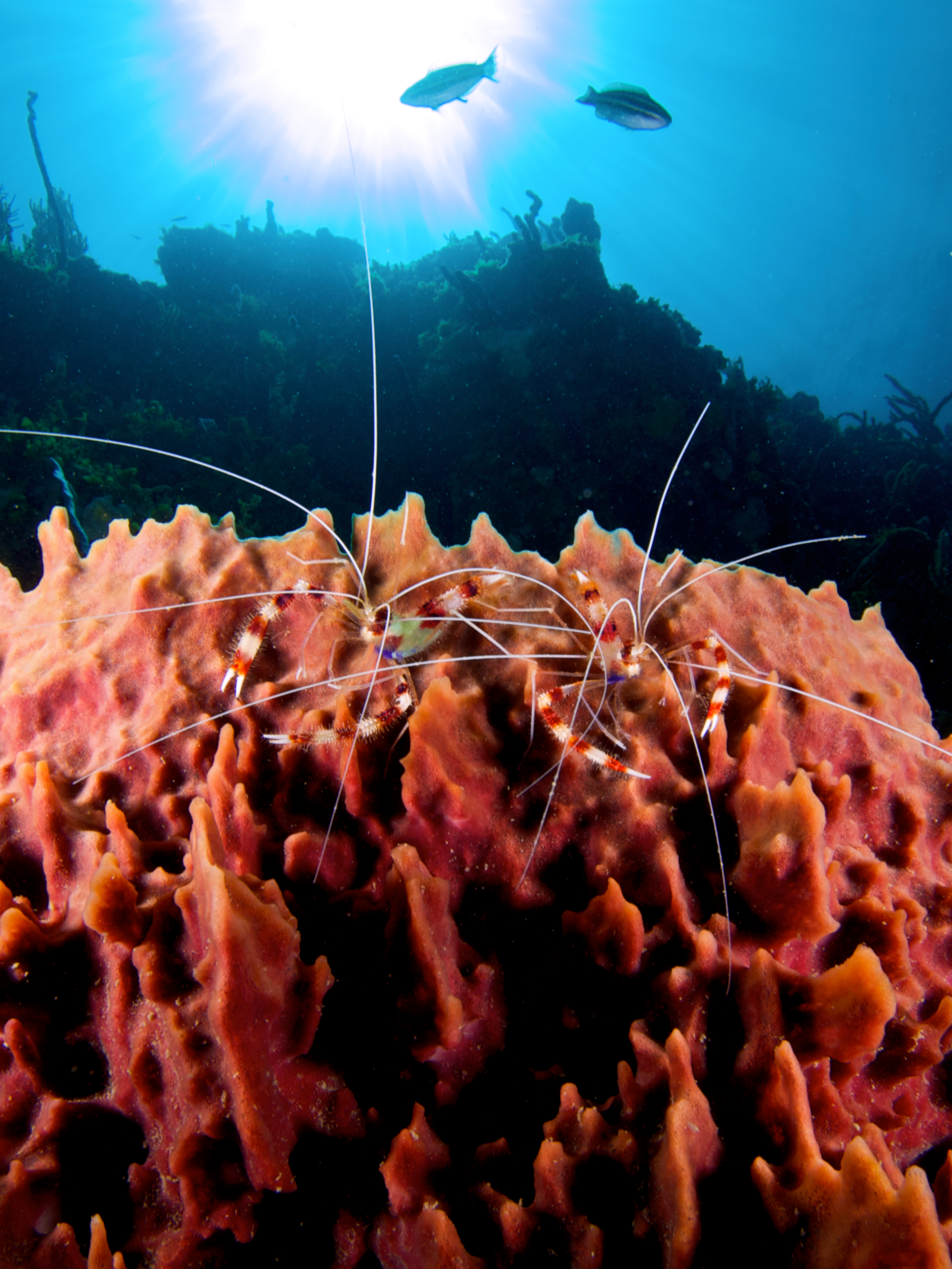
Two cleaner shrimp (Stenopus hispidus) using a giant barrel sponge as a cleaning station

The giant barrel sponge is a filter feeder. Water is continually pumped into the sides of the sponge, through the sponge body, and out of the osculum at the top of the sponge. Small pores in the sponge body are connected to channels lined by collar cells, each with a flagellum, and the beating of these flagellae draws water through the channels. Incoming particles, particularly microscopic bacteria and prochlorophytes, are phagocytosed by the collar cells. Sponges like X. muta also absorb dissolved organic compounds directly from the seawater as part of their diet.

The giant barrel sponge is probably dioecious, and spawns its eggs or sperm directly into the water column. Clouds of sperm from males are emitted from the osculum, while females produce flocculent masses of eggs that are slightly negatively buoyant. Spawning can occur at any time of the year, and occurs patchily on the reef, but usually with many individuals participating at the same time. Fertilization occurs in the water column. Resulting sponge larvae disperse with ocean currents, but there is some genetic differentiation among populations from Florida, the Bahamas and Belize.

Growth models for X. muta have been formulated from digital photographs of the same sponges over a period of 4.5 years. Sponge growth rates ranged from over 400% per year to only 2% per year. The largest sponges on Conch Reef, about the size of an oil barrel, were estimated to be about 130 years old. The largest individual for which a photograph was available (now dead) was estimated to be 2300 years old. By using the growth model, the age of an individual X. muta can be estimated from the osculum diameter and the base circumference.

== Ecology ==
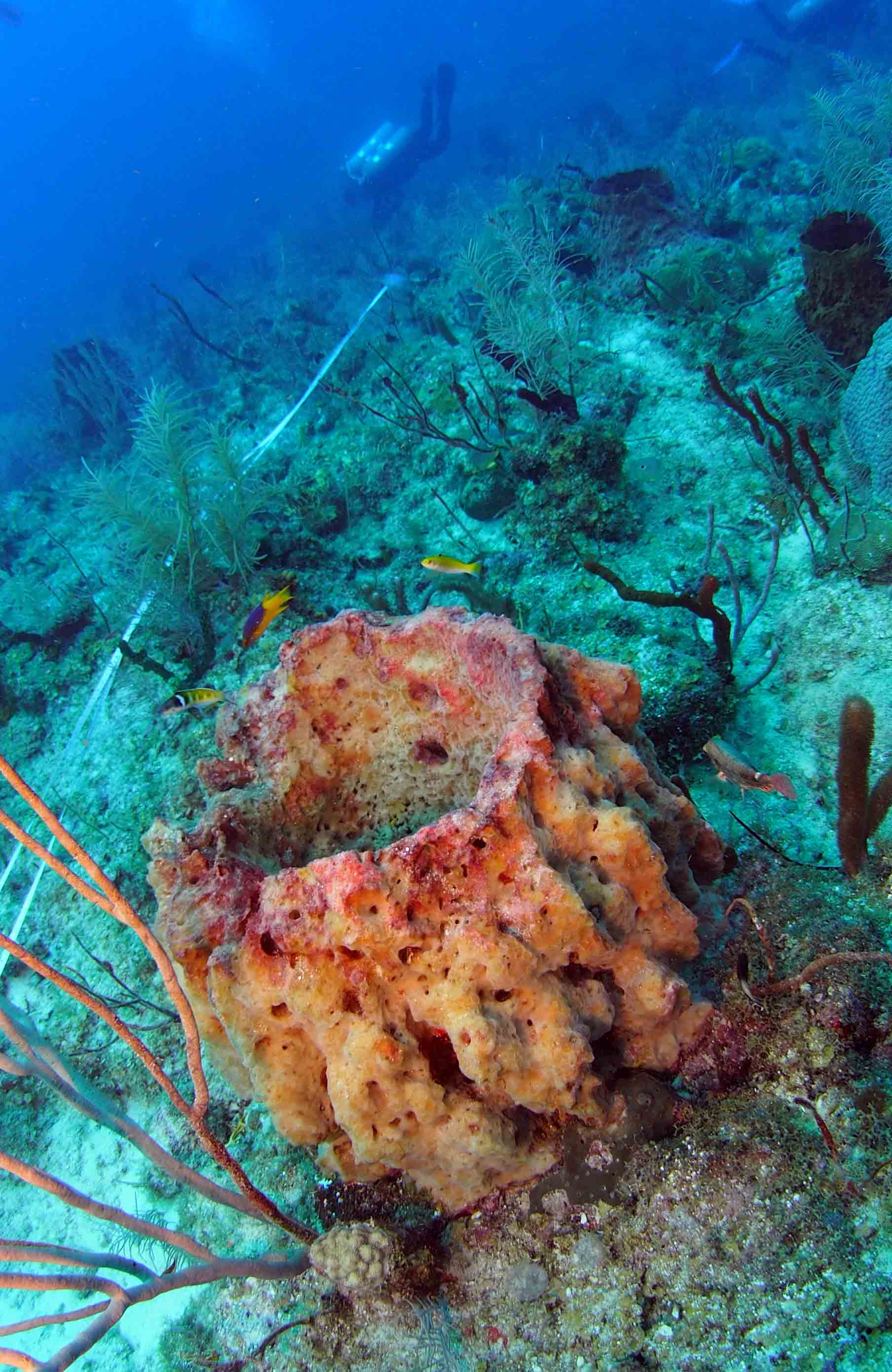
Xestospongia muta on Conch Reef, Florida Keys, dying of "sponge orange band." 2 June 2015, 15 m depth.

The tissues of the giant barrel sponge contain photosynthetic symbiotic cyanobacteria, Synechococcus spongiarum, which give the sponge its color. Individuals may undergo periodic bleaching, but this is a cyclic event, and the sponge recovers its normal coloration over time. This cyclical bleaching is likely to be a response by the cyanobacteria rather than by the host sponge, it has no negative effect on the host sponge. Unlike the circumstances for coral bleaching, X. muta does not appear to rely on its photosynthetic symbionts for nutrition, and they are considered commensals. Unrelated to cyclic bleaching is a pathogenic condition of X. muta called "sponge orange band" that can result in the death of the sponge. The cause and transmission of this pathogenic condition remains a mystery.

The giant barrel sponge is an important member of the reef community. Sponges filter large amounts of water, and are a predominant link in benthic-pelagic coupling on reefs and they harbor diverse assemblages of bacteria that can take part in nitrification and carbon fixation. It serves as a habitat for various invertebrates which live on the surface or in the interior and is grazed upon by some parrotfish. It is also host to a diverse community of microbes, some of which are primary producers or involved in nitrification.
