= Germ-soma differentiation =

Process by which organisms develop cells

Germ-soma differentiation is the process by which organisms develop distinct germline and somatic cells. The development of cell differentiation has been one of the critical aspects of the evolution of multicellularity and sexual reproduction in organisms. Multicellularity has evolved upwards of 25 times, and due to this there is great possibility that multiple factors have shaped the differentiation of cells. There are three general types of cells: germ cells, somatic cells, and stem cells. Germ cells lead to the production of gametes, while somatic cells perform all other functions within the body. Within the broad category of somatic cells, there is further specialization as cells become specified to certain tissues and functions. In addition, stem cell are undifferentiated cells which can develop into a specialized cell and are the earliest type of cell in a cell lineage. Due to the differentiation in function, somatic cells are found only in multicellular organisms, as in unicellular ones the purposes of somatic and germ cells are consolidated in one cell.

All organisms with germ-soma differentiation are eukaryotic, and represent an added level of specialization to multicellular organisms. Pure germ-soma differentiation has developed in a select number of eukaryotes (called Weismannists), included in this category are vertebrates and arthropods- however land plants, green algae, red algae, brown algae, and fungi have partial differentiation. While a significant portion of organisms with germ-soma differentiation are asexual, this distinction has been imperative in the development of sexual reproduction; the specialization of certain cells into germ cells is fundamental for meiosis and recombination.

== Weismann barrier ==
The strict division between somatic and germ cells is called the Weismann barrier, in which genetic information passed onto offspring is found only in germ cells. This occurs only in select organisms, however some without a Weismann barrier do present germ-soma differentiation. These organisms include land plants, many algaes, invertebrates, and fungi whose germ cells are derived from prior somatic cells as opposed to stem cells. The Weismann barrier is essential to the concept of an immortal germline, which passes down genetic information through designated germ cells.Organisms with germ-soma differentiation but no Weismann barrier often reproduce through somatic embryogenesis.

== Benefits and detriments of differentiation ==
There is no single widely accepted theory on the origins of somatic-germline differentiation, however of those that do exist many are based on the evolutionary advantage of differentiated multicellularity which has allowed it to survive. These theories include the development of colonial organization structures in which the division of labor between cells allowed for improvements in fitness.

The division of labor within multicellular organisms can offer significant advantages over unicellular counterparts. Division can allow organisms to become larger, or interact with the environments (and thus fill different niches) that increase fitness. In addition to internal benefits, there is evidence that these also improve defenses against predation. On the other hand, multicellularity comes with increased energy use devoted to maintaining homeostasis instead of to reproduction.

=== Dirty work hypothesis ===
One major theory as to the proliferation of organisms with cell differentiation is the dirty work hypothesis. This hypothesis posits that when an organism has differentiated cells, somatic cells are able to devote energy solely to maintaining homeostasis instead of reproduction while germ cells do the opposite. One reason proposed for the relative success of the "dirty work" system of organization is that it helps manage the detrimental effects of metabolic activity, and allow for more efficient energy distribution throughout an organism. The other major reason proposed is that it prevents metabolic activity within the cell from damaging genetic material. Said activity in mitochondria and chloroplasts creates mutagenic byproducts, so in organisms with differentiation where germ cells do not engage in metabolic activity the germline is not impacted.

== Uncertainty ==
Due to the nature of research around the origin of life and multicellularity, it has been difficult to obtain a case study that is optimal for observing somatic-germline differentiation. One case that has been extensively studied is that of organisms in the Volvocacaeae family. Within volvocavea, there is much diversity in organizational structure, with some organisms being unicellular, colonial, or (arguably) multicellular. Within volvocine algae three genes have been identified as crucial to the development of soma cells which regulate coding for asymmetric division of cells, preventing reproductive development of soma cells, and preventing the development of somatic characteristics in germ cells (such as those meant for mobility or metabolic activity).
