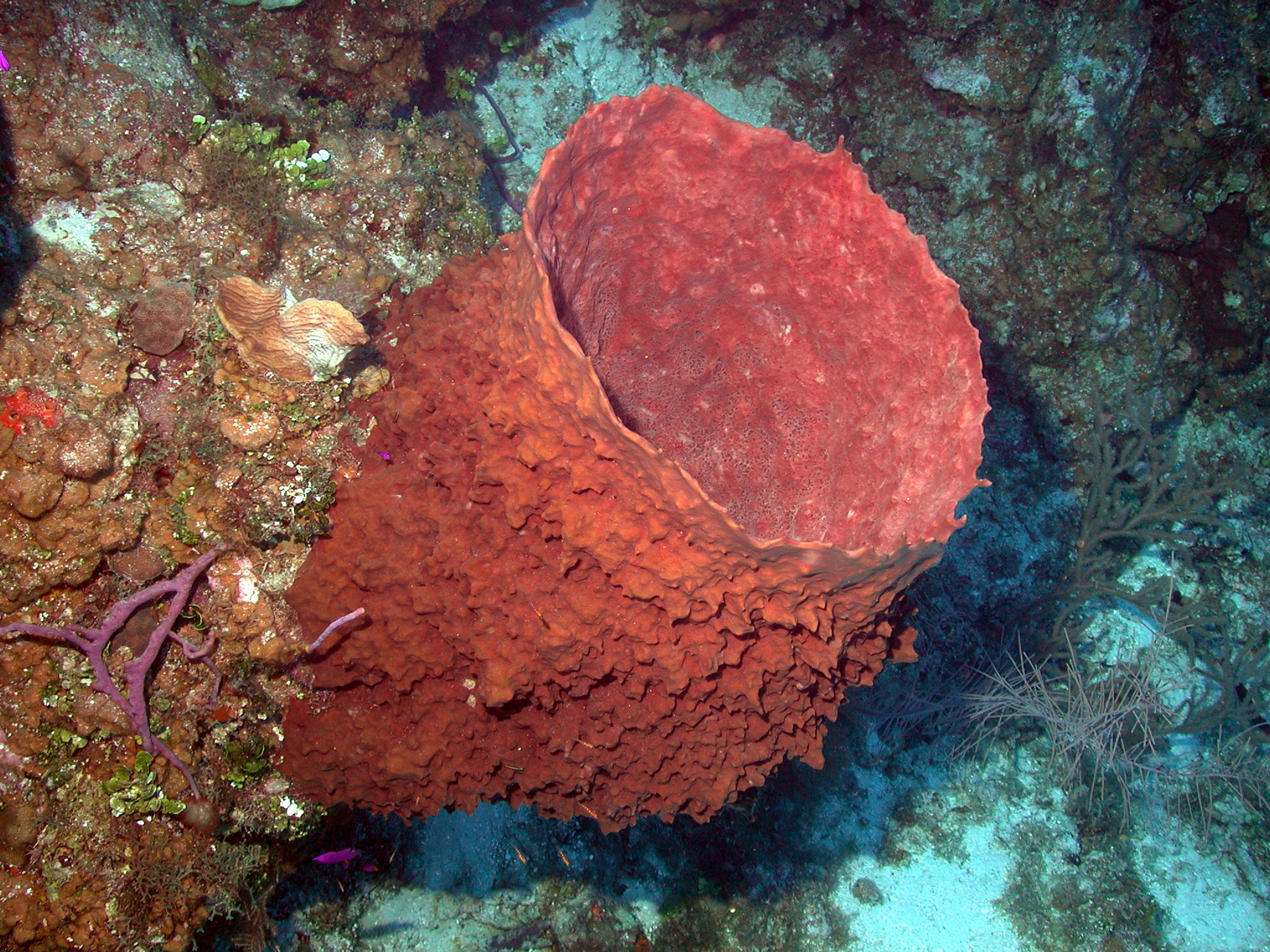
- Xestospongia muta

Scientific classification
- Domain: Eukaryota
- Kingdom: Animalia
- Phylum: Porifera
- Class: Demospongiae
- Order: Haplosclerida
- Family: Petrosiidae
- Genus: Xestospongia

Species
- See text

Synonyms
- Quepanetsal de Laubenfels, 1954

= Xestospongia =

Genus of sponges

Xestospongia is a genus of sponges in the family Petrosiidae. It contains the following species:

- Xestospongia arenosa van Soest & de Weerdt, 2001
- Xestospongia bergquistia Fromont, 1991
- Xestospongia bocatorensis Díaz, Thacker, Rützler & Piantoni, 2007
- Xestospongia caminata Pulitzer-Finali, 1986
- Xestospongia clavata Pulitzer-Finali, 1993
- Xestospongia coralloides (Dendy, 1924)
- Xestospongia delaubenfelsi Riveros, 1951
- Xestospongia deweerdtae Lehnert & van Soest, 1999
- Xestospongia diprosopia (de Laubenfels, 1930)
- Xestospongia dubia (Ristau, 1978)
- Xestospongia emphasis (de Laubenfels, 1954)
- Xestospongia friabilis (Topsent, 1892)
- Xestospongia grayi (Hechtel, 1983)
- Xestospongia hispida (Ridley & Dendy, 1886)
- Xestospongia informis Pulitzer-Finali, 1993
- Xestospongia kapne Carvalho, Lopes, Cosme & Hajdu, 2016
- Xestospongia madida (de Laubenfels, 1954)
- Xestospongia mammillata Pulitzer-Finali, 1982
- Xestospongia menzeli (Little, 1963)
- Xestospongia muta (Schmidt, 1870)
- Xestospongia novaezealandiae Bergquist & Warne, 1980
- Xestospongia papuensis Pulitzer-Finali, 1996
- Xestospongia plana (Topsent, 1892)
- Xestospongia portoricensis van Soest, 1980
- Xestospongia purpurea Rützler, Piantoni, van Soest & Díaz, 2014
- Xestospongia rampa (de Laubenfels, 1934)
- Xestospongia ridleyi (Keller, 1891)
- Xestospongia testudinaria (Lamarck, 1815)
- Xestospongia topsenti Van Soest & Hooper, 2020
- Xestospongia tuberosa Pulitzer-Finali, 1993
- Xestospongia vansoesti Bakus & Nishiyama, 2000
- Xestospongia variabilis (Ridley, 1884)
- Xestospongia viridenigra (Vacelet, Vasseur & Lévi, 1976)
- Xestospongia wiedenmayeri van Soest, 1980
