= David C. Queller =

American evolutionary biologist

David C. Queller is an evolutionary biologist at Washington University in St. Louis. He received his BA from The University of Illinois in 1976, and his PhD from the University of Michigan in 1982. Queller became a faculty member at Rice University in 1989 and remained there until 2011 when he was named Spencer T. Olin Professor of Biology at Washington University in St. Louis. Since the late 1980s, Queller has collaborated extensively with his wife and colleague Joan E. Strassmann. Empirically, Queller and Strassmann worked primarily with social insects until they made the switch to the social amoebae, Dictyostelium discoideum, in 1998.

== Honors ==
- Elected Member, National Academy of Sciences, 2024
- Fellow, American Association for the Advancement of Science, 2004
- Fellow, American Academy of Arts and Sciences, 2008
