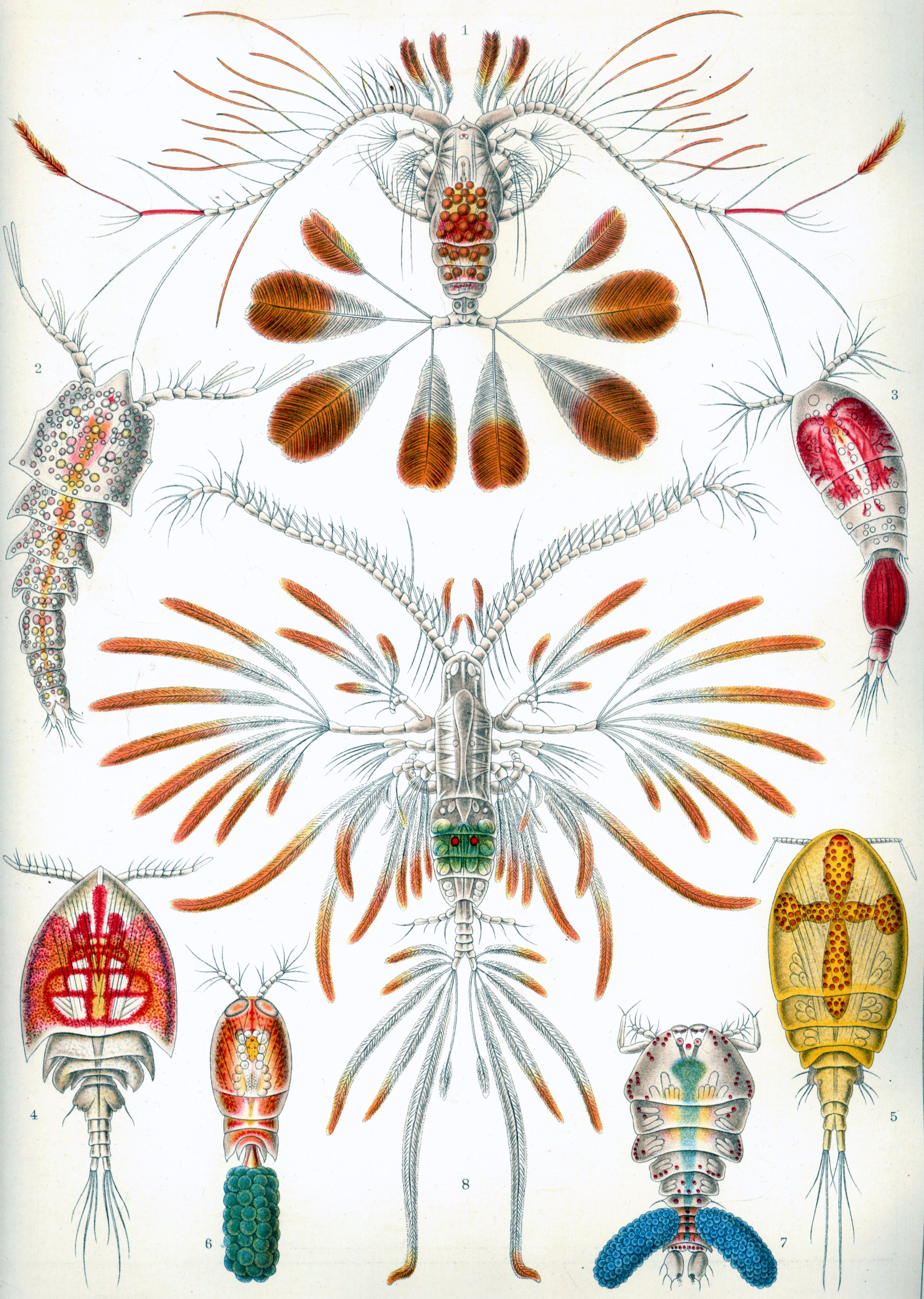
- Ernst Haeckel, 1904, Kunstformen der Natur (1904), plate 56: Copepod; 4. Cryptopontius thorelli Giesbrecht, 1899, female

Scientific classification
- Domain: Eukaryota
- Kingdom: Animalia
- Phylum: Arthropoda
- Class: Copepoda
- Order: Siphonostomatoida
- Family: Artotrogidae; Brady, 1880

Genera
- See text

Synonyms
- Dyspontiidae

= Artotrogidae =

Family of crustaceans

Artotrogidae is a family of copepods in the order Siphonostomatoida.

== Genera ==
- Abyssopontius Stock, 1985
- Antarctopontius Eiselt, 1965
- Arctopontius Sars G.O., 1915
- Artogordion Ivanenko et al., 2018
- Artotrogus Boeck, 1859
- Ascidipontius Kim I.H., 1996
- Bradypontius Giesbrecht, 1895
- Cribropontius Giesbrecht, 1899
- Cryptopontius Giesbrecht, 1899
- Dyspontius Thorell, 1859
- Glannapontius Holmes, 1998
- Glyptotrogus McKinnon, 1988
- Metapontius Hansen, 1923
- Myzopontius Giesbrecht, 1895
- Neobradypontius Eiselt, 1961
- Neopontius Scott T., 1898
- Pseudotrogus Eiselt, 1961
- Pteropontius Giesbrecht, 1895
- Pulicitrogus Kim I.H., 1998
- Sestropontius Giesbrecht, 1899
- Sewellopontius Ummerkutty, 1966
- Tardotrogus Eiselt, 1961
- Thoostoma Wilson C.B., 1924 (taxon inquirendum, treated as a genus inquirendum by Boxshall & Halsey (2004))
- Altopontius Stock, 1985 accepted as Abyssopontius Stock, 1985
- Conostoma Thomson, 1883 accepted as Thoostoma Wilson C.B., 1924
- Dystrogus Giesbrecht, 1899 accepted as Artotrogus Boeck, 1859
- Gallopontius Giesbrecht, 1895 accepted as Dyspontius Thorell, 1859
- Urogonia Brady, 1910 accepted as Bradypontius Giesbrecht, 1895
