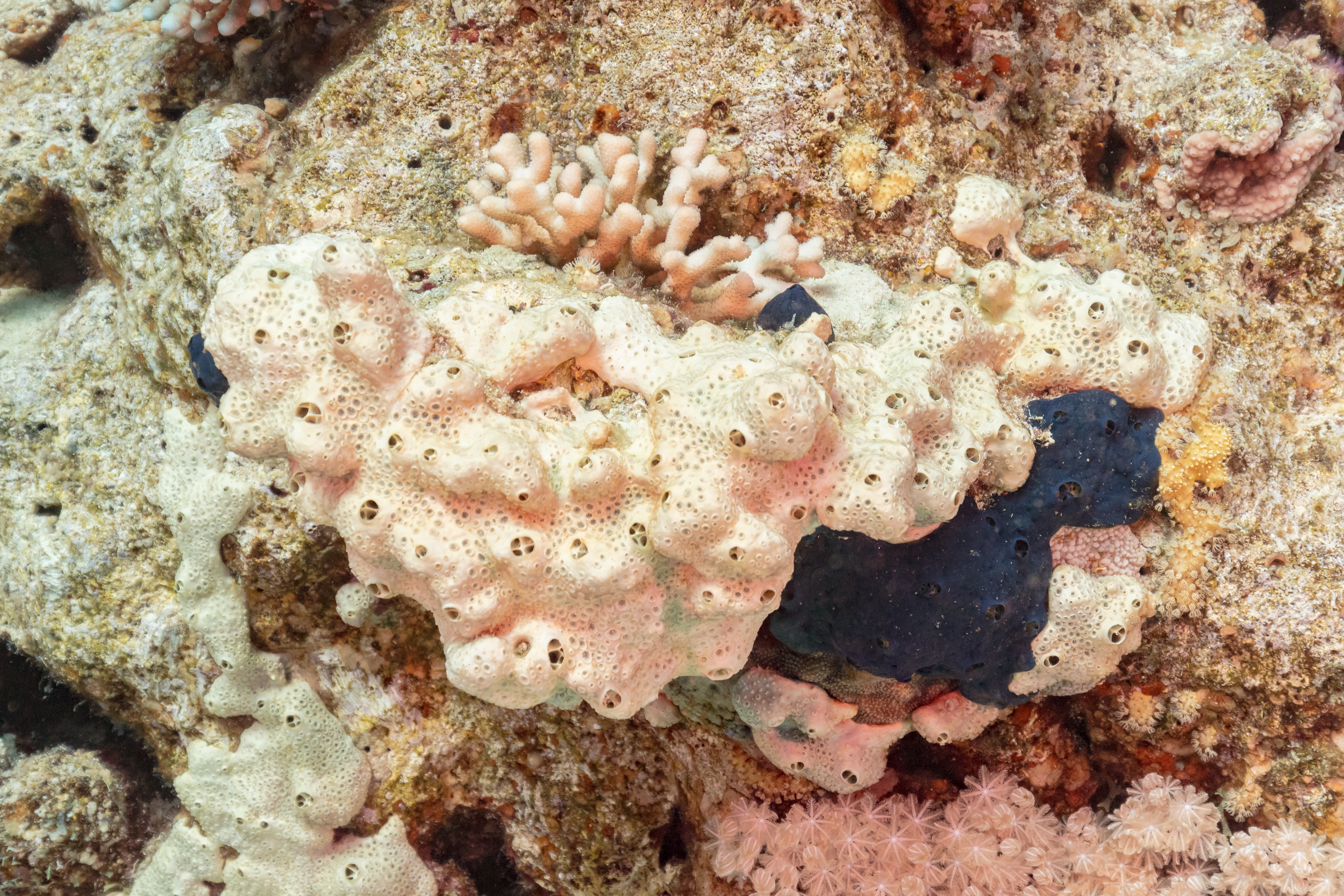
- Crella cyathophora with Hemimycale arabica in the Red Sea

Scientific classification
- Kingdom: Animalia
- Phylum: Porifera
- Class: Demospongiae
- Order: Poecilosclerida
- Family: Crellidae; Hentschel, 1923

Genera
- see text

= Crellidae =

Family of sponges

Crellidae is a family of marine demosponges in the order Poecilosclerida.

== Characteristics ==
Growth forms are varied and include branching, club-shaped, massive and encrusting. Identification of members of this family is based on microscopic examination of the spicules in their skeleton. The choanosomal skeleton is composed of tornotes while the ectosomal skeleton consists of a tangential crust of spined styles or oxeas. The microscleres are mostly arcuate isochelae.

== Genera ==
- Anisocrella Topsent, 1927
- Crella Gray, 1867
- Crellastrina Topsent, 1927
- Crellomima Rezvoi, 1925
- Spirorhabdia Topsent, 1918
