= Édouard Placide Duchassaing de Fontbressin =

- Born: 21 November 1818
- Died: 16 September 1873 (aged 54)
- Citizenship: France
- Scientific career
- Fields: Botany
- Thesis: Recherches sur les formes dans le règne animal et sur les caractères que l'on peut en tirer (1844)

Édouard Placide Duchassaing de Fontbressin (c. 1819 in Moule, Guadeloupe – 1873 in Périgueux) was a French naturalist. He is noted for his work in botany and spongiology.

A native of Guadeloupe, he studied zoology, geology and medicine in Paris. Afterwards, he returned to Guadeloupe as a physician, spending his free time conducting research of the island's flora. Subsequently, he visited several other islands of the Antilles, eventually relocating as a physician to Santa Marta, Panama (1848), from where he studied the natural history of the isthmus, sending his plant specimens to Wilhelm Gerhard Walpers, a botanist in Berlin (these specimens later became the property of August Grisebach).

Around 1850, he obtained a medical degree at Copenhagen, then settled in Saint Thomas of the Danish West Indies. He remained in Saint Thomas for 15 years, during which time he performed extensive research of sponges and coral, collecting and describing a large number of species with Giovanni Michelotti (1812-1898). From 1867 onward, he lived in the Périgord region of France.

The plant genus Duchassaingia (synonym Erythrina, family Fabaceae) was named in his honor by Wilhelm Gerhard Walpers.

== Selected publications ==
- Mémoire sur les coralliaires des Antilles, 1860 (with Giovanni Michelotti).
- Spongiaires de la Mer Caraibe, 1864 (with Giovanni Michelotti).
- Revue des zoophytes et des spongiaires des Antilles, 1870.
