= Joan E. Strassmann =

Evolutionary biologist

- Known for: Social evolution
- Scientific career
- Fields: Evolutionary Biology
- Workplaces: Washington University in St. Louis

Joan E. Strassmann is an American evolutionary biologist and the Charles Rebstock Professor of Biology at the Washington University in St. Louis. She is known for her work on social evolution and particularly how cooperation prospers in the face of evolutionary conflicts.

Her dissertation research explored theories of social behavior and evolution using individually marked social wasps in wild colonies. In 2011, Strassmann joined the Biology Department of Washington University in St. Louis. after leaving Rice University where she worked for the previous 31 years. Strassman earned a bachelor's degree in zoology from the University of Michigan and a Ph.D. in zoology from the University of Texas.

She is a member of the National Academy of Sciences (2013). She has received a John Simon Guggenheim Memorial Fellowship (2004), was elected a Fellow of the Animal Behavior Society (2002), the American Association for the Advancement of Science (2004), and the American Academy of Arts and Sciences (2008), and served as president of the Animal Behavior Society (2012).

Dr. Strassmann has a blog where she shares her beliefs on teaching, learning, and science. She believes that Wikipedia is a good resource for learning and teaching. Dr. Strassmann has also addressed the need for diversity among academicians.

== Honors ==
- Fellow, Animal Behavior Society, 2002
- Fellow, American Association for the Advancement of Science, 2004
- Fellow, American Academy of Arts and Sciences, 2008
- Member, National Academy of Sciences, 2013
