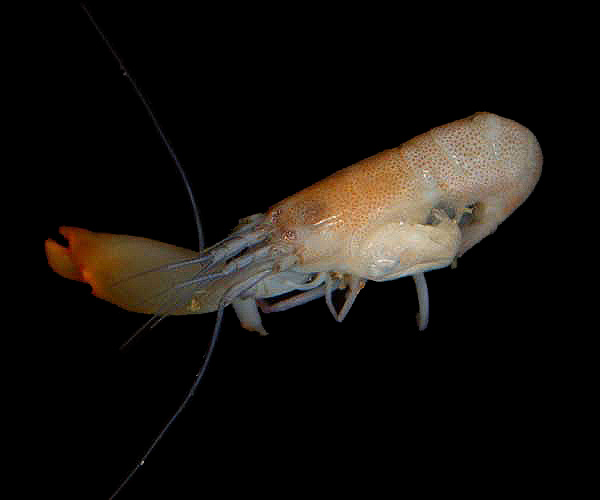
- Synalpheus fritzmuelleri

Scientific classification
- Kingdom: Animalia
- Phylum: Arthropoda
- Clade: Pancrustacea
- Class: Malacostraca
- Order: Decapoda
- Suborder: Pleocyemata
- Infraorder: Caridea
- Family: Alpheidae
- Genus: Synalpheus; Bate, 1888

Type species
- Synalpheus falcatus Bate, 1888

Species
- See species list

Synonyms
- List: Alpheinus Borradaile, 1900; Homaralphaeus Spence Bate, 1876; Homaralpheus Spence Bate, 1888; Zuzalpheus Ríos & Duffy, 2007

= Synalpheus =

Genus of crustaceans

Synalpheus is a genus of snapping shrimp of the family Alpheidae, presently containing more than 160 species; new ones are described on a regular basis, and the exact number even of described species is disputed.

== Taxonomy ==
Although the genus Zuzalpheus was proposed for S. gambarelloides, S. brooksi, and their closest relatives, this has not been adopted and is not considered a monophyletic clade within the genus Synalpheus.

Over 160 species are recognised in the genus Synalpheus. For a complete listing, see List of Synalpheus species.

== Distribution ==
In the narrower sense, Synalpheus occur in the eastern Pacific where they are most plentiful and probably originated, and to a lesser extent in the Atlantic and the Indian Ocean; the species placed in Zuzalpheus occur mainly in the western Atlantic where their lineage probably originated, and to a lesser extent in the eastern Atlantic and Indian Ocean, and the eastern Pacific. It may thus be that the closure of the Isthmus of Panama in the Piacenzian (about 3 million years ago) was a key factor in separating the two lineages, as species referred to Synalpheus sensu stricto are most plentiful in the western Pacific.

== Behaviour and ecology ==
=== Snapping ===
The snapping behaviour of Synalpheus is rather well studied. In Synalpheus parneomeris, peak to peak source levels of 185–190 dB re 1 μPa at 1 m were measured, depending on the size of the claw.

=== Eusociality ===
The only known eusocial aquatic species occur within the genus Synalpheus. The species known to be eusocial are S. brooksi, S. chacei, S. elizabethae, S. filidigitus, S. rathbunae, S. regalis, S. microneptunus, and S. duffyi as well as potentially S. riosi. The level of eusociality exhibited differs between species, with highly eusocial species having one reproducing female, or queen, per colony. Some species, including S. brooksi and S. rathbunae, may have up to a dozen reproducing females in a single colony. Species with many reproducing females see higher levels of reproductive competition.

Eusociality has evolved at least three times within Synalpheus. It appears that there were multiple rapid radiations between 3 and 9 mya from which the ancestors of these eusocial species appeared. Eusociality is thought to have arisen due to competition for space, because among the species that host Synalpheus, empty sponges are rarely found. The evolution of eusociality is also linked to a species filling a generalist role in their ecosystem, which is true of all Synalpheus species which exhibit eusocial behavior.It also appears that kin selection was necessary for this evolution to occur because the only species in which eusociality has appeared are non-dispersing shrimp that hatch directly into crawling individuals. Until recently, eusocial species of Synalpheus have appeared in far greater abundance than, and appear to outcompete, less social species for space in sponges.
