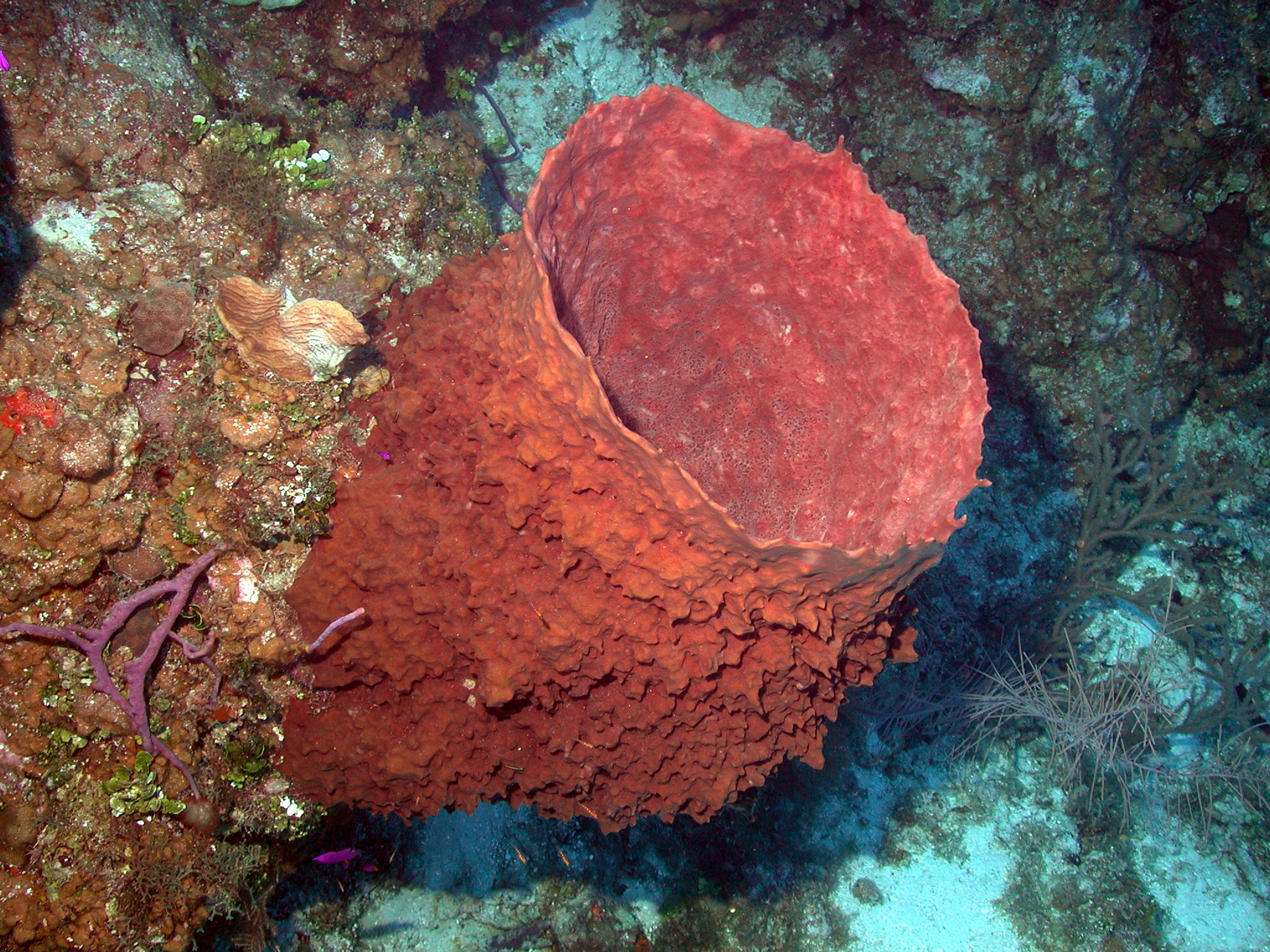
- Xestospongia muta

Scientific classification
- Kingdom: Animalia
- Phylum: Porifera
- Class: Demospongiae
- Order: Haplosclerida
- Family: Petrosiidae van Soest, 1980

Genera
- See text

= Petrosiidae =

Family of sponges

Petrosiidae is a family of sponges, first described in 1980 by Rob van Soest which contains the following four genera:

- Acanthostrongylophora Hooper, 1984
- Neopetrosia de Laubenfels, 1949
- Petrosia Vosmaer, 1885
- Xestospongia de Laubenfels, 1932
