= Kroyeriidae =

Scientific classification
- Domain: Eukaryota
- Kingdom: Animalia
- Phylum: Arthropoda
- Class: Copepoda
- Order: Siphonostomatoida
- Family: Kroyeriidae; Kabata, 1979

Type genus
- Kroyeria Beneden, 1853

Diversity
- 3 genera, see text

Family of copepods

Kroyeriidae is a family of copepods in the order Siphonostomatoida.

== Taxonomy and history ==
The family Kroyeriidae was established by Polish parasitologist Zbigniew Kabata in 1979 with Kroyeria as the type genus. Kabata erected the family to accommodate the existing genera of Kroeyerina and Kroyeria. Three genera are currently recognised.

== Classification ==
This family includes the following genera:

- Kroeyerina Wilson, 1932
- Kroyeria Beneden, 1853
- Prokroyeria Deets, 1987
