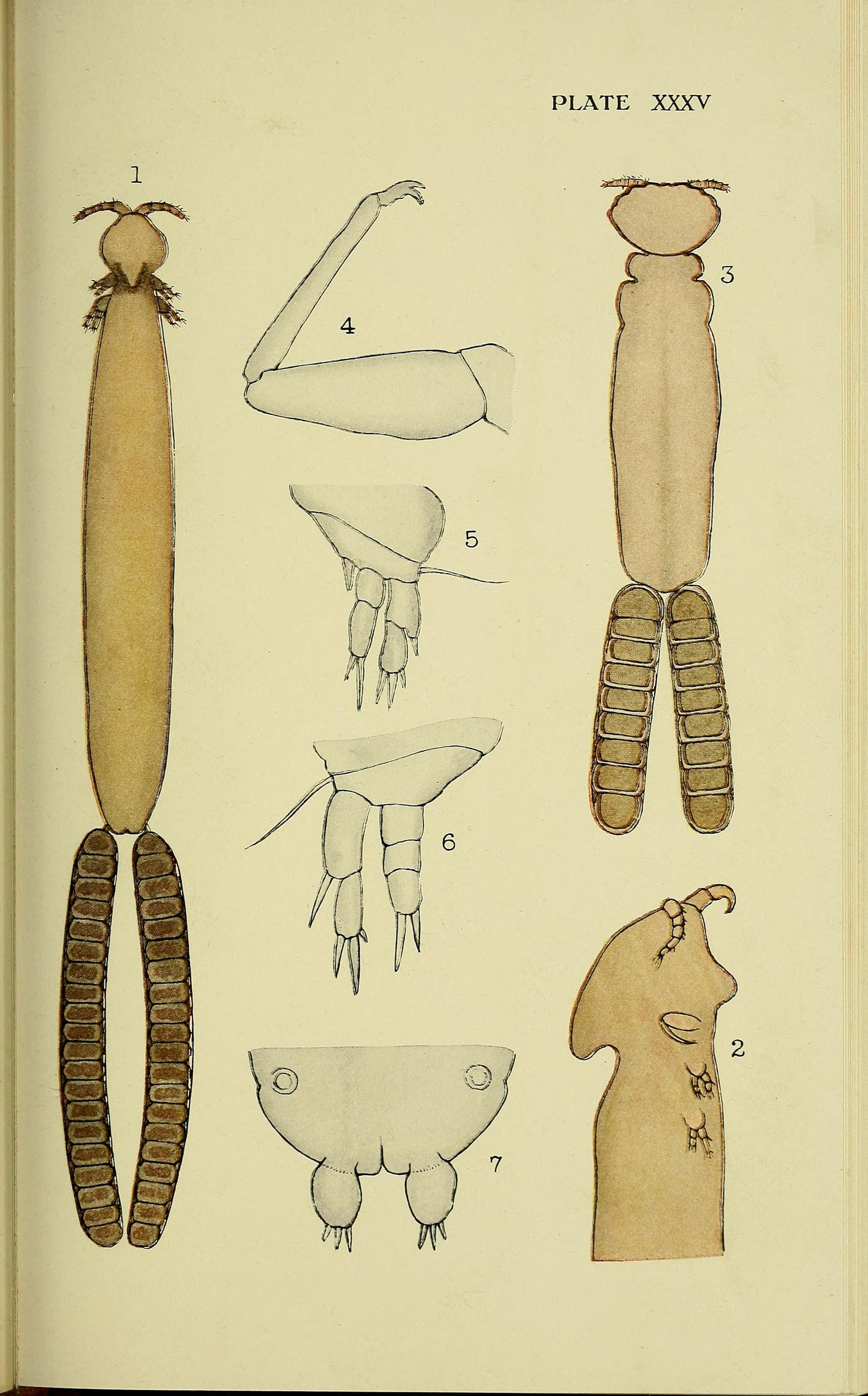

Scientific classification
- Domain: Eukaryota
- Kingdom: Animalia
- Phylum: Arthropoda
- Class: Copepoda
- Order: Siphonostomatoida
- Family: Hatschekiidae; Kabata, 1979

Type genus
- Hatschekia Poche, 1902

Diversity
- 9 genera, see text

= Hatschekiidae =

Family of copepods

Hatschekiidae is a family of copepods in the order Siphonostomatoida.

== Taxonomy and history ==
The family Hatschekiidae was established by Polish parasitologist Zbigniew Kabata in 1979 with Hatschekia as the type genus. Kabata erected the family to accommodate the existing genera of Bassettithia, Congericola, Hatschekia, Prohatschekia, and Pseudocongericola. Nine genera are currently recognised.

== Classification ==
This family includes the following genera:

- Bassettithia Wilson, 1922
- Brachihatschekia Castro-Romero & Baeza-Kuroki, 1989
- Congericola Beneden, 1854
- Hatschekia Poche, 1902
- Laminohatschekia Boxshall, 1989
- Mihbaicola Uyeno, 2013
- Prohatschekia Nunes-Ruivo, 1954
- Pseudocongericola Yü, 1933
- Wynnowenia Boxshall, 1987
