= Driocephalus =

Scientific classification
- Kingdom: Animalia
- Phylum: Arthropoda
- Class: Copepoda
- Order: Siphonostomatoida
- Family: Sphyriidae
- Genus: Driocephalus; Raibaut, 1999
- Species: D. cerebrinoxius

Binomial name
- Driocephalus cerebrinoxius (Diebakate, Raibaut & Kabata, 1997)

Synonyms
- Thamnocephalus cerebrinoxius Diebakate, Raibaut & Kabata, 1997

Monotypic genus of copepods

Driocephalus is a monotypic genus of marine copepods in the family Sphyriidae. Its sole species, Driocephalus cerebrinoxius, is a parasite that inhabits the nasal cavity of certain shark species. It is the only species of copepod known to parasitise the brain of its host.

== Taxonomy and history ==
Cheikhna Diebakate, André Raibaut, and Zbigniew Kabata described the genus Thamnocephalus and its sole species Thamnocephalus cerebrinoxius in 1997, publishing the description in the journal Systematic Parasitology. However, the name Thamnocephalus was preoccupied by the fairy shrimp genus Thamnocephalus, described by Alpheus Spring Packard in 1877. Raibaut would publish a replacement name in 1999, changing the generic name to Driocephalus and combining the binomial as Driocephalus cerebrinoxius. The generic epithet Driocephalus is derived from the Greek words drios, meaning "thicket" or "copse", and cephalos, meaning "head". The specific epithet is derived from the Latin words cerebrum, meaning "brain", and noxius, meaning "harmful".

Only adult females of the species have been documented. The holotype and three paratypes, all collected from the waters of the Atlantic Ocean off Senegal, were deposited in the collection of the Muséum national d'histoire naturelle. This species has also been collected from the Gulf of Gabès, the Red Sea, and the Pacific Ocean near Japan.

== Description ==
The body of adult female Driocephalus cerebrinoxius can be divided into three sections: a cephalothorax with a branching holdfast organ, a thin neck, and a flattened trunk. The tip of the cephalothorax bears a large, bushy holdfast consisting of numerous repeatedly branching dendrites. The neck is thin, noticeably demarcated from the cephalothorax, and cylindrical, becoming thinner towards the trunk. The trunk, bearing the genitals, is flattened and roughly rounded with two pairs of lobes at the posterior edges. The abdomen is reduced to a small swelling on the underside of the trunk, with two roughly cylindrical posterior processes on either side. The egg sacs are sausage-shaped. The male of this species is unknown.

== Ecology ==
Adult female Driocephalus cerebrinoxius are mesoparasites of the barbeled houndshark (Leptocharias smithii), the sandbar shark (Carcharhinus plumbeus), the bigeye houndshark (Iago omanensis), and the starspotted smooth-hound (Mustelus manazo), attaching to the olfactory bulb of the host's brain with its holdfast while the posterior section of the body trails free within the nasal cavity. Though other parasitic copepods are known to infest the nasal cavities of their hosts, D. cerebrinoxius is the only species of copepod known to penetrate through to the olfactory bulb and parasitise the nervous system. The impact of this parasite on its hosts is unknown.
