= Pseudocycnidae =

Scientific classification
- Domain: Eukaryota
- Kingdom: Animalia
- Phylum: Arthropoda
- Class: Copepoda
- Order: Siphonostomatoida
- Family: Pseudocycnidae; Wilson, 1922

Type genus
- Pseudocycnus Heller, 1865

Family of crustaceans

Pseudocycnidae is a family of marine copepods in the order Siphonostomatoida.

== Taxonomy and history ==
This grouping was first described by Charles Branch Wilson in 1922 as Pseudocycninae, a subfamily of Dichelesthiidae, though Wilson would later elevate the group to the rank of family in 1932.

== Ecology ==
Members of this family are common parasites of marine teleosts, particularly fish in the family Scombridae.

== Classification ==
This family includes the following genera:

- Cybicola Bassett-Smith, 1898
- Pseudocycnus Heller, 1865
