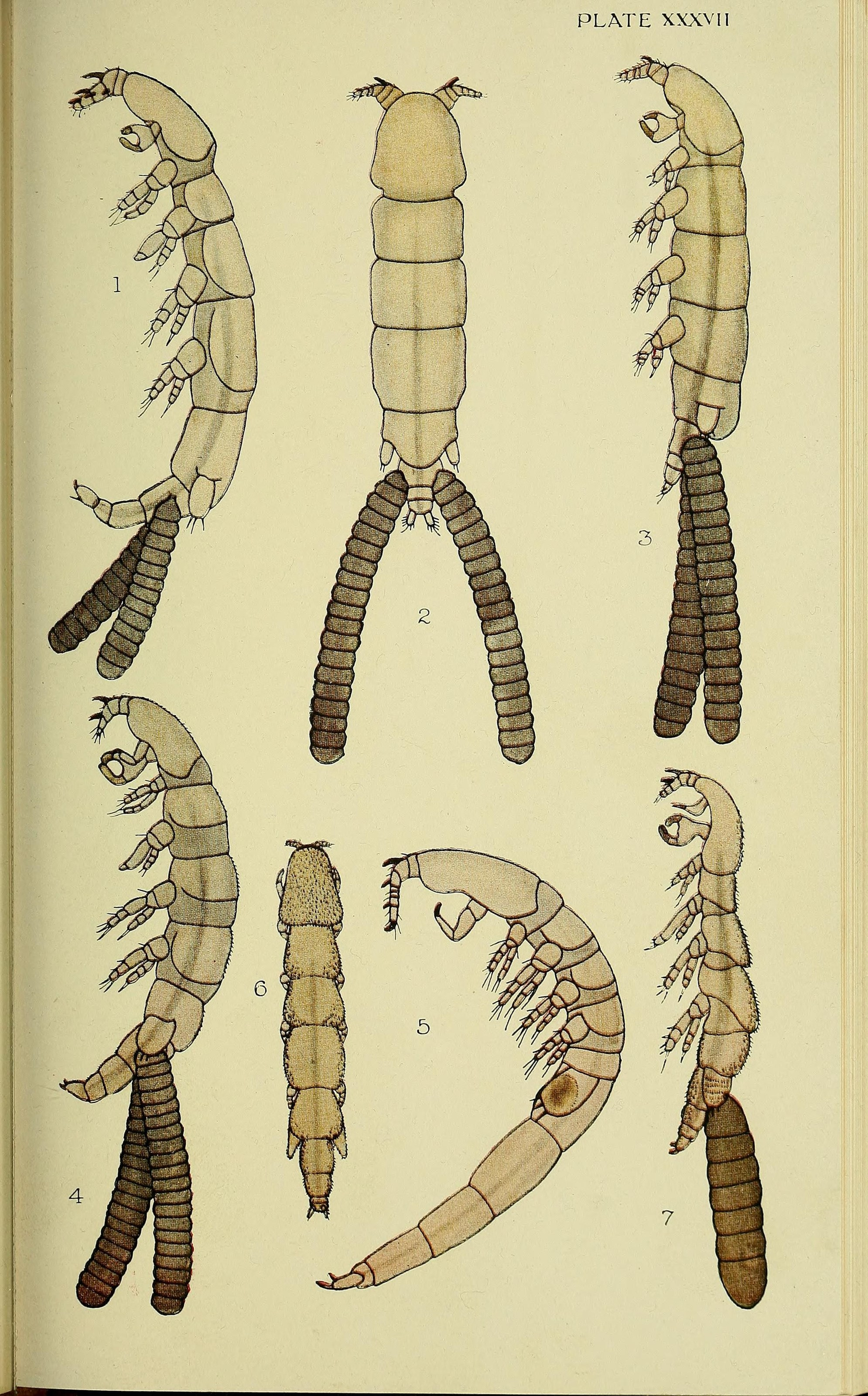
- 1: Eudactylina acuta; 2, 3: Eudactylina acanthii; 4, 5: Eudactylina similis; 6, 7: Eudactylina minuta

Scientific classification
- Domain: Eukaryota
- Kingdom: Animalia
- Phylum: Arthropoda
- Class: Copepoda
- Order: Siphonostomatoida
- Family: Eudactylinidae
- Genus: Eudactylina van Beneden, 1853

Type species
- Eudactylina acuta van Beneden, 1853

= Eudactylina =

Genus of crustaceans

Eudactylina is a genus of copepods. They parasitise elasmobranch fishes.

== Species ==
Eudactylina contains the following species:

- Eudactylina acanthii A. Scott, 1901
- Eudactylina acuta Van Beneden, 1853
- Eudactylina alata Pillai, 1968
- Eudactylina aspera Heller, 1865
- Eudactylina bicornis Hameed, Kumar & Mathew, 1990
- Eudactylina breviabdomina Pearse, 1952
- Eudactylina brevicauda Hameed, Kumar & Mathew, 1990
- Eudactylina chelata Hameed, Kumar & Mathew, 1990
- Eudactylina chilensis Ho & McKinney, 1981
- Eudactylina corrugata Bere, 1930
- Eudactylina dasyati Izawa, 2011
- Eudactylina dollfusi Brian, 1924
- Eudactylina gymnuri Izawa, 2011
- Eudactylina indivisa Castro-Romero & Baeza-Kuroki, 1991
- Eudactylina lancifera Pillai, 1968
- Eudactylina leptochariae Diebakate & Raibaut, 2000
- Eudactylina longispina Bere, 1936
- Eudactylina minuta T. Scott, 1904
- Eudactylina mobuli Hameed, Kumar & Mathew, 1990
- Eudactylina musteli Izawa, 2011
- Eudactylina myliobatidos Luque & Farfán, 1991
- Eudactylina nykterimyzon Deets, 1994
- Eudactylina oliveri Laubier, 1968
- Eudactylina papillosa Kabata, 1970
- Eudactylina parva Castro-Romero & Baeza-Kuroki, 1991
- Eudactylina peruensis Luque & Farfan, 1991
- Eudactylina pollex Cressey, 1967
- Eudactylina puriensis Tripathi, 1962
- Eudactylina pusilla Cressey, 1967
- Eudactylina rhinobati Raibaut & Essafi, 1979
- Eudactylina similis T. Scott, 1902
- Eudactylina spinula Pearse, 1950
- Eudactylina squamosa Bere, 1936
- Eudactylina squatini Izawa, 2011
- Eudactylina taeniuri Izawa, 2011
- Eudactylina tuberifera Castro-Romero & Baeza-Kuroki, 1987
- Eudactylina turgipes Bere, 1936
- Eudactylina uncinata C. B. Wilson, 1908
- Eudactylina valei Nuñes-Ruivo, 1956
- Eudactylina vilelai Nuñes-Ruivo, 1956
