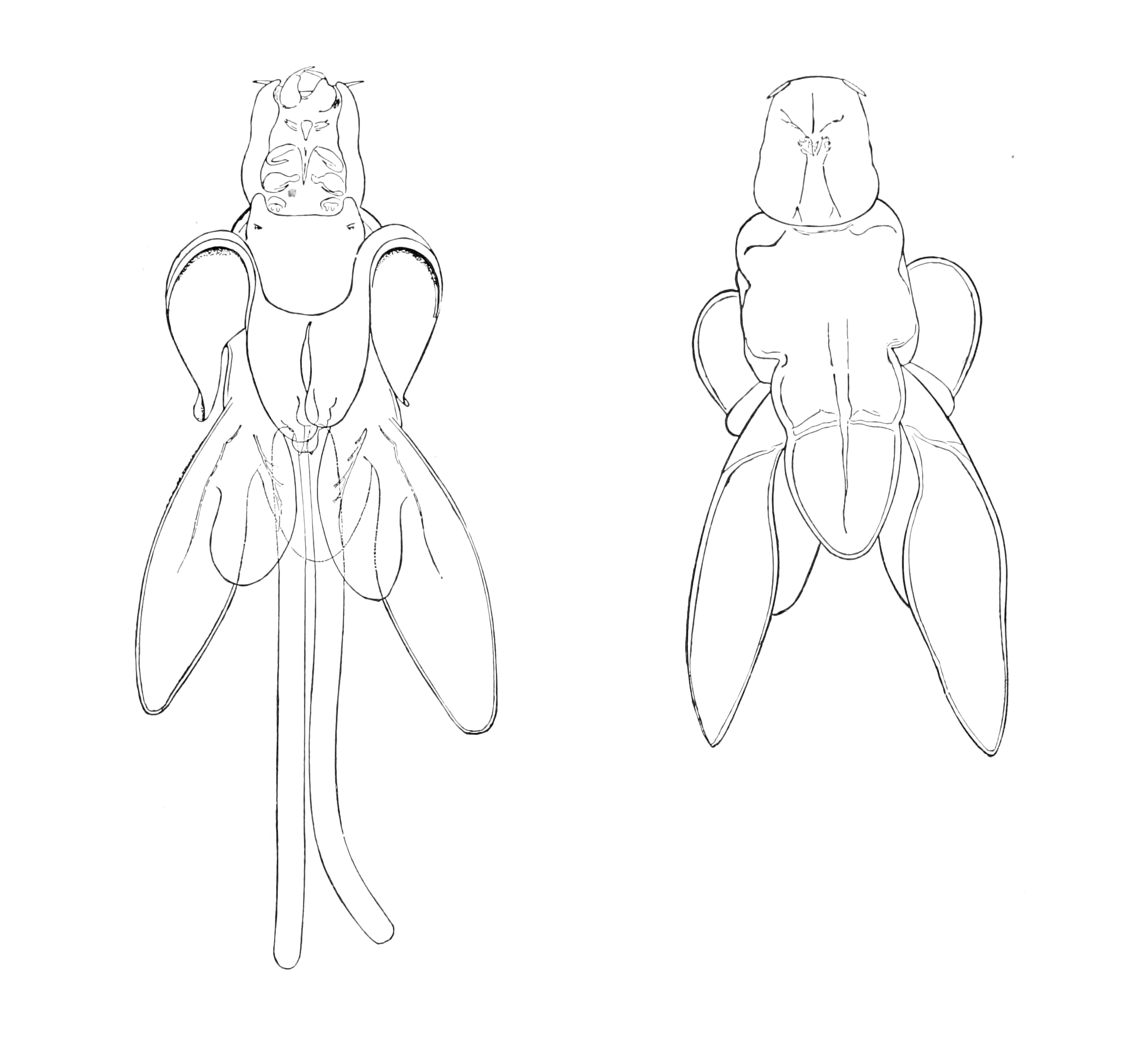
- Illustration of Lernanthropus brevoortiae

Scientific classification
- Domain: Eukaryota
- Kingdom: Animalia
- Phylum: Arthropoda
- Class: Copepoda
- Order: Siphonostomatoida
- Family: Lernanthropidae; Kabata, 1979

Type genus
- Lernanthropus Blainville, 1822

Diversity
- 8 genera, see text

= Lernanthropidae =

Family of copepods

Lernanthropidae is a family of copepods in the order Siphonostomatoida.

== Taxonomy and history ==
The family Lernanthropidae was established by Polish parasitologist Zbigniew Kabata in 1979 with Lernanthropus as the type genus. Kabata erected the family to accommodate the existing genera of Aethon, Lernanthropus, Lernanthropodes, Norion, and Sagum. Eight genera are currently recognised.

== Classification ==
This family includes the following genera:

- Aethon Krøyer, 1837
- Lernanthropinus Ho & Do, 1985
- Lernanthropodes Bere, 1936
- Lernanthropsis Ho & Do, 1985
- Lernanthropus Blainville, 1822
- Mitrapus Song & Chen, 1976
- Norion Nordmann, 1864
- Sagum Wilson, 1913
