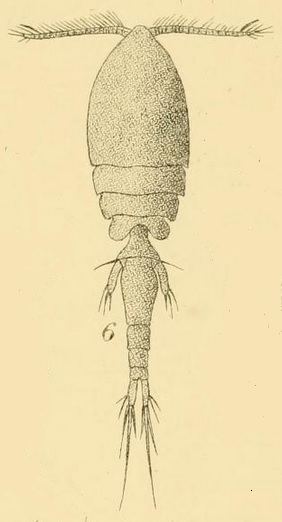

Scientific classification
- Domain: Eukaryota
- Kingdom: Animalia
- Phylum: Arthropoda
- Class: Copepoda
- Order: Siphonostomatoida
- Family: Asterocheridae
- Genus: Collocheres
- Species: C. elegans

Binomial name
- Collocheres elegans A. Scott, 1896

Synonyms
- Leptomyzon elegans (Scott A., 1896)

= Collocheres elegans =

Species of copepod

Collocheres elegans is a species of copepod in the family Asterocheridae. It is found in the British Isles and West Norway.

It is infesting Ophiocomina nigra, the black brittle star, in the Firth of Clyde, Scotland.
