= Eudactylina corrugata =

Scientific classification
- Kingdom: Animalia
- Phylum: Arthropoda
- Class: Copepoda
- Order: Siphonostomatoida
- Family: Eudactylinidae
- Genus: Eudactylina
- Species: E. corrugata

Binomial name
- Eudactylina corrugata Bere, 1930

Species of crustacean

Eudactylina corrugata is a species of parasitic copepod found on the little skate (Leucoraja erinacea) and the thorny skate (Amblyraja radiata) that is only known from St. Andrews, New Brunswick and Woods Hole, Massachusetts.

Eudactylina corrugata is only known from females. They are approximately 1.7 millimetres (0.067 in) long, and attach themselves to the secondary lamellae of the gills of their hosts using their chelate (clawed) maxillipeds. The species was described in 1930 by Ruby Bere.
