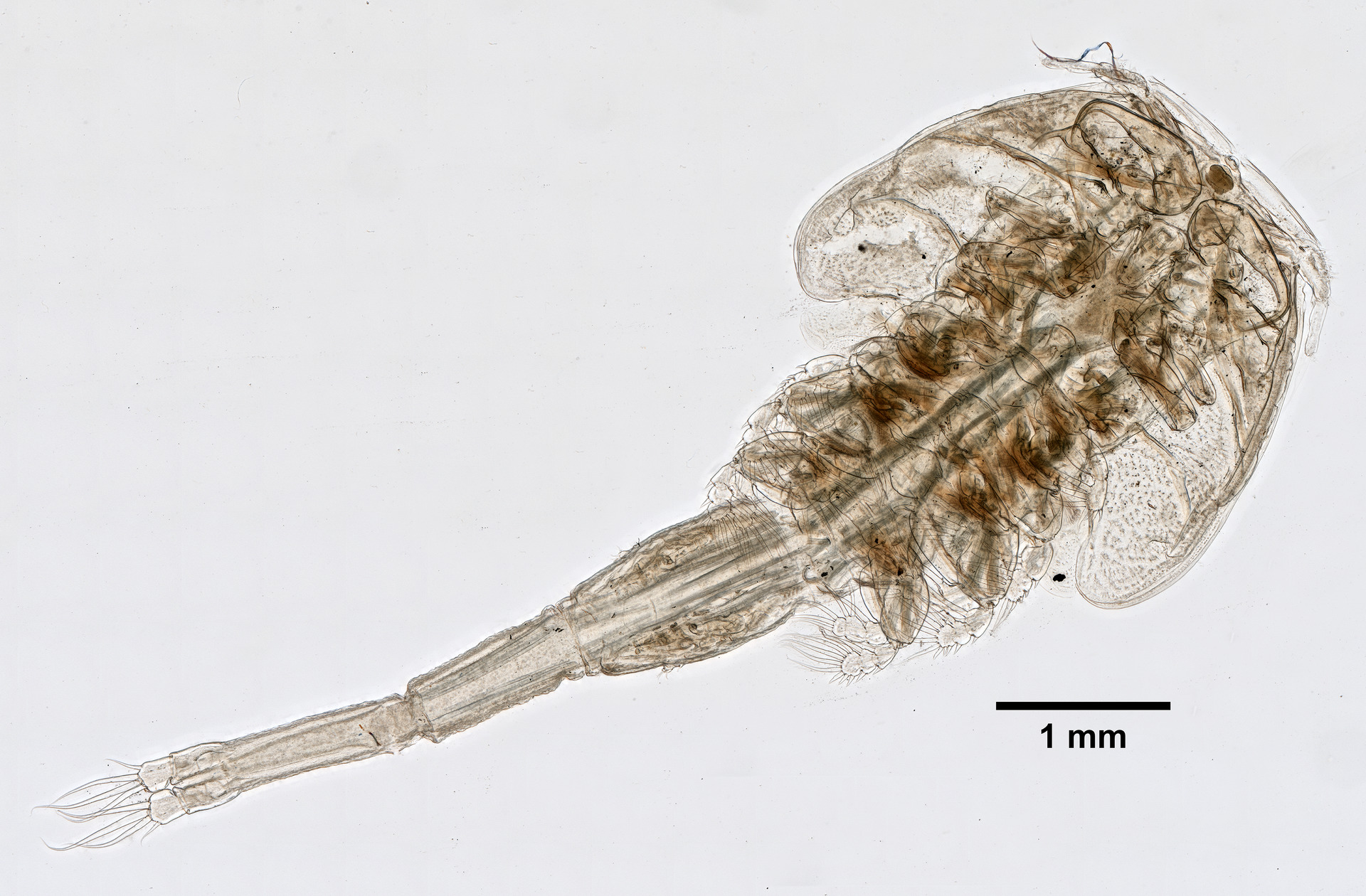

Scientific classification
- Domain: Eukaryota
- Kingdom: Animalia
- Phylum: Arthropoda
- Class: Copepoda
- Order: Siphonostomatoida
- Family: Trebiidae; Wilson, 1905
- Genus: Trebius; Krøyer, 1837

Type species
- Trebius caudatus Krøyer, 1838

Species
- 17 species, see text

Synonyms
- Caligina Beneden, 1861

= Trebius =

Genus of copepods

Trebius is a genus of marine copepods in the monotypic family Trebiidae.

== Species ==
This genus include the following species:

- Trebius akajeii Shiino, 1954
- Trebius benzi Dippenaar, 2017
- Trebius bilobatus Brian, 1912
- Trebius caudatus Krøyer, 1838
- Trebius elongatus Capart, 1953
- Trebius exilis Wilson, 1906
- Trebius heterodonti Deets & Dojiri, 1989
- Trebius javanicus Hameed & Pillai, 1973
- Trebius kirtii Hameed & Pillai, 1973
- Trebius latifurcatus Wilson, 1921
- Trebius longicaudatus Shiino, 1954
- Trebius minutus Capart, 1959
- Trebius nunesi Capart, 1959
- Trebius sepheni Hameed & Pillai, 1973
- Trebius shiinoi Nagasawa, Tanaka & Benz, 1998
- Trebius soleae (Beneden, 1861)
- Trebius tenuifurcatus Rathbun, 1887
