= Opimia =

Scientific classification
- Kingdom: Animalia
- Phylum: Arthropoda
- Class: Copepoda
- Order: Siphonostomatoida
- Family: Sphyriidae
- Genus: Opimia; Wilson, 1908
- Species: O. exilis

Binomial name
- Opimia exilis Wilson, 1908

Monotypic genus of copepods

Opimia is a monotypic genus of marine copepods in the family Sphyriidae. Its sole species, Opimia exilis, is a parasite of school sharks and dusky sharks.

== Taxonomy and history ==
The genus Opimia and its sole species Opimia exilis were described by Charles Branch Wilson in 1908. Wilson inititally placed Opimia in the family Lernaeidae, but would later find in a 1915 taxonomic revision that it and several other genera should be excluded from Lernaeidae on the basis of morphological characteristics. In 1919 Wilson would erect the family Sphyriidae to include Opimia and other parasitic copepod genera previously placed in Lernaeidae. The generic name Opimia is derived from the Vestal Virgin of the same name, who is said to have been buried alive for breaking her vow, while the specific epithet exilis means "slender". Wilson described the genus and species based on two female specimens collected from school sharks (Galeorhinus galeus) near La Jolla, California.

== Distribution and habitat ==
Opimia exilis has been collected from the waters off Southern California and from the Gulf of Mexico.

== Description ==
Adult female Opimia exilis are slender and elongated, lacking any external segmentation. The body can be divided into a rounded cephalothorax, a neck, and a narrow trunk bearing the genitals and a pair of posterior processes. The cephalothorax is swollen into a spherical shape and lacks any lobes or processes but has retained a single pair of rudimentary legs. The neck is cylindrical, comprising about two thirds of the total body length, and smooth except some wrinkles at the base where it joins the trunk. The trunk is longer than it is wide, with a pair of slender cylindrical processes protruding from the posterior end. The abdomen is small and rudimentary.

The male of this species is unknown.

== Ecology ==
Adult female Opimia exilis are parasites of school sharks (Galeorhinus galeus) and dusky sharks (Carcharhinus obscurus), attaching to the mouth and gills.
