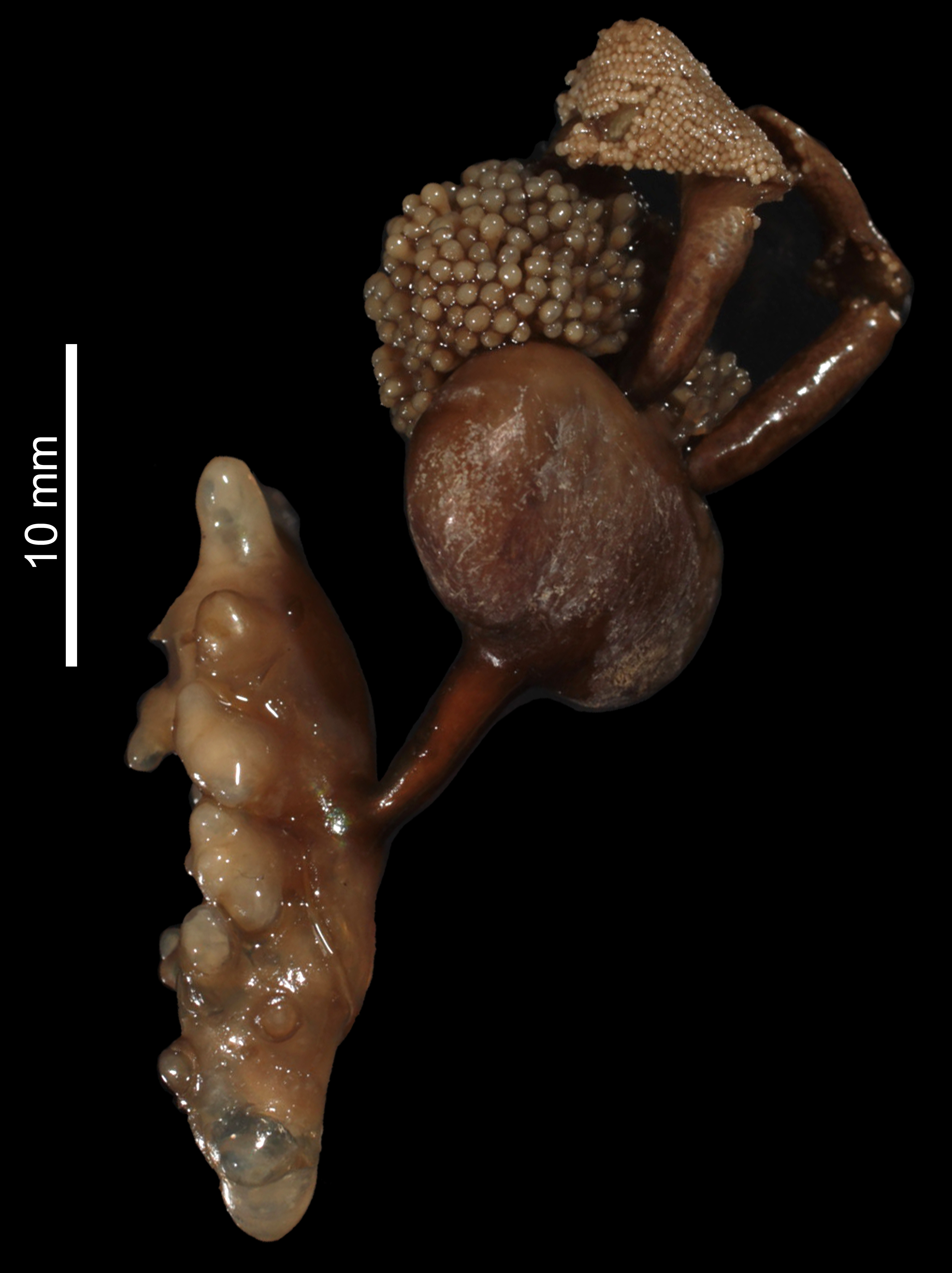
- Preserved specimen of Sphyrion laevigatum

Scientific classification
- Kingdom: Animalia
- Phylum: Arthropoda
- Clade: Pancrustacea
- Class: Copepoda
- Order: Siphonostomatoida
- Family: Sphyriidae; Wilson, 1919

Type genus
- Sphyrion Cuvier, 1830

Diversity
- 8 genera, see text

= Sphyriidae =

Family of copepods

Sphyriidae is a family of marine copepods in the order Siphonostomatoida.

== Taxonomy and history ==
The family Sphyriidae was established by Charles Branch Wilson in 1919 with Sphyrion as the type genus. Wilson erected the family to include the existing genera of Opimia, Rebelula (now recognised as Lophoura), Sphyrion, and Trypaphylum (now recognised as Tripaphylus) and the newly described genera of Paeon (now recognised as Tripaphylus) and Periplexus. Eight genera are currently recognised.

== Ecology ==
Adult female sphyriids are sessile mesoparasites of marine fishes, burrowing into the tissue of their hosts and anchoring themselves in place by expanding the cephalothorax or using a holdfast organ. Species of Driocephalus, Norkus, Opimia, and Tripaphylus are parasites of epipelagic elasmobranchs, attaching to branchial or olfactory lamellae, while species of Lophoura, Paeonocanthus, Periplexis, and Sphyrion are parasites of mesopelagic to bathypelagic teleosts, attaching to body musculature. Adult males are sometimes observed attached to adult females.

== Classification ==
This family includes the following genera:

- Driocephalus Raibaut, 1999
- Lophoura Kölliker, 1853
- Norkus Dojiri & Deets, 1988
- Opimia Wilson, 1908
- Paeonocanthus Kabata, 1965
- Periplexis Wilson, 1919
- Sphyrion Cuvier, 1830
- Tripaphylus Richiardi, 1878
