= Anthosoma =

Scientific classification
- Kingdom: Animalia
- Phylum: Arthropoda
- Class: Copepoda
- Order: Siphonostomatoida
- Family: Dichelesthiidae
- Genus: Anthosoma
- Species: A. crassum

Binomial name
- Anthosoma crassum (Abildgaard, 1794)

Synonyms
- Caligus crassus Abildgaard, 1794; Anthosoma smithi Leach, 1816; Caligus imbricatus Risso, 1816; Otrophesia imbricata (Risso, 1816); Caligus smithii Lamarck, 1818; Anthosoma imbricata (Risso, 1826)

Monotypic genus of copepod

Anthosoma is a monotypic genus of copepods in the family Dichelesthiidae, of which Anthosoma crassum is the sole representative.
