= Oithonidae =

Scientific classification
- Domain: Eukaryota
- Kingdom: Animalia
- Phylum: Arthropoda
- Class: Copepoda
- Order: Cyclopoida
- Suborder: Oithonida
- Family: Oithonidae

Family of crustaceans

Oithonidae is a family of copepods belonging to the order Cyclopoida.

Genera:

- Dioithona Kiefer, 1935
- Oithona Baird, 1843
- Pontoeciella
