= Norkus (copepod) =

Scientific classification
- Kingdom: Animalia
- Phylum: Arthropoda
- Class: Copepoda
- Order: Siphonostomatoida
- Family: Sphyriidae
- Genus: Norkus; Dojiri & Deets, 1988
- Species: N. cladocephalus

Binomial name
- Norkus cladocephalus Dojiri & Deets, 1988

Monotypic genus of copepods

Norkus is a monotypic genus of marine copepods in the family Sphyriidae. Its sole species, Norkus cladocephalus, is a parasite of the shovelnose guitarfish.

== Taxonomy and history ==
The genus Norkus and its sole species were described by Masahiro Dojiri and Gregory B. Deets in 1988, with the description published in the Journal of Crustacean Biology. The generic name Norkus is an anagram of Kronus, the Latinised form of Kronos, the youngest of the twelve Titans in Greek mythology, alluding to the plesiomorphic position of the genus within the family Sphyriidae. The specific epithet cladocephalus is derived from the Greek word clados, meaning "branch", and cephalus, the Latinised form of the Greek word kephale, meaning "head", in reference to the antler-like head of the adult female.

The specimens examined consisted of four adult females and two adult males found attached to the females, all collected from the Southern California Bight. The holotype, an adult female, was deposited in the National Museum of Natural History.

== Description ==
Adult female Norkus cladocephalus lack any legs or external segmentation. Measuring approximately 22 mm (0.87 in) in total length, the body can be divided into four parts: a cephalothorax that acts as a holdfast, a cylindrical neck, an expanded trunk, and a pair of posterior processes. The antler-like cephalothorax consists of a pair of lateral processes each further divided into four branches. On the underside of the cephalothorax are a pair of lobes surrounding the mouthparts. The neck is cylindrical with a wrinkled surface and a bulbous collar near the cephalothorax. The trunk is round and flattened with two depressions. The abdomen, bearing the anal slit, is reduced to a small protuberance on the trunk. The posterior processes, which may be modified caudal rami, are long and cylindrical, increasing in diameter towards the posterior end. The long, cylindrical egg sacs are held below the posterior processes.

Adult males are small, measuring only 1.5 mm (0.059 in) long, and resemble male lernaeopodids. The body is indistinctly segmented, with the cephalothorax comprising most of the body while the thorax and abdomen are greatly reduced. The caudal rami are conical with several setae.

== Ecology ==
Adult female Norkus cladocephalus are mesoparasites of the shovelnose guitarfish (Pseudobatos productus), attaching to the hemibranchs. Like all other members of the family Sphyriidae, females embed their cephalothorax within the flesh of their host, with the genitals, abdomen, and egg sacs remaining outside of the host. Adult males attach themselves to the females with their mouthparts, specifically the second maxillae and maxillipeds.
