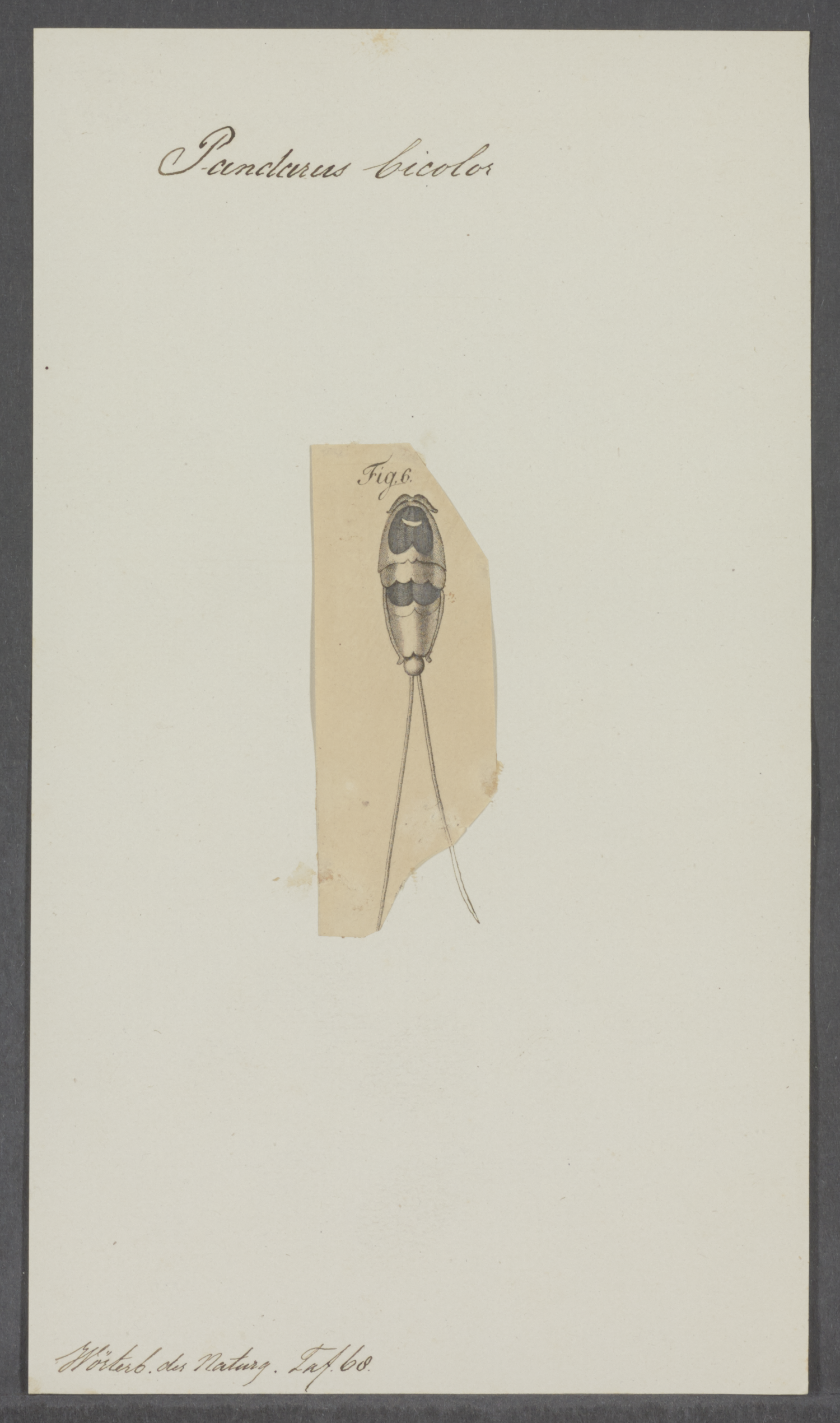
- Pandarus bicolor print

Scientific classification
- Kingdom: Animalia
- Phylum: Arthropoda
- Class: Copepoda
- Order: Siphonostomatoida
- Family: Pandaridae
- Genus: Pandarus; Leach, 1816

= Pandarus (crustacean) =

Genus of crustaceans

Pandarus is a genus of marine copepods. Species of Pandarus are parasitic to various species of sharks.

== Classification ==
There are fourteen recognized species, including:

- Pandarus bicolor Leach, 1816
- Pandarus carcharhini Ho, 1963
- Pandarus cranchii Leach, 1819
- Pandarus echinifer Dippenaar, 2024
- Pandarus floridanus Cressey, 1967
- Pandarus katoi Cressey, 1967
- Pandarus niger Kirtisinghe, 1950
- Pandarus satyrus Dana, 1849-1852
- Pandarus sinuatus Say, 1818
- Pandarus smithii Rathbun, 1886
- Pandarus zygaenae Brady, 1883
