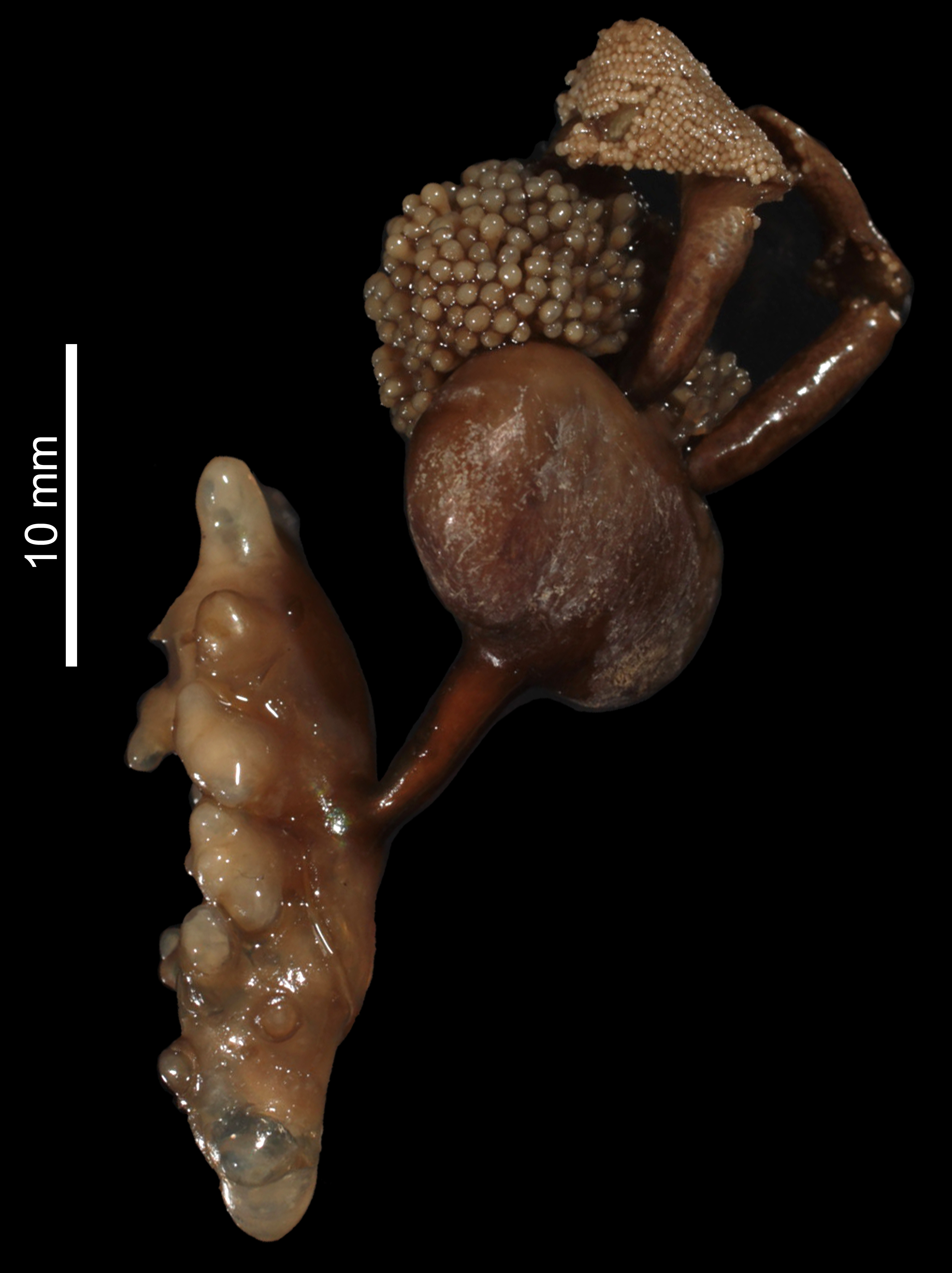
- Preserved specimen of Sphyrion laevigatum

Scientific classification
- Kingdom: Animalia
- Phylum: Arthropoda
- Clade: Pancrustacea
- Class: Copepoda
- Order: Siphonostomatoida
- Family: Sphyriidae
- Genus: Sphyrion; Cuvier, 1830

Type species
- Chondracanthus levis (Note: Also referred to as "Chondracanthe lisse" - see Taxonomy and history section) Quoy & Gaimard, 1824

Species
- S. laevigatum (Quoy & Gaimard, 1824); S. lumpi (Krøyer, 1845); S. quadricornis Gaevskaya & Kovaleva, 1984

Synonyms
- Lestes Krøyer, 1845; Lesteira Krøyer, 1863

= Sphyrion =

Genus of copepods

Sphyrion is a genus of marine copepods in the family Sphyriidae.

== Taxonomy and history ==
The genus Sphyrion was erected by French zoologist Georges Cuvier in volume three of the second edition of Le Règne Animal, published in 1830. The name Sphyrion appears to be derived from the Greek word σφυρίον, meaning "little hammer".

The type species, first described in 1824 by Jean René Constant Quoy and Joseph Paul Gaimard, was provided with both a common name ("Chondracanthe lisse") and a binomial name (Chondracanthus levis). When erecting the genus Sphyrion, Cuvier referred to this species – now recognised as Sphyrion laevigatum – using the common name "Chondracanthe lisse".

Three species are currently recognised.

== Species ==
This genus includes the following species:

- Sphyrion laevigatum (Quoy & Gaimard, 1824)
- Sphyrion lumpi (Krøyer, 1845)
- Sphyrion quadricornis Gaevskaya & Kovaleva, 1984
