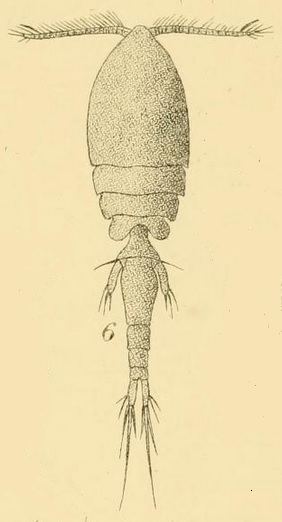
- Collocheres elegans

Scientific classification
- Domain: Eukaryota
- Kingdom: Animalia
- Phylum: Arthropoda
- Class: Copepoda
- Order: Siphonostomatoida
- Family: Asterocheridae
- Genus: Collocheres; Canu 1892

Species
- Collocheres breei Stock, 1966; Collocheres canui Giesbrecht, 1897; Collocheres elegans A. Scott, 1896; Collocheres gracilicauda (Brady, 1880); Collocheres gracilipes Stock, 1966

= Collocheres =

Genus of copepods

Collocheres is a genus of copepods in the family Asterocheridae.
