= Hyalopontius =

Scientific classification
- Domain: Eukaryota
- Kingdom: Animalia
- Phylum: Arthropoda
- Class: Copepoda
- Order: Siphonostomatoida
- Family: Megapontiidae
- Genus: Hyalopontius; Sars, 1909

Synonyms
- Megapontius Hulsemann, 1965

Genus of crustaceans

Hyalopontius is a genus of crustaceans belonging to the monotypic family Megapontiidae.

The species of this genus are found in Western Europe, Arctic regions.

Species:

- Hyalopontius alatus Boxshall, 1979
- Hyalopontius boxshalli Humes, 1988
- Hyalopontius cinctus Boxshall, 1979
- Hyalopontius enormis Boxshall, 1979
- Hyalopontius hulsemannae Boxshall, 1979
- Hyalopontius pleurospinosus (Heptner, 1968)
- Hyalopontius roei Boxshall, 1979
- Hyalopontius spinatus Boxshall, 1979
- Hyalopontius typicus Sars, 1909
