= Stellicomitidae =

Scientific classification
- Domain: Eukaryota
- Kingdom: Animalia
- Phylum: Arthropoda
- Class: Copepoda
- Order: Siphonostomatoida
- Family: Stellicomitidae

Family of crustaceans

Stellicomitidae is a family of crustaceans belonging to the order Siphonostomatoida.

Genera:

- Asterocomes Rao, 1962
- Astroxynus Humes, 1971
- Chorioxynus Humes, 1986
- Leicomes Humes, 1971
- Molucomes Kim, 2007
- Onychopygus Humes & Cressey, 1958
- Stellicomes Humes & Cressey, 1958
