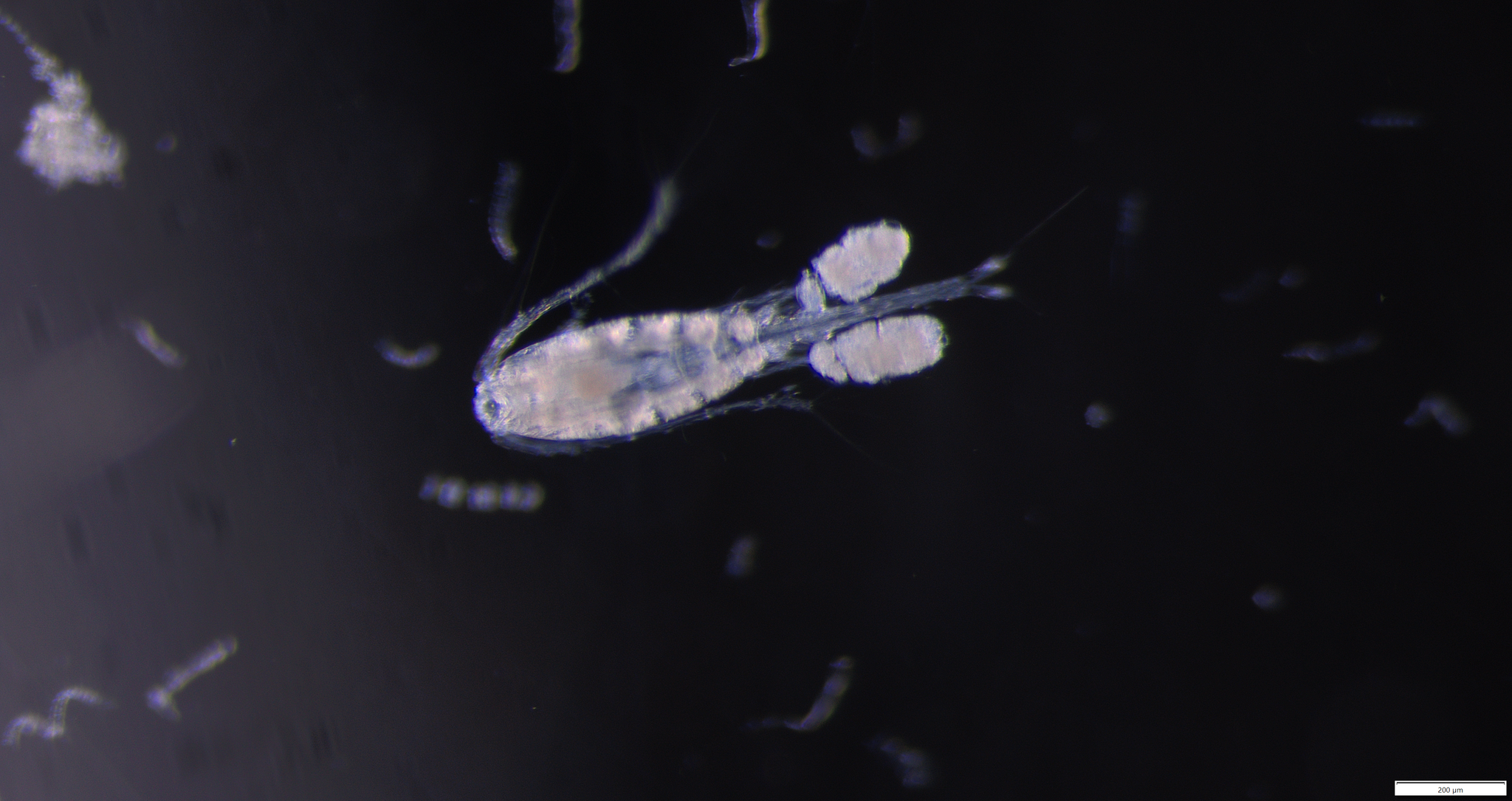
- Oithona similis

Scientific classification
- Kingdom: Animalia
- Phylum: Arthropoda
- Class: Copepoda
- Order: Cyclopoida
- Family: Oithonidae
- Genus: Oithona; Baird, 1843

= Oithona =

Genus of crustacean

Oithona is a planktonic crustacean genus found in marine, brackish, fresh water environments. Oithona has been described as the most ubiquitous and abundant copepod in the world's oceans. It was first described by Baird in 1843 using the species Oithona plumifera as taxon type.

The following species are recognized:

- Oithona aculeata Farran, 1913
- Oithona alvarezi Lindberg, 1955
- Oithona amazonica Burckhardt, 1913
- Oithona aruensis Früchtl, 1923
- Oithona atlantica Farran, 1908
- Oithona attenuata Farran, 1913
- Oithona australis Nishida, 1986
- Oithona bjornbergae Ferrari F.D. & Bowman, 1980
- Oithona bowmani Rocha C.E.F., 1986
- Oithona brevicornis Giesbrecht, 1891
- Oithona colcarva Bowman, 1975
- Oithona cruralis Nishida, Tanaka & Omori, 1977
- Oithona davisae Ferrari F.D. & Orsi, 1984
- Oithona decipiens Farran, 1913
- Oithona dissimilis Lindberg, 1940
- Oithona erythrops Brady, 1915
- Oithona fallax Farran, 1913
- Oithona farrani (Brady, 1915)
- Oithona flemingeri (Ferrari & Bowman, 1980)
- Oithona fonsecae Ferrari & Bowman, 1980
- Oithona fragilis Nishida, 1979
- Oithona frigida Giesbrecht, 1902
- Oithona gessneri Kiefer, 1954
- Oithona hamata Rosendorn, 1917
- Oithona hebes Giesbrecht, 1891
- Oithona horai Sewell, 1934
- Oithona linearis Giesbrecht, 1891
- Oithona longispina Nishida, Tanaka & Omori, 1977
- Oithona minuta Scott T., 1894
- Oithona minuta Krichagin, 1877
- Oithona nana Giesbrecht, 1893
- Oithona nishidai McKinnon, 2000
- Oithona oswaldocruzi Oliveira, 1945
- Oithona pacifica (Nishida, 1985)
- Oithona parvula (Farran, 1908)
- Oithona plumifera Baird, 1843
- Oithona pseudofrigida Rosendorn, 1917
- Oithona pseudovivida Shuvalov, 1980
- Oithona pulla (Farran, 1913)
- Oithona robertsoni McKinnon, 2000
- Oithona robusta Giesbrecht, 1891
- Oithona rostralis Nishida, Tanaka & Omori, 1977
- Oithona setigera (Dana, 1849)
- Oithona similis Claus, 1866
- Oithona simplex Farran, 1913
- Oithona splendens Baird, 1843
- Oithona tenuis Rosendorn, 1917
- Oithona vivida Farran, 1913
- Oithona wellershausi Ferrari F.D., 1982
- Oithona abbreviata (Dana, 1849) (taxon inquirendum, listed as "Unbestimmbare Species" by Giesbrecht, 1892)
- Oithona alia (Kiefer, 1935) accepted as Oithona rigida Giesbrecht, 1896 accepted as Dioithona rigida (Giesbrecht, 1896) (synonym according to Nishida, 1985)
- Oithona canhanhae Oliveira, 1945 accepted as Oithona hebes Giesbrecht, 1891 (placed in synonymy by da Rocha, 1986)
- Oithona challengeri Brady, 1883 accepted as Oithona setigera (Dana, 1849) (listed as synonym by Nishida, 1985)
- Oithona helgolandica (Claus, 1863) accepted as Oithona similis Claus, 1866
- Oithona neotropica Herbst, 1967 accepted as Oithona oswaldocruzi Oliveira, 1945 (placed in synonymy by da Rocha, 1986)
- Oithona oculata Farran, 1913 accepted as Dioithona oculata (Farran, 1913) (synonym )
- Oithona oligohalina Fonseca & Björnberg T.K.S., 1976 accepted as Oithona oswaldocruzi Oliveira, 1945 (placed in synonymy by da Rocha, 1986)
- Oithona oraemaris Oliveira, 1946 accepted as Oithona hebes Giesbrecht, 1891 (placed in synonymy by da Rocha, 1986)
- Oithona ovalis Herbst, 1955 accepted as Oithona hebes Giesbrecht, 1891 (placed in synonymy by da Rocha, 1986)
- Oithona ovata Lindberg, 1950 accepted as Oithona attenuata Farran, 1913 (synonymised by Nishida, 1985)
- Oithona pelagica Farran, 1908 accepted as Oithona setigera (Dana, 1849) (listed as synonym by Nishida, 1985)
- Oithona plumosa Lindberg, 1947 accepted as Oithona nana Giesbrecht, 1893 (synonymised by Nishida, 1985)
- Oithona pygmaea Boeck, 1865 accepted as Oithona similis Claus, 1866 (listed as probable synonym by Giesbrecht, 1892)
- Oithona rigida Giesbrecht, 1896 accepted as Dioithona rigida (Giesbrecht, 1896)
- Oithona sapucaiae Oliveira, 1945 accepted as Oithona hebes Giesbrecht, 1891 (placed in synonymy by da Rocha, 1986)
- Oithona scriba (Dana, 1849) accepted as Oithona plumifera Baird, 1843 (listed as synonym by Giesbrecht, 1892)
- Oithona sinensis Burckhardt, 1912 accepted as Limnoithona sinensis (Burckhardt, 1913)
- Oithona spinifrons Boeck, 1865 accepted as Oithona similis Claus, 1866
- Oithona spinirostris Claus, 1863 accepted as Oithona setigera (Dana, 1849) (listed as synonym by Nishida, 1985)
- Oithona spinulosa Lindberg, 1950 accepted as Oithona brevicornis Giesbrecht, 1891 (synonym according to Nishida & Ferrari, 1983)
- Oithona tropica Wolfenden, 1906 accepted as Oithona setigera (Dana, 1849) (listed as synonym by Nishida, 1985)
