= Coralliomyzontidae =

Scientific classification
- Domain: Eukaryota
- Kingdom: Animalia
- Phylum: Arthropoda
- Class: Copepoda
- Order: Siphonostomatoida
- Family: Coralliomyzontidae

Family of crustaceans

Coralliomyzontidae is a family of crustaceans belonging to the order Siphonostomatoida.

Genera:

- Cholomyzon Stock & Humes, 1969
- Coralliomyzon Humes & Stock, 1991
- Temanus Humes, 1997
- Tondua Humes, 1997
