= Brychiopontiidae =

Scientific classification
- Domain: Eukaryota
- Kingdom: Animalia
- Phylum: Arthropoda
- Class: Copepoda
- Order: Siphonostomatoida
- Family: Brychiopontiidae

Family of crustaceans

Brychiopontiidae is a family of crustaceans belonging to the order Siphonostomatoida.

Genera:

- Brychiopontius Humes, 1974
- Neobrychiopontius Mahatma, Martínez Arbizu & Ivanenko, 2008
- Pseudobrychiopontius Avdeev, 2017
