= Spongiocnizontidae =

Scientific classification
- Domain: Eukaryota
- Kingdom: Animalia
- Phylum: Arthropoda
- Class: Copepoda
- Order: Siphonostomatoida
- Family: Spongiocnizontidae

Family of crustaceans

Spongiocnizontidae is a family of crustaceans belonging to the order Siphonostomatoida.

Genera:

- Apodomyzon Stock, 1970
- Spongiocnizon Stock & Kleeton, 1964
