= Hyponeoidae =

Scientific classification
- Domain: Eukaryota
- Kingdom: Animalia
- Phylum: Arthropoda
- Class: Copepoda
- Order: Siphonostomatoida
- Family: Hyponeoidae

Family of crustaceans

Hyponeoidae is a family of crustaceans belonging to the order Siphonostomatoida.

Genera:

- Greeniedeets Benz, 2006
- Hyponeo Heegaard, 1962
- Tautochondria Ho, 1987
