= Sponginticola =

Scientific classification
- Domain: Eukaryota
- Kingdom: Animalia
- Phylum: Arthropoda
- Class: Copepoda
- Order: Siphonostomatoida
- Family: Sponginticolidae
- Genus: Sponginticola; Topsent, 1928
- Species: S. uncifera

Binomial name
- Sponginticola uncifera Topsent, 1928

Genus of crustaceans

Sponginticola is a monotypic genus of crustaceans belonging to the monotypic family Sponginticolidae. The only species is Sponginticola uncifera.
