= Dichelina =

Scientific classification
- Domain: Eukaryota
- Kingdom: Animalia
- Phylum: Arthropoda
- Class: Copepoda
- Order: Siphonostomatoida
- Family: Dichelinidae
- Genus: Dichelina; Stephensen, 1933

Genus of crustaceans

Dichelina is a genus of crustaceans belonging to the monotypic family Dichelinidae.

The species of this genus are found in Western Europe, Malesia.

Species:

- Dichelina phormosomae Stephensen, 1933
- Dichelina seticauda Stock, 1968
