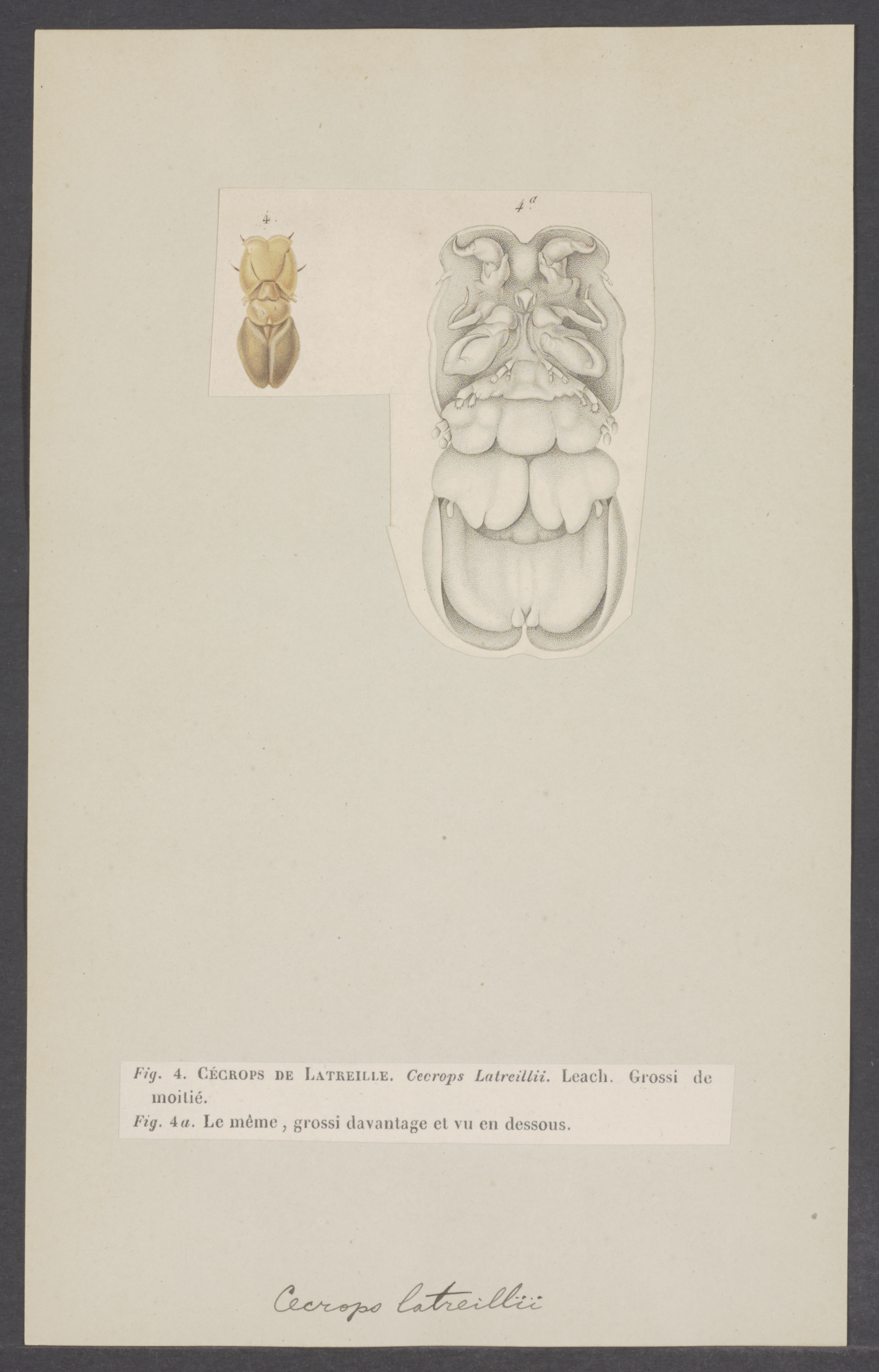

Scientific classification
- Kingdom: Animalia
- Phylum: Arthropoda
- Clade: Pancrustacea
- Class: Copepoda
- Order: Siphonostomatoida
- Family: Pandaridae; Milne Edwards, 1840

Synonyms
- Amaterasidae; Cecropidae

= Pandaridae =

Family of arthropods

Pandaridae is a family of copepods belonging to the order Siphonostomatoida.

== Behavior ==
Pandaridae is considered a parasite that attaches itself to its host. Typically, they attach themselves to their host bodies (elasmobranchs) aiming for their fins and lips.

== Genera ==
Genera:

- Achtheinus Wilson, 1908
- Amaterasia Izawa, 2008
- Cecrops Leach, 1816
- Pandarus Leach, 1816
