= Archidactylina =

Archidactylina myxinicola

Scientific classification
- Domain: Eukaryota
- Kingdom: Animalia
- Phylum: Arthropoda
- Class: Copepoda
- Order: Siphonostomatoida
- Family: Archidactylinidae; Izawa, 1996
- Genus: Archidactylina; Izawa, 1996
- Species: A. myxinicola

Binomial name
- Archidactylina myxinicola Izawa, 1996

Genus of crustaceans

Archidactylina is a genus of copepods that contains only the species Archidactylina myxinicola, and is the only genus in the family Archidactylinidae. It is a parasite of the gill pouches of two species of hagfish found in Japanese waters, Eptatretus okinoseanus and Myxine garmani.
