= Dissonidae =

Scientific classification
- Domain: Eukaryota
- Kingdom: Animalia
- Phylum: Arthropoda
- Class: Copepoda
- Order: Siphonostomatoida
- Family: Dissonidae

Family of crustaceans

Dissonidae is a family of crustaceans belonging to the order Siphonostomatoida.

Genera:

- Dissonus Wilson, 1906
- Innaprokofevnas Kazatchenko, 2001
