= Rataniidae =

Scientific classification
- Kingdom: Animalia
- Phylum: Arthropoda
- Clade: Pancrustacea
- Class: Copepoda
- Order: Siphonostomatoida
- Family: Rataniidae

Family of crustaceans

Rataniidae is a family of copepods belonging to the order Siphonostomatoida.

Genera:

- Ratania Giesbrecht, 1893
