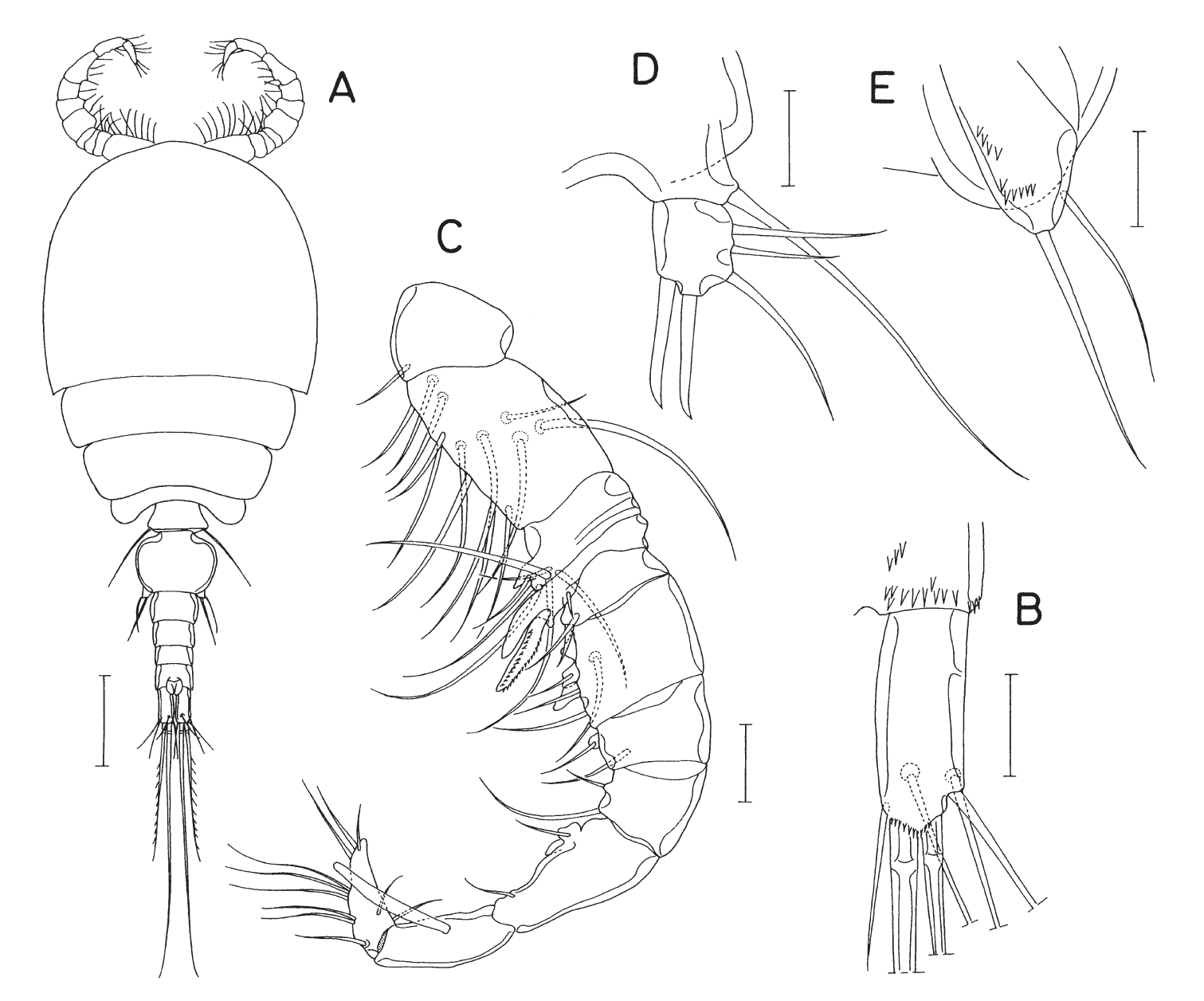
- A picture Aphotopontius kiosta member of Dirivultidae

Scientific classification
- Kingdom: Animalia
- Phylum: Arthropoda
- Clade: Pancrustacea
- Class: Copepoda
- Order: Siphonostomatoida
- Family: Dirivultidae

= Dirivultidae =

Family of crustaceans

Dirivultidae is a family of crustaceans belonging to the order Siphonostomatoida.

== Genera ==
Genera:

- Aphotopontius Humes, 1987
- Benthoxynus Humes, 1984
- Ceuthoecetes Humes & Dojiri, 1980
- ‘’Dirivultus’’ Humes & Dojiri, 1981
