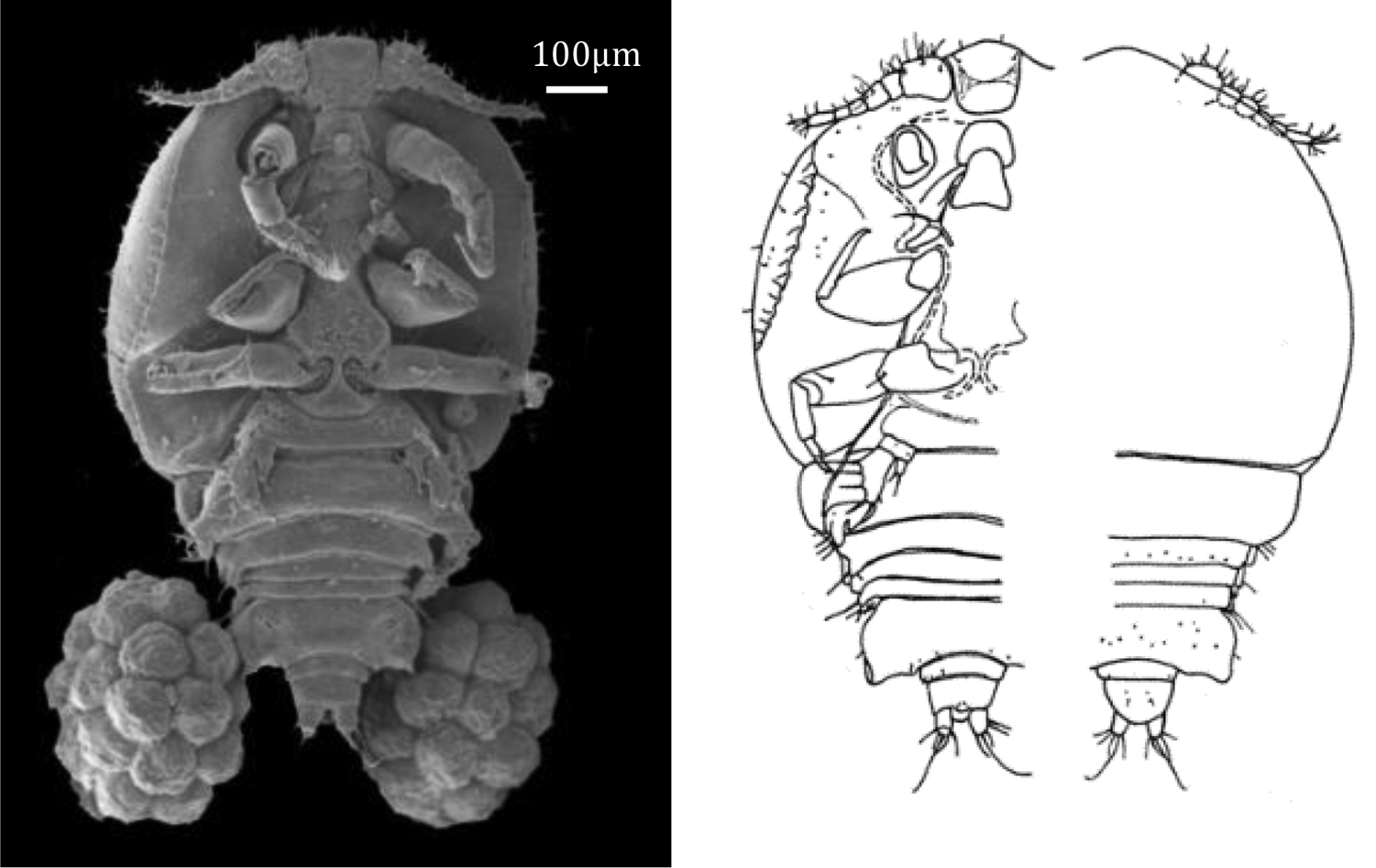
- A picture of Cancerilla oblonga

Scientific classification
- Domain: Eukaryota
- Kingdom: Animalia
- Phylum: Arthropoda
- Class: Copepoda
- Order: Siphonostomatoida
- Family: Cancerillidae

= Cancerillidae =

Family of crustaceans

Cancerillidae is a family of copepods belonging to the order Siphonostomatoida.

Genera:

- Cancerilla Dalyell, 1851
- Cancerillopsis Stephensen, 1933
- Microcancerilla Norman & Brady, 1909
- Ophiopsyllopsis Sebastian, 1968
- Ophiopsyllus Stock, Humes & Gooding, 1963
- Parartotrogus Scott & Scott, 1893
- Parophiopsyllus Humes & Hendler, 1972
