= Micropontiidae =

Scientific classification
- Domain: Eukaryota
- Kingdom: Animalia
- Phylum: Arthropoda
- Class: Copepoda
- Order: Siphonostomatoida
- Family: Micropontiidae

Family of crustaceans

Micropontiidae is a family of copepods belonging to the order Siphonostomatoida.

Genera:

- Micropontius Gooding, 1957
