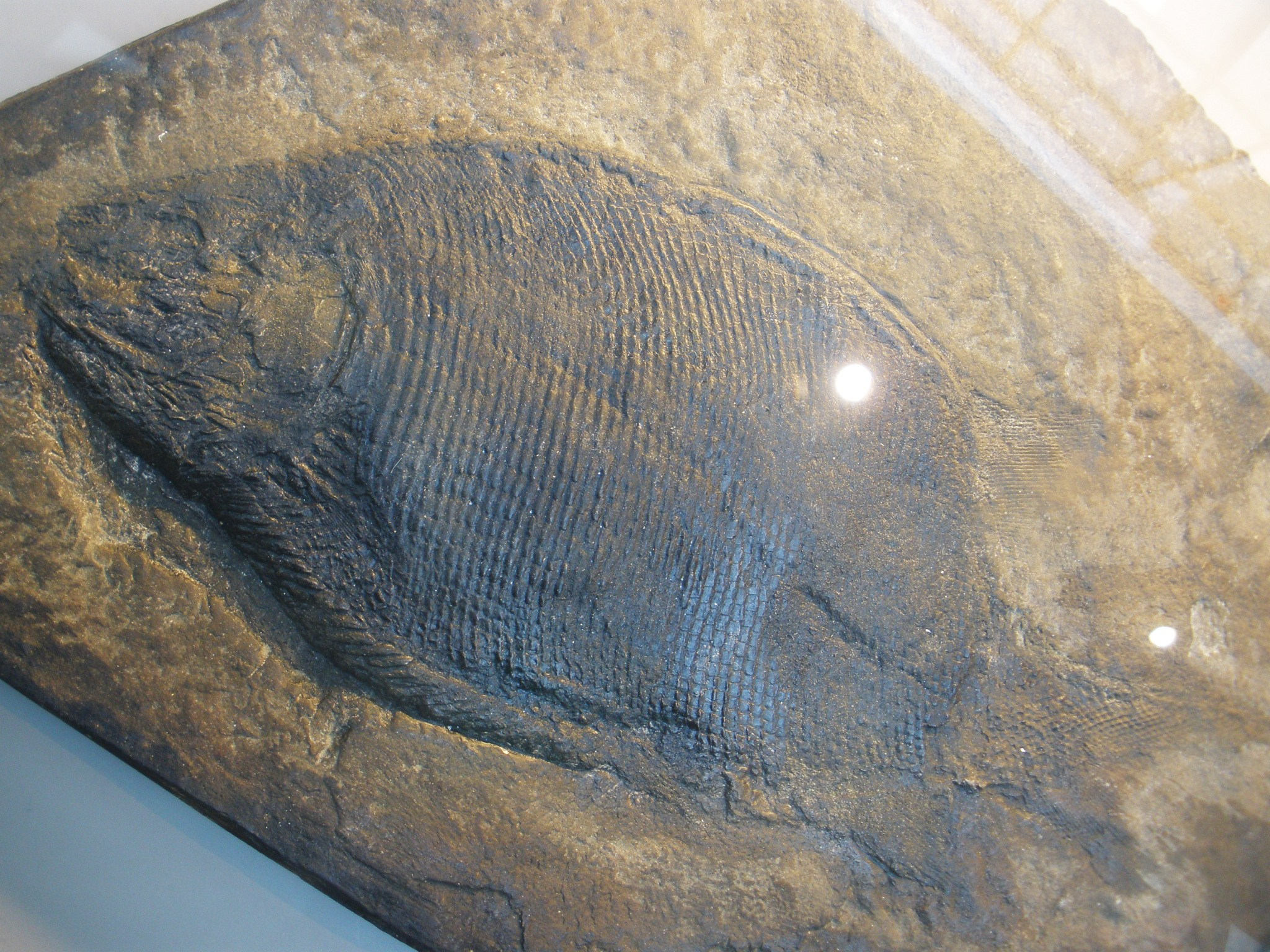
- Specimen at the Museum of Natural Sciences, Belgium

Scientific classification
- Kingdom: Animalia
- Phylum: Chordata
- Class: Actinopterygii
- Order: †Eurynotiformes
- Family: †Styracopteridae
- Genus: †Benedenius; Traquair, 1878

Species
- †B. deneensis (van Beneden, 1871); †B. soreili Fraipont, 1890

= Benedenius =

Benedenius Temporal range: Visean, 345–339 Ma

Extinct genus of ray-finned fishes

Benedenius is an extinct genus of prehistoric marine ray-finned fish. It is known from the Early Carboniferous of Belgium. It was named after Belgian paleontologist Pierre-Joseph van Beneden.

It contains two species:

- B. deneensis (van Beneden, 1871)
- B. soreili Fraipont, 1890

Formerly classified as a "paleonisciform", more recent studies suggest that it belongs to an early order of deep-bodied actinopterygians known as the Eurynotiformes. It is generally classified within the Styracopteridae, though at least one recent study treats it as a member of the Amphicentridae.

== See also ==
- Prehistoric fish
- List of prehistoric bony fish
