= Tanypleurus =

Scientific classification
- Domain: Eukaryota
- Kingdom: Animalia
- Phylum: Arthropoda
- Class: Copepoda
- Order: Siphonostomatoida
- Family: Tanypleuridae
- Genus: Tanypleurus; Steenstrup & Lütken, 1861
- Species: T. alcicornis

Binomial name
- Tanypleurus alcicornis Steenstrup & Lütken, 1861

Genus of crustaceans

Tanypleurus is a monotypic genus of crustaceans belonging to the monotypic family Tanypleuridae. The only species is Tanypleurus alcicornis.
