= Ecbathyriontidae =

Scientific classification
- Domain: Eukaryota
- Kingdom: Animalia
- Phylum: Arthropoda
- Class: Copepoda
- Order: Siphonostomatoida
- Family: Ecbathyriontidae

Family of crustaceans

Ecbathyriontidae is a family of crustaceans belonging to the order Siphonostomatoida.

Genera:

- Bathygordion Ivanenko & Martinez Arbizu, 2018
- Ecbathyrion Humes, 1987
