= Scottomyzon =

Scientific classification
- Domain: Eukaryota
- Kingdom: Animalia
- Phylum: Arthropoda
- Class: Copepoda
- Order: Siphonostomatoida
- Family: Scottomyzontidae
- Genus: Scottomyzon; Giesbrecht, 1897
- Species: S. gibberum

Binomial name
- Scottomyzon gibberum (Scott, 1894)

Genus of crustaceans

Scottomyzon is a monotypic genus of crustaceans belonging to the monotypic family Scottomyzontidae. The only species is Scottomyzon gibberum .
