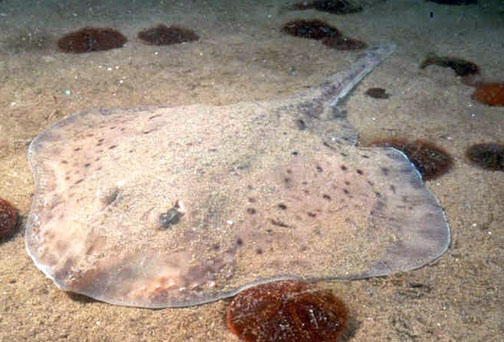

Conservation status
- Least Concern (IUCN 3.1)

Scientific classification
- Kingdom: Animalia
- Phylum: Chordata
- Class: Chondrichthyes
- Subclass: Elasmobranchii
- Order: Rajiformes
- Family: Rajidae
- Genus: Leucoraja
- Species: L. erinaceus

Binomial name
- Leucoraja erinaceus (Mitchill, 1825)
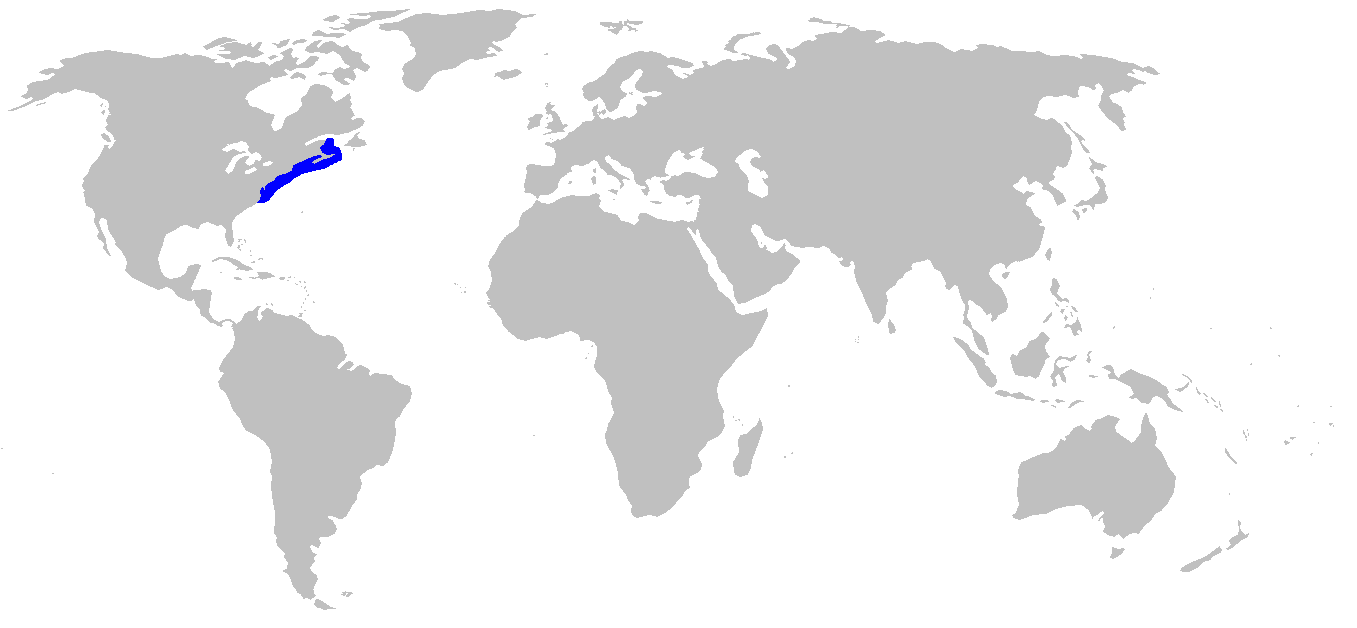
- Range of the little skate

Synonyms
- Raja erinaceus Mitchill, 1825; Leucoraja erinacea (Mitchill, 1825)

= Little skate =

Species of cartilaginous fish

The little skate (Leucoraja erinaceus) is a species of skate in the family Rajidae, found from Nova Scotia to North Carolina on sand or gravel habitats. They are one of the dominant members of the demersal fish community in the northwestern Atlantic. This species is of minimal commercial importance and is mainly used as bait for lobster traps, though its wings are also marketed for food. It is also important as a model organism for biological and medical research.

== Etymology ==
The specific epithet directly alludes to the genus Erinaceus which contains the common hedgehog, relating to its spines. This name is a noun in apposition, and therefore should not be emended by the gender of the genus to which it is allocated. However, the incorrect combination Leucoraja erinacea is often seen.

== Distribution and habitat ==
This skate is native to the western Atlantic Ocean, from Nova Scotia, Canada, to Cape Hatteras, North Carolina, USA. They are most abundant in the northern Mid-Atlantic Bight and the Georges Bank. Little skates prefer sandy or gravelly habitats from the shore to a depth of 90 meters (300 ft), though they have been caught as deep as 329 m (1,080 ft). They can tolerate temperatures of 1.2–21 °C (34.2–69.8 °F) and salinities of 27–35 ppt (though the optimum is 29–33 ppt). They do not undertake long migrations, but at some inshore parts of the species' range, individuals move into shallower water during the summer and deeper water during the fall and winter. In other sections of their range, they may be closer to shore in the spring and fall, and offshore in the summer and winter. Many also move north and south with changing temperatures at the southern extent of the range.

== Description ==
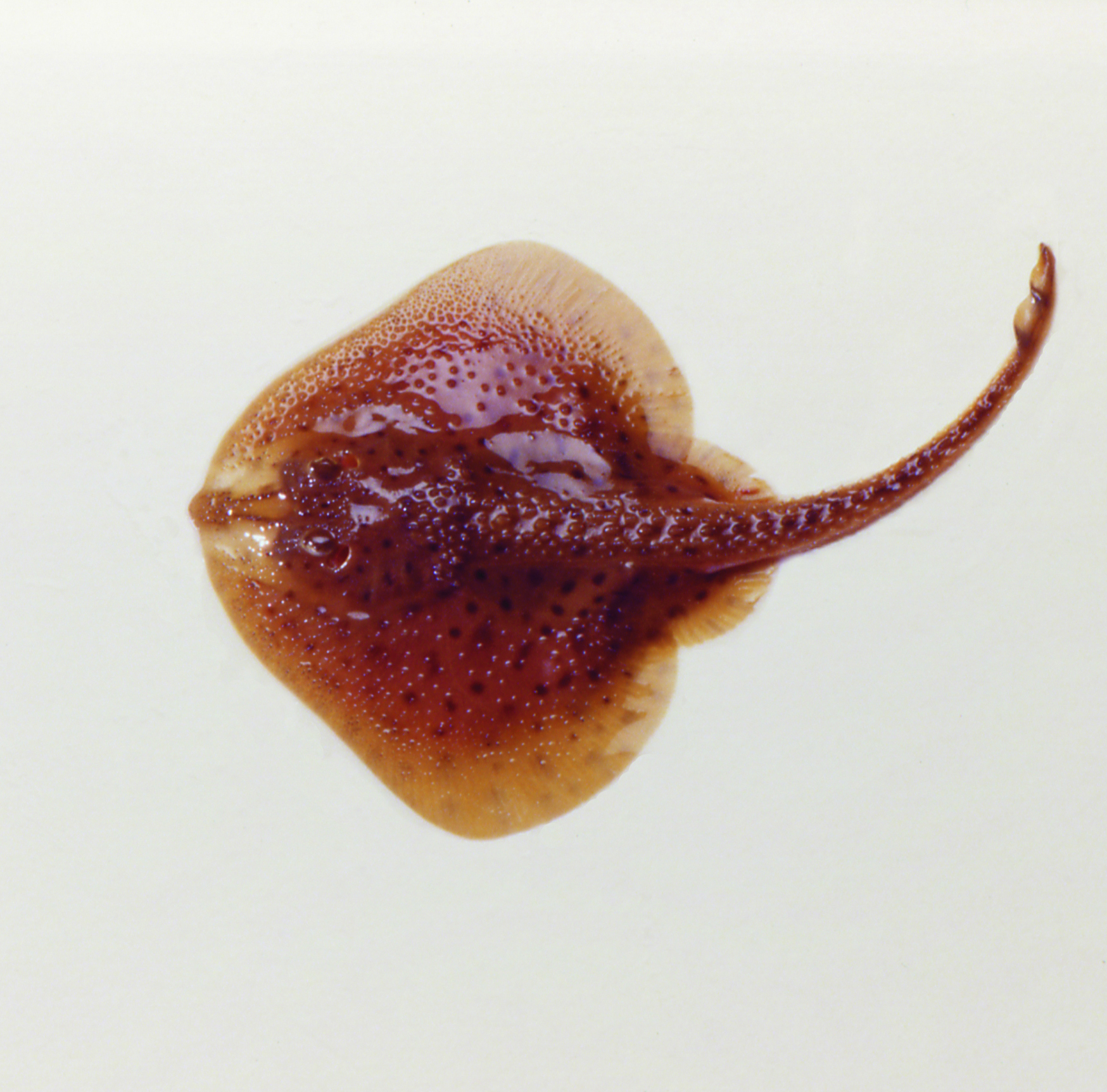
Dorsal view of a little skate

The little skate has a rounded pectoral fin disk 1.2 times as wide and long, and a blunt snout with a central tip. The jaws contain a 38–66 series of round teeth on plates, adapted for grinding food. The pelvic fins are divided into two parts, with the forward lobe modified into a leg-like structure. The tail is longer than the disk in juveniles and shorter in adults. Two small, closely spaced dorsal fins are located near the tip of the tail. Adults have small dermal denticles and usually no midline thorns, though there are strong spines on the dorsal surfaces of the head, shoulders, and tail. Males tend to have fewer spines than females.

The coloration of the little skate ranges from grayish to uniform or variable shades of brown above, becoming lighter towards the edges of the disk, and white or gray below. Most individuals have small, round, dark spots on the back. The tail has irregular dusky blotches or a dark gray ventral surface. The little skate may be confused with unspotted individuals of the winter skate (Leucoraja ocellata), which have a similar shape and distribution. This species typically measures 41–51 cm (16–20 in) long, but may reach 54 cm (21 in) long. Little skates grow to a larger maximum size in the northern part of their range.

== Biology and ecology ==
Little skates are more active at night and spend much of the day buried in sediment, usually near specific landscape features such as depressions excavated by other animals. They employ a mode of locomotion, dubbed "punting" by the first scientists to document it, to move over the sea floor. The forward lobes of the pelvic fins are modified into leg-like structures called "crura" (singular "crus"), containing three flexible joints and modified skeletal and muscular elements. The little skate pushes off the substrate with both crura and then glides a short distance on its wings while repositioning the crura for the next push. The crura are also used as pivots when the skate needs to turn. Research proposes that the locomotion is akin to that found in land vertebrates and thus puts the evolution of the underlying genes 20 million years earlier. It has been speculated that using the pelvic fins in this manner assists in hunting by reducing water turbulence that might alert the prey or distort the ray's electroreception.

The tail of the little skate contains an electric organ that intermittently generates a weak electric field (the electric organ discharge or EOD). The EOD lasts 70 ms and has a head-negative monophasic waveform. This electric organ is thought to function in communication, and may help potential mates locate one another.

Young and adult little skates are preyed upon by sharks, other skates, teleost fishes (including cod, goosefish, sea ravens, longhorn sculpins, bluefish, and summer flounder), gray seals, and rock crabs (Cancer irroratus). Their egg-cases are preyed on by the sea urchin Strongylocentrotus droebachiensis and the whelk Buccinum undatum. Known parasites of the little skate include the protozoans Caliperia brevipes, Haemogregarina delagei, and Trypanosoma rajae, the myxosporeans Chloromyxum leydigi and Leptotheca agilis, the nematode Pseudanisakis tricupola, and the copepods Eudactylina corrugata and Lernaeopodina longimana.

=== Feeding ===
The diet of the little skate consists mostly of decapod crustaceans and amphipods. Polychaete worms are also an important prey item. At the same time, other invertebrates (including isopods, bivalves, squid, sea squirts, and copepods) and small benthic fishes (including sand lances, herring, cunners, and cod) are rarely taken. The importance of crustaceans in the skate's diet increases with size. This species shares its benthic habitat with the similar winter skate; the little skate focuses more on epifauna (organisms living atop the substrate) while the winter skate eats more infauna (burrowing organisms). The little skate has an extremely high number of electrosensory ampullae of Lorenzini around its mouth, giving it a high degree of spatial precision when hunting for prey buried in the substrate.

=== Reproduction ===
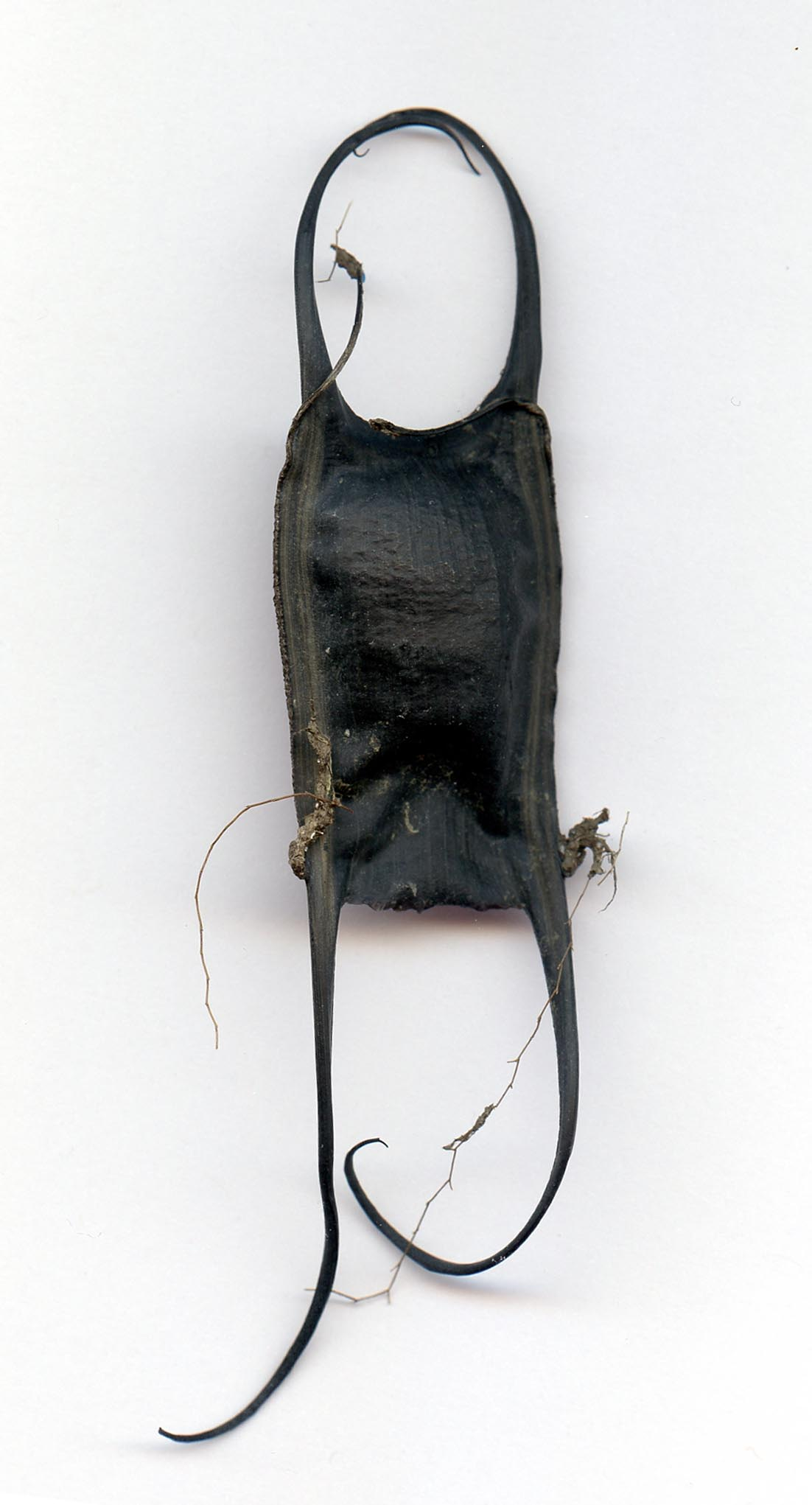
A dried-up egg case of the little skate, washed up on Long Beach, Long Island, New York, in October 2010

Little skates are oviparous. Mating occurs frequently throughout the year, and pregnant females can be found year-round. However, eggs are most common from October to December and from April to May, and least common from August to September and February to March. An average little skate spawns twice a year, in spring and fall, producing 10–35 eggs annually. Females deposit their egg capsules in pairs on sandy bottoms, in water no more than 27 m (89 ft) deep. The egg cases are amber-colored when first laid but become greenish-brown and leathery. Each roughly rectangular case contains a single fertilized egg and measures 44–63 mm (1.7–2.5 in) long and 30–45 mm (1.2–1.8 in) wide. There are hollow horns at each corner with sticky tendrils to secure the egg case to the substrate; the anterior horns are half as long as the case and curved inward, while the posterior horns are as long as the case and nearly straight.

Eggs raised in captivity hatch in 5–6 months, while those in the wild may take up to 12 months to hatch, depending on temperature. While inside the case, the embryos have a whip-like extension on the tail, believed to be used for circulating water. The newborns measure 93–102 mm (3.7–4.0 in) long and are perfectly formed miniatures of the adults. After hatching, the empty egg capsules wash ashore and are known as "mermaid's purses." Growth is about 10 cm (3.9 in) per year for the first three years, then slows down to 5 cm (2.0 in) per year between the third and fourth years. At adolescence, males become larger than females, and this difference persists through adulthood. Males mature at 32–43 cm (13–17 in) long and females at 36–45 cm (14–18 in) long. Very few little skates over 5 years old have been found, suggesting a high mortality rate.

An unusual little skate specimen from Fishers Island, New York, contained a developed testis, vas deferens, and functional clasper on its left side and an adolescent ovary, shell gland, oviduct, and abortive clasper on its right. This example of hermaphroditism (a bilateral gynandromorph) is one of the few known for elasmobranch fishes.

== Human interactions ==
Euell Gibbons promoted the consumption of the little skate by humans in his cookbook Stalking the Blue-eyed Scallop (1964), noting that its properly cut wings could be treated like scallops. Round cuts from the little skate's wings are marketed as "scallops," though their small size limits their commercial importance. Little skates are also often used to bait traps, especially for lobsters and eels. Skates are typically caught as bycatch in otter trawls; the little skate is not currently considered to be overfished. Along with the spiny dogfish (Squalus acanthias), the little skate is often used as a model organism in biomedical research. A BAC genomic library for the little skate was completed in January 2005.
