= Nanaspididae =

Scientific classification
- Domain: Eukaryota
- Kingdom: Animalia
- Phylum: Arthropoda
- Class: Copepoda
- Order: Siphonostomatoida
- Family: Nanaspididae

Family of copepods

Nanaspididae is a family of copepods belonging to the order Siphonostomatoida.

Genera:

- Allantogynus Changeux, 1960
- Honshia Avdeev, 2017
- Humesia Avdeev, 1980
- Nanaspis Humes & Cressey, 1959
- Stephopontius Thompson & Scott, 1903
