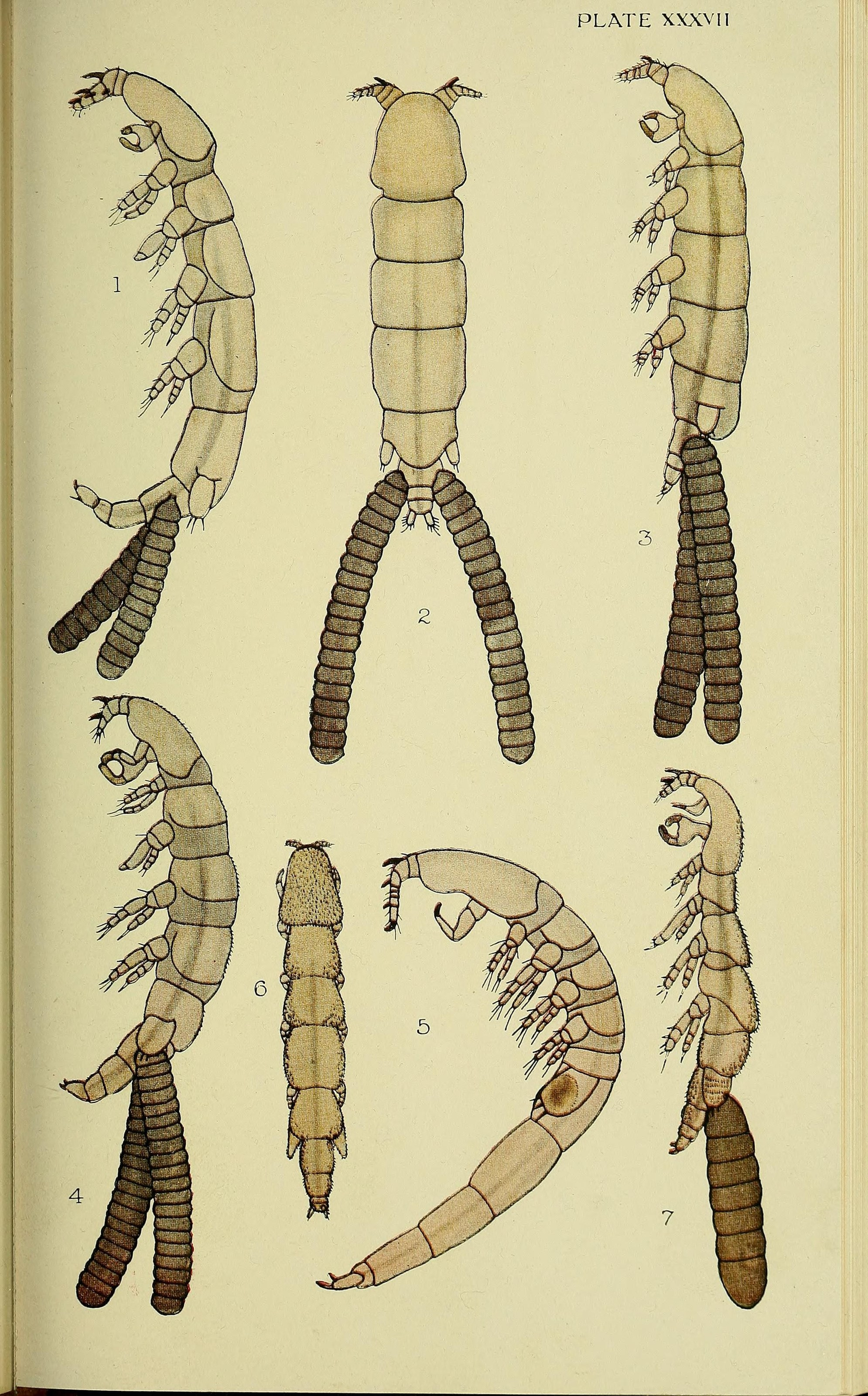
- Various species of Eudactylina

Scientific classification
- Kingdom: Animalia
- Phylum: Arthropoda
- Clade: Pancrustacea
- Class: Copepoda
- Order: Siphonostomatoida
- Family: Eudactylinidae; C. B. Wilson, 1932

= Eudactylinidae =

Family of crustaceans

Eudactylinidae is a family of copepods, most of which live as parasites on the gills of elasmobranch fishes; two genera lives on the gills of teleost fishes (Heterocladius and Jusheyus).

== Genera ==
The family Eudactylinidae contains the following genera:

- Bariaka Cressey, 1966
- Carnifossorius Deets & Ho, 1988
- Dangoka Izawa, 2011
- Eudactylina Van Beneden, 1853
- Eudactylinella C. B. Wilson, 1932
- Eudactylinodes C. B. Wilson, 1932
- Eudactylinopsis Pillai, 1968
- Heterocladius Deets & Ho, 1988
- Janinecaira Benz, Smith, Bullard & Braswell, 2007
- Jusheyus Deets & Benz, 1987
- Nemesis Risso, 1826
- Protodactylina Laubier, Maillard & Oliver, 1966
