= Codoba =

Scientific classification
- Domain: Eukaryota
- Kingdom: Animalia
- Phylum: Arthropoda
- Class: Copepoda
- Order: Siphonostomatoida
- Family: Codobidae
- Genus: Codoba; Heegaard, 1951
- Species: C. discoveryi

Binomial name
- Codoba discoveryi Heegaard, 1951

Genus of crustaceans

Codoba is a monotypic genus of crustaceans belonging to the monotypic family Codobidae. The only species is Codoba discoveryi.
