= Dinopontiidae =

Scientific classification
- Domain: Eukaryota
- Kingdom: Animalia
- Phylum: Arthropoda
- Class: Copepoda
- Order: Siphonostomatoida
- Family: Dinopontiidae

Family of crustaceans

Dinopontiidae is a family of crustaceans belonging to the order Siphonostomatoida.

Genera:

It has the AphiaID (LSID) -135518

- Dinopontius Stock, 1960
- Stenopontius Murnane, 1967
