= Entomolepididae =

Scientific classification
- Kingdom: Animalia
- Phylum: Arthropoda
- Class: Copepoda
- Order: Siphonostomatoida
- Family: Entomolepididae

Family of crustaceans

Entomolepididae is a family of crustaceans belonging to the order Siphonostomatoida.

Genera:

- Entomolepis Brady, 1899
- Entomopsyllus McKinnon, 1988
- Lepeopsyllus Thompson & Scott, 1903
- Paralepeopsyllus Ummerkutty, 1960
- Parmulella Stock, 1992
- Parmulodes Wilson, 1944
- Spongiopsyllus Johnsson, 2000
