= Calverocheres =

Scientific classification
- Domain: Eukaryota
- Kingdom: Animalia
- Phylum: Arthropoda
- Class: Copepoda
- Order: Siphonostomatoida
- Family: Calverocheridae
- Genus: Calverocheres; Wilson, 1932

Genus of crustaceans

Calverocheres is a genus of crustaceans belonging to the monotypic family Calverocheridae.

The species of this genus are found in Europe, Malesia.

Species:

- Calverocheres engeli Stock, 1971
- Calverocheres globosus (Hansen, 1902)
- Calverocheres oblongus Stephensen, 1935
