= Asterocheridae =

Scientific classification
- Kingdom: Animalia
- Phylum: Arthropoda
- Clade: Pancrustacea
- Class: Copepoda
- Order: Siphonostomatoida
- Family: Asterocheridae; Giesbrecht, 1899

Family of crustaceans

Asterocheridae is a family of copepods belonging to the order Siphonostomatoida.

== Genera ==
Asterocheridae contains the following genera:

- Acontiophorus Brady, 1880
- Amalomyzon Kim I.H. & T.J. Lee, 2023
- Andapontius Lee, J. & I.H. Kim, 2017
- Asterocheres Boeck, 1859
- Asterocheroides Malt, 1991
- Asteropontella Stock, 1989
- Asteropontius Thompson I.C. & Scott A., 1903
- Asteropontoides Stock, 1975
- Asteropontopsis Stock, 1987
- Australomyzon Nicholls, 1944
- Bythocheres Humes, 1988
- Callomyzon Kim I.H., 2016
- Cecidomyzon Stock, 1981
- Cephalocheres Kim I.H., 2010
- Chelacheres Stock & Humes, 1995
- Cheramomyzon Humes, 1989
- Cletopontius Thompson I.C. & Scott A., 1903
- Collocheres Canu, 1893
- Collocherides Stock, 1971
- Cyclocheres Kim I.H., 2010
- Cystomyzon Stock, 1981
- Darumamyzon Ogawa & Matsuzaki, 2015
- Dermatomyzon Claus, 1889
- Discopontius Nicholls, 1944
- Dokdocheres Kim I.H. & T.J. Lee, 2023
- Doropontius Thompson I.C. & Scott A., 1903
- Gascardama Kim I.H., 2010
- Gerulusosacculus Ivanenko & Defaye, 2004
- Glyptocheres Humes, 1987
- Gomumucheres Humes, 1996
- Hammatimyzon Stock, 1981
- Hermacheres Stock, 1987
- Hetairosyna Humes, 1991
- Hetairosynella Kim I.H., 2010
- Hetairosynopsis Humes, 1996
- Holobinus Lee, J. & I.H. Kim, 2017
- Humescheres Kim I.H., 2005
- Humesimyzon Kim I.H., 2010
- Indomyzon Ummerkutty, 1966
- Inermocheres Boxshall, 1990
- Kimcheres Bandera & Conradi, 2016
- Kolocheres Johnsson, 1999
- Laperocheres Ivanenko, 1998
- Meandromyzon Stock, 1989
- Mesocheres Norman & Scott T., 1905
- Mimacheres Leigh-Sharpe, 1934
- Monocheres Stock, 1966
- Neoasterocheres Canário, Rocha, Neves & Johnsson, 2017
- Obesiella Ridewood, 1903
- Oedomyzon Stock, 1981
- Onychocheres Stock & Gooding, 1986
- Ophiurocheres Humes, 1998
- Orecturus Humes, 1992
- Paracontiophorus Eiselt, 1961
- Parasterocheres Humes, 1996
- Parasteropontius Johnsson, 1999
- Paurocheres Lee J. & I.H. Kim, 2018
- Peltomyzon Stock, 1975
- Phyllocheres Humes, 1996
- Platymyzon Lee J. & I.H. Kim, 2018
- Psilomyzon Stock, 1965
- Rhynchomyzon Giesbrecht, 1895
- Scottocheres Giesbrecht, 1897
- Setacheres Johnsson, Bahia & Neves, 2016
- Sinopontius Boxshall, 1990
- Siphonopontius Malt, 1991
- Stenomyzon Kim I.H., 2010
- Stockmyzon Bandera & Huys, 2008
- Thermocheres Kim I.H., 2010
- Tuphacheres Stock, 1965
- Tychomyzon Humes, 1991
