= Pontoeciella =

Scientific classification
- Domain: Eukaryota
- Kingdom: Animalia
- Phylum: Arthropoda
- Class: Copepoda
- Order: Siphonostomatoida
- Family: Pontoeciellidae
- Genus: Pontoeciella; Giesbrecht, 1895
- Species: P. abyssicola

Binomial name
- Pontoeciella abyssicola (Scott, 1893)

Genus of crustaceans

Pontoeciella is a monotypic genus of crustaceans belonging to the monotypic family Pontoeciellidae. The only species is Pontoeciella abyssicola.

The species is found in Pacific and Atlantic Ocean.
