= Dichelesthiidae =

Scientific classification
- Domain: Eukaryota
- Kingdom: Animalia
- Phylum: Arthropoda
- Class: Copepoda
- Order: Siphonostomatoida
- Family: Dichelesthiidae

Synonyms
- Anthosomatidae; Anthosomidae

Dichelesthiidae is a family of copepods belonging to the order Siphonostomatoida.

Genera:

- Anthosoma Leach, 1816
- Dichelesthium Hermann, 1804
- Kabatarina Cressey & Boxshall, 1989
