= Pierre-Joseph van Beneden =

Belgian zoologist and paleontologist

Pierre-Joseph Van Beneden
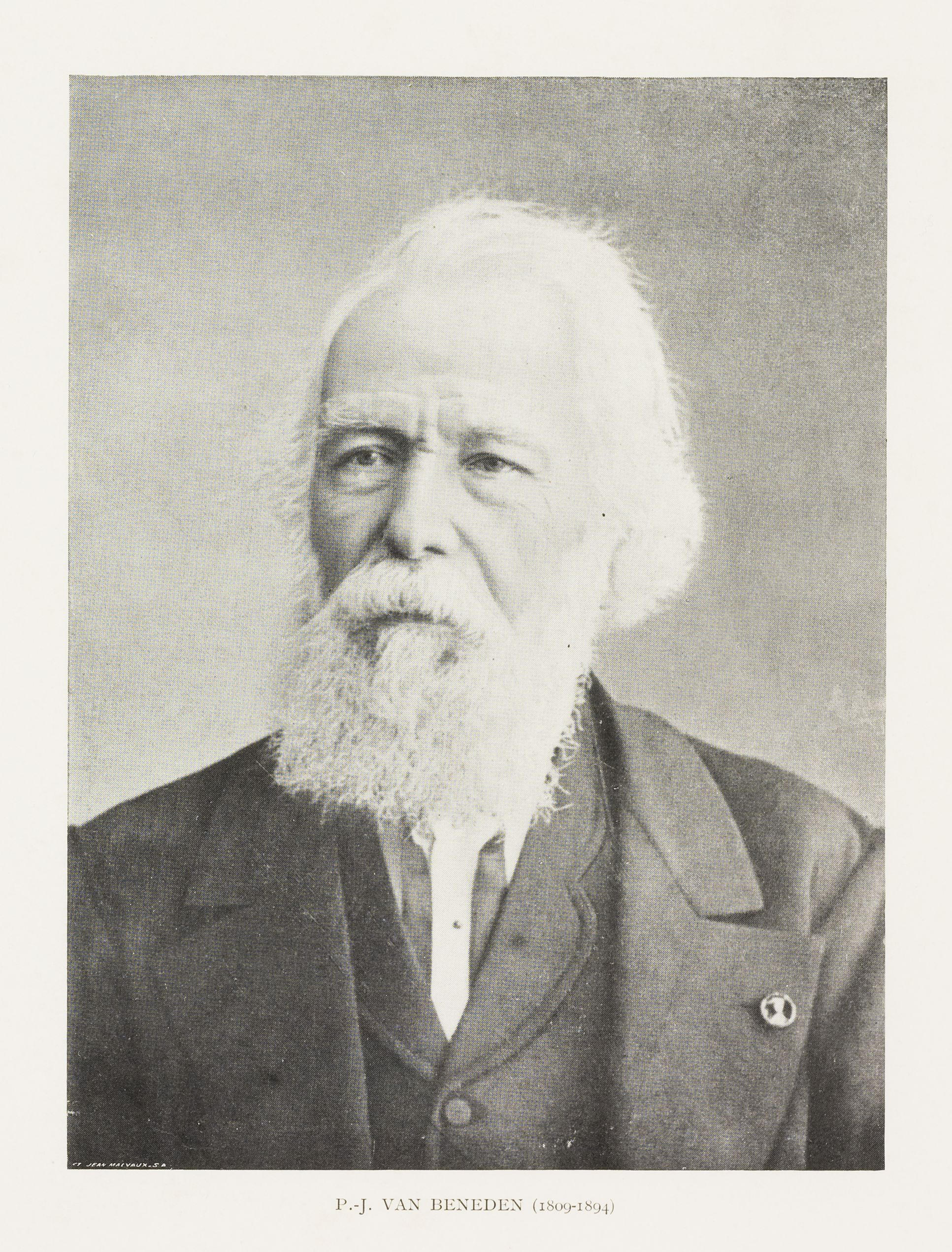
- Pierre-Joseph Van Beneden
- Born: 19 December 1809; Mechelen, First French Empire
- Died: 8 January 1894 (aged 84); Leuven, Belgium
- Education: University of Louvain
- Scientific career
- Fields: zoology paleontology

Pierre-Joseph Van Beneden FRS FRSE FGS FZS (19 December 1809 – 8 January 1894) was a Belgian zoologist and paleontologist. He is credited with introducing the terms "mutualism" and "commensalism" into biology in 1875 and 1876 respectively.

== Life ==
Born in Mechelen, then part of the First French Empire, he studied medicine at the State University of Leuven and studied zoology in Paris under Georges Cuvier (1769–1832). In 1831, he became curator at the natural history museum in Leuven, and from 1836 until 1894, was a professor of zoology at the Catholic University of Leuven. In 1842, he became a member of the Académie des sciences de Belgique, becoming its President in 1881. In 1875, he became a foreign member of the Royal Society of London, and in 1884, an Honorary Fellow of the Royal Society of Edinburgh.

He was the father of biologist Edouard van Beneden (1846–1910). Pierre-Joseph van Beneden died at age 84 in Leuven, Belgium. He was a devout Catholic and, as the writer of his obituary for the Royal Society states, always exhibited "the widest toleration for the views of others".

== Work ==
Van Beneden was a specialist in the field of parasitology, being known for his comprehensive studies on the development, transformation, and life-histories of parasitic worms. In 1858, a treatise on this subject won the Grand prix des sciences physiques of the Institut de France. It was published in the "International Scientific Series" (1875), under the title Les commensaux et les parasites dans le règne animal and was translated into English and German.

He did extensive research in marine biology, and in 1843, established one of the world's first aquarium and marine laboratory in Ostend. With French zoologist Paul Gervais (1816–1879), he published an important work on extinct and living cetaceans titled Ostéographie des Cétacés, vivants et fossiles. His interest in this matter had begun during the excavations rendered necessary by the fortifying of Antwerp, when a number of bones of fossil whales were exposed to view. His papers on the extinct species found near Antwerp were published in the Annales du musée royal d'histoire naturelle de Brucelles, and with them was incorporated a description of the fossil seals which were discovered in the same area.

He introduced the term mutualism in his work Les Commensaux et les Parasites (1875). He had used the term earlier in 1873 in a communication to the Royal Academy of Belgium.

== Distinctions ==
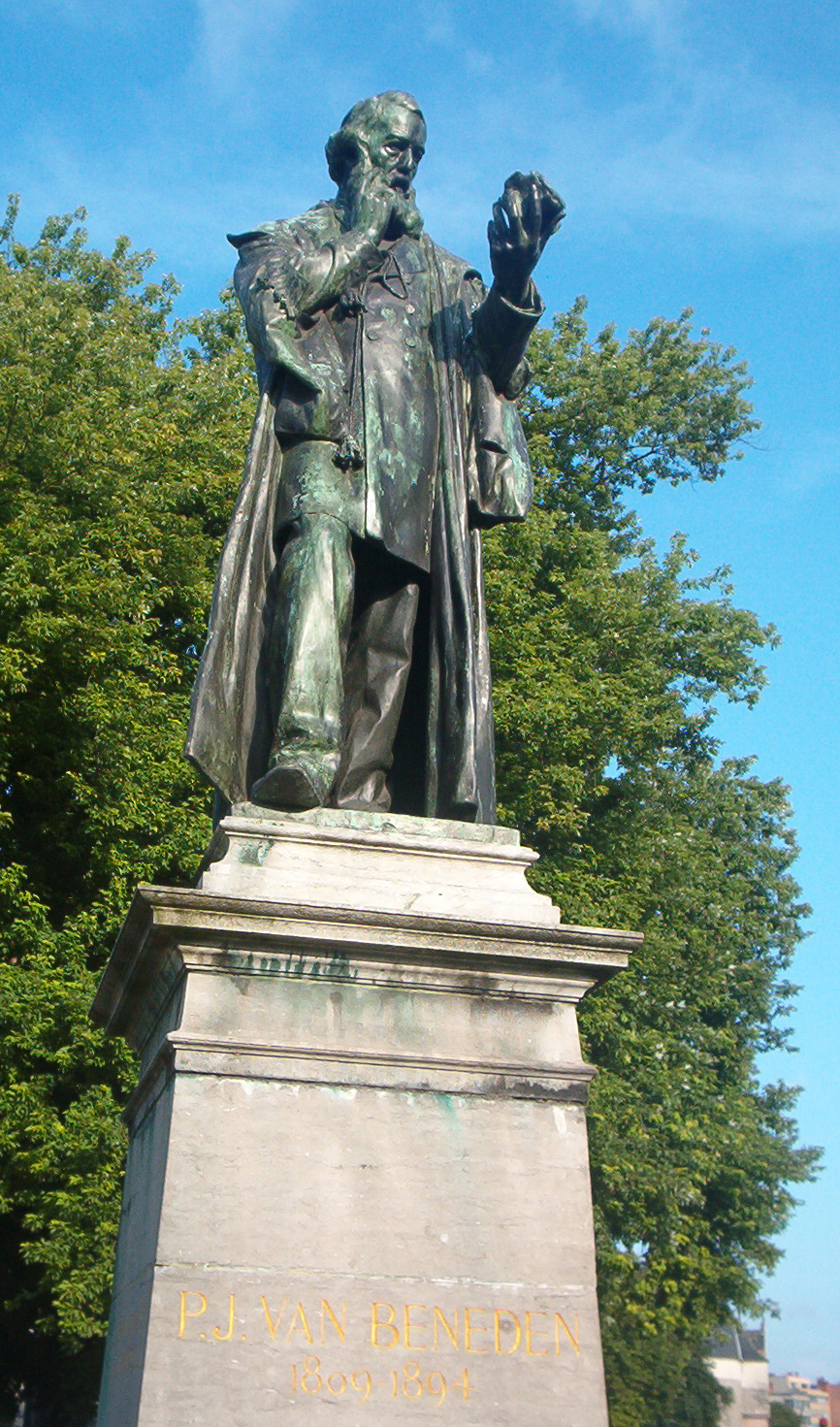
Pierre-Joseph van Beneden (statue in Mechelen)

Van Beneden attended the celebration of the tercentenary of the University of Edinburgh and was there made an honorary LL.D. He was a foreign member of the Royal Society and also of the Linnæan, Geological, and Zoological societies of London. He was president of the Royal Belgian Academy in 1881, and was created Grand Officer of the Order of Leopold on the occasion of his professorial jubilee. He was elected a Foreign Honorary Member of the American Academy of Arts and Sciences in 1886. He became a foreign member of the Royal Netherlands Academy of Arts and Sciences in 1859.

The extinct Carboniferous fish Benedenius is named after him, whose type species van Beneden had initially described as Paleoniscus deneensis.

== Books ==
A selection of books by Pierre-Joseph van Beneden with full text available.

- Mémoire sur les vers intestinaux (1858)
- Recherches sur la faune littorale de Belgique: crustacés (1861)
- Les poissons des côtes de Belgique, leurs parasite et leurs commensaux (1870)
- Animal parasites and messmates (1876)
- Histoire naturelle des balénoptères (1888)
- Histoire naturelle des cétacés des mers d'Europe (1889)

== Other sources ==
- Brice Poreau, Biologie et complexité : histoire et modèles du commensalisme. Thesis, largely based on the work by Pierre-Joseph Van Beneden. Thèse d'université, Université Lyon 1, France, 4 July 2014. PDF, 351 pages (in French with English abstract)
