= Zbigniew Kabata =

Polish parasitologist (1924–2014)

- Born: 17 March 1924; Jeremicze, Poland
- Died: 4 July 2014 (aged 90)
- Education: Marshal Józef Piłsudski Military Academy in Lwów, University of Aberdeen (PhD 1959, D.Sc. 1966)
- Known for: The Underground Army
- Awards: Silver Cross of the Order of Virtuti Militari, Cross of Valour, War Medal, Underground Army Cross, Partisan Cross, Gold Medal for Contributions to the Defensiveness of the Country. A. Wardle Medal (Canadian Society of Zoologists), K. Janicki Medal (Polish Parasitological Society), K. Demel Medal (Sea Fisheries Institute in Gdynia, Poland; Immigrant Achievement Award (Law Society of Canada)
- Scientific career
- Fields: Soldier, parasitologist, poet, fisherman
- Institutions: Pacific Biological Station, Nanaimo, British Columbia

Zbigniew 'Bob' Kabata, CM (17 March 1924 – 4 July 2014) was a Polish parasitologist, veteran of the Polish Armia Krajowa during World War II, poet, fisherman, translator and scientific administrator.

== Early life ==
Kabata was born into a military family in Jeremicze, Poland on 17 March 1924. He entered the Marshal Józef Piłsudski Military Academy in Lwów as a cadet in 1937.

== World War II ==
After the invasion of Poland by Nazi forces in 1939, Kabata joined the Armia Krajowa and fought against the occupying forces. His unit became famous after assaults on two Gestapo jails, which resulted in the liberation of about 200 prisoners. Kabata was cited several times for bravery. During his time in the resistance, Kabata wrote several patriotic poems honouring the Polish armed forces. His most famous work, The Underground Army, became the unofficial anthem of the Polish combatant community and is inscribed on numerous Polish war memorials.

Following the defeat of Nazi forces in Poland, Kabata made a daring escape across Soviet lines to join up with the Polish 2nd Army Corps in Italy and commanded a rifle platoon in the 3rd Company, 1st Carpathian Rifles (the famous "Tobruk Rats").

== After the war ==
After demobilisation, he was transferred to Great Britain when Italy signed a peace treaty with the Allies and found work as a deck-hand on North Sea trawlers. Kabata became fascinated with marine life and registered for a zoology degree. After graduation, he began work at the Fisheries Laboratory in Aberdeen as a specialist in fish parasitology, while at the same time following postgraduate courses that gained him a PhD (1959) and D.Sc. (1966) from the University of Aberdeen. It was in this time that Kabata developed the notion that separate populations of fish can be identified by study of the prevalence of various parasites and diseases. The identification of populations is an integral part of fisheries science.

In September 1953, Kabata, then still an undergraduate student, married an Irish physician, Mary Ann Montgomery. The couple had a daughter, Marta, in 1954 and a son, Andrzej, in 1956.

During the 1960s, Dr Kabata translated a number of Russian texts on fish biology and parasitology. It was during this time that he began work on his main work, The Parasitic Copepoda of British Fishes, published in 1979 by the Ray Society, ISBN 0-903874-05-9. A seminal work in taxonomy, this book features over 2,000 original hand-drawn illustrations of the complex morphology of copepod parasites.

In 1967, Kabata moved to the Pacific Biological Station in Nanaimo, British Columbia, where he became head of the Marine Fisheries Section.

He died on 4 July 2014.

== Awards and recognition ==
His outstanding contribution to the field of parasitology was awarded with patronymy of 22 taxa, including most notably, the imaginatively named copepod, Bobkabata kabatabobus. He served for 15 years on the editorial board of the International Commission on Zoological Nomenclature.

Kabata held the rank of lieutenant colonel in the Polish army, and was awarded one of Poland's highest decorations, the Grand Commander Cross of the Order of Polonia Restituta. For exceptional heroism during the war, he was awarded a Silver Cross of the Order of Virtuti Militari, twice the Cross of Valour, War Medal (three bars), Underground Army Cross, Partisan Cross and Gold Medal for Contributions to the Defensiveness of the Country.

For his contribution to world science, he received the A. Wardle Medal from the Canadian Society of Zoologists, K. Janicki Medal from the Polish Parasitological Society and K. Demel Medal from the Sea Fisheries Institute in Gdynia, Poland. Other honours included honorary membership in four scientific societies, an honorary D.Sc. from the Agricultural University of Szczecin, Poland (1993), an honorary D.Litt. from Malaspina University College, Nanaimo, B.C. Canada (2002) and an Eminent Parasitologist Award from the American Society of Parasitologists (2004). He was also made an honorary citizen by the Polish city of Sandomierz in the year 2000. The Law Society of Canada, Immigration Branch, granted him a newly established Immigrant Achievement Award in April 2002. In 2007, he became a Member of the Order of Canada.
