= Charles Branch Wilson =

American scientist

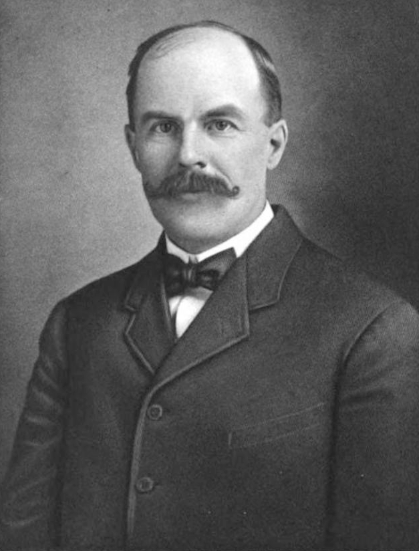
- Born: October 20, 1861; Exeter, Maine
- Died: August 18, 1941 (aged 79); Westfield, Massachusetts
- Education: Colby College, Johns Hopkins University
- Scientific career
- Fields: Marine Biology, Copepodology
- Author abbrev. (zoology): C.B. Wilson

Charles Branch Wilson (October 20, 1861 – August 18, 1941) was an American scientist, a marine biologist. He is known for his extensive work on copepods, minute crustaceans.

== Early life and education ==
Charles Branch Wilson was born in Exeter, Maine on October 20, 1861. He received his bachelor's and master's degree from Colby College of Waterville, Maine. He completed his doctorate from the Johns Hopkins University in 1910.

== Career ==
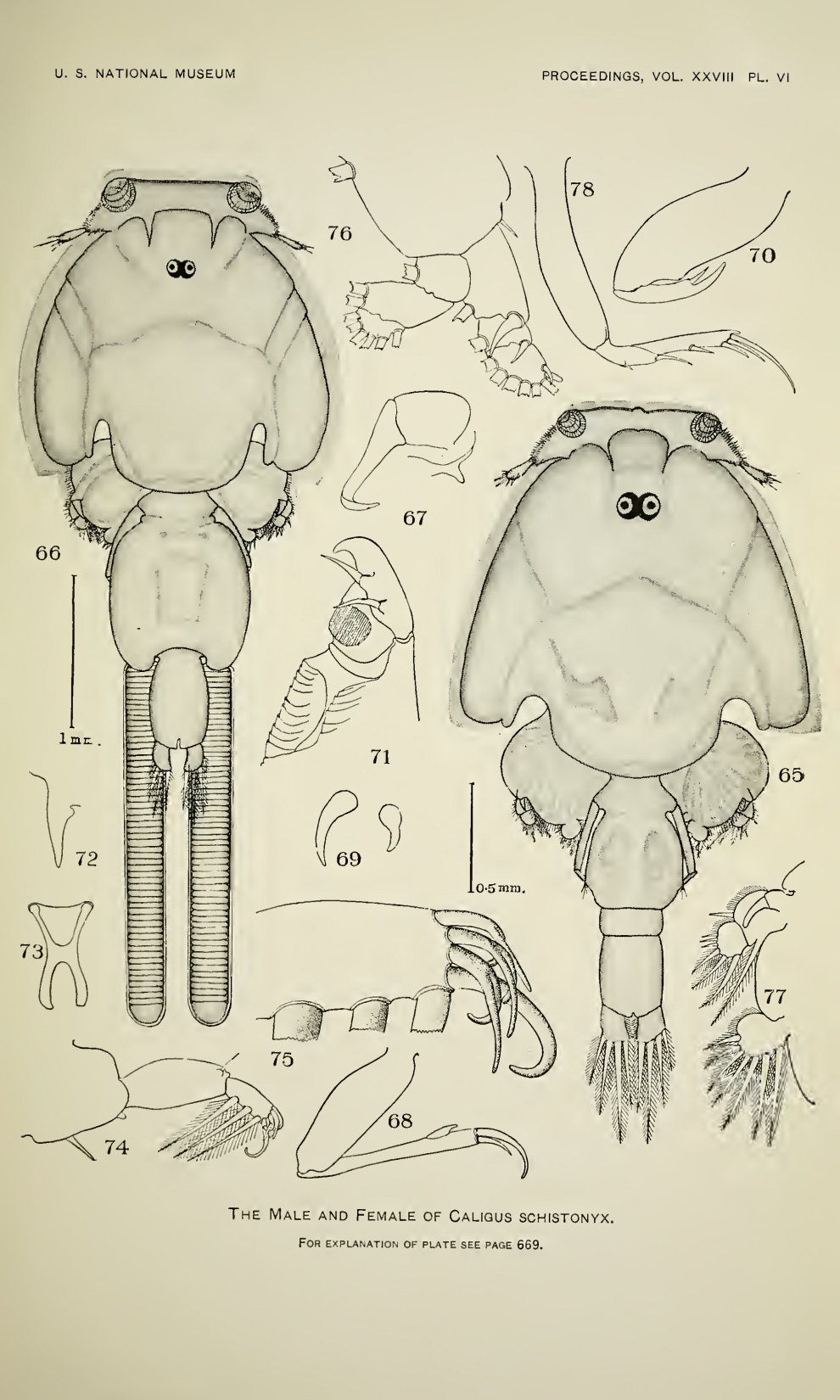
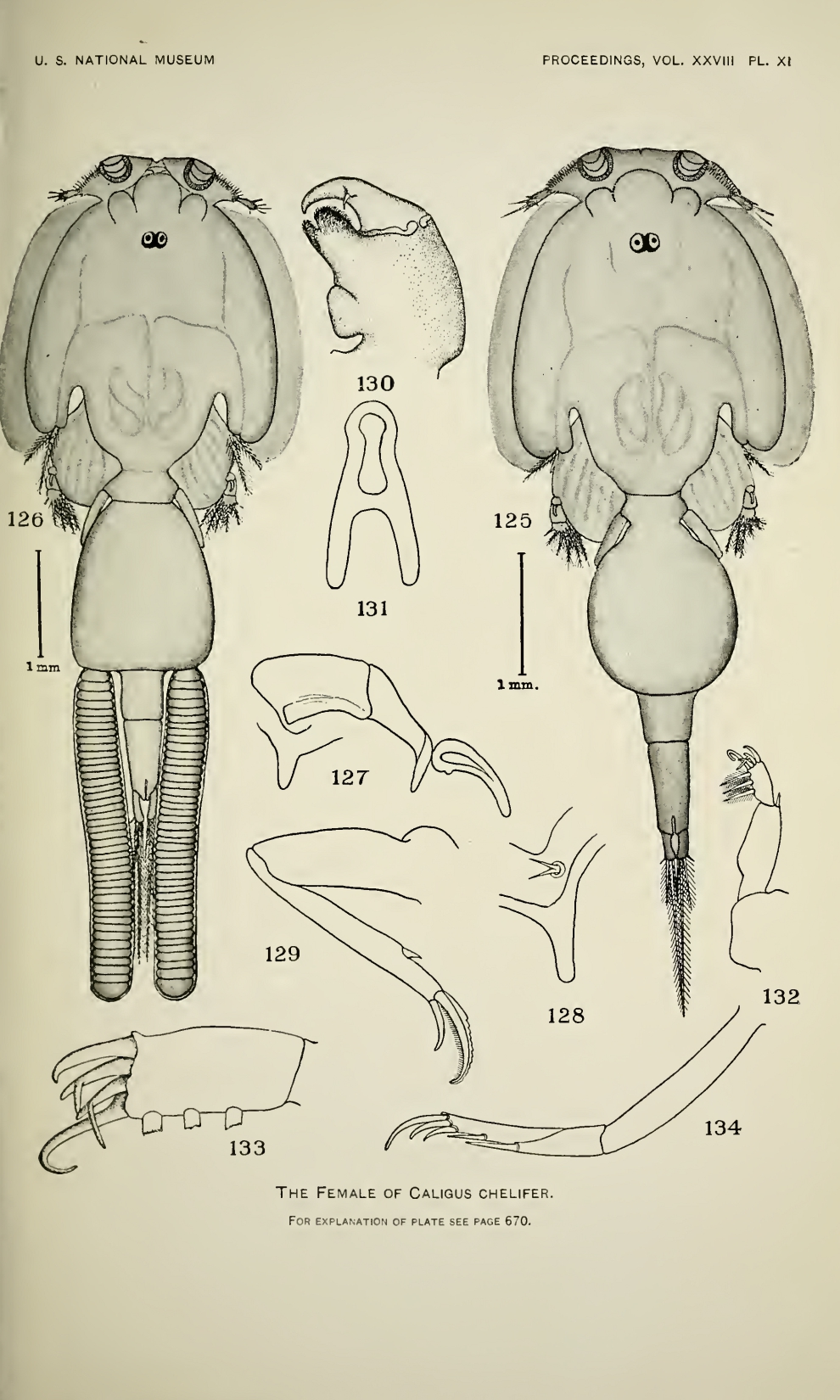
Drawings of the copepods Caligus schistonyx (left) and Caligus chelifer (right) in one of Wilson's monographs on the United States National Museum's copepod collection

While completing his master's degree, Wilson worked in Colby as a tutor in botany. In 1891, he was appointed a professor of science at the Gorham Normal School of Gorham, Maine (now the University of Southern Maine). In 1896, he became a professor of natural science at the Westfield Teachers College of Westfield, Massachusetts (now the Westfield State University). A year later he became a professor of biology and the head of the Science Department in Westfield, a position he held until his retirement in 1932. During the summer of the same year, he worked at the Johns Hopkins University marine laboratory in Port Antonio, Jamaica; the first of several such field trips during his career.

In the summer of 1899, he worked at the United States Fish Commission's Marine Biological Laboratory, investigating parasitic copepods of food fish. This was the first of a lifelong association with the Commission, which became the United States Bureau of Fisheries in 1902. Among his collaborations with the Bureau were economic surveys of the Lake Maxinkuckee (1906), Mississippi River (1907), Maumee River (1908), Kankakee River (1909), Cumberland River (1911), and the lakes of northern Minnesota (1912). He officially served under the capacity of an economic investigator for the Fairport, Iowa Bureau of Fisheries from 1913 to 1923. From 1928 to 1929, he also assisted in the economic survey of Lake Erie.

Wilson's association with the United States National Museum (now the National Museum of Natural History) of the Smithsonian Institution began in February 1901. The museum's entire collection of copepods was entrusted to him for identification and study. Wilson published the results in the museum's publications, the Proceedings of the United States National Museum and the Bulletin of the United States National Museum (both journals have now been discontinued). He was encouraged in his work by the American biologist Waldo L. Schmitt, who joined the staff of the United States National Museum in 1915. Schmitt's work also primarily dealt with crustaceans. Wilson was named an Honorary Collaborator by the museum in recognition of his work in 1933.

His greatest works are three monographs on copepods. The first monograph, published in 1928 to 1929, was the most important in Wilson's opinion. It involved a collaboration of the United States National Museum and the Carnegie Institution for Science. It dealt with the copepods in marine samples taken by the ill-fated research vessel Carnegie. The second monograph dealt with the description of six new genera and fifteen new species of parasitic copepods from the museum's collections. The third and the last monograph was on the copepods collected during the voyages of the United States Fish Commission's marine research vessel USS Albatross, from her long voyage into the Pacific Ocean beginning in 1887 to the three-year Philippine Expedition in 1907 to 1910. He described a total of 32 new species and identified the previously unknown opposite sex of 28 other species.

Aside from studying copepods and teaching, Wilson also wrote papers on the embryology of amphibians, sipunculid, and nemertean worms; the biology and economic importance of dragonflies, damselflies, freshwater mussels, and aquatic hemipterans and coleopterans; as well as the results of the various surveys of the Bureau of Fisheries.

== See also ==
- Waldo L. Schmitt
- Mildred Stratton Wilson
