= Amblyeleotris harrisorum =

Conservation status
- Data Deficient (IUCN 3.1)

Scientific classification
- Kingdom: Animalia
- Phylum: Chordata
- Class: Actinopterygii
- Division: Teleostei
- Order: Gobiiformes
- Family: Gobiidae
- Genus: Amblyeleotris
- Species: A. harrisorum

Binomial name
- Amblyeleotris harrisorum Mohlmann & J. E. Randall, 2002

Species of fish

Amblyeleotris harrisorum , is a species of marine ray-finned fish belonging to the subfamily Gobiinae, the sea gobies, in the family Gobiidae, the typical gobies. This fish is endemic to Kiribati.

== Taxonomy ==
Amblyeleotris harrisorum was first formally described in 2002 by the American ichthyologists Mark S. Mohlmann and John Ernest Randall with its type localuty given as Lionfish Wall at 1°42'N, 157°10'W, Kiritimati in the Line Islands. The genus Amblyeleotris belongs to the subfamily Gobiinae of the goby family Gobiidae, in the suborder Gobioidei of the order Gobiiformes.

== Etymology ==
Amblyeleotris harrisorum is classified in the genus Amblyeleotris, a name which prefixes trhe genus bname Eleotris woth ambly-, which emans "blunt" and is a reference to the blunt head of Eleotris periophthalmus, the type species of the genus. The specific name harrisorum honors Mr. and Mrs. Hamilton Harris, friends of Randall's, who sponsored the field effort at Kiritimati..

== Description ==
Amblyeleotris harrisorum is an elongated goby up to 7.3 centimetres (2.9 in) standard length. The background colour is white marked with five vertical pale orange bars. It is most readily distinguished from its congeners by its very colourful caudal fin, bright yellow with orange and blue margin and also by an oblique yellow stripe behind the eye.

== Distribution and habitat ==
Amblyeleotris harrisorum is only known from reefs around the island of Kiritimati in the Line Islands, Republic of Kiribati, in the central Pacific. It occurs at depths of 24–37 metres (79–121 ft). As with other Amblyeleotris species, it has a symbiotic relationship with alpheid shrimps.
