= Amblyeleotris marquesas =

Conservation status
- Least Concern (IUCN 3.1)

Scientific classification
- Kingdom: Animalia
- Phylum: Chordata
- Class: Actinopterygii
- Order: Gobiiformes
- Family: Gobiidae
- Genus: Amblyeleotris
- Species: A. marquesas

Binomial name
- Amblyeleotris marquesas Mohlmann & J. E. Randall, 2002

Species of fish

Amblyeleotris marquesas is a species of goby. It is endemic to the Marquesas Islands, French Polynesia, in the central Pacific Ocean. It occurs at depths of 6 to 40 metres (20 to 131 ft). As with other species of their genus, this species has a symbiotic relationship with alpheid shrimps, in this case Alpheus randalli, one or a pair of gobies sharing a burrow with one or a pair of shrimps.

This is an elongated goby up to 6.9 centimetres (2.7 in) standard length. It has a highly distinctive colour pattern: The background colour is pale green, white ventrally, marked with four broad vertical brownish red bars interspersed with four narrower, darker bars.
