= A. garricki =

A. garricki may refer to:

- Aethon garricki, a species of copepod in the family Lernanthropidae
- Alpheopsis garricki, a species of pistol shrimp in the genus Alpheopsis
- Apristurus garricki, a species of shark
