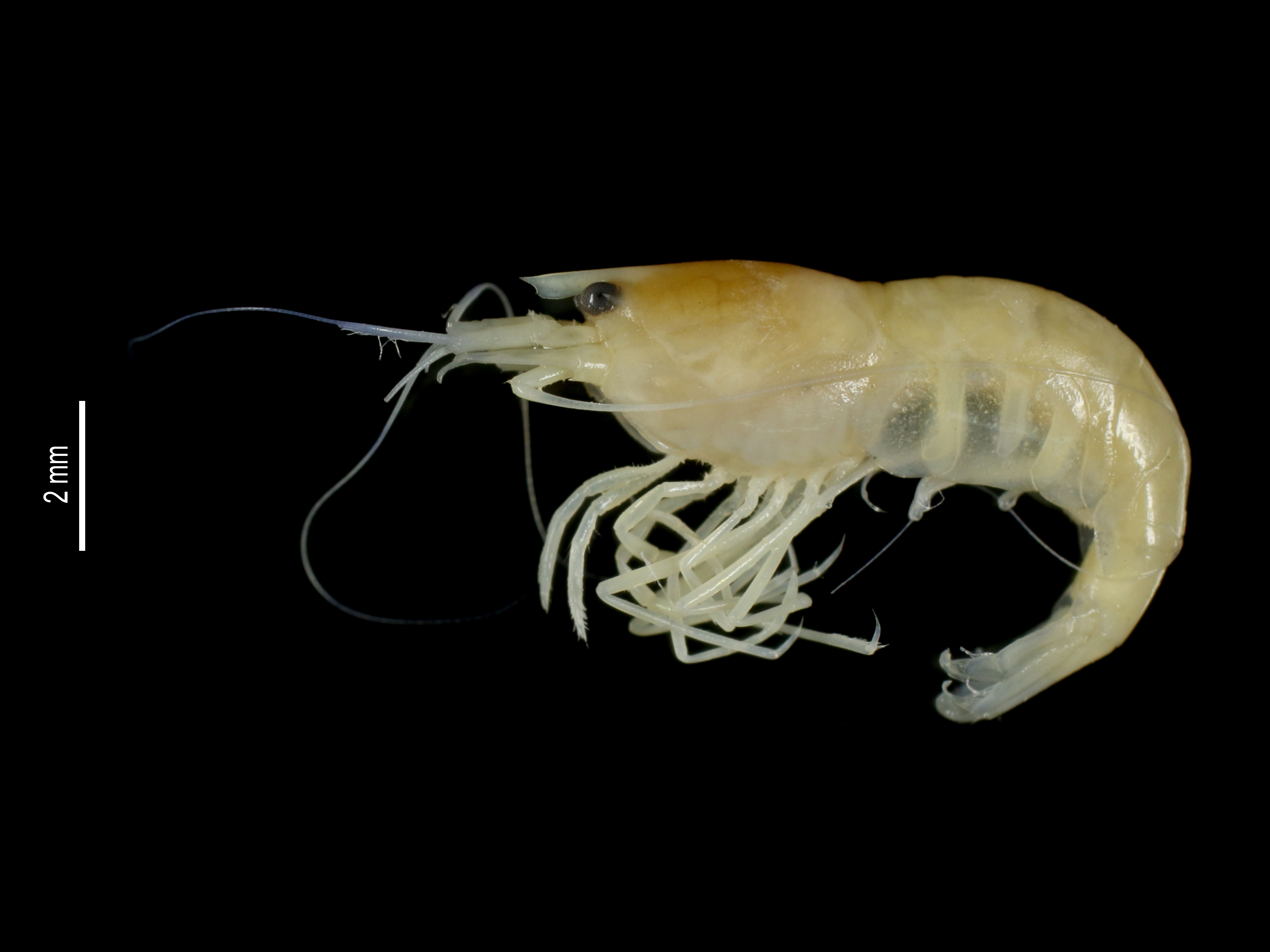
- Potamalpheops johnsoni

Scientific classification
- Kingdom: Animalia
- Phylum: Arthropoda
- Clade: Pancrustacea
- Class: Malacostraca
- Order: Decapoda
- Suborder: Pleocyemata
- Infraorder: Caridea
- Family: Alpheidae
- Genus: Potamalpheops; Powell, 1979

Type species
- Potamalpheops pylorus Powell, 1979

= Potamalpheops =

Genus of crustaceans

Potamalpheops is a genus of shrimp in the family Alpheidae. It was originally erected by Powell in 1979 to house species from Africa. Later, Horton H. Hobbs, Jr. realised that the troglobitic shrimp he had described in 1973 from Oaxaca, Mexico as Alpheopsis stygicola, also belonged to the genus, and in 1991, A. J. Bruce described a new species from Australia, further expanding the genus' geographical range. It is now thought to represent a relict taxon from the Tethys Sea.

The following species are currently accepted as valid:

- Potamalpheops amnicus Yeo & Ng, 1997
- Potamalpheops darwiniensis Bruce, 1993
- Potamalpheops galle Anker, 2005
- Potamalpheops hanleyi Bruce, 1991
- Potamalpheops haugi (Coutière, 1906)
- Potamalpheops johnsoni Anker, 2003
- Potamalpheops kisi Marin, 2021
- Potamalpheops miyai Yeo & Ng, 1997
- Potamalpheops monodi (Sollaud, 1932)
- Potamalpheops nazgul Christodoulou, Iliffe & De Grave, 2019
- Potamalpheops palawensis Cai & Anker, 2004
- Potamalpheops pininsulae Bruce & Iliffe, 1992
- Potamalpheops pylorus Powell, 1979
- Potamalpheops stygicola (Hobbs, 1973)
- Potamalpheops tigger Yeo & Ng, 1997
- Potamalpheops tyrymembe Soledade, Santos & Almeida, 2014
- Potamalpheops yamakawai Yamashita, Komai & Koreeda, 2024

An undescribed species from Taiwan thought to belong to this genus, dubbed the "purple zebra shrimp" or "purple crystal shrimp", is sometimes kept in aquaria. Its mitogenome was studied in 2024. The following cladogram is based on this 2024 study:

- Alpheidae
  - - - - - - - - Alpheus distinguendus
                - Alpheus hoplocheles
              - Alpheus bellulus
            - Alpheus brevicristatus
          - Alpheus inopinatus
        - - Potamalpheops sp.
          - Alpheus japonicus
      - Alpheus randalli
    - Leptalpheus forceps
  - Synalpheus microneptunus
- Palaemonidae
  - - Macrobrachium
    - Gnathophyllum
  - Palaemon
