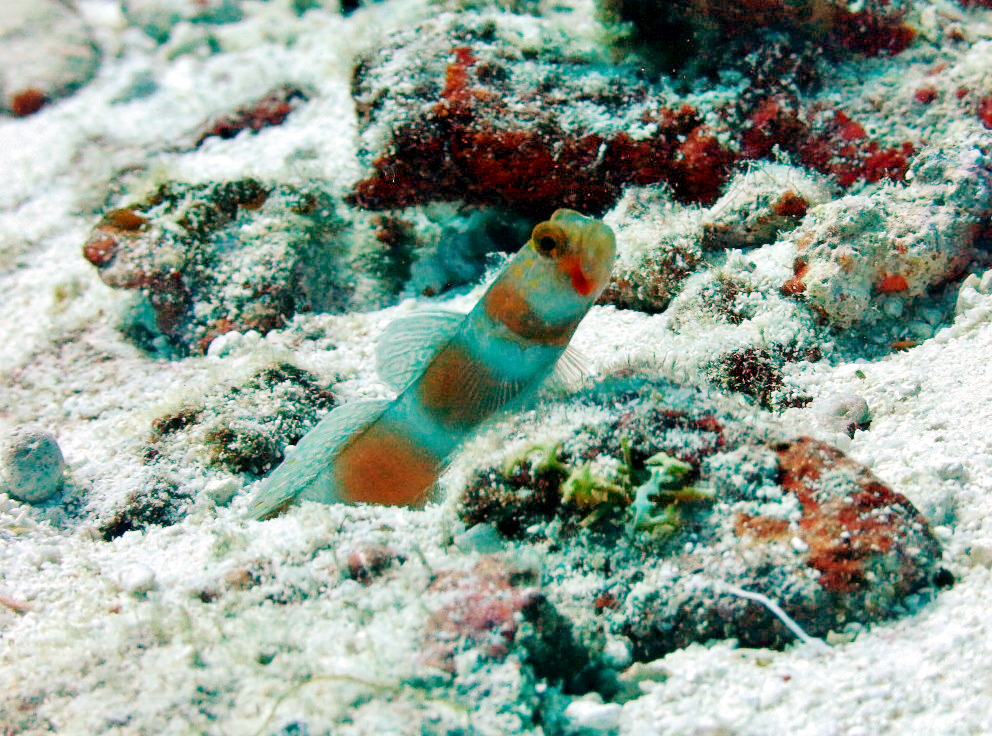
- Amblyeleotris aurora in the Maldives (Baa Atoll)

Scientific classification
- Domain: Eukaryota
- Kingdom: Animalia
- Phylum: Chordata
- Class: Actinopterygii
- Order: Gobiiformes
- Family: Gobiidae
- Genus: Amblyeleotris
- Species: A. aurora

Binomial name
- Amblyeleotris aurora (Polunin & Lubbock, 1977)

Synonyms
- Cryptocentrus aurora Polunin & Lubbock, 1977

= Pinkbar goby =

Species of fish

Amblyeleotris aurora, the pinkbar goby, is a species of goby native to reefs of the western Indian Ocean at depths of from 5 to 40 metres (16 to 131 ft) though usually not deeper than 10 metres (33 ft). It is commensal with the shrimp Alpheus randalli. This species can reach a length of 11 centimetres (4.3 in) TL. It can also be found in the aquarium trade.
