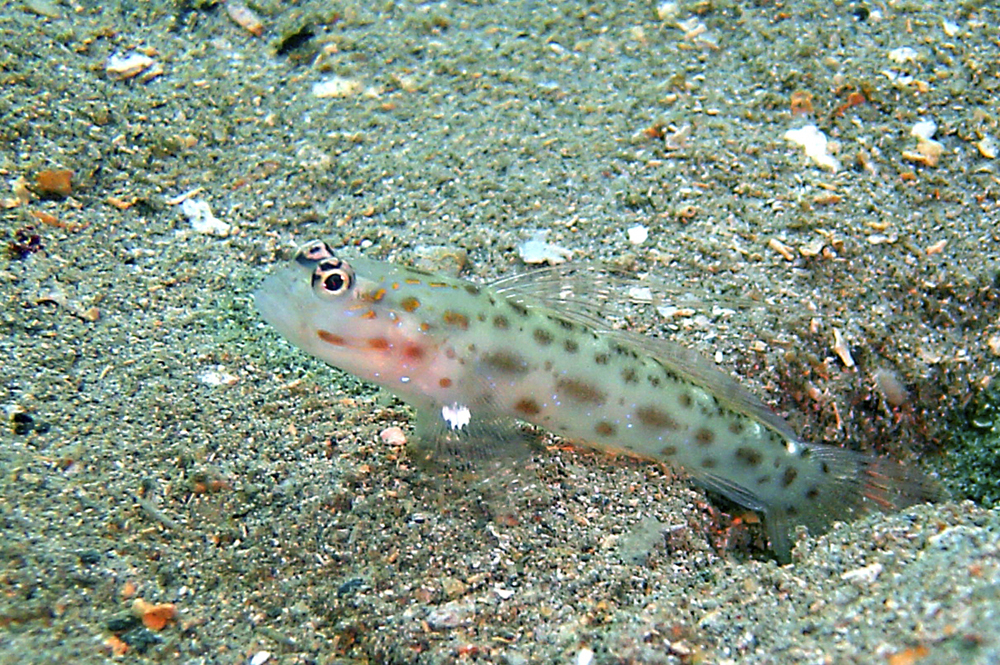

Conservation status
- Least Concern (IUCN 3.1)

Scientific classification
- Kingdom: Animalia
- Phylum: Chordata
- Class: Actinopterygii
- Order: Gobiiformes
- Family: Gobiidae
- Genus: Ctenogobiops
- Species: C. crocineus

Binomial name
- Ctenogobiops crocineus J. L. B. Smith, 1959

= Ctenogobiops crocineus =

Species of fish

Ctenogobiops tangaroai, the silver-spotted shrimp-goby, is a species of bony fish of the family Gobiidae, native to the reefs which is widespread in the Indo-West Pacific, from the Red Sea and Western Indian Ocean through northern Australia and Taiwan, southern Japan and Fiji. It occurs in fine-grained sand patches at depths of from 4 to 40 metres (13 to 131 ft) where it is commensal with alpheid shrimps, with a fish and shrimp sharing a burrow. This species can reach a length of 6 centimetres (2.4 in) TL. It can also be found in the aquarium trade. It is pale in colour marked with four rows of brown spots or dashes along its flanks, three diagonal rows of short, dark stripes on the posterior of its head with larger dark spots on the lower flanks which are frequently surrounded by smaller blue spots and there is a small white stripe above the pectoral fin base with a longer white streak on the pectoral fin. It is the type species of the genus Ctenogobiops.
