= Salmoneus degravei =

Scientific classification
- Kingdom: Animalia
- Phylum: Arthropoda
- Class: Malacostraca
- Order: Decapoda
- Suborder: Pleocyemata
- Infraorder: Caridea
- Family: Alpheidae
- Genus: Salmoneus
- Species: S. degravei

Binomial name
- Salmoneus degravei Anker, 2010

Species of pistol shrimp

Salmoneus degravei is a species of pistol shrimp. It is known from the Caribbean Sea in the waters of Panama, Colombia, Venezuela, and Tobago.

== Description ==
Salmoneus degravei is whitish and semitransparent, except for its gonads and embryos, which are yellow. Its carapace is covered in tiny pits and, sparsely, with setae. Its rostrum is acutely tipped and shaped like a broad triangle with shallowly concave margins. Its eyes are hidden by the carapace when viewed directly from the top and the sides. The chelipeds are almost equally sized but differ noticeably in shape. The smaller chela is shorter and stouter than the larger one (fingers ~50% as long as the palm rather than ~80%), exhibits stronger curvature, and has a strong tooth on the dactylus and some small teeth on the pollex instead of small, rounded teeth on both fingers.

== Taxonomy ==
Salmoneus degravei was described in 2010 by Arthur Anker. It is named for carcinologist Sammy De Grave.
