= Batella muscosa =

Scientific classification
- Kingdom: Animalia
- Phylum: Arthropoda
- Class: Insecta
- Order: Lepidoptera
- Family: Erebidae
- Subfamily: Lymantriinae
- Genus: Batella Dall'Asta, 1981
- Species: B. muscosa

Binomial name
- Batella muscosa (Holland, 1893)

Synonyms
- Liparis muscosa Holland, 1893; Dasychira muscosa

Species of moth

Batella muscosa is a species in the moth genus Batella in the subfamily Lymantriinae. The genus was erected by Ugo Dall'Asta in 1981, but the name is preoccupied by the crustacean genus Batella Holthuis, 1955. The species was first described by William Jacob Holland in 1893. It is found in western Africa.
