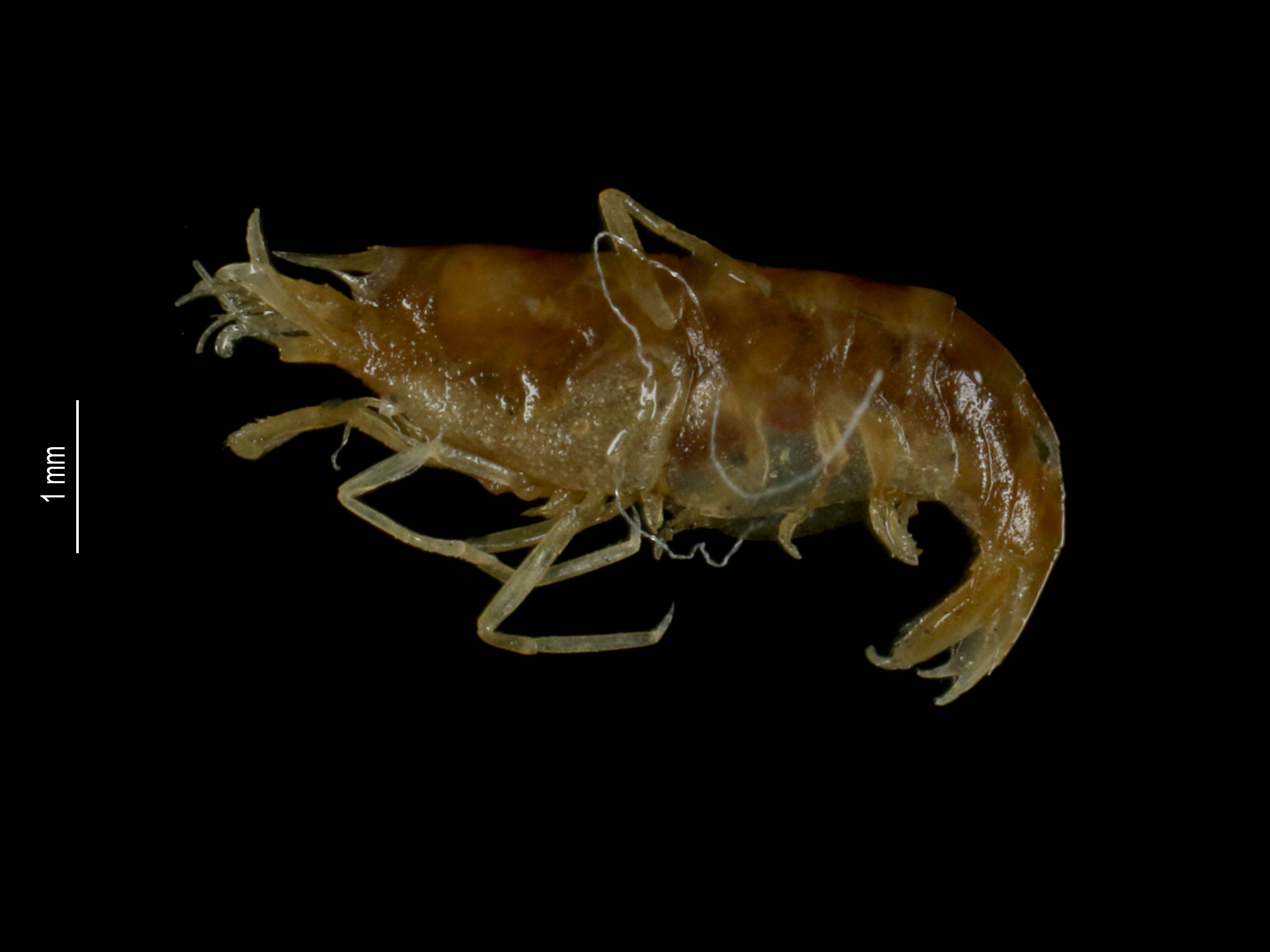

Scientific classification
- Kingdom: Animalia
- Phylum: Arthropoda
- Clade: Pancrustacea
- Class: Malacostraca
- Order: Decapoda
- Suborder: Pleocyemata
- Infraorder: Caridea
- Family: Alpheidae
- Genus: Athanas
- Species: A. areteformis

Binomial name
- Athanas areteformis Coutière, 1903

Synonyms
- Athanas crosslandi Tattersall, 1921; Athanas dubius Banner, 1956; Athanas erythraeus Ramadan, 1936; Athanas naifaroensis Coutière, 1903

= Athanas areteformis =

Species of crustacean

Athanas areteformis is a species of small alpheid shrimp from the Indo-West Pacific.

== Taxonomy ==
Athanas areteformis belongs to the genus Athanas of the snapping shrimp family Alpheidae. It was first described in 1903 by the French carcinologist Henri Coutière.

== Distribution ==
Athanas areteformis has an Indo-West Pacific distribution. They can be found in South Africa, the Red Sea, Réunion, Maldives, the Philippines, Saipan, Australia, the Marshall Islands, Fiji, Tonga, Samoa, and the Society Islands.

== Ecology ==
They inhabit intertidal and subtidal areas of coral reefs, at depths of 2 to 28 m (7 to 92 ft). They can sometimes be found living among the spines of flower urchins (Toxopneustes pileolus), burrowing urchins (Echinometra mathaei), and collector urchins (Tripneustes gratilla).
