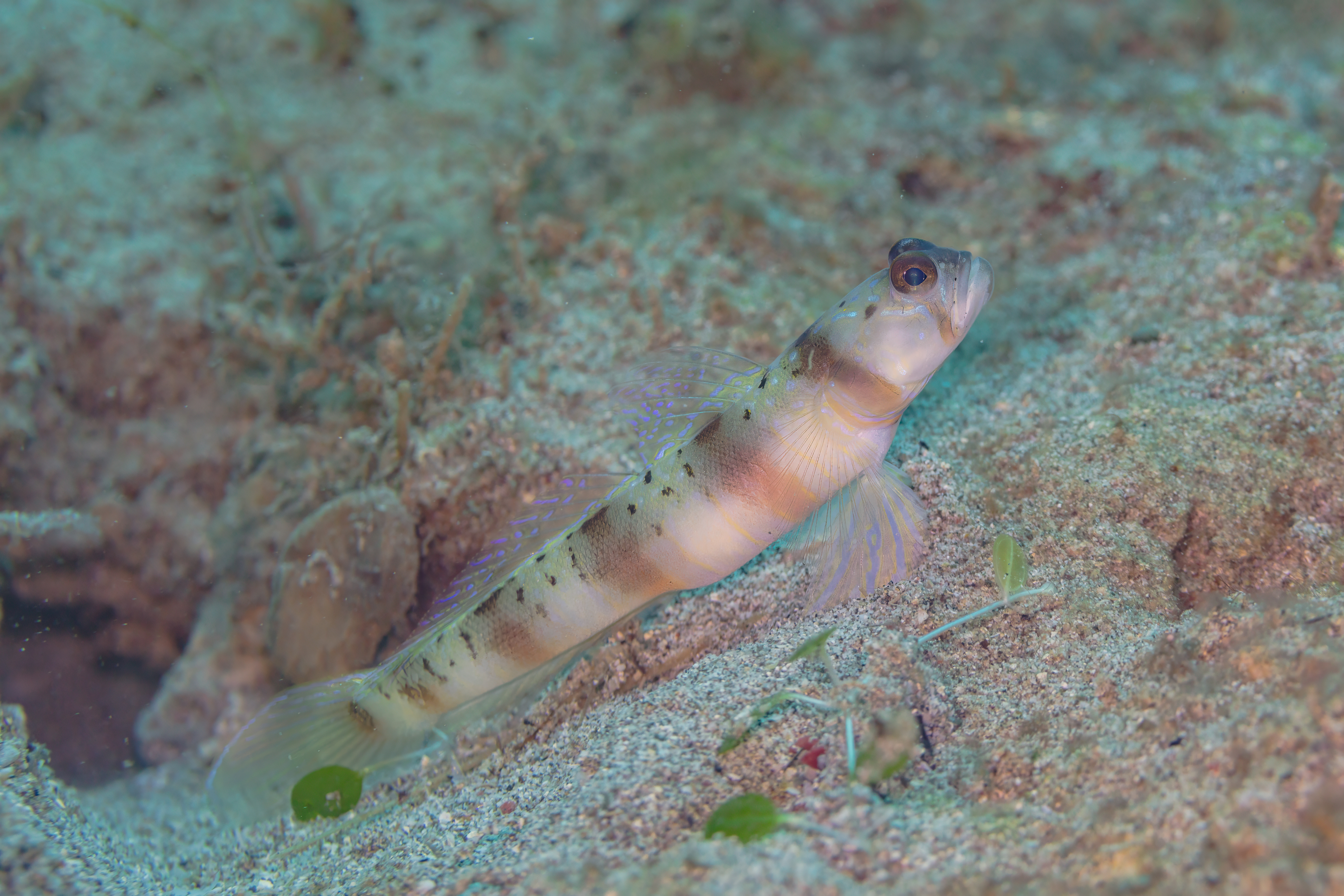
- Near Anilao, Philippines

Conservation status
- Least Concern (IUCN 3.1)

Scientific classification
- Kingdom: Animalia
- Phylum: Chordata
- Class: Actinopterygii
- Order: Gobiiformes
- Family: Gobiidae
- Genus: Amblyeleotris
- Species: A. rubrimarginata

Binomial name
- Amblyeleotris rubrimarginata Mohlmann & J. E. Randall, 2002

= Amblyeleotris rubrimarginata =

Species of fish

Amblyeleotris rubrimarginata, the redmargin shrimpgoby, is a species of goby. It is found on reefs or in sea grass beds in the western Pacific from New Caledonia to the Great Barrier Reef and around New Guinea, Indonesia, Malaysia and the Philippines. It can be found at depths of from 3 to 26 metres (10 to 85 ft). As with other Amblyeleotris species, it has a symbiotic relationship with alpheid shrimps, one or a pair of gobies sharing a burrow with a pair of shrimps.

== Description ==
This is a fairly elongated goby up to 8 cm (3 in) standard length. The background colour is whitish marked with five vertical brown or orange bars. It is most readily distinguished from its congeners by a row of red spots along the margin of both dorsal fins and the upper part of the caudal fin and also by a prominent black spot just above and behind the eye.
