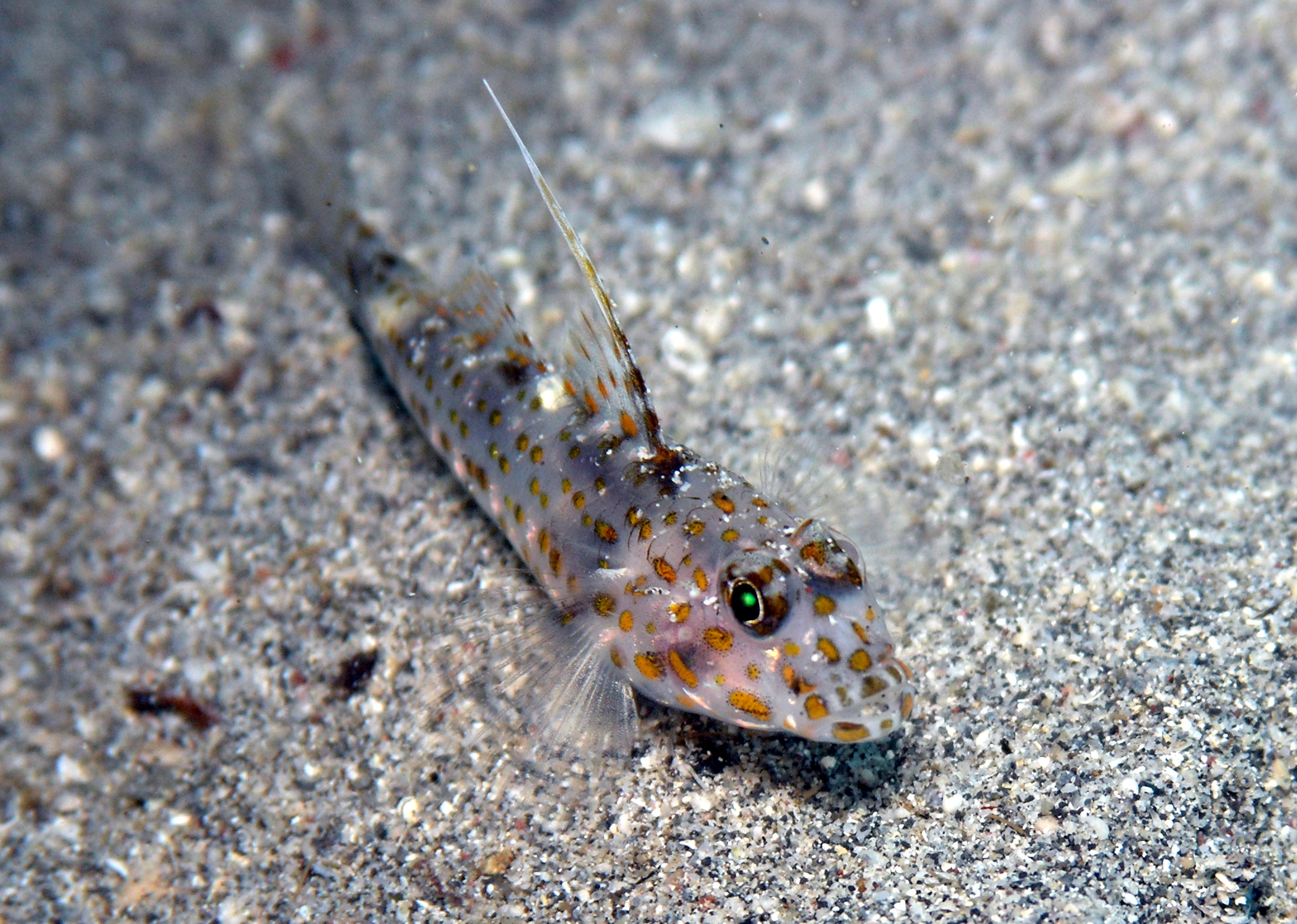

Scientific classification
- Kingdom: Animalia
- Phylum: Chordata
- Class: Actinopterygii
- Order: Gobiiformes
- Family: Gobiidae
- Genus: Ctenogobiops
- Species: C. tangaroai

Binomial name
- Ctenogobiops tangaroai Lubbock & Polunin, 1977

= Tangaroan shrimp-goby =

Species of fish

Ctenogobiops tangaroai, the Tangaroan shrimp-goby, is a species of goby of the family Gobiidae, native to the reefs of the Pacific Ocean where it can be found in fine-grained sand patches at depths of from 4 to 40 metres (13 to 131 ft). This species is commensal with alpheid shrimps, with a fish and shrimp sharing a burrow. This species can reach a length of 6 centimetres (2.4 in) TL. It can also be found in the aquarium trade.
