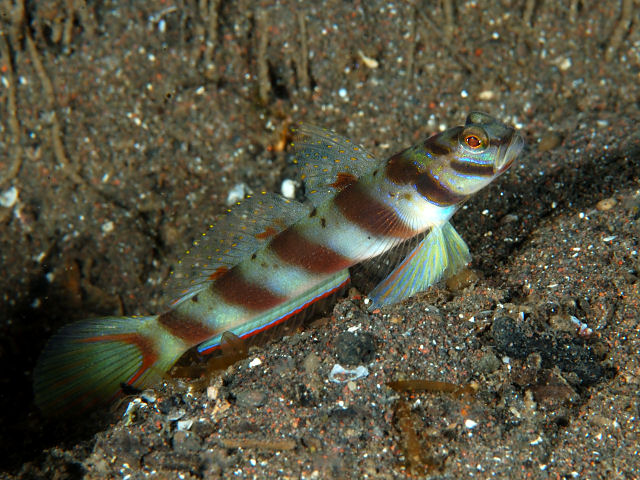

Conservation status
- Least Concern (IUCN 3.1)

Scientific classification
- Kingdom: Animalia
- Phylum: Chordata
- Class: Actinopterygii
- Order: Gobiiformes
- Family: Gobiidae
- Genus: Amblyeleotris
- Species: A. diagonalis

Binomial name
- Amblyeleotris diagonalis Polunin & Lubbock, 1979

= Amblyeleotris diagonalis =

Species of fish

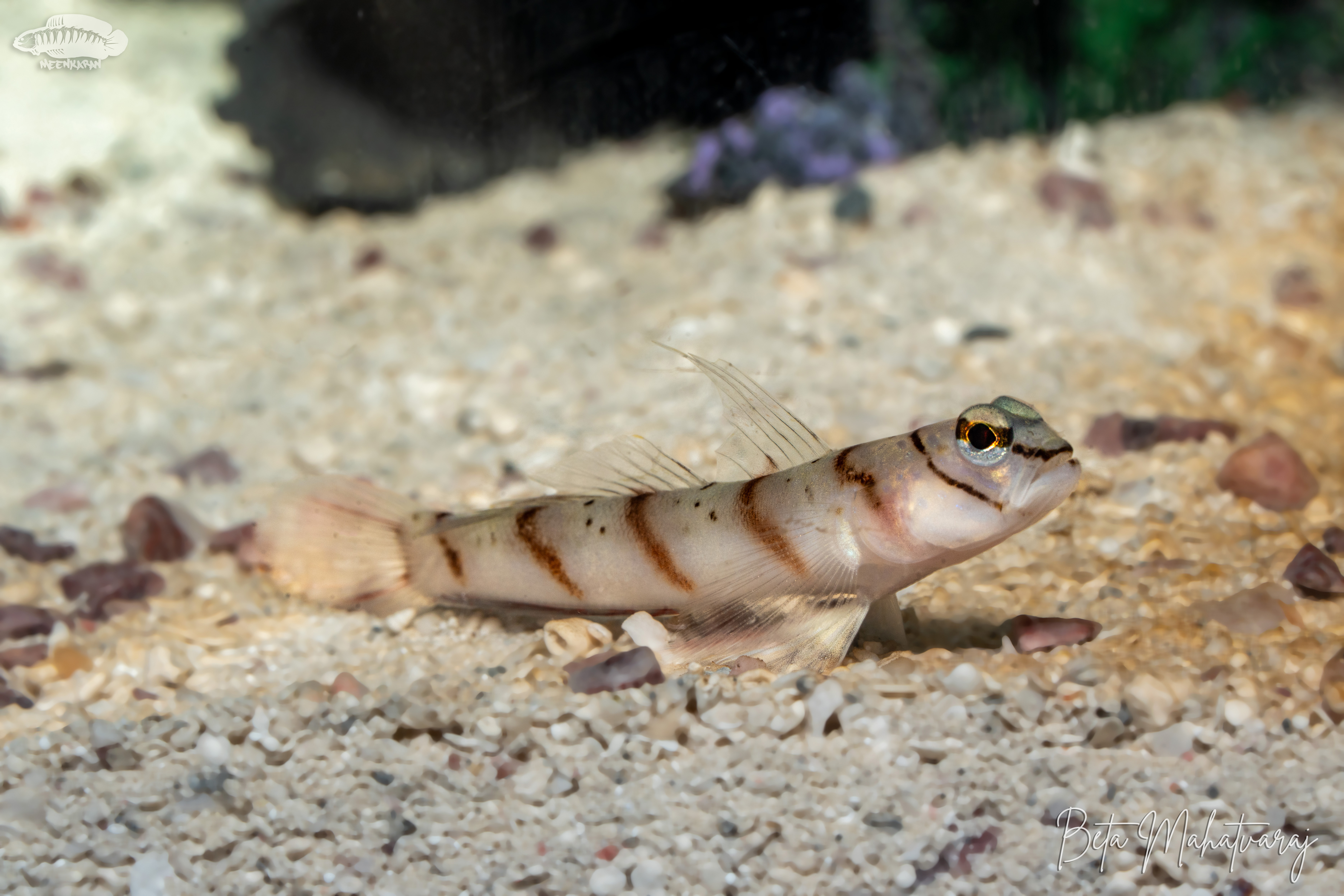

Amblyeleotris diagonalis, the diagonal shrimpgoby, is a species of goby. It is native to the Indian Ocean and the western Pacific Ocean where it can be found on reefs at depths of from 6 to 40 metres (20 to 131 ft). Amblyeleotris diagonalis is commensal with alpheid shrimps.

== Description ==
Amblyeleotris diagonalis can reach a standard length of 11 centimetres (4.3 in).
