= Automate branchialis =

Scientific classification
- Kingdom: Animalia
- Phylum: Arthropoda
- Class: Malacostraca
- Order: Decapoda
- Suborder: Pleocyemata
- Infraorder: Caridea
- Family: Alpheidae
- Genus: Automate
- Species: A. branchialis

Binomial name
- Automate branchialis Holthuis & Gottlieb, 1958

Species of crustacean

Automate branchialis is a species of pistol shrimp from the family Alpheidae which was thought to be a Lessepsian migrant, i.e. a species which had colonised the Mediterranean from the Red Sea via the Suez Canal. This was because before its description in 1958 all the species of the genus Automate were found in the Indo-Pacific region. A. branchialis has not been recorded in the Indo-Pacific region and has been found to be widespread in the Mediterranean so it is now considered to be a Mediterranean endemic.

== Discovery and distribution ==
Automate branchialis was originally described from specimens collected by Holthuis & Gottlieb off the coast of Israel in the 1950s. At the time the pistol shrimps of the genus Automate were only known from the Indian and Pacific Oceans and although Holthuis & Gottlieb described their specimens as the new species Automate branchialis it was assumed that it had invaded the Mediterranean through the Suez Canal from the Red Sea by Lessepsian migration.

A. branchialis was subsequently collected from a number of locations in the Mediterranean including Izmir Bay in Turkey, in the Greek Islands, Cyprus, from Manfredonia Bay in Italy, Malta, off Marseille, the Balearic Islands and off Spain. The widespread distribution of A. branchialis in the Mediterranean and the lack of any records in the Indo-Pacific region have led researchers to conclude that it is a previously overlooked endemic Mediterranean species. It was probably overlooked because of its small size and preferred deep water habitat; it is demersal with a depth range of 18–73 m.
