= Arete (crustacean) =

Scientific classification
- Kingdom: Animalia
- Phylum: Arthropoda
- Clade: Pancrustacea
- Class: Malacostraca
- Order: Decapoda
- Suborder: Pleocyemata
- Infraorder: Caridea
- Family: Alpheidae
- Genus: Arete; Stimpson, 1860

Type species
- Arete dorsalis Stimpson, 1860

Diversity
- 4 spp. (see text)

Genus of crustaceans

Arete is a genus of snapping shrimp of the family Alpheidae. This genus contains 4 species.

== Species ==
Valid species as of January 2025:

- Arete acanthocarpus (Miya & Miyake, 1968)
- Arete amboinensis De Man, 1910
- Arete dorsalis Stimpson, 1860
- Arete indicus Coutière, 1903
