= Athanas sydneyensis =

Scientific classification
- Kingdom: Animalia
- Phylum: Arthropoda
- Clade: Pancrustacea
- Class: Malacostraca
- Order: Decapoda
- Suborder: Pleocyemata
- Infraorder: Caridea
- Family: Alpheidae
- Genus: Athanas
- Species: A. sydneyensis

Binomial name
- Athanas sydneyensis Anker & Ahyong, 2007

Species of crustacean

Holotype site - Hawkesbury River (AM P62764,

Athanas sydneyensis is a species of small alpheid shrimp.

Athanas sydneyensis belongs to the genus Athanas of the snapping shrimp family Alpheidae. It was first described in 2007 by Arthur Anker and Shane Ahyong.

It has been found only midstream of the Hawkesbury River in the muddy-sand substrate at a depth of 10 metres.
