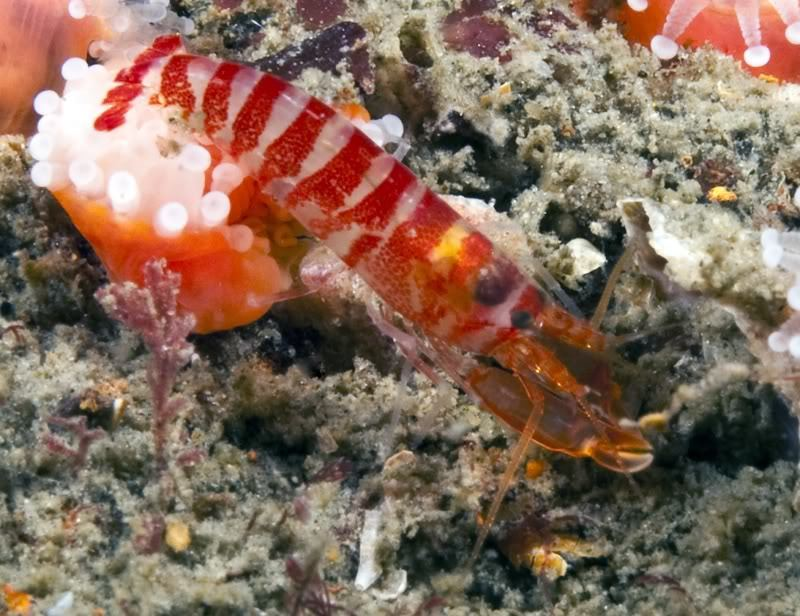
- Alpheopsis equidactylus

Scientific classification
- Kingdom: Animalia
- Phylum: Arthropoda
- Clade: Pancrustacea
- Class: Malacostraca
- Order: Decapoda
- Suborder: Pleocyemata
- Infraorder: Caridea
- Family: Alpheidae
- Genus: Alpheopsis; Coutière, 1897

Species
- See text

= Alpheopsis =

Genus of crustaceans

Alpheopsis is a genus of shrimp of the family Alpheidae. Several species of the genus have been known to share the same burrows with members of different species. They are inhabitants of the eastern Pacific Ocean.

== Species ==
The following species are recognised in the genus Alpheopsis:

- Alpheopsis aequalis Coutière, 1896
- Alpheopsis africana Holthuis, 1952
- Alpheopsis allanhancocki Wicksten, 1992
- Alpheopsis aristoteles Anker, 2017
- Alpheopsis azorica Anker, d'Udekem d'Acoz & Poddoubtchenko, 2005
- Alpheopsis balaeniceps Anker, 2015
- Alpheopsis biunguiculata Banner, 1953:
- Alpheopsis chalciope De Man, 1910
- Alpheopsis chilensis Coutière, 1896
- Alpheopsis cortesiana Wicksten & Hendrickx, 1986
- Alpheopsis diabolus Banner, 1956
- Alpheopsis equidactylus (Lockington, 1877)
- Alpheopsis garricki Yaldwyn, 1971
- Alpheopsis gotrina Anker, 2017
- Alpheopsis harperi Wicksten, 1984
- Alpheopsis idiocarpus Coutière, 1908
- Alpheopsis keiji Anker, 2017
- Alpheopsis labis Chace, 1972
- Alpheopsis paratrigona Anker, 2017
- Alpheopsis shearmii (Alcock & Anderson, 1899)
- Alpheopsis tetrarthri Banner, 1956
- Alpheopsis trigona (Rathbun, 1901)
- Alpheopsis trispinosa (Stimpson, 1860)
- Alpheopsis undicola Banner & Banner, 1973
- Alpheopsis vietnamensis Tiwari, 1964
- Alpheopsis yaldwyni Banner & Banner, 1973
