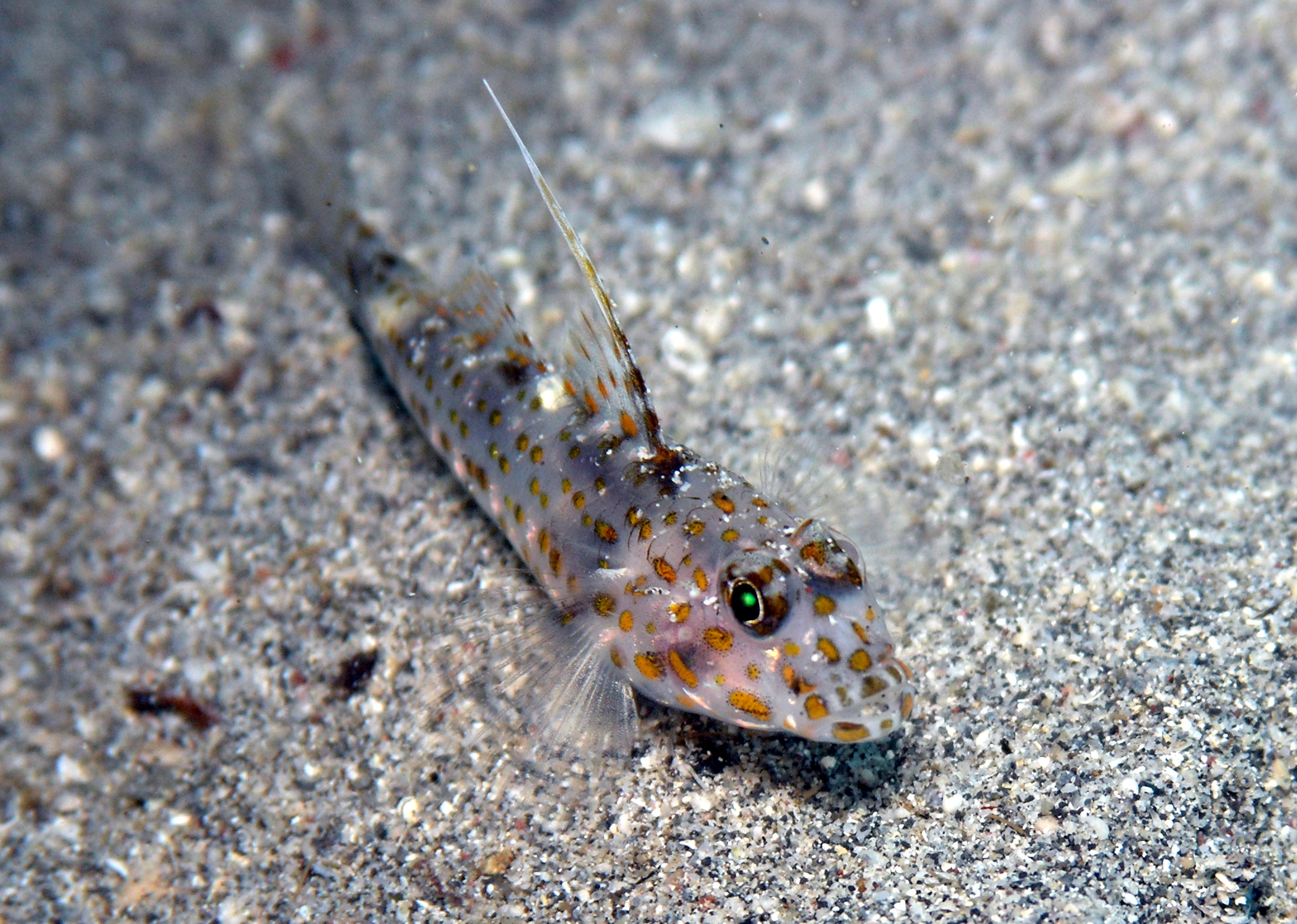
- Tangaroan shrimpgoby (C. tangaroai)

Scientific classification
- Kingdom: Animalia
- Phylum: Chordata
- Class: Actinopterygii
- Order: Gobiiformes
- Family: Gobiidae
- Subfamily: Gobiinae
- Genus: Ctenogobiops; J. L. B. Smith, 1959

Type species
- Ctenogobiops crocineus J. L. B. Smith, 1959

= Ctenogobiops =

Genus of fishes

Ctenogobiops is a genus of marine gobies native to the Indian and Pacific oceans.

They commonly live on sandy sea beds and are often found sharing burrows with small shrimp.

== Species ==
There are currently nine recognized species in this genus:

- Ctenogobiops aurocingulus (Herre, 1935) (Gold-streaked prawn-goby)
- Ctenogobiops crocineus J. L. B. Smith, 1959
- Ctenogobiops feroculus Lubbock & Polunin, 1977 (Sandy prawn-goby)
- Ctenogobiops formosa J. E. Randall, K. T. Shao & J. P. Chen, 2003
- Ctenogobiops maculosus (Fourmanoir, 1955) (Seychelles shrimpgoby)
- Ctenogobiops mitodes J. E. Randall, K. T. Shao & J. P. Chen, 2007
- Ctenogobiops pomastictus Lubbock & Polunin, 1977 (Gold-specked prawn-goby)
- Ctenogobiops tangaroai Lubbock & Polunin, 1977 (Tangaroa shrimpgoby)
- Ctenogobiops tongaensis J. E. Randall, K. T. Shao & J. P. Chen, 2003
