= Bannereus anomalus =

Scientific classification
- Kingdom: Animalia
- Phylum: Arthropoda
- Clade: Pancrustacea
- Class: Malacostraca
- Order: Decapoda
- Suborder: Pleocyemata
- Infraorder: Caridea
- Family: Alpheidae
- Genus: Bannereus
- Species: B. anomalus

Binomial name
- Bannereus anomalus Bruce, 1988

Genus of crustaceans

Bannereus anomalus is a species of shrimp in the family Alpheidae It lives in the Coral Sea at depths of 350 metres (1,150 ft), in association with hexactinellid sponges.
