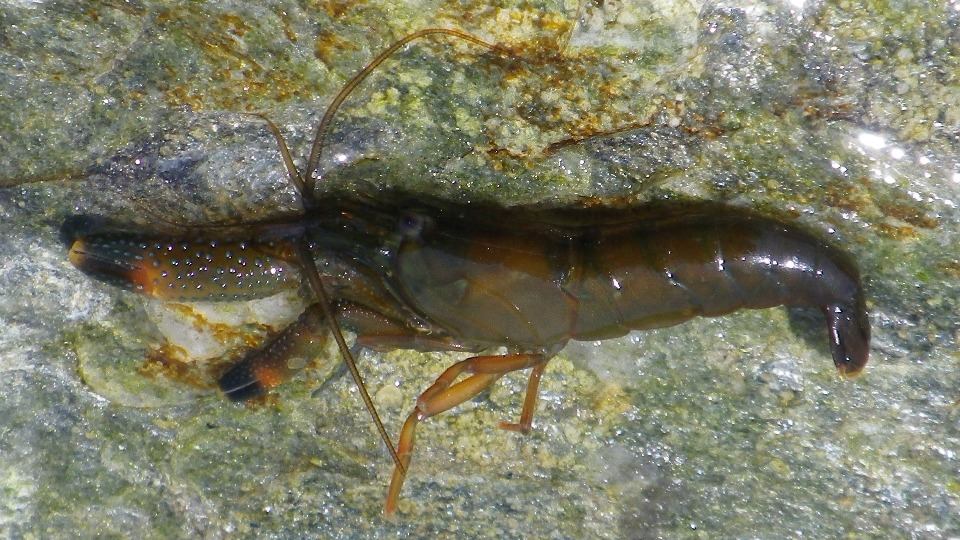
- Betaeus granulimanus

Scientific classification
- Kingdom: Animalia
- Phylum: Arthropoda
- Clade: Pancrustacea
- Class: Malacostraca
- Order: Decapoda
- Suborder: Pleocyemata
- Infraorder: Caridea
- Family: Alpheidae
- Genus: Betaeus; Dana, 1852

Species
- See text.

= Betaeus =

Genus of crustaceans

Betaeus is a genus of shrimp in the family Alpheidae, containing the following species:

- Betaeus australis Stimpson, 1860
- Betaeus emarginatus (H. Milne-Edwards, 1837)
- Betaeus ensenadensis Glassell, 1938
- Betaeus gelasinifer Nomura & Komai, 2000
- Betaeus gracilis Hart, 1964
- Betaeus granulimanus Yokoya, 1927
- Betaeus harfordi (Kingsley, 1878)
- Betaeus harrimani Rathbun, 1904
- Betaeus jucundus Barnard, 1947
- Betaeus lilianae Boschi, 1966
- Betaeus longidactylus Lockington, 1877
- Betaeus macginitieae Hart, 1964
- Betaeus pingi Yu, 1930
- Betaeus setosus Hart, 1964
- Betaeus truncatus Dana, 1852
