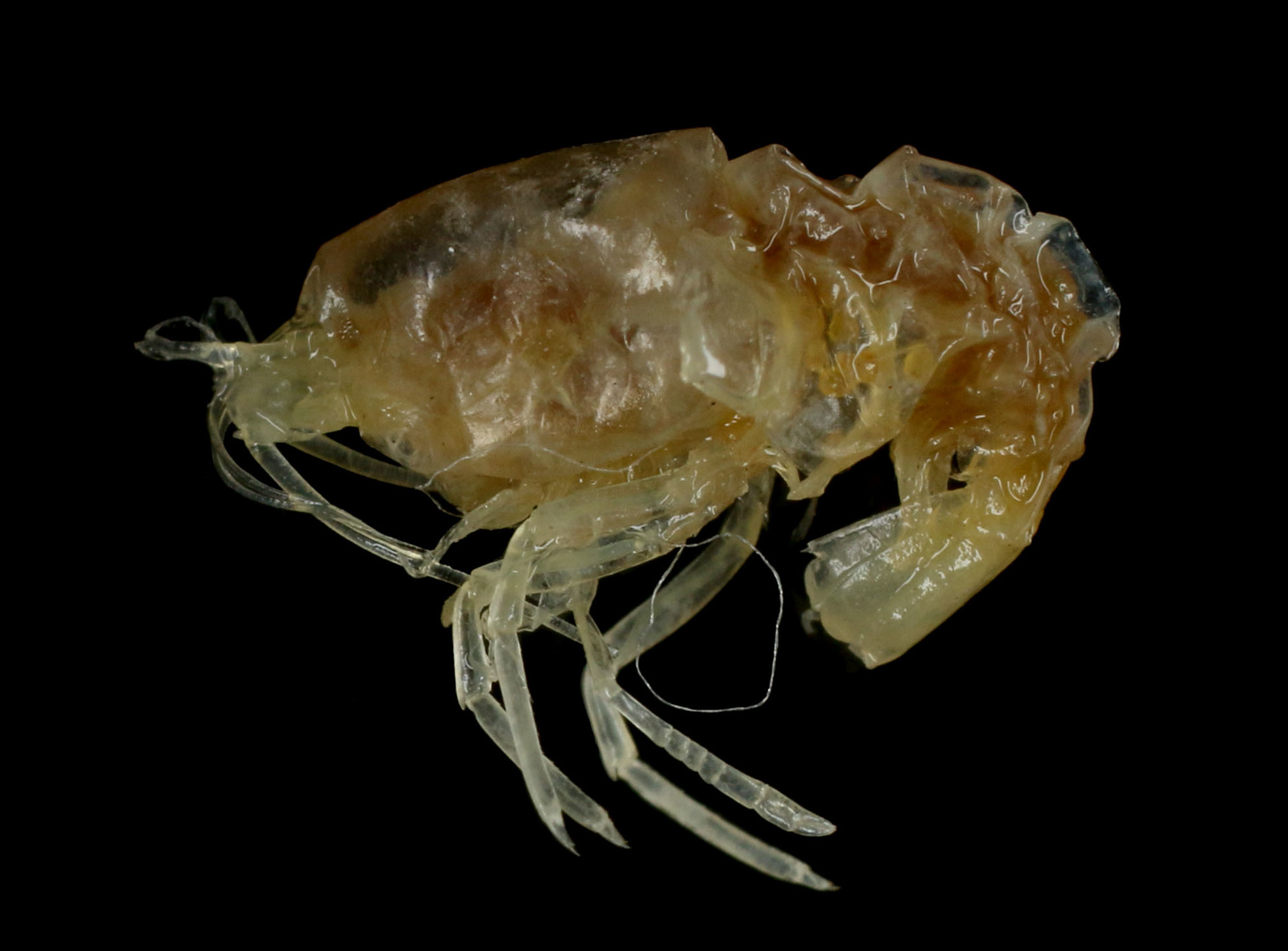
- Athanas granti

Scientific classification
- Kingdom: Animalia
- Phylum: Arthropoda
- Clade: Pancrustacea
- Class: Malacostraca
- Order: Decapoda
- Suborder: Pleocyemata
- Infraorder: Caridea
- Family: Alpheidae
- Genus: Athanas; Leach, 1814

= Athanas =

Genus of crustaceans

Athanas is a genus of shrimp of the family Alpheidae. These are small shrimp measuring 2 cm in length. Females have smaller chelae than males.

Some species, including A. djiboutensis, are called "bulldozer shrimp" because of the way that they push sand and small stones about.

== Species ==
The following species are recognised in the genus Athanas:

- Athanas ahyongi Anker & Komai, 2010
- Athanas alpheusophilus Marin, 2017
- Athanas amazone Holthuis, 1951
- Athanas anatidactylus Anker & Marin, 2007
- Athanas areteformis Coutière, 1903
- Athanas daviei Anker, 2011
- Athanas dentirostris Anker, Jeng & Chan, 2001
- Athanas dimorphus Ortmann, 1894
- Athanas djiboutensis Coutière, 1897
- Athanas esakii Kubo, 1940
- Athanas exilis Komai & Henmi, 2023
- Athanas gracilipes Banner & Banner, 1978
- Athanas gracilis Boone, 1935
- Athanas granti Coutière, 1908
- Athanas grimaldii Coutière, 1911
- Athanas hasswelli Coutière, 1908
- Athanas hongkongensis Bruce, 1990
- Athanas iranicus Anker, Naderloo & Marin, 2010
- Athanas ivoiriensis Anker & Ahyong, 2007
- Athanas japonicus Kubo, 1936
- Athanas jedanensis De Man, 1910
- Athanas locincertus Banner & Banner, 1973
- Athanas manticolus Duris & Anker, 2014
- Athanas marshallensis Chace, 1955
- Athanas mendax Ahyong, 2015
- Athanas minikoensis Coutière, 1903
- Athanas naga Banner & Banner, 1966
- Athanas nitescens (Leach, 1814)
- Athanas nouvelae Holthuis, 1951
- Athanas ohsimai Yokoya, 1936
- Athanas orientalis Pearson, 1905
- Athanas ornithorhynchus Banner & Banner, 1973
- Athanas parvus De Man, 1910
- Athanas philippei Anker & Ďuriš, 2022
- Athanas phyllocheles Banner & Banner, 1983
- Athanas polymorphus Kemp, 1915
- Athanas rhothionastes Banner & Banner, 1960
- Athanas shawnsmithi Anker, 2011
- Athanas squillophilus Hayashi, 2002
- Athanas stebbingii De Man, 1920
- Athanas sydneyensis Anker & Ahyong, 2007
- Athanas tenuipes De Man, 1910
