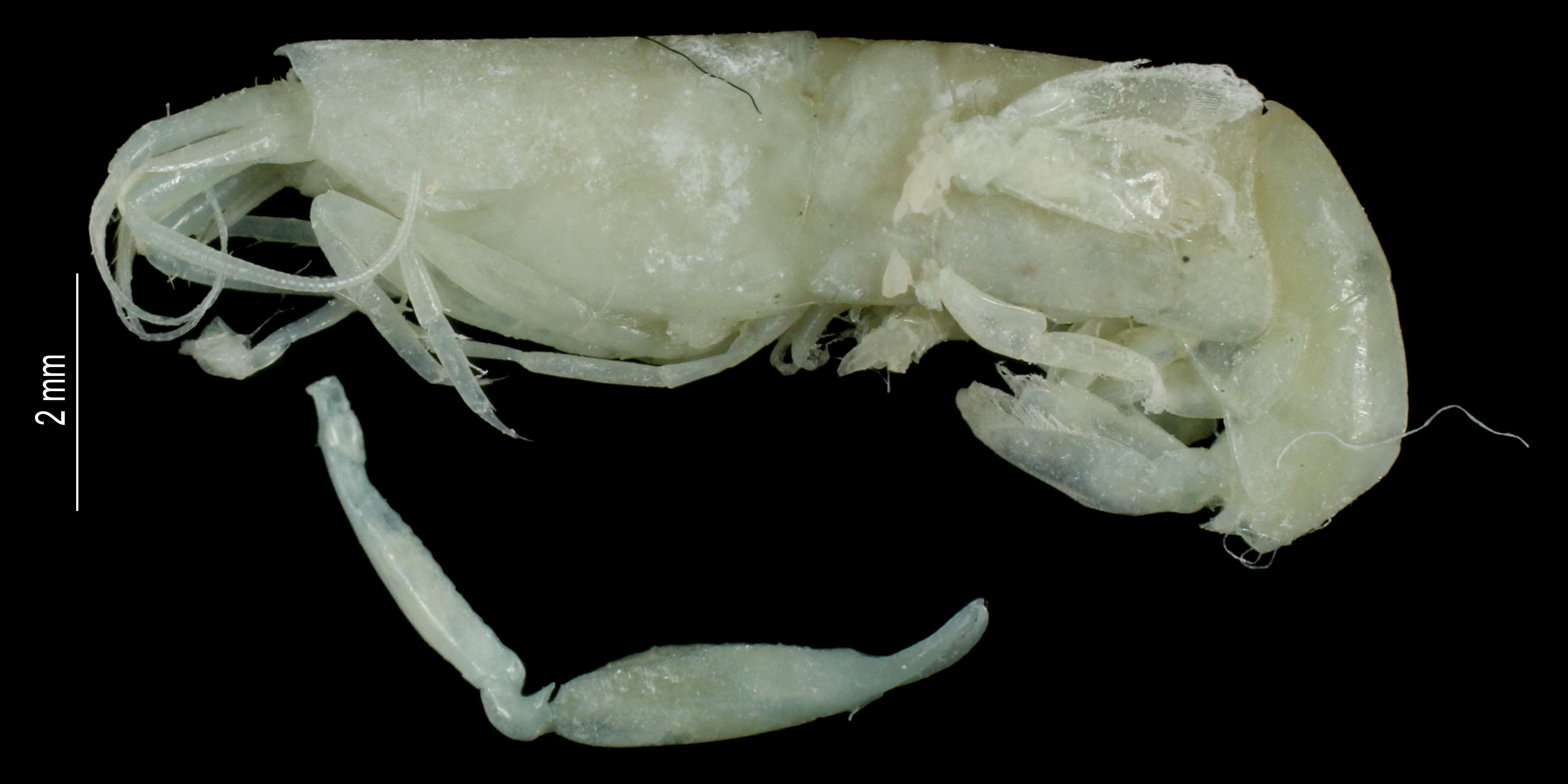
- Leptalpheus pierrenoeli

Scientific classification
- Kingdom: Animalia
- Phylum: Arthropoda
- Clade: Pancrustacea
- Class: Malacostraca
- Order: Decapoda
- Suborder: Pleocyemata
- Infraorder: Caridea
- Family: Alpheidae
- Genus: Leptalpheus; Williams, 1965

= Leptalpheus =

Genus of crustaceans

Leptalpheus is a genus of shrimp in the family Alpheidae, containing the following species:

- Leptalpheus axianassae Dworschak & VR Coelho, 1999
- Leptalpheus azuero Anker, 2011
- Leptalpheus bicristatus Anker, 2011
- Leptalpheus canterakintzi Anker & Lazarus, 2015
- Leptalpheus corderoae Salgado-Barrágan, Ayón-Parente & Hendrickx, 2014
- Leptalpheus denticulatus Anker & Marin, 2009
- Leptalpheus dworschaki Anker & Marin, 2009
- Leptalpheus felderi Anker, Vera Caripe & Lira, 2006
- Leptalpheus forceps Williams, 1965
- Leptalpheus hendrickxi Anker, 2011
- Leptalpheus lirai Vera Caripe, Pereda & Anker, 2021
- Leptalpheus marginalis Anker, 2011
- Leptalpheus melendezensis Salgado-Barragán, Ayón-Parente & Zamora-Tavares, 2017
- Leptalpheus mexicanus Ríos & Carvacho, 1983
- Leptalpheus pacificus Banner & Banner, 1975
- Leptalpheus penicillatus Anker, 2011
- Leptalpheus pereirai Anker & Vera Caripe, 2016
- Leptalpheus pierrenoeli Anker, 2008
