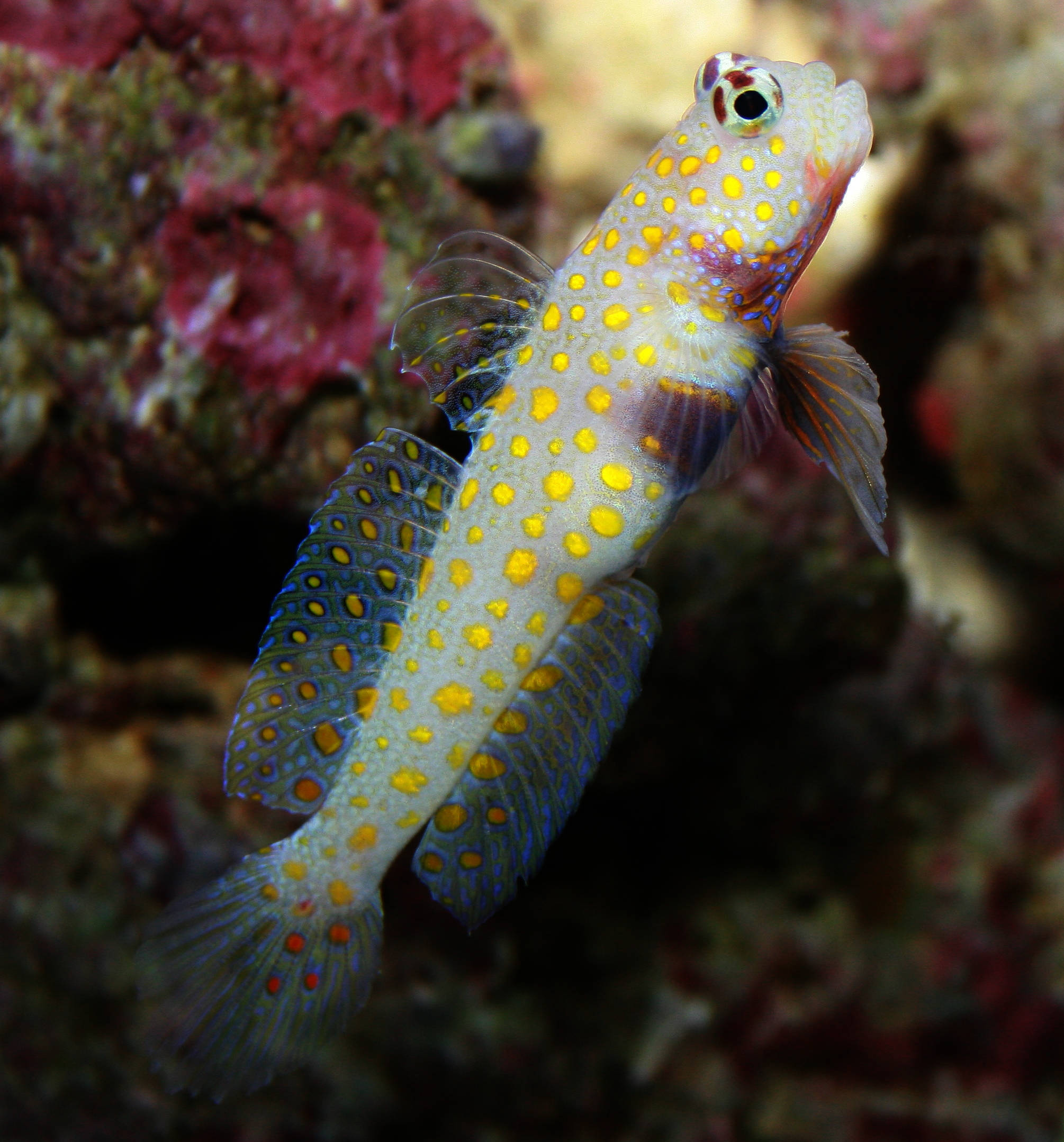

Scientific classification
- Kingdom: Animalia
- Phylum: Chordata
- Class: Actinopterygii
- Order: Gobiiformes
- Family: Gobiidae
- Genus: Amblyeleotris
- Species: A. guttata

Binomial name
- Amblyeleotris guttata (Fowler, 1938)

Synonyms
- Pteroculiops guttatus Fowler, 1938

= Spotted prawn goby =

Species of fish

Amblyeleotris guttata, the spotted prawn-goby, is a species of goby native to reefs of the Western Pacific Ocean, that includes the Philippines to Tonga, north to the Ryukyu Islands, south to Australia.

This species can reach a length of 11 centimetres (4.3 in) SL. It can also be found in the aquarium trade.
