= Bannereus =

Scientific classification
- Kingdom: Animalia
- Phylum: Arthropoda
- Clade: Pancrustacea
- Class: Malacostraca
- Order: Decapoda
- Suborder: Pleocyemata
- Infraorder: Caridea
- Family: Alpheidae
- Genus: Bannereus; Bruce, 1988

Genus of crustaceans

Bannereus is a genus of shrimp in the family Alpheidae.

== Species ==
There are two species recognised in the genus Bannereus:

- Bannereus anomalus Bruce, 1988
- Bannereus chani Anker & Pachelle, 2020
