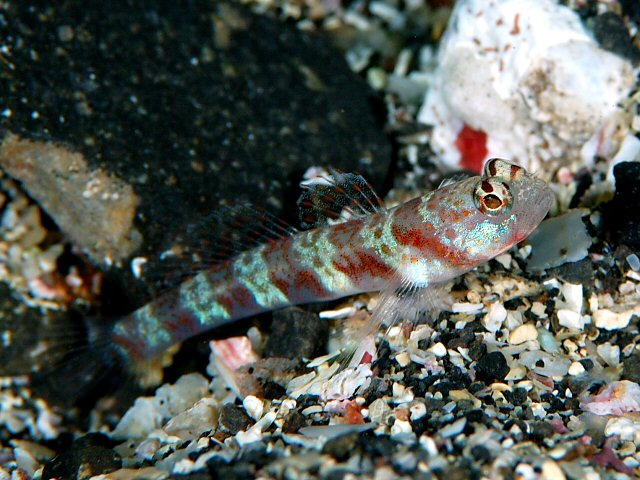

Conservation status
- Least Concern (IUCN 3.1)

Scientific classification
- Kingdom: Animalia
- Phylum: Chordata
- Class: Actinopterygii
- Order: Gobiiformes
- Family: Gobiidae
- Genus: Amblyeleotris
- Species: A. periophthalma

Binomial name
- Amblyeleotris periophthalma (Bleeker, 1853)

Synonyms
- Eleotris periophthalmus Bleeker, 1853; Amblyeleotris periophthalmus (Bleeker, 1853); Cryptocentrops exilis J. L. B. Smith, 1958; Amblyeleotris maculata Yanagisawa, 1976

= Amblyeleotris periophthalma =

Species of fish

Amblyeleotris periophthalma, the broad-banded shrimp goby or the periophthalma shrimp goby, is a marine benthic species of goby native to reef environments of the Indo-West Pacific, Red Sea included.

== Description ==
A. periophthalma is a small fish which can be up to 8 centimetres (3.1 in). Its body is lengthened and cylindrical. The background coloration is whitish and banded with large brown stripes whose color intensity varies from an individual to another. A multitude of small brownish dots are distributed mainly on the superior part of the body. Eyes are round and prominent. The mouth is big and in the shape of an inverted "U".

== Habitat ==
A. periophthalma can be found on sandy substrates in lagoons or on external reef slopes at depths of from 3 to 35 metres (9.8 to 114.8 ft), though mostly between 10 and 20 m (33 and 66 ft).

== Behaviour ==
A. periophthalma lives in symbiosis with alpheid shrimps in burrows. The shrimps dig and maintain the burrows which are the dens for both animals. The goby is like a watchman that warns in case of potential danger which benefits the shrimp because it has poor vision.

== Feeding ==
A. periophthalma has a carnivorous diet and usually eats small crustaceans or small fishes passing close to its burrow.
