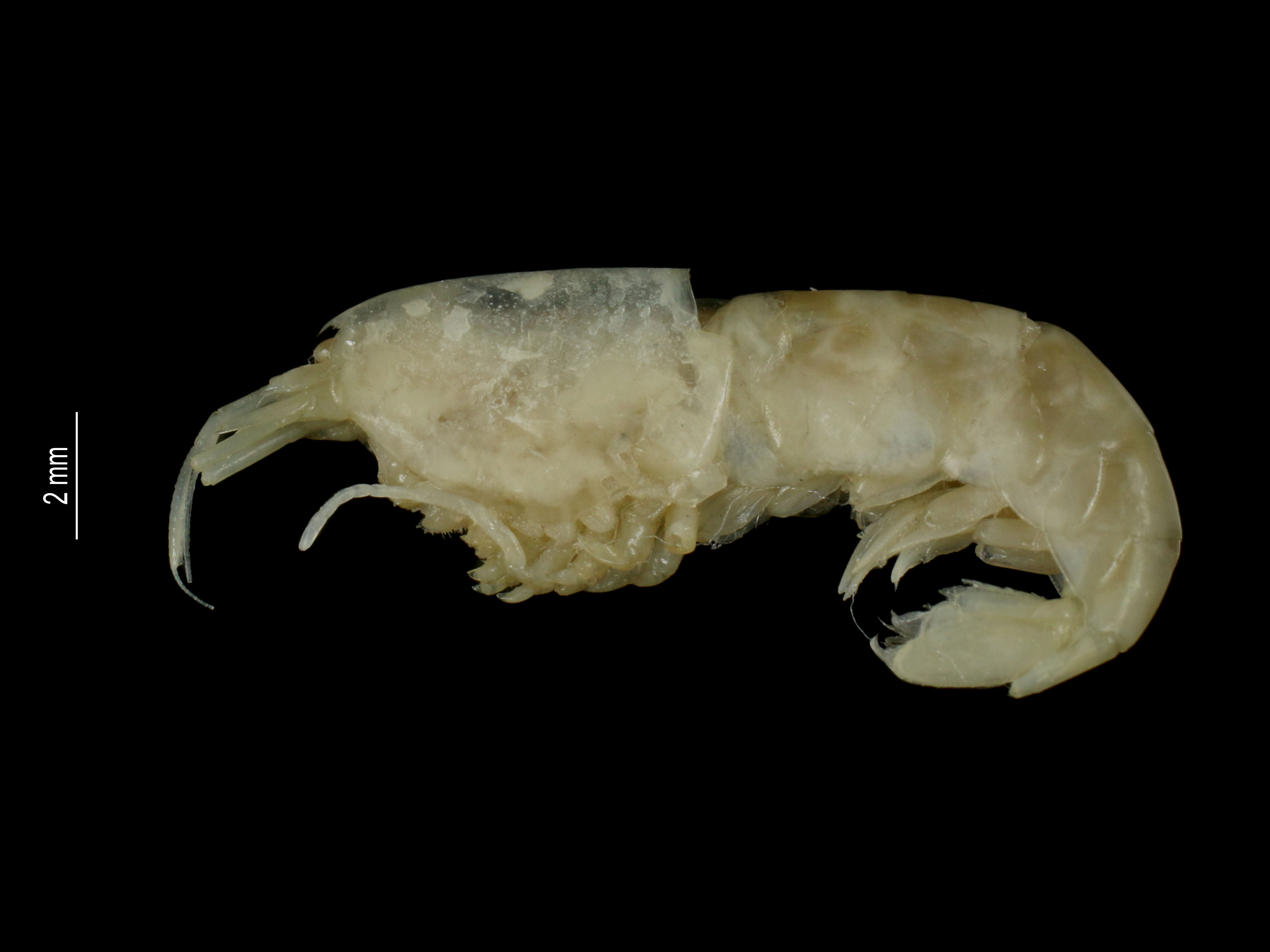
- Automate salomoni

Scientific classification
- Kingdom: Animalia
- Phylum: Arthropoda
- Clade: Pancrustacea
- Class: Malacostraca
- Order: Decapoda
- Suborder: Pleocyemata
- Infraorder: Caridea
- Family: Alpheidae
- Genus: Automate; De Man, 1888

= Automate (crustacean) =

Genus of crustaceans

Automate is a genus of pistol shrimp of the family Alpheidae, containing the following species:

- Automate anacanthopus de Man, 1910
- Automate anacanthopusoides Wang & Sha, 2017
- Automate arturi Ashrafi & De Grave, 2023
- Automate awaji Komai, Tamego & Hanano, 2020
- Automate branchialis Holthuis & Gottlieb, 1958
- Automate dolichognatha de Man, 1888
- Automate evermanni Rathbun, 1901
- Automate hayashii Anker & Komai, 2004
- Automate isabelae Ramos-Tafur, 2018
- Automate rectifrons Chace, 1972
- Automate rugosa Coutière, 1902
- Automate salomoni Coutière, 1908
- Automate spinosa Wang & Sha, 2017
- Automate talismani Coutière, 1902
