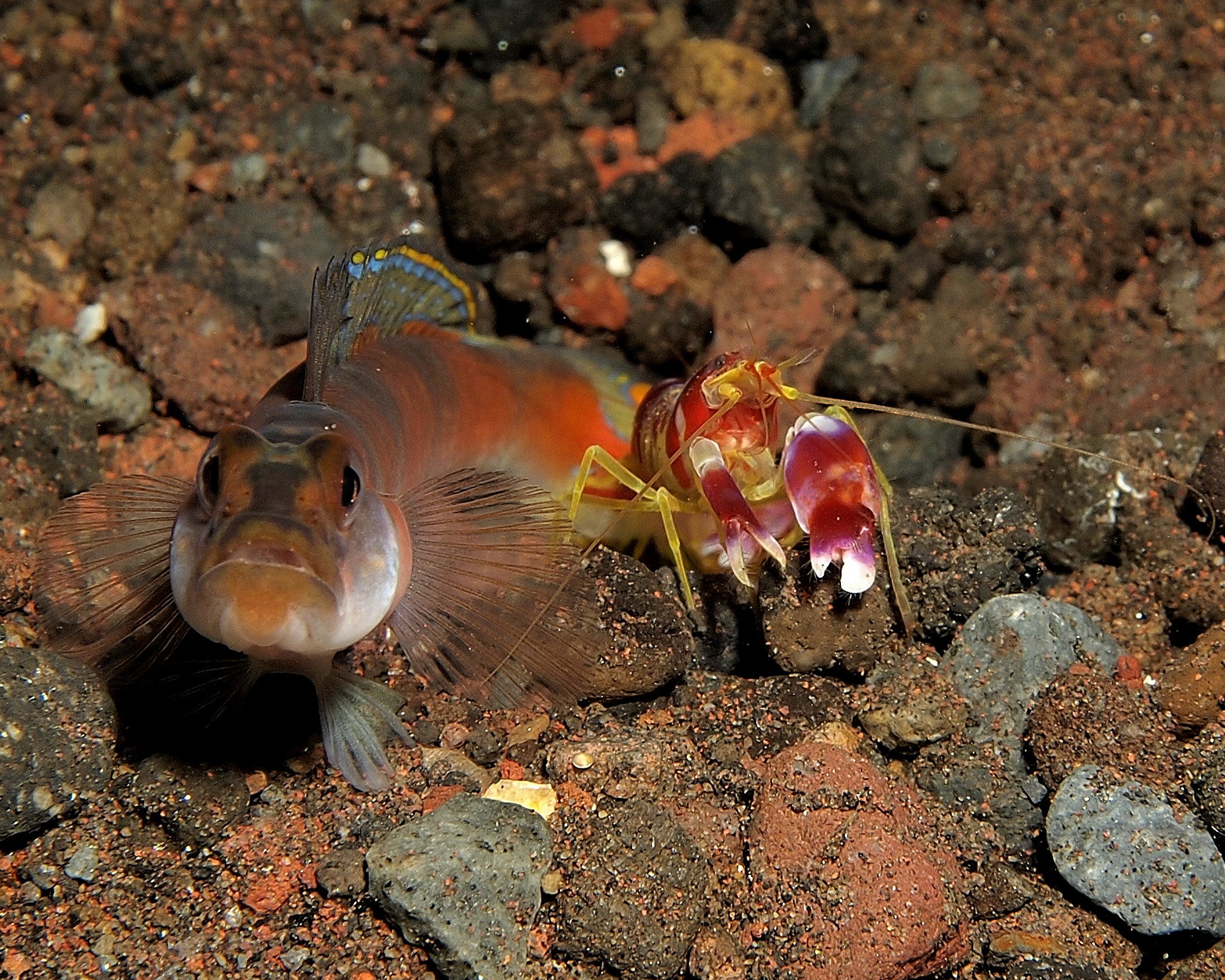

Scientific classification
- Domain: Eukaryota
- Kingdom: Animalia
- Phylum: Chordata
- Class: Actinopterygii
- Order: Gobiiformes
- Family: Gobiidae
- Genus: Amblyeleotris
- Species: A. yanoi

Binomial name
- Amblyeleotris yanoi (Aonuma & Yoshino, 1996)

= Amblyeleotris yanoi =

Species of fish

Amblyeleotris yanoi is a marine benthic species of goby native to reef environments of the western Pacific Ocean. It is a small sized fish that can reach a maximum size of 13 centimetres (5.1 in) length for males and 5 centimetres (2.0 in) for females.
