= Deioneus sandizelli =

Scientific classification
- Kingdom: Animalia
- Phylum: Arthropoda
- Clade: Pancrustacea
- Class: Malacostraca
- Order: Decapoda
- Suborder: Pleocyemata
- Infraorder: Caridea
- Family: Alpheidae
- Genus: Deioneus; Dworschak, Anker & Abed-Navandi, 2000
- Species: D. sandizelli

Binomial name
- Deioneus sandizelli Dworschak, Anker & Abed-Navandi, 2000

Species of crustacean

Deioneus is a monotypic genus of shrimp of the family Alpheidae, containing only the species Deioneus sandizelli.
