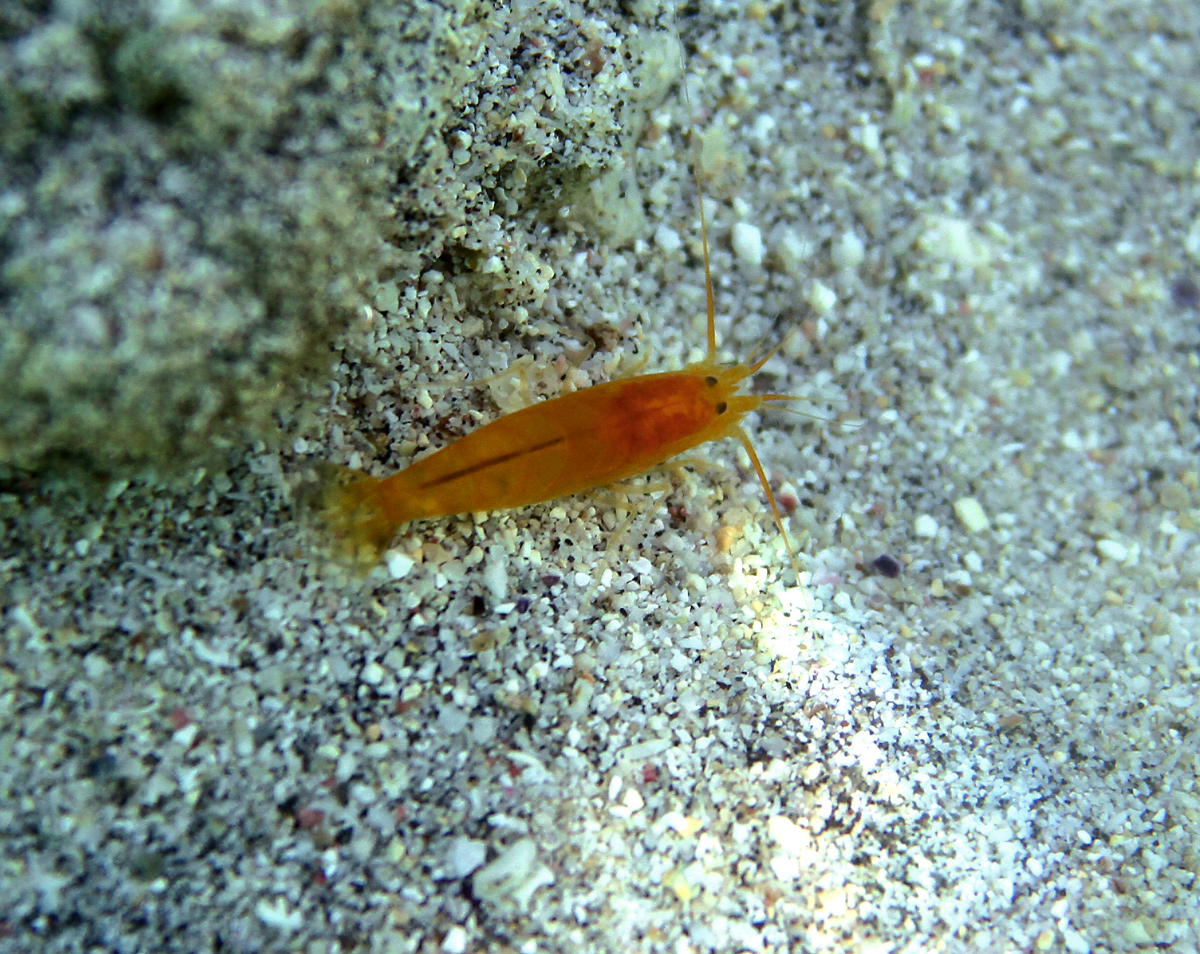

Scientific classification
- Kingdom: Animalia
- Phylum: Arthropoda
- Clade: Pancrustacea
- Class: Malacostraca
- Order: Decapoda
- Suborder: Pleocyemata
- Infraorder: Caridea
- Family: Alpheidae
- Genus: Salmoneus; Holthuis, 1955

= Salmoneus (crustacean) =

Genus of crustaceans

Salmoneus is a genus of shrimps of the family Alpheidae. Understanding of the genus has grown rapidly, with only 19 known species before 2000, to 69 species as of 2024.

== Species ==
The following species are recognised in the genus Salmoneus:

- Salmoneus aduncus Komai, 2022
- Salmoneus alius Ashrafi, Anker & Ďuriš, 2023
- Salmoneus alpheophilus Anker & Marin, 2006
- Salmoneus alvarezi Anker & Lazarus, 2015
- Salmoneus antricola Komai, Yamada & Yunokawa, 2015
- Salmoneus arabicus Anker, 2022
- Salmoneus armatus Anker, 2010
- Salmoneus arubae (Schmitt, 1936)
- Salmoneus auroculatus Anker & Marin, 2006
- Salmoneus babai Miyake & Miya, 1966
- Salmoneus brevirostris (Edmondson, 1930)
- Salmoneus brucei Komai, 2009
- Salmoneus bruni Banner & Banner, 1966
- Salmoneus caboverdensis Dworschak, Anker & Abed-Navandi, 2000
- Salmoneus camaroncito Anker, 2010
- Salmoneus carvachoi Anker, 2007
- Salmoneus cavicolus Felder & Manning, 1986
- Salmoneus chadwickae Ďuriš & Horká, 2016
- Salmoneus chelocrassus Ashrafi, Lin & Ďuriš, 2023
- Salmoneus colinorum De Grave, 2004
- Salmoneus cristatus (Coutière, 1897)
- Salmoneus degravei Anker, 2010
- Salmoneus depressus Anker, 2011
- Salmoneus durisi Anker & Ashrafi, 2019
- Salmoneus erasimorum Dworschak, Anker & Abed-Navandi, 2000
- Salmoneus excavatus Anker, 2011
- Salmoneus falcidactylus Anker & Marin, 2006
- Salmoneus farasan Anker, 2022
- Salmoneus gracilipes Miya, 1972
- Salmoneus hilarulus (De Man, 1910)
- Salmoneus hispaniolensis Anker, 2010
- Salmoneus ikaros Anker, Al-Kandari & De Grave, 2020
- Salmoneus inconspicuus Anker, 2020
- Salmoneus jarli (Holthuis, 1951)
- Salmoneus kausti Anker, 2022
- Salmoneus kekovae Grippa, 2004
- Salmoneus komaii Anker, 2011
- Salmoneus latirostris (Coutière, 1897)
- Salmoneus malagensis Anker & Lazarus, 2015
- Salmoneus mauiensis (Edmondson, 1930)
- Salmoneus nhatrangensis Anker & Marin, 2006
- Salmoneus ortmanni (Rankin, 1898)
- Salmoneus paracristatus Ashrafi, Anker & Ďuriš, 2023
- Salmoneus paulayi Anker, 2011
- Salmoneus pinguis Komai & Anker, 2012
- Salmoneus poupini Anker, 2011
- Salmoneus pusillus Anker & Marin, 2006
- Salmoneus rashedi Ashrafi, Ďuriš & Naderloo, 2020
- Salmoneus rocas Anker, 2007
- Salmoneus rostratus Barnard, 1962
- Salmoneus saotomensis Anker, 2020
- Salmoneus serratidigitus (Coutière, 1897)
- Salmoneus seticheles Anker, 2003
- Salmoneus setosus Manning & Chace, 1990
- Salmoneus shojaei Ashrafi, Anker & Ďuriš, 2022
- Salmoneus sibogae (De Man, 1910)
- Salmoneus singaporensis Anker, 2003
- Salmoneus singularis Komai, Maenosono & Naruse, 2021
- Salmoneus sketi Fransen, 1991
- Salmoneus spiridonovi Marin, 2021
- Salmoneus tafaongae Banner & Banner, 1966
- Salmoneus teres Manning & Chace, 1990
- Salmoneus tiburon Anker, 2019
- Salmoneus tricristatus Banner, 1959
- Salmoneus venustus Anker, 2019
- Salmoneus wehrtmanni Anker, 2010
- Salmoneus yoyo Anker, Firdaus & Pratama, 2014
