= Batella =

Scientific classification
- Domain: Eukaryota
- Kingdom: Animalia
- Phylum: Arthropoda
- Class: Malacostraca
- Order: Decapoda
- Suborder: Pleocyemata
- Infraorder: Caridea
- Family: Alpheidae
- Genus: Batella; Holthuis, 1955

Synonyms
- Cheirothrix Bate, 1888 (preoccupied by Cheirothrix Pictet & Humbert, 1866)

Genus of crustaceans

Batella is a genus of snapping shrimp comprising three species:

- Batella leptocarpus Chace, 1988
- Batella parvimanus (Bate, 1888) (syn. Batella bifurcata Miya & Miyake, 1968)
- Batella praecipua De Grave, 2004
