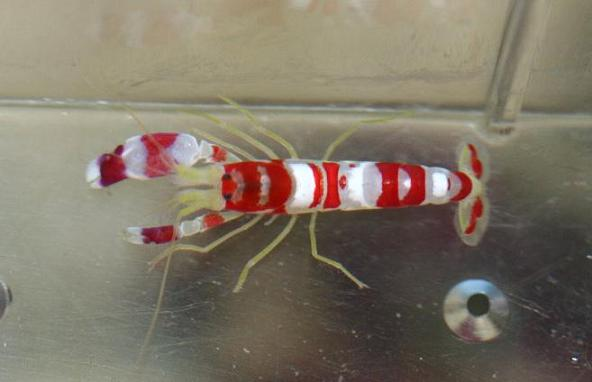

Scientific classification
- Domain: Eukaryota
- Kingdom: Animalia
- Phylum: Arthropoda
- Class: Malacostraca
- Order: Decapoda
- Suborder: Pleocyemata
- Infraorder: Caridea
- Family: Alpheidae
- Genus: Alpheus
- Species: A. randalli

Binomial name
- Alpheus randalli Banner & Banner, 1980

= Alpheus randalli =

Species of crustacean

Alpheus randalli is a species of snapping shrimp in the family Alpheidae. It lives in the Marquesas Islands and parts of the Indian Ocean, including the Seychelles, in association with a goby of the genus Amblyeleotris. The shrimp is transparent or white with prominent red markings.

== Description ==
Alpheus randalli is a medium-sized snapping shrimp growing to about 3 centimetres (1.2 in) long. The rostrum of Alpheus randalli is half as long again as it is broad and the carapace is not laterally compressed. The chelipeds are asymmetric, one carrying a massive snapping claw. The background colour of this shrimp is white or transparent with red bands and spots on the rostrum and both large and small chelipeds. There are further bands of white and red on the abdomen and the tips of the uropods are red. The tips of the thoracic appendages are yellowish-green.

== Distribution ==
Alpheus randalli was first described in 1981 from the Marquesas Islands in the Indian Ocean where it was found living at a depth of 18 metres (59 ft) in association with a previously undescribed species of goby in the genus Amblyeleotris. This has now been given the name Randall's prawn goby (Amblyeleotris randalli).

== Biology ==
The goby and shrimp share the same extensive burrow which the shrimp excavates in sandy or silty areas of the seabed. It has one or more openings, the positions of which are constantly changing as the shrimp engages in burrowing activities. During the day, the goby rests on the burrow floor with its head by the opening or may emerge further. It feeds by picking small invertebrates out of the substrate that has been disturbed by the shrimp or by taking mouthfuls of sediment and extracting edible organisms and detritus. The shrimp is mainly a detritus feeder. The shrimp has poor sight and is alert to the actions of the goby. The shrimp is more vulnerable to predation and is quick to retreat to safety even when the danger level is low. If the fish swims into the burrow head first to escape more immediate danger, the shrimp darts in immediately. At night, both retreat into the interior of the burrow and the entrances are sealed.

The goby probably lays its eggs in a mass in the burrow as happens with other members of this genus. The shrimp lives singly in the burrow and at breeding time probably make an opening close to an adjoining burrow occupied by a shrimp of the opposite sex. The female shrimp carries her eggs under her abdomen.
