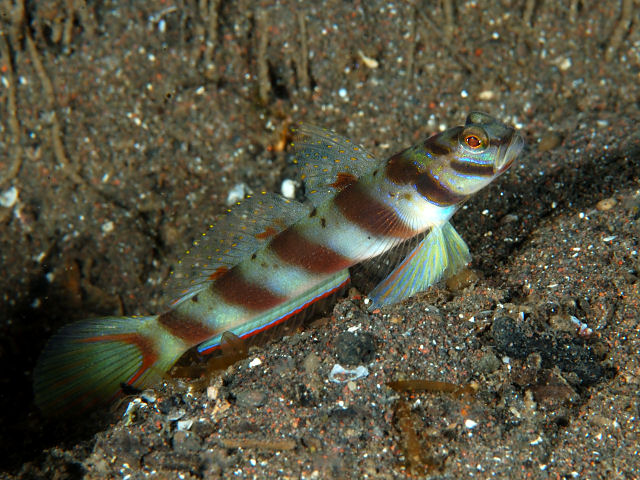
- Amblyeleotris diagonalis
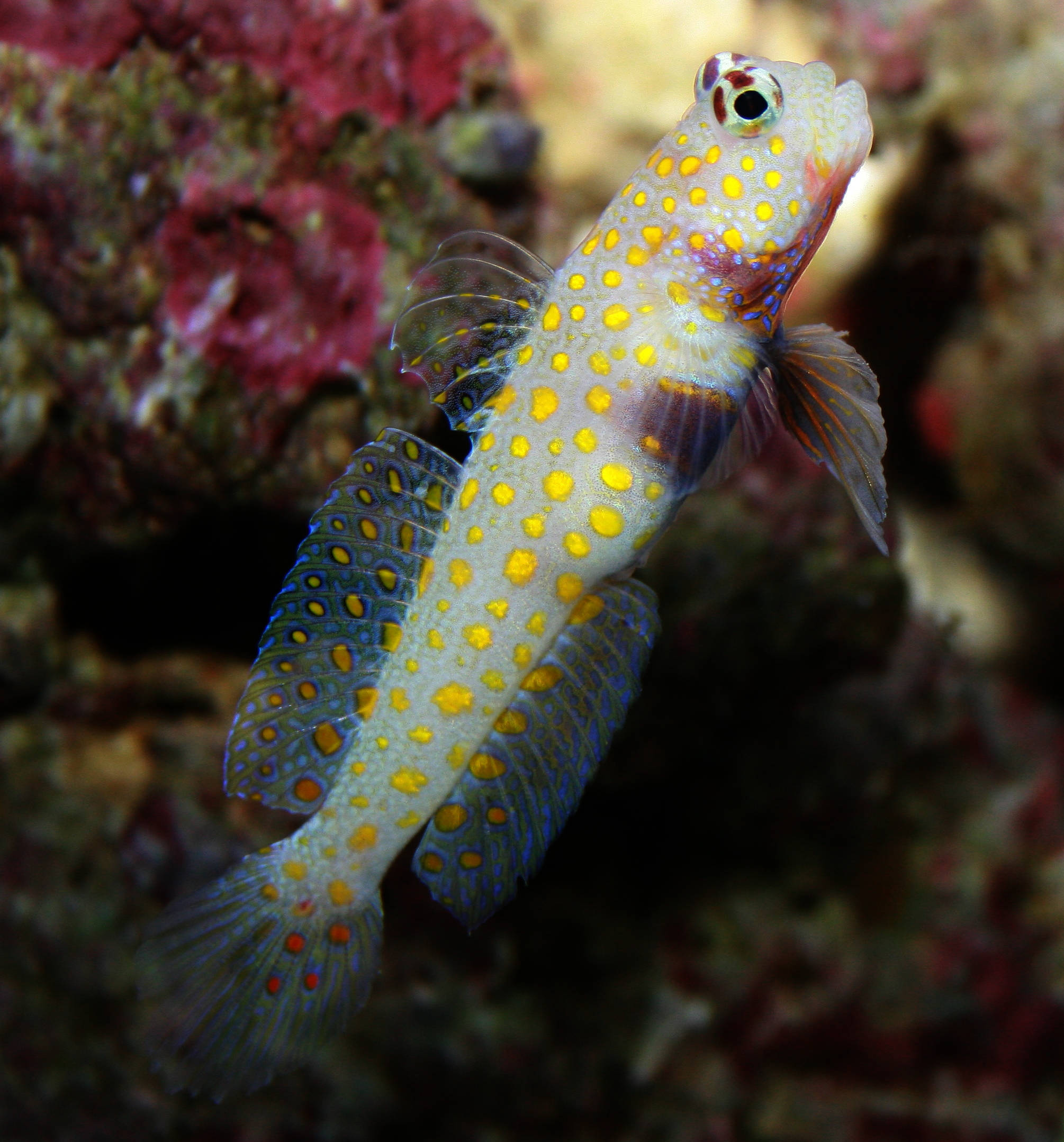
- Amblyeleotris guttata

Scientific classification
- Kingdom: Animalia
- Phylum: Chordata
- Class: Actinopterygii
- Division: Teleostei
- Order: Gobiiformes
- Family: Gobiidae
- Subfamily: Gobiinae
- Genus: Amblyeleotris; Bleeker, 1874

Type species
- Eleotris periophthalmus Bleeker, 1853

Synonyms
- Biat Seale, 1910; Cryptocentrops Smith, 1958; Fereleotris (subgenus of Amblyeleotris) Smith, 1958; Pteroculiops Fowler, 1938; Zebreleotris Herre, 1953

= Amblyeleotris =

Genus of fishes

Amblyeleotris is a genus of fish in the family Gobiidae found throughout the Indo-Pacific region. This is the largest genus of the shrimp gobies or prawn gobies, so-called because of their symbiotic relationship with certain alpheid shrimps. The shrimp excavates and maintains a burrow used by both animals while the goby, which has far superior eyesight, acts as a lookout for predators. The shrimp maintains almost constant contact with the fish with an antenna. Fossil Amblyeleotris otoliths have been found together with alpheid shrimp remnants from as early as late early Miocene (Burdigalian) suggesting a possible mutualistic association since then.

The species of Amblyeleotris vary considerably in size from less than 30 mm (1.2 in) to almost 200 mm (7.9 in) standard length.

== Species ==
There are currently 38 recognized species in this genus:

- Amblyeleotris arcupinna Mohlmann & Munday, 1999 (Arc-fin shrimpgoby)
- Amblyeleotris aurora (Polunin & Lubbock, 1977) (Pink-bar prawngoby)
- Amblyeleotris bellicauda J. E. Randall, 2004
- Amblyeleotris biguttata J. E. Randall, 2004 (Twin-spot shrimpgoby)
- Amblyeleotris bleekeri I. S. Chen, K. T. Shao & J. P. Chen, 2006
- Amblyeleotris callopareia Polunin & Lubbock, 1979 (Beautiful-cheek shrimpgoby)
- Amblyeleotris cephalotaenia (Y. Ni, 1989)
- Amblyeleotris delicatulus J. L. B. Smith, 1958
- Amblyeleotris diagonalis Polunin & Lubbock, 1979 (Diagonal shrimpgoby)
- Amblyeleotris downingi J. E. Randall, 1994 (Downing's shrimpgoby)
- Amblyeleotris ellipse J. E. Randall, 2004
- Amblyeleotris fasciata (Herre, 1953) (Red-banded prawngoby)
- Amblyeleotris fontanesii (Bleeker, 1853) (Giant prawngoby)
- Amblyeleotris guttata (Fowler, 1938) (Spotted prawngoby)
- Amblyeleotris gymnocephala (Bleeker, 1853) (Masked shrimpgoby)
- Amblyeleotris harrisorum Mohlmann & J. E. Randall, 2002
- Amblyeleotris japonica Takagi, 1957
- †Amblyeleotris kireedam Carolin, Bajpai, Maurya & Schwarzhans, 2022 (otolith based fossil species)
- Amblyeleotris latifasciata Polunin & Lubbock, 1979 (Wide-barred shrimpgoby)
- Amblyeleotris macronema Polunin & Lubbock, 1979 (Long-spine shrimpgoby)
- Amblyeleotris marquesas Mohlmann & J. E. Randall, 2002
- Amblyeleotris masuii Aonuma & Yoshino, 1996 (Masui's shrimpgoby)
- Amblyeleotris melanocephala Aonuma, Iwata & Yoshino, 2000 (Black-head shrimpgoby)
- Amblyeleotris memnonia Prokofiev, 2016
- Amblyeleotris morishitai Senou & Aonuma, 2007
- Amblyeleotris neglecta Jaafar & J. E. Randall, 2009
- Amblyeleotris novaecaledoniae Goren, 1981
- Amblyeleotris ogasawarensis Yanagisawa, 1978 (Red-spotted shrimpgoby)
- Amblyeleotris periophthalma (Bleeker, 1853) (Broad-banded shrimpgoby)
- Amblyeleotris randalli Hoese & Steene, 1978 (Randall's prawngoby)
- Amblyeleotris rhyax Polunin & Lubbock, 1979 (Volcano shrimpgoby)
- Amblyeleotris rubrimarginata Mohlmann & J. E. Randall, 2002 (Red-margin shrimpgoby)
- Amblyeleotris steinitzi (Klausewitz, 1974) (Steinitz' prawngoby)
- Amblyeleotris stenotaeniata J. E. Randall, 2004
- Amblyeleotris sungami (Klausewitz, 1969) (Magnus' prawngoby)
- Amblyeleotris taipinensis I. S. Chen, K. T. Shao & J. P. Chen, 2006
- Amblyeleotris triguttata J. E. Randall, 1994 (Triple-spot shrimpgoby)
- Amblyeleotris wheeleri (Polunin & Lubbock, 1977) (Gorgeous prawngoby)
- Amblyeleotris yanoi Aonuma & Yoshino, 1996 (Flag-tail shrimpgoby)
