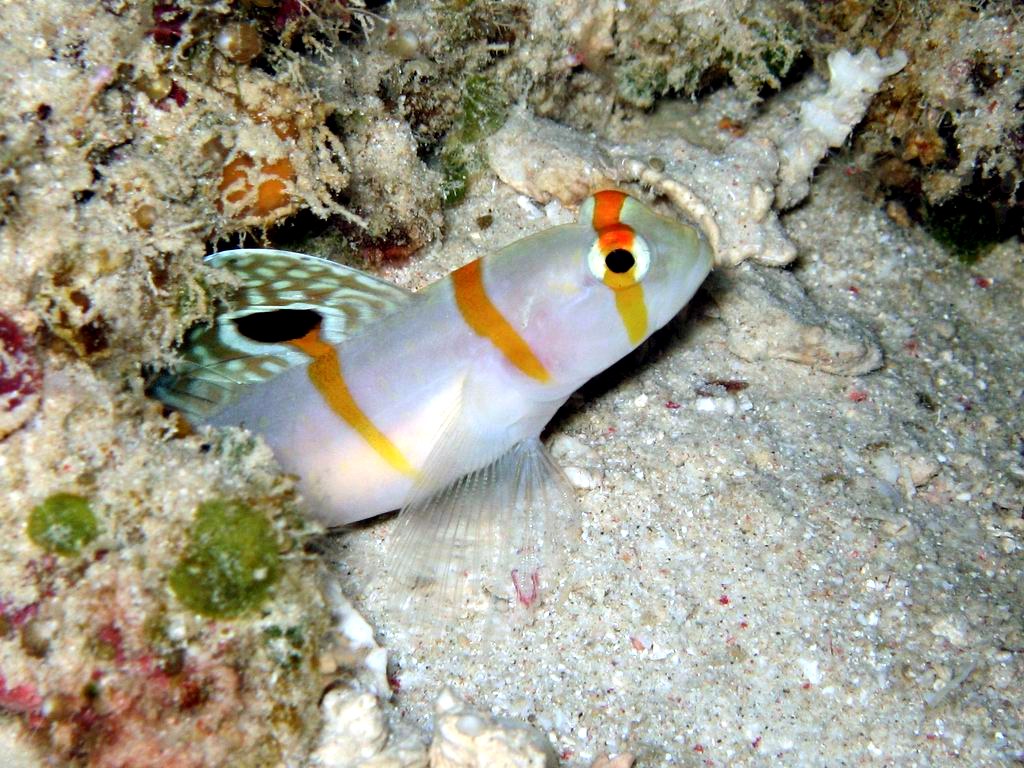
- Amblyeleotris randalli

Scientific classification
- Kingdom: Animalia
- Phylum: Chordata
- Class: Actinopterygii
- Order: Gobiiformes
- Family: Gobiidae
- Genus: Amblyeleotris
- Species: A. randalli

Binomial name
- Amblyeleotris randalli Hoese & Steene, 1978

= Randall's prawn goby =

Species of fish

Amblyeleotris randalli, Randall's prawn goby, is a marine benthic species of goby native to tropical reefs of the central Indo-Pacific. This species can also be found in the aquarium trade.

== Description ==
A. randalli is a small fish which can be up to 9 centimetres (3.5 in) long. Its body is lengthened and cylindrical. The background coloration is white and banded with orange to yellow fine stripes. The first stripe goes around the front head passing through the eye. A multitude of small whitish dots are distributed on the white parts of the body. Other distinctive point, on the anterior dorsal fin when the latter is deployed, a black and white eye-spot can be seen. Eyes are round and prominent. The mouth is big and in the shape of an inverted "U".

== Habitat ==
A. randalli can be found on soft substrates constituted of coarse and shell sand in rubble caves at depths of from 25 to 50 metres (82 to 164 ft). It has been recorded in association with a species of prawn, generally Alpheus ochrostriatus.

== Feeding ==
A. randalli has a carnivorous diet and usually eats small crustaceans or fishes passing close to its burrow.

== Name ==
The specific name and common name honour the ichthyologist John E. Randall (born 1924) of the Bishop Museum in Honolulu, who drew the attention of the authors to this goby.
