= Stimpson =

Stimpson is a surname, and may refer to:

- Sandy Stimpson, mayor of Mobile, Alabama since 2013
- Charles R. Stimpson ((1919–1983), U.S. Navy fighter ace
- Jodie Stimpson, British professional triathlete
- Tim Stimpson, rugby player
- John Stimpson, tennis player
- William Stimpson (1832–1872), American marine biologist
- Harry F. Stimpson Jr., lawyer and ambassador

As a given name:

- Stimpy, a fictional cat, whose full name is "Stimpson J. Cat"
