= Henri Coutière =

French zoologist (1869–1952)

François Louis Henri Coutière (4 March 1869 in Saulzet – 23 August 1952 in Orvilliers) was a French zoologist, who specialized in the field of carcinology (crustaceans).

In 1895 he received his bachelor's degree in natural sciences, and during the following year, obtained his pharmacy degree 1st class. By way of a recommendation from Alphonse Milne-Edwards, he embarked on a zoological mission to the Red Sea in 1897 on behalf of the Muséum d'Histoire Naturelle. In 1899 he was named chef de service under Milne-Edwards in the laboratory of anatomic zoology at the École des hautes études.

In 1899 he obtained his doctorate in natural sciences with a dissertation-thesis on the snapping shrimp family Alpheidae, and during the following year began teaching classes in zoology at the École supérieure de Pharmacie in Paris. From 1902 to 1937 he was a full professor of zoology at the school of pharmacy.

In 1910 he was appointed president of the Société zoologique de France. The shrimp genera Coutierea and Coutierella (family Palaemonidae) commemorate his name, as do species with the epithet coutierei; e.g. Stenothoe coutieri (Chevreux, 1908).

== Selected works ==
- Les "Alpheidae," morphologie externe et interne, formes larvaires, bionomie, 1899 – On Alpheidae, external and internal morphology, larval forms, bionomics.
- Poissons vénimeux et poissons vénéneux. Venins, toxalbumines du sérum et des organes, toxines microbiennes d'infection et de putréfaction, 1899 – Venomous fish and fish poisons.
- Crustacés schizopodes et décapodes, 1918 – Schizopods and decapods.
- Le monde vivant (5 volumes 1927–30; preface by Léon Guignard) – The living world.
- Connais-toi ou la physiologie sans pleurs, 1936.
- Connais tes ennemis. Les ennemis extèrieurs, 1938.
- Connais tes ennemis. Les ennemis intérieurs, 1939.
- Connais tes outils. Diastases, vitamines, hormones 1943.
