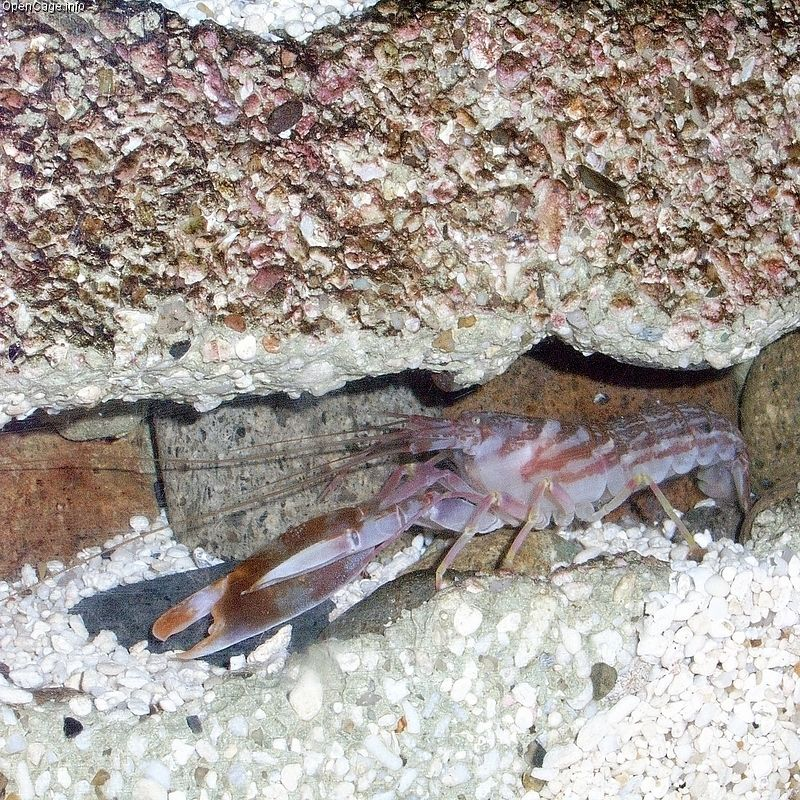
- Alpheus digitalis
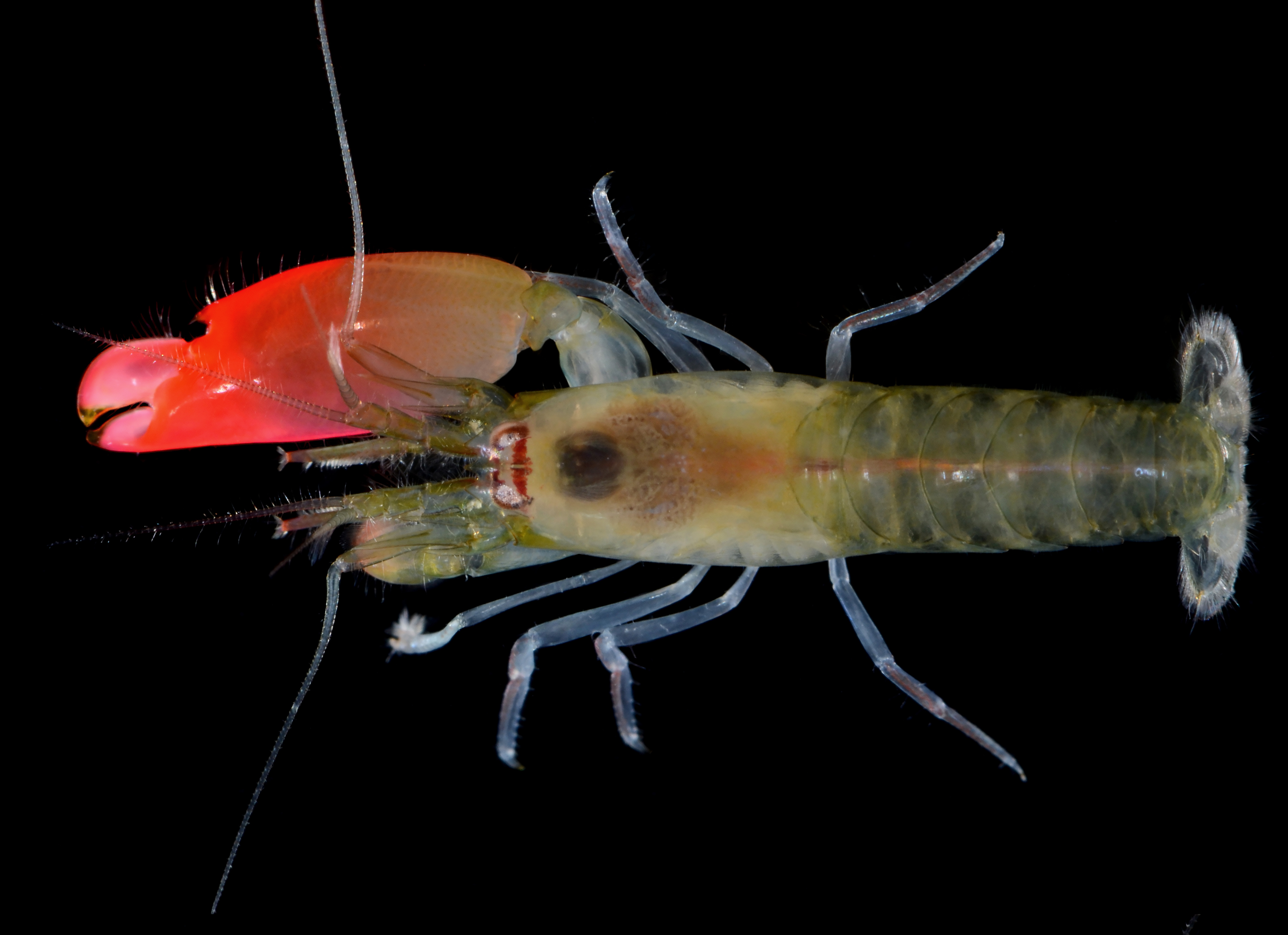
- Synalpheus pinkfloydi

Scientific classification
- Kingdom: Animalia
- Phylum: Arthropoda
- Clade: Pancrustacea
- Class: Malacostraca
- Order: Decapoda
- Suborder: Pleocyemata
- Infraorder: Caridea
- Superfamily: Alpheoidea
- Family: Alpheidae; Rafinesque, 1815

= Alpheidae =

Family of crustacean possessing asymmetrical snapping claws

Alpheidae (also known as the snapping shrimp, pistol shrimp, or cracker shrimp) is a family of the shrimp infraorder Caridea that is characterized by having an enlarged and highly modified chelae ("claws") on one leg of their first pair, which is used for various purposes. Around half of the species, such as those in the genus Potamalpheops, lack this trait and have been dubbed "non-snapping shrimp".

The family is diverse and worldwide in distribution, consisting of about 1,119 species within 38 or more genera. The two most speciose genera are Alpheus and Synalpheus, with species numbering well over 330 and 160, respectively. Most snapping shrimp dig burrows and are common inhabitants of coral reefs, submerged seagrass flats, and oyster reefs. While most genera and species are found in tropical and temperate coastal and marine waters, Betaeus inhabits cold seas and Potamalpheops has a cosmopolitan distribution including being found in freshwater caves.

When living in colonies, the sound produced by snapping shrimp can interfere with sonar and other forms of underwater communication. The shrimp are considered a major source of sound in the ocean.

== Description ==
Snapping shrimp grow to 3–5 cm (1.2–2.0 in) in length. Many pistol shrimp species have one disproportionately large "claw" (more accurately the chelae) which is larger than half the shrimp's body; this claw may be found on either "arm" (first pair of legs or chelipeds). It is a modification of the typical crustacean "pincer" which forms a pistol-like organ made of two parts: a joint allows the "hammer" component to move backward into a right-angled position. When released, it snaps into the other part of the claw, emitting an enormously powerful wave of bubbles capable of stunning larger fish and breaking small glass jars.

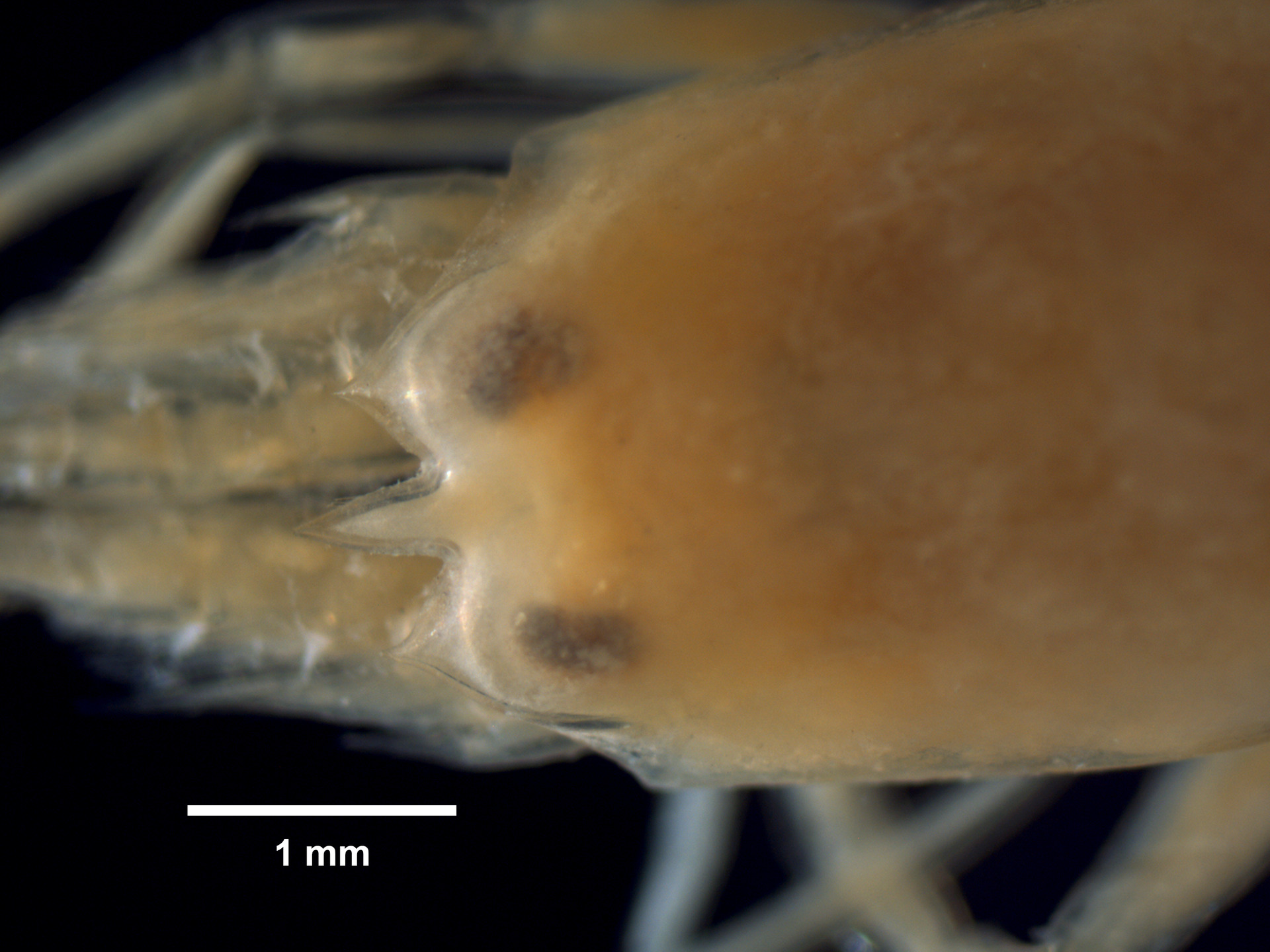
The eyes on Synalpheus bradleyi are enclosed within the carapace, within the orbital hood

The development of increasingly powerful snaps is thought to be linked to the parallel development of an "orbital hood", an outgrowth of the carapace which encloses the eyes in species of Alpheus and Synalpheus, which produce the strongest snaps within the family. Experiments suggest this hood dampens the shockwaves received from the snapping of other shrimp, with the helmets protecting these shrimp from neurotrauma.

The snapping claw is a versatile tool, used in hunting, communication, defense against predators, burrowing, and rock-boring. When hunting, the shrimp usually lies in an obscured spot, such as a burrow. The shrimp then extends its antennae outwards to determine if any fish are passing by. Once it feels movement, the shrimp inches out of its hiding place, pulls back its claw, and releases a "shot", which stuns the prey; the shrimp then pulls it to the burrow and feeds on it.

Snapping shrimp have the ability to reverse claws. When the snapping claw is lost, the missing limb regenerates into a smaller claw and the original smaller appendage grows into a new snapping claw. Laboratory research has shown that severing the nerve of the snapping claw induces the conversion of the smaller limb into a second snapping claw. The reversal of claw asymmetry in snapping shrimp is thought to be unique in nature.

Snapping is also observed in some species of the closely-related family Palaemonidae, such as those within the genus Periclimenaeus. Within Alpheidae, snapping is also thought to have arisen independently several times within the family, though the exact amount requires taxonomic revision of the genera.

=== Snapping mechanics ===
Snapping shrimp claw action: 1. Closed pistol shrimp claw with hidden plunger (P). 2. Open claw with exposed (P) and chamber (C). 3. Open claw with water (W) entering (C). 4. Claw with (P) pushed into chamber (C), forcing jet stream (J) out of (C)

Several mechanisms on the chelae allow these shrimp to create forceful snaps, such as modification to the dactyl (movable finger)'s joint, adhesive plaques, a tooth-cavity system on the fingers' cutting edge, and the enlargement of the snapping claw itself. The adhesive plaques use Stefan adhesion to allow the chela to resist closing, allowing it to generate more tension and potential energy.

The resultant snap may create a cavitation bubble that generates acoustic pressures up to 80 kilopascals (12 psi) at a distance of 4 cm (1.6 in) from the claw. As it ejects from the claw, the bubble reaches speeds of 25 m/s (90 km/h; 56 mph). The pressure is high enough to kill small fish. It corresponds to a peak pressure level of 218 decibels relative to one micropascal (dB re 1 μPa), equivalent to a zero to peak source level of 190 dB re 1 μPa m. Au and Banks measured peak-to-peak source levels between 185 and 190 dB re 1 μPa m, depending on the size of the claw. Similar values are reported by Ferguson and Cleary. The duration of the click is less than 1 millisecond.

The snap can also produce sonoluminescence from the collapsing cavitation bubble. As it collapses, the cavitation bubble emits a short flash of light with a broad spectrum. If the light were of thermal origin, a temperature of the emitter over 5,000 K (4,700 °C) would be required. In comparison, the surface temperature of the Sun is estimated to be around 5,772 K (5,500 °C). The light is of lower intensity than the light produced by typical sonoluminescence, and is not visible to the naked eye. It is most likely a byproduct of the shock wave with no biological significance. However, this was the first known instance of an animal producing light by this effect. Subsequently, another group of crustaceans, the mantis shrimp, has been discovered to contain species whose club-like forelimbs can strike so quickly and with such force as to induce sonoluminescent cavitation bubbles upon impact.

The snapping shrimp competes with much larger animals, such as the sperm whale and beluga whale, for the title of loudest animal in the sea. When in colonies, the snapping shrimp can interfere with sonar and underwater communication. The shrimp are a major source of noise in the ocean and can interfere with anti-submarine warfare.

== Ecology ==
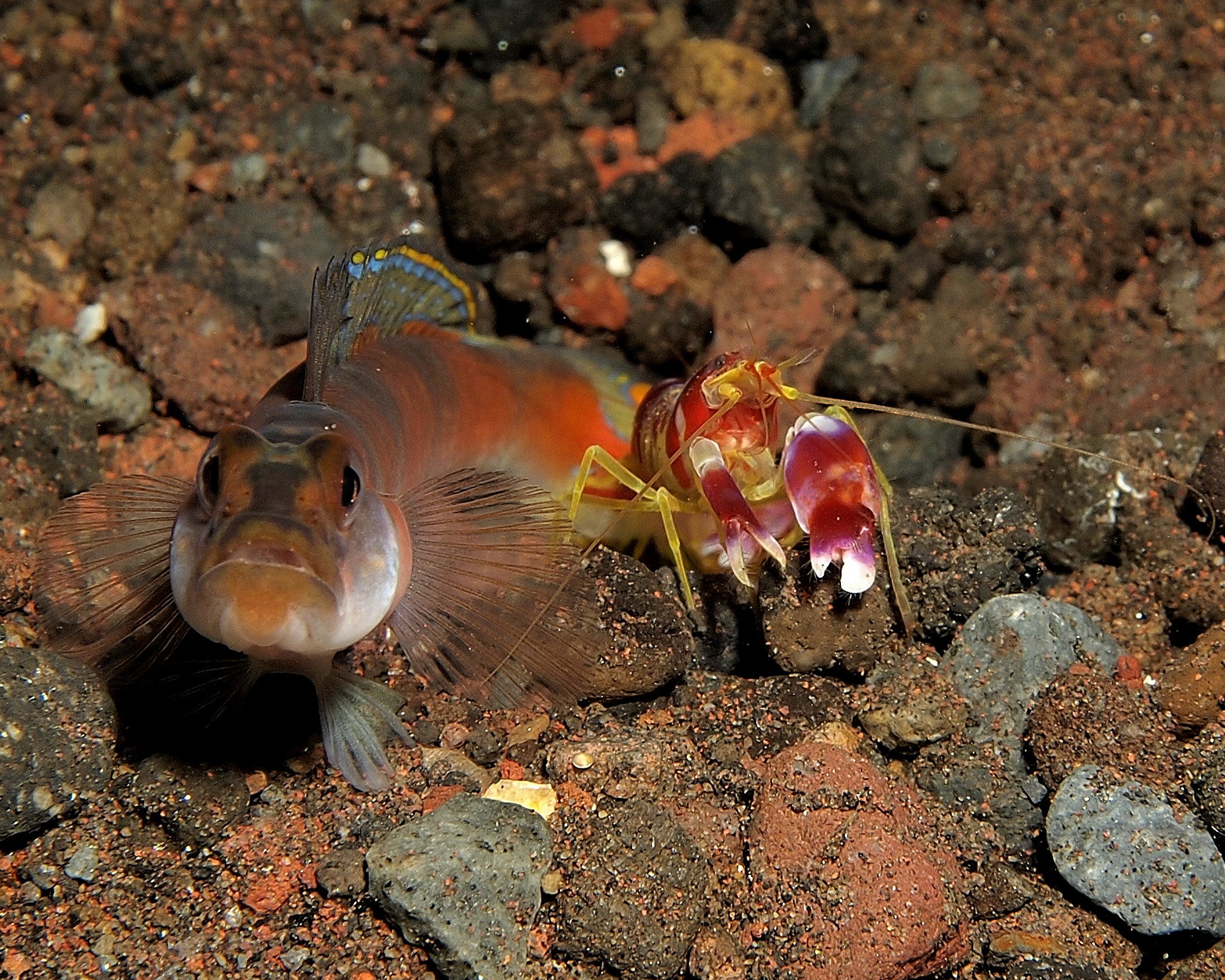
Alpheus randalli with a goby of the genus Amblyeleotris

Some snapping shrimp species share burrows with goby fish in a mutualistic symbiotic relationship: the burrow is built and tended by the pistol shrimp, and the goby provides protection by watching out for danger. When both are out of the burrow, the shrimp maintains contact with the goby using its antennae. The goby, with better vision, alerts the shrimp of danger using a characteristic tail movement, and they both then retreat into the safety of the shared burrow. This association has been observed in species that inhabit coral reef habitats.

Eusocial behavior has been discovered in the genus Synalpheus. These species, such as Synalpheus regalis, live inside sponges in colonies that can number over 300. All of them are the offspring of a single, large female, the queen, and possibly a single male. The offspring are divided into workers that care for the young and predominantly male soldiers that protect the colony with their huge claws, similar to the castes of eusocial insects. Morphological and DNA analysis suggests that eusociality in Synalpheus arose independently among the species.

Snapping shrimp retain the same mate after copulation, making them monogamous. Young females become receptive to males either just before (premolt stage) or after the puberty molt, making them physiologically mature and morphologically able to carry the egg mass. Male presence during the molt is beneficial for the female, as searching for a male during her soft-bodied, receptive phase would put her at mortal risk. Mates have more success with partners having greater body mass. These animals practice mate guarding, leading to a decline in mate competition, as well as bonding of partners. The male and female defend their shelter to protect both territory and young. Larvae develop in three stages—nauplius, zoea, and the postlarval stages.

== Taxonomy ==
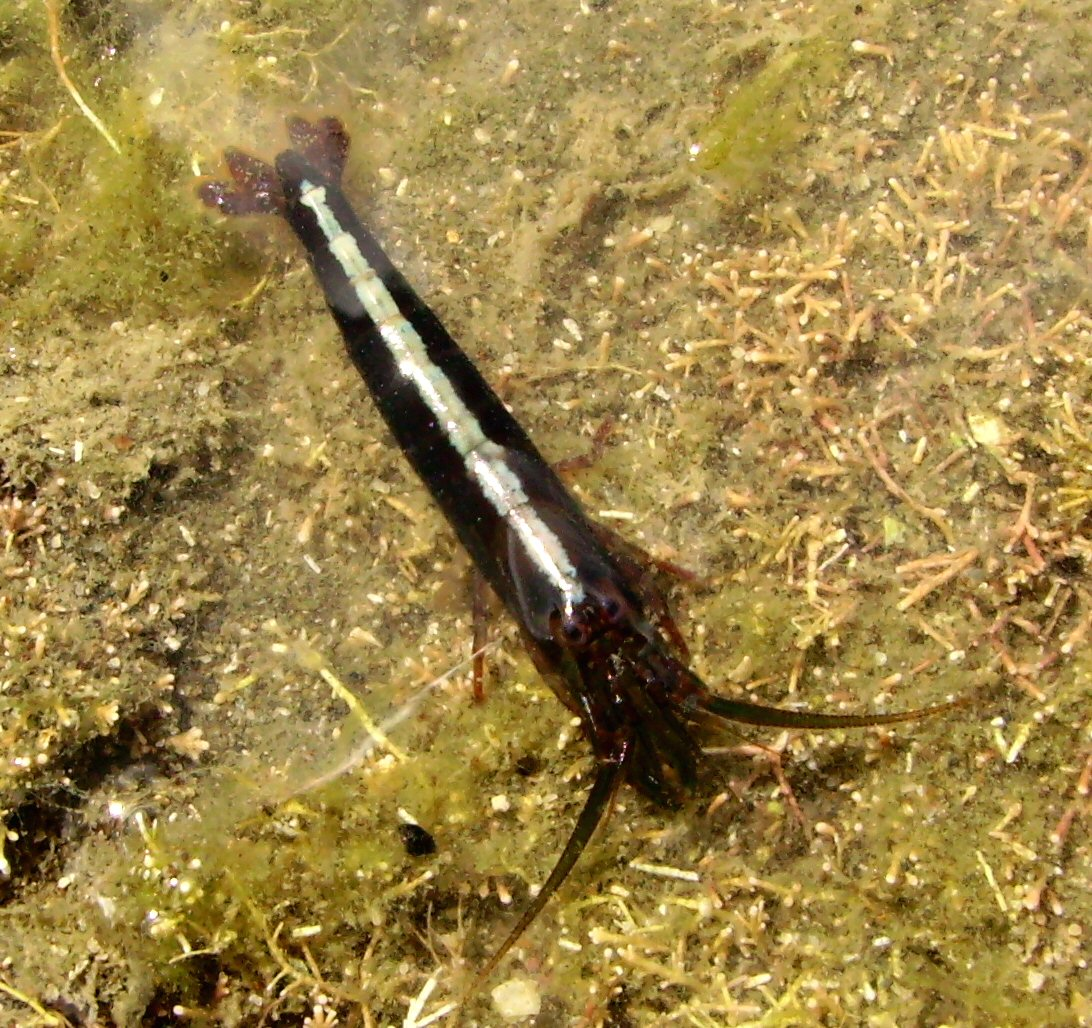
Betaeopsis aequimanus

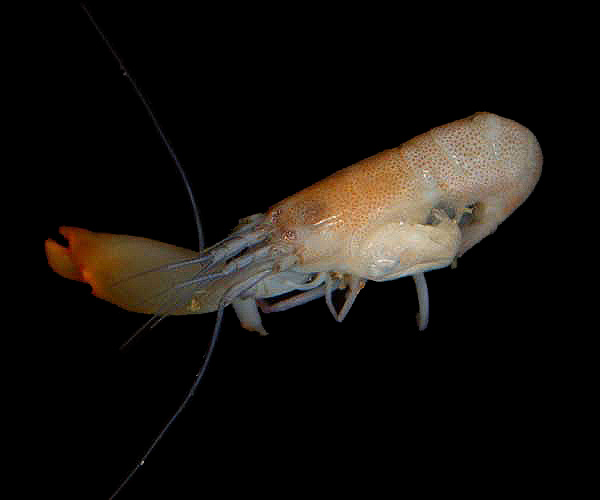
Synalpheus fritzmuelleri

More than 620 species are currently recognised in the family Alpheidae, distributed among 52 genera, though alternatively there may be 750 recognized species in 49 genera. The largest of these are Alpheus, with 336 species, and Synalpheus, with 168 species. The following genera are recognised:

- Acanthanas Anker, Poddoubtchenko & Jeng, 2006
- Alpheopsis Coutière, 1897
- Alpheus Fabricius, 1798
- Amphibetaeus Coutière, 1897
- Arete Stimpson, 1860
- Aretopsis De Man, 1910
- Athanas Leach, 1814
- Athanopsis Coutière, 1897
- Automate De Man, 1888
- Bannereus Bruce, 1988
- Batella Holthuis, 1955
- Batellopsis Ashrafi, Ďuriš & Anker, 2024
- Bermudacaris Anker & Iliffe, 2000
- Betaeopsis Yaldwyn, 1971
- Betaeus Dana, 1852
- Bruceopsis Anker, 2010
- Caligoneus Komai & Fujita, 2018
- Coronalpheus Wicksten, 1999
- Coutieralpheus Anker & Felder, 2005
- Crosnierocaris Anker, 2022
- Deioneus Dworschak, Anker & Abed-Navandi, 2000
- Fenneralpheus Felder & Manning, 1986
- Harperalpheus Felder & Anker, 2007
- Jengalpheops Anker & Dworschak, 2007
- Leptalpheus Williams, 1965
- Leptathanas De Grave & Anker, 2008
- Leslibetaeus Anker, Poddoubtchenko & Wehrtmann, 2006
- Metabetaeus Borradaile, 1899
- Metalpheus Coutière, 1908
- Mohocaris Holthuis, 1973
- Nennalpheus Banner & Banner, 1981
- Notalpheus Méndez G. & Wicksten, 1982
- Orygmalpheus De Grave & Anker, 2000
- Pachelpheus Anker, 2020
- Parabetaeus Coutière, 1897
- Pomagnathus Chace, 1937
- Potamalpheops Powell, 1979
- Prionalpheus Banner & Banner, 1960
- Pseudalpheopsis Anker, 2007
- Pseudathanas Bruce, 1983
- Pterocaris Heller, 1862
- Racilius Paulson, 1875
- Richalpheus Anker & Jeng, 2006
- Rugathanas Anker & Jeng, 2007
- Salmoneus Holthuis, 1955
- Stenalpheops Miya, 1997
- Synalpheopsis Anker, 2023
- Synalpheus Spence Bate, 1888
- Thuylamea Nguyên, 2001
- Triacanthoneus Anker, 2010
- Vexillipar Chace, 1988
- Yagerocaris Kensley, 1988

Two genera, Anebocaris and Diaphoropus, are considered nomina dubia.

The following cladogram is based on a maximum likelihood phylogenetic tree from a 2021 study analyzing genetics:

- Alpheidae
  - - Bermudacaris aff. britayevi
    - Leslibetaeus
  - - - Automate
      - - Automate
        - Coronalpheus
    - - Yagerocaris
      - ⊞"Higher" Alpheids (Derived taxa)
        ⊟
        - - - - - - - - - - Vexilipar
                          - Bannereus anomalus
                        - Bannereus cf. chani
                      - Prionalpheus
                    - Alpheopsis
                  - - Alpheopsis
                    - Coutieralpheus
              - - - - - - - Alpheus
                          - Racilius
                        - Alpheus
                      - - Metalpheus
                        - Pomagnathus
                    - - - - - - Amphibetaeus
                              - Leptalpheus
                            - Leptalpheus
                          - Fenneralpheus
                        - Richalpheus
                      - Parabetaeus
                  - Nennalpheus
            - - - Jengalpheops
                - Pachelpheus
              - Metabetaeus
          - - - - Betaeopsis
                - Betaeus
              - Synalpheus
            - - - Caligoneus
                - - - Deioneus
                    - Triacanthoneus
                    - Salmoneus
                  - Salmoneus
              - - - - Potamalpheops
                    - Rugathanas
                  - Stenalpheops
                - - Aretopsis
                  - - Acanthanas
                    - - - Arete
                        - - Arete
                          - Athanas areteformis
                      - - Athanas
                        - - Athanas
                          - Athanopsis

Notably, this analysis recovered the non-monophyly of several genera, including Alpheopsis, Alpheus, Arete, Athanas, Automate, Leptalpheus, and Salmoneus. Bannereus and Metalpheus may also be paraphyletic, though requires further study.
