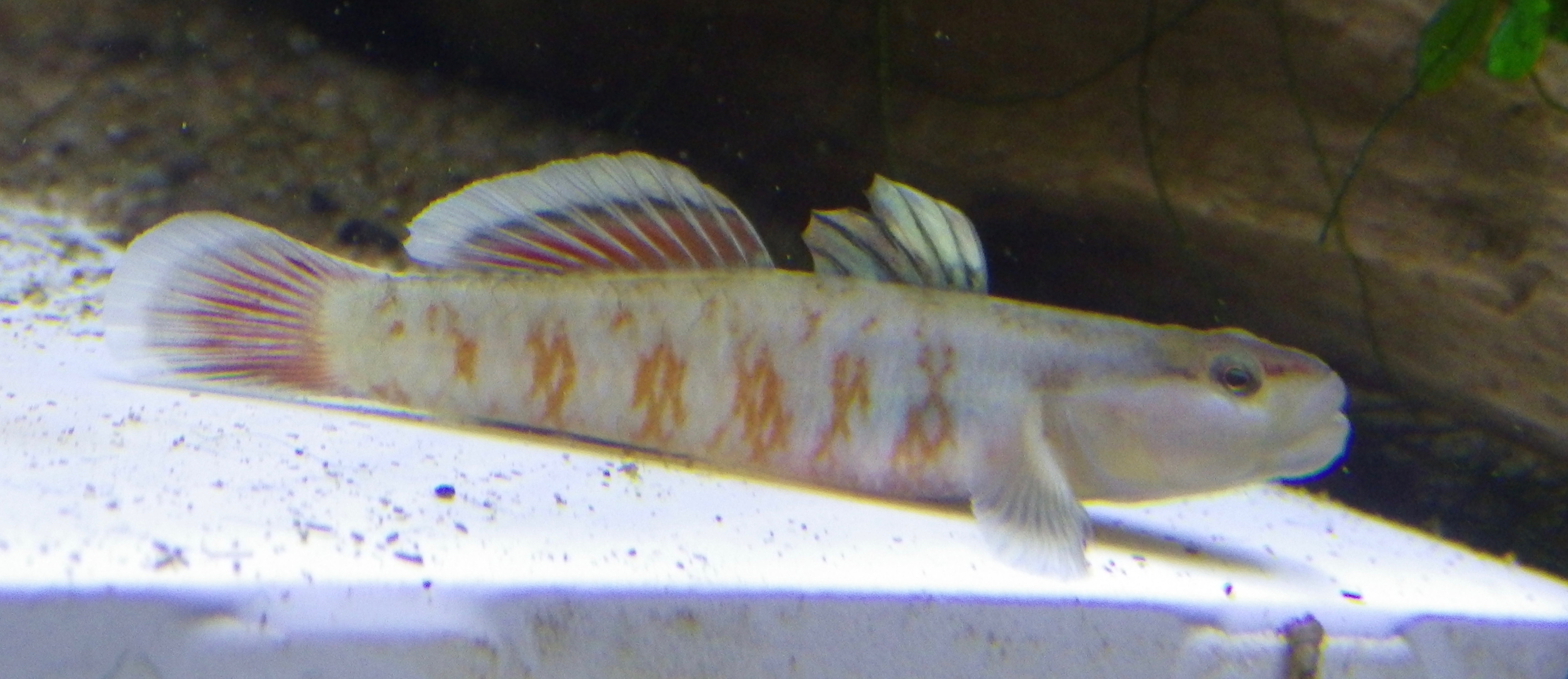

Scientific classification
- Kingdom: Animalia
- Phylum: Chordata
- Class: Actinopterygii
- Order: Gobiiformes
- Family: Oxudercidae
- Genus: Rhinogobius
- Species: R. zhoui

Binomial name
- Rhinogobius zhoui F. Li & J. S. Zhong, 2009

= Rhinogobius zhoui =

Species of fish

Rhinogobius zhoui, known as Zhou's scarlet goby in the aquarium trade, is a species of freshwater goby from the subfamily Gobionellinae which was discovered in a stream on Lianhua Mountain in Haifeng County, Guangdong Province, China. This goby also native in the other part of Guangdong Province and Guangxi Province, for some similar described species，which are called Resemble Zhou's Rhinogobius (类周氏吻虾虎) and New Red Rhinogobius (新红吻虾虎) in China, are found in streams of those places.

Because of the aquarium trade and development, the population from its type locality is endangered now, but the IUCN have not evaluated it, and it is not a protected animal of China.

R. zhoui have become a popular aquarium fish in China, it is called as Zhou's Rhinogobius(周氏吻虾虎) or flame Rhinogobius(火焰吻虾虎) in China, this goby can breed in aquariums.

Rhinogobius zhoui is a bit difficult to keep in aquariums, it needs clean water when it is invited into the aquariums. It can be kept with other gobies such as Rhinogobius wuyanlingensis and Stiphodon spp., but they may attack or eat the fish and shrimps which are too small. They usually make a nest under the stones and live inside of it.

== Etymology ==
The fish is named in honor of Zhou Hang from Shenzhen, Guandong Province, China, who supplied the type specimens and photographs of the fish alive.
