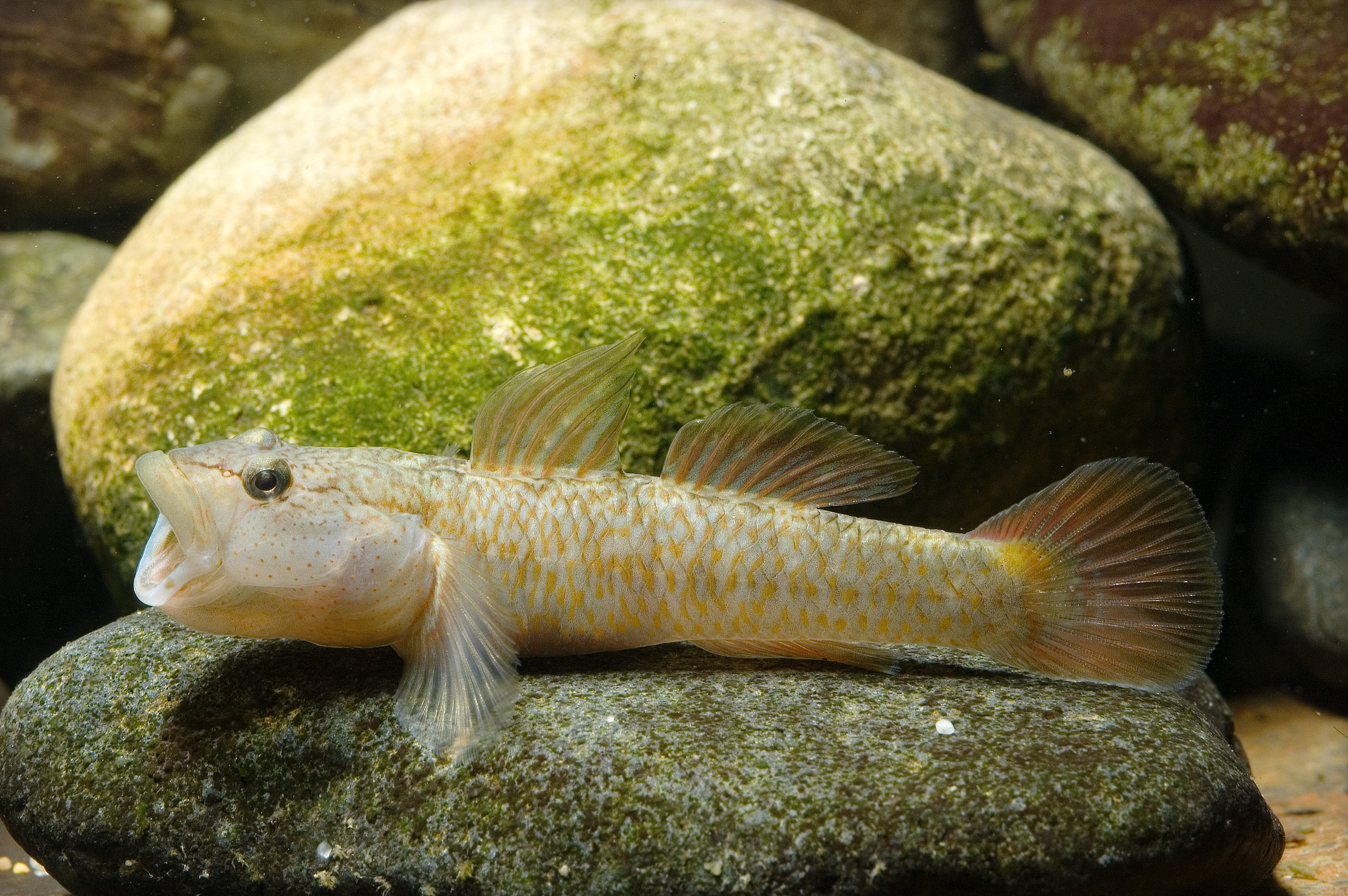

Scientific classification
- Domain: Eukaryota
- Kingdom: Animalia
- Phylum: Chordata
- Class: Actinopterygii
- Order: Gobiiformes
- Family: Oxudercidae
- Genus: Rhinogobius
- Species: R. flumineus

Binomial name
- Rhinogobius flumineus (Mizuno, 1960)

Synonyms
- Tukugobius flumineus Mizuno, 1960

= Rhinogobius flumineus =

Species of goby

Rhinogobius flumineus, commonly known as the lizard goby or kawa-yoshinobori, is a species of goby endemic to Japan where it is found in the mid- to upper reaches of fast-flowing rivers. This species can reach a length of 7 centimetres (2.8 in) TL.

== Taxonomy and evolution ==
This fish was first described in 1960 by the Japanese ichthyologist Nobuhiko Mizuno who gave it the name Tukugobius flumineus. It was later transferred to the genus Rhinogobius, becoming Rhinogobius flumineus. The name comes from the Greek, "rhinos", meaning nose, and the Latin, "gobius", meaning gudgeon; the specific name comes from the Latin "flumen" meaning river. This fish is commonly known as the "lizard goby" or in Japanese as "kawa-yoshinobori". Rhinogobius flumineus seems to have evolved from Rhinogobius brunneus to which it is morphologically very similar. There is a trend for fish in the genus Rhinogobius to move from marine to freshwater habitats as they evolve, and R. brunneus is amphidromous (migratory) while R. flumineus inhabits land-locked river basins.

== Distribution and habitat ==
R. flumineus is endemic to Japan where it is found in riffles and swiftly-flowing mountain streams and small rivers. Its range extends from Shizuoka Prefecture and Toyama Prefecture in Honshu to the westward tip of the island, and the islands of Shikoku and Kyushu. It is a benthic species. Where it coexists with the slightly larger Rhinogobius nagoyae, the latter tends to occupy the riffles that are its favoured habitat, and R. flumineus finds alternative locations.

== Ecology ==
R. flumineus holds itself in a stationary position on a rock in fast-flowing water by means of a "sucker" formed from its two ventral fins. The mouth is slightly asymmetric; dextral fish tend to curve their bodies to the right as they rest while sinistral fish tend to adopt a left-curving posture. The fish are omnivorous, picking edible items of food off the river bed with the side of the mouth, but dextral and sinistral fish have no preference for which side of the mouth they use for this purpose.

The breeding season is from June to August. The eggs are deposited in a nest and guarded by the male, and the newly-hatched juvenile fish live on the riverbed.
