= Rhinogobius aporus =

Conservation status
- Least Concern (IUCN 3.1)

Scientific classification
- Kingdom: Animalia
- Phylum: Chordata
- Class: Actinopterygii
- Order: Gobiiformes
- Family: Oxudercidae
- Genus: Rhinogobius
- Species: R. aporus

Binomial name
- Rhinogobius aporus (J. S. Zhong & H. L. Wu, 1998)

Synonyms
- Pseudorhinogobius aporus Zhong & Wu, 1998

Species of fish

Rhinogobius aporus is a species in the goby subfamily Gobionellinae. It is endemic to China. It was first described as Pseudorhinogobius aporus, but that genus has been brought into synonymy with Rhinogobius.

== Distribution and habitat ==
The type locality of Rhinogobius aporus is a slow-flowing brooklet in the upper Ou River system in Jinyun County, Zhejiang. It is now known from several rivers in southern Zhejiang and northern Fujian provinces, southeastern China.

== Description ==
Rhinogobius aporus is a bottom-dwelling fish. Adult fish measure 2.5–3.5 cm (0.98–1.38 in) SL. Body is moderately elongated and gray brownish in colour, with 7–8 transverse bands above. Pelvic fins are united to form a round sucking disk.
