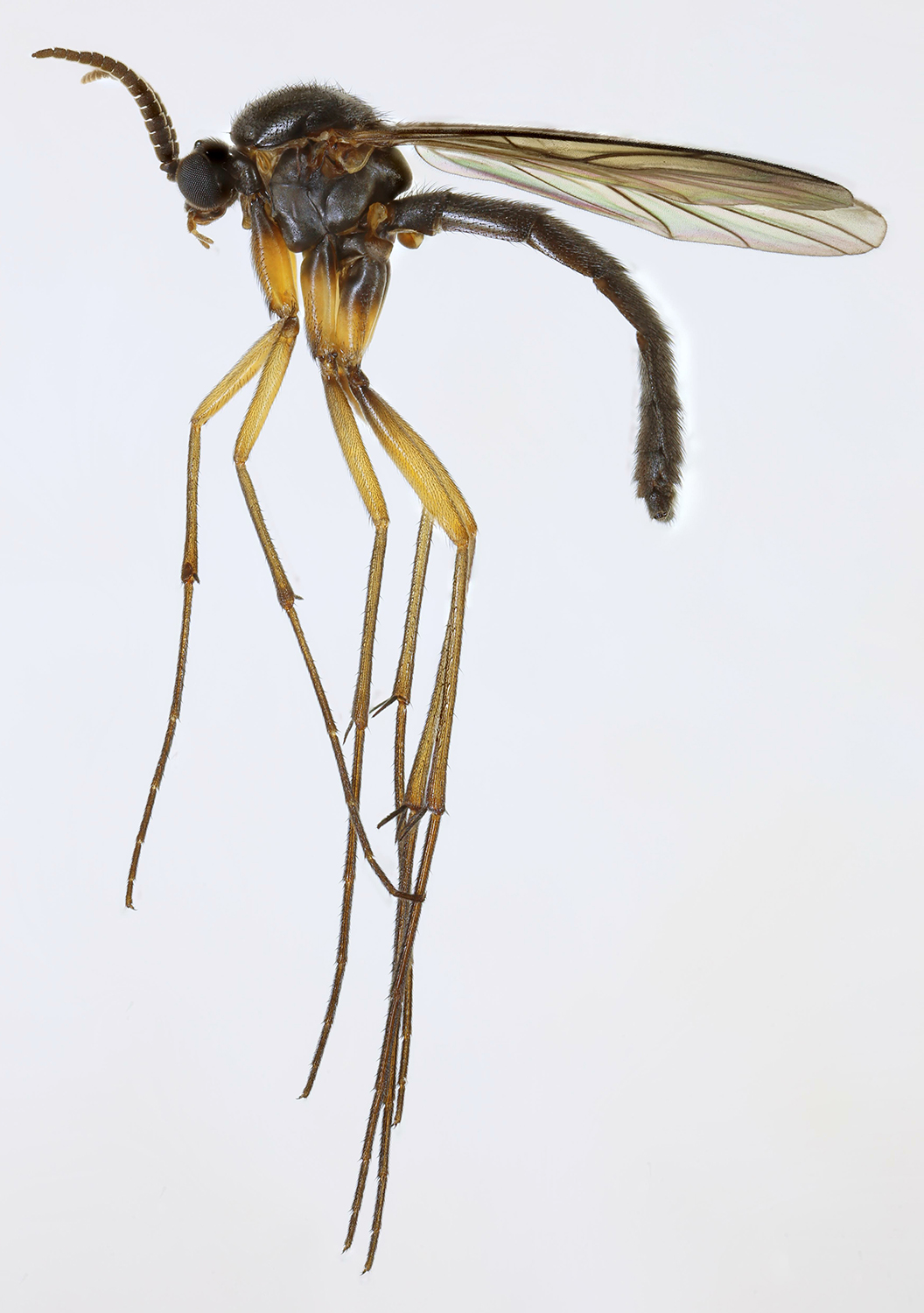
- From North Wales

Scientific classification
- Domain: Eukaryota
- Kingdom: Animalia
- Phylum: Arthropoda
- Class: Insecta
- Order: Diptera
- Family: Keroplatidae
- Genus: Isoneuromyia
- Species: I. semirufa

Binomial name
- Isoneuromyia semirufa (Meigen, 1818)

= Isoneuromyia semirufa =

Species of fly

Isoneuromyia semirufa is a Palearctic species of 'fungus gnat' in the family Mycetophilidae. As larvae, the members of this genus are web spinners that are chiefly associated with dead wood where they feed on fungal hyphae. Aside from turf and grass tussocks, you can also find them in worm tunnels, under logs and boulders, and among mosses and liverworts. They were discovered in 2006 in China: Zhejiang province: Wuyanling National Natural Reserve, Yiping Wang along with 3 Isoneuromyia Isoneuromyia baumhaueri, Isoneuromyia signata and orfelia semirufa

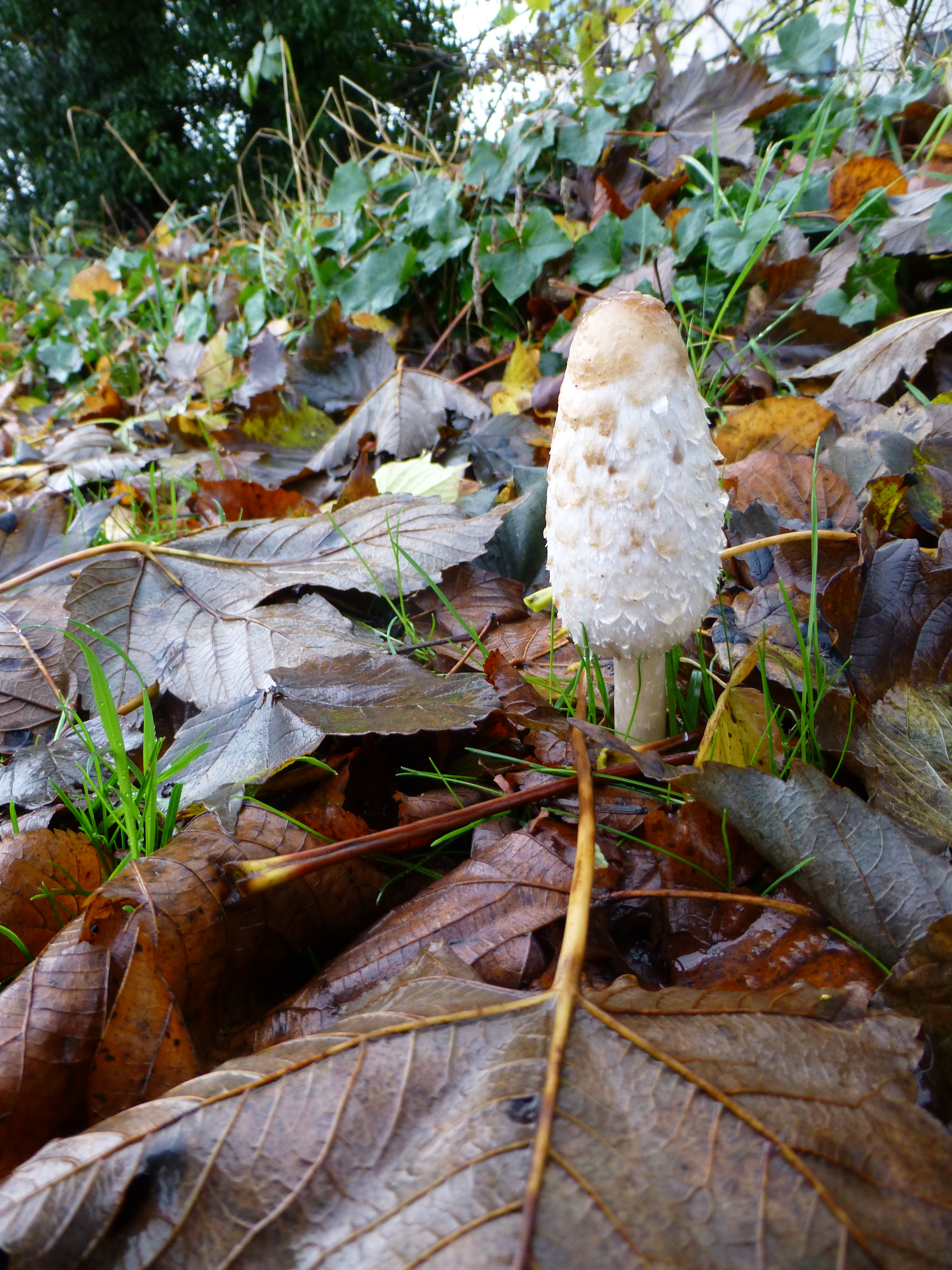
Microhabitat.Ireland.
