= Serica taishun =

Scientific classification
- Kingdom: Animalia
- Phylum: Arthropoda
- Class: Insecta
- Order: Coleoptera
- Suborder: Polyphaga
- Infraorder: Scarabaeiformia
- Family: Scarabaeidae
- Genus: Serica
- Species: S. taishun

Binomial name
- Serica taishun Ahrens, Fabrizi & Liu, 2022

Species of beetle

Serica taishun is a species of beetle of the family Scarabaeidae. It is found in China (Zhejiang province).

== Description ==
Adults reach a length of about 8.2 mm. They have a dark reddish brown, dull, oval body. The elytra have yellow spots and the antennae are yellow. The dorsal surface is almost glabrous, except for some single and short, white setae on the pronotum and elytra.

== Etymology ==
The species name refers to its occurrence close to the city Taishun.
