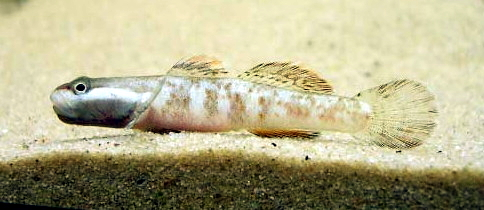
- Rhinogobius duospilus
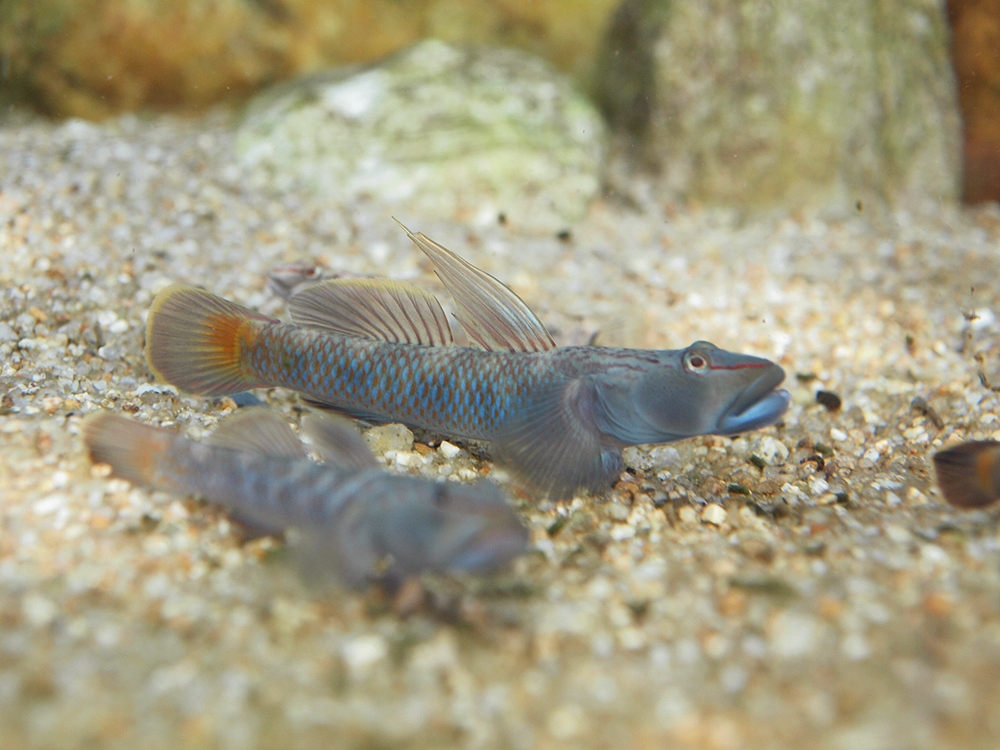
- Rhinogobius brunneus

Scientific classification
- Kingdom: Animalia
- Phylum: Chordata
- Class: Actinopterygii
- Division: Teleostei
- Order: Gobiiformes
- Family: Oxudercidae
- Subfamily: Gobionellinae
- Genus: Rhinogobius; T. N. Gill, 1859

Type species
- Rhinogobius similis T. N. Gill, 1859

Synonyms
- Pseudorhinogobius Zhong & Wu, 1998; Tukugobius Herre, 1927

= Rhinogobius =

Genus of fishes

Rhinogobius is a genus of primarily freshwater gobies in the family Oxudercidae, native to tropical and temperate parts of eastern Asia. Most are small, streamlined in shape, and often sexually dimorphic. Few are of commercial importance, but R. duospilus is fairly widely traded as an aquarium fish.

== Taxonomy ==
=== Species ===
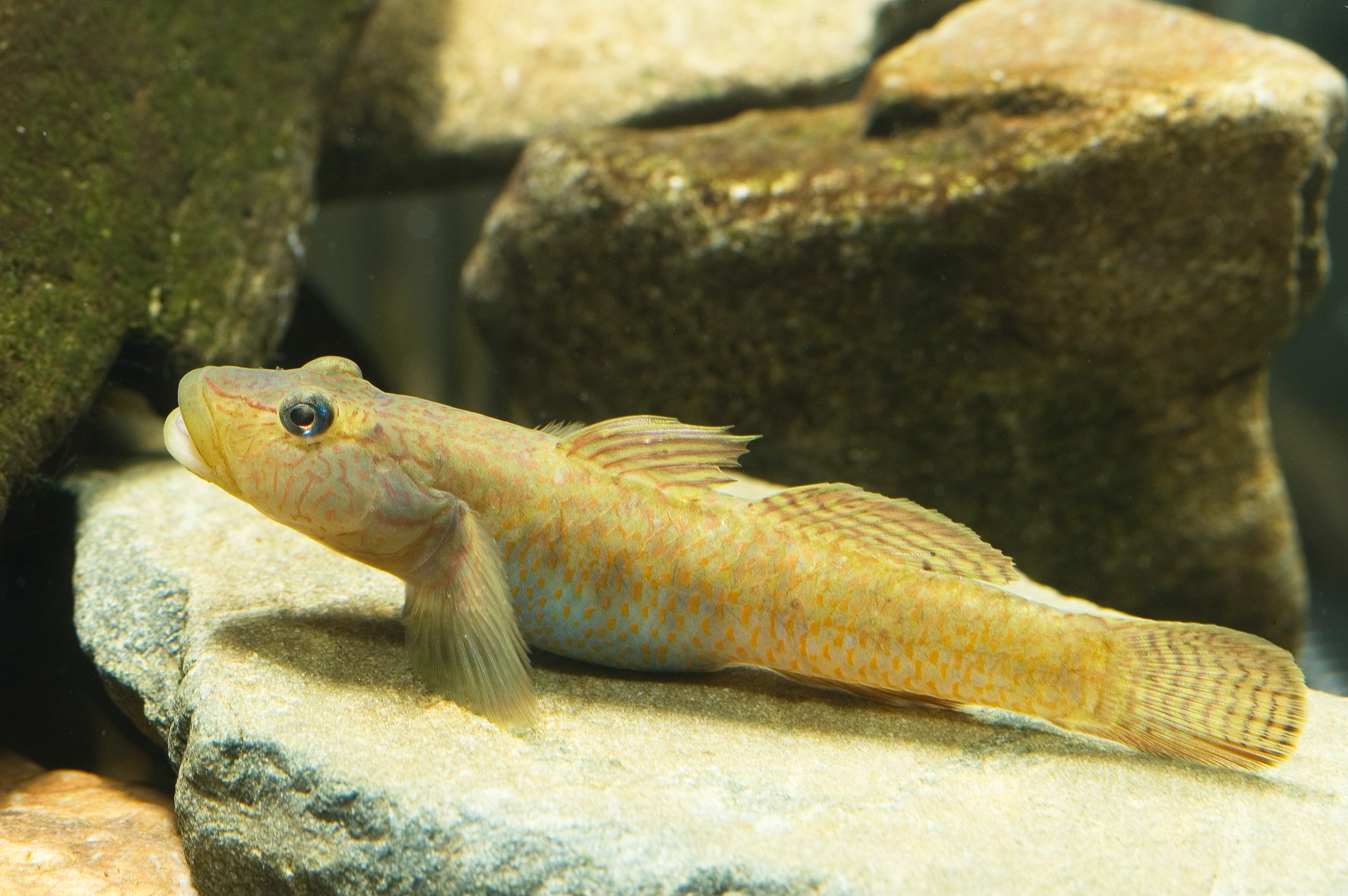
Rhinogobius sp. 'CB' from Hamamatsu, Shizuoka, Japan

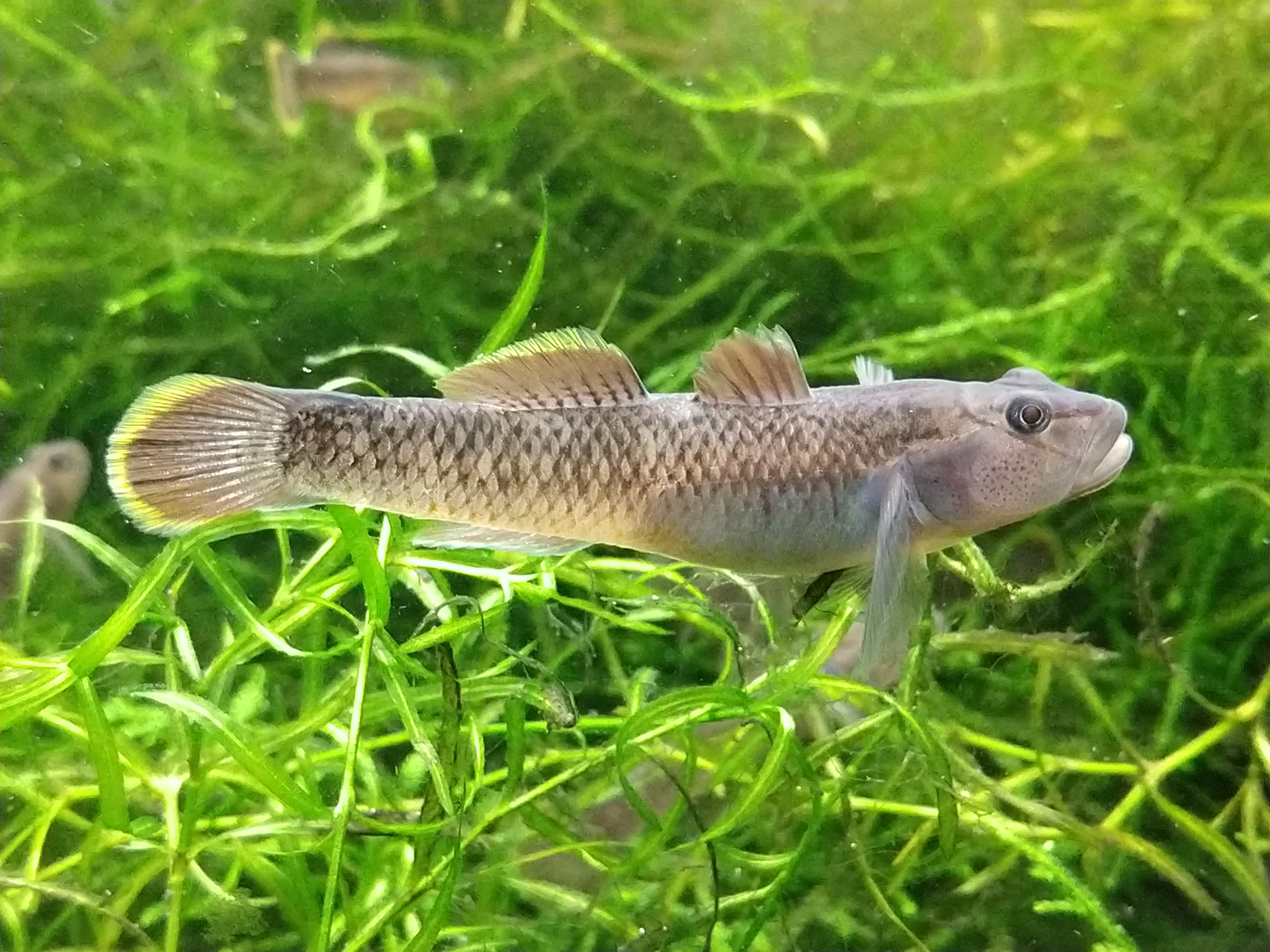
Rhinogobius delicatus, Taiwan

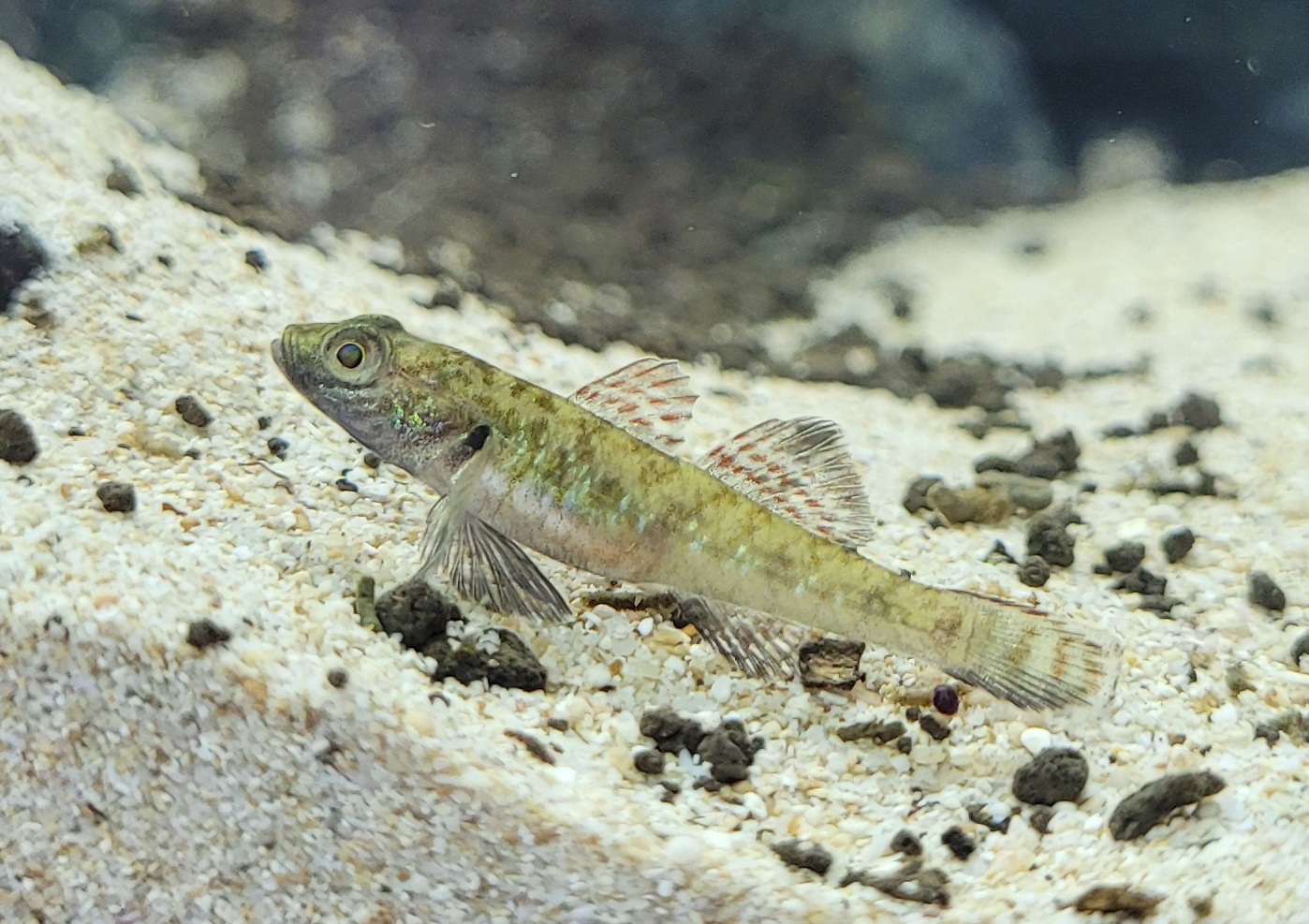
Rhinogobius sp. from Pulangi River, Mindanao, Philippines

These are the currently recognized species in this genus:

- Rhinogobius aonumai,Suzuki,Oseko,Yamasaki,Kimura&Shibukawa, 2022Painukibara-yoshinobori(Japanese)
  - Rhinogobius aonumai aonumai,Suzuki,Oseko,Yamasaki,Kimura&Shibukawa, 2022Iriomote-painukibara-yoshinobori(Japanese)
  - Rhinogobius aonumai ishigakiensis,Suzuki,Oseko,Yamasaki,Kimura&Shibukawa, 2022Ishigaki-painukibara-yoshinobori(Japanese)
- Rhinogobius albimaculatus I. S. Chen, Kottelat & P. J. Miller, 1999
- Rhinogobius aporus (J. S. Zhong & H. L. Wu, 1998)
- Rhinogobius biwaensis Takahashi & Okazaki, 2017
- Rhinogobius boa I. S. Chen & Kottelat, 2005
- Rhinogobius brunneus (Temminck & Schlegel, 1845) (Amur goby)
- Rhinogobius candidianus (Regan, 1908)
- Rhinogobius carpenteri Seale, 1910
- Rhinogobius changjiangensis I. S. Chen, P. J. Miller, H. L. Wu & L. S. Fang, 2002
- Rhinogobius changtinensis S. P. Huang & I. S. Chen, 2007
- Rhinogobius cheni (Nichols, 1931)
- Rhinogobius chiengmaiensis Fowler, 1934 (Chiangmai stream goby)
- Rhinogobius cliffordpopei (Nichols, 1925)
- Rhinogobius davidi (Sauvage & Dabry de Thiersant, 1874)
- Rhinogobius delicatus I. S. Chen & K. T. Shao, 1996
- Rhinogobius duospilus (Herre, 1935)
- Rhinogobius filamentosus (H. W. Wu, 1939)
- Rhinogobius flavoventris Herre, 1927
- Rhinogobius flumineus (Mizuno, 1960)
- Rhinogobius genanematus J. S. Zhong & C. S. Tzeng, 1998
- Rhinogobius gigas Aonuma & I. S. Chen, 1996
- Rhinogobius henchuenensis I. S. Chen & K. T. Shao, 1996
- Rhinogobius henryi (Herre, 1938)
- Rhinogobius honghensis I. S. Chen, J. X. Yang & Y. R. Chen, 1999
- Rhinogobius imfasciocaudatus V. H. Nguyễn & V. B. Vo, 2005
- Rhinogobius kurodai (Tanaka, 1908)
- Rhinogobius lanyuensis I. S. Chen, P. J. Miller & L. S. Fang, 1998
- Rhinogobius leavelli (Herre, 1935)
- Rhinogobius lentiginis (H. L. Wu & M. L. Zheng, 1985)
- Rhinogobius lindbergi L. S. Berg, 1933
- Rhinogobius lineatus I. S. Chen, Kottelat & P. J. Miller, 1999
- Rhinogobius linshuiensis I. S. Chen, P. J. Miller, H. L. Wu & L. S. Fang, 2002
- Rhinogobius lithopolychroma
- Rhinogobius longipinnis V. H. Nguyễn & V. B. Vo, 2005
- Rhinogobius longyanensis I. S. Chen, Y. H. Cheng & K. T. Shao, 2008
- Rhinogobius lungwoensis S. P. Huang & I. S. Chen, 2007
- Rhinogobius maculafasciatus I. S. Chen & K. T. Shao, 1996
- Rhinogobius maculagenys Q. Wu et al. 2018
- Rhinogobius maculicervix I. S. Chen & Kottelat, 2000
- Rhinogobius maxillivirgatus Xia, Wu & Li 2018
- Rhinogobius mengyangensis Liu. X, Chen. ZG, Shu. YF, Huang. JH, Liu. K, Yu. Y, 2026
- Rhinogobius mekongianus (Pellegrin & P. W. Fang, 1940)
- Rhinogobius milleri I. S. Chen & Kottelat, 2001
- Rhinogobius mizunoi T. Suzuki, K. Shibukawa & M. Aizawa, 2017
- Rhinogobius multimaculatus (H. L. Wu & M. L. Zheng, 1985)
- Rhinogobius nagoyae D. S. Jordan & Seale, 1906shima-yoshinobori (Japanese)
  - R. n. formosanus Ōshima, 1919
  - R. n. nagoyae D. S. Jordan & Seale, 1906
- Rhinogobius nami
- Rhinogobius nammaensis I. S. Chen & Kottelat, 2001
- Rhinogobius nandujiangensis I. S. Chen, P. J. Miller, H. L. Wu & L. S. Fang, 2002
- Rhinogobius nantaiensis Aonuma & I. S. Chen, 1996
- Rhinogobius niger S. P. Huang, I. S. Chen & K. T. Shao, 2016
- Rhinogobius ogasawaraensis T. Suzuki, I. S. Chen & Senou, 2011
- Rhinogobius parvus (W. Y. Luo, 1989)
- Rhinogobius perpusillus Seale, 1910
- Rhinogobius ponkouensis S. P. Huang & I. S. Chen, 2007
- Rhinogobius reticulatus F. Li, J. S. Zhong & H. L. Wu, 2007
- Rhinogobius rong
- Rhinogobius rubrolineatus I. S. Chen & P. J. Miller, 2008
- Rhinogobius rubromaculatus S. C. Lee & J. T. Chang, 1996
- Rhinogobius sagittus I. S. Chen & P. J. Miller, 2008
- Rhinogobius sangenloensis I. S. Chen & P. J. Miller, 2013
- Rhinogobius similis T. N. Gill, 1859
- Rhinogobius sowerbyi Ginsburg, 1917
- Rhinogobius sudoccidentalis
- Rhinogobius sulcatus I. S. Chen & Kottelat, 2005
- Rhinogobius szechuanensis (T. L. Tchang, 1939)
- Rhinogobius taenigena I. S. Chen, Kottelat & P. J. Miller, 1999
- Rhinogobius telma (Suzuki, Kimura & Shibukawa, 2019)
- Rhinogobius tyoni (Suzuki, Kimura & Shibukawa, 2019)
- Rhinogobius variolatus I. S. Chen & Kottelat, 2005
- Rhinogobius vermiculatus I. S. Chen & Kottelat, 2001
- Rhinogobius virgigena I. S. Chen & Kottelat, 2005
- Rhinogobius wangchuangensis I. S. Chen, P. J. Miller, H. L. Wu & L. S. Fang, 2002
- Rhinogobius wangi I. S. Chen & L. S. Fang, 2006
- Rhinogobius wuyanlingensis J. Q. Yang, H. L. Wu & I. S. Chen, 2008
- Rhinogobius wuyiensis F. Li & J. S. Zhong, 2007
- Rhinogobius xianshuiensis I. S. Chen, H. L. Wu & K. T. Shao, 1999
- Rhinogobius yaima (Suzuki, Oseko, Kimura & Shibukawa, 2020)Yaimahira-yoshinobori (Japanese)
- Rhinogobius yaoshanensis (W. Y. Luo, 1989)
- Rhinogobius yonezawai (Suzuki, Oseko, Kimura & Shibukawa, 2020)Kenmunhira-yoshinobori (Japanese)
- Rhinogobius zhoui F. Li & J. S). Zhong, 2009

In addition, there are four undescribed species in Japan awaiting further study:

- Rhinogobius sp. 'BB' "Blue Belly" Aobara-yoshinobori (Japanese)
- Rhinogobius sp. 'KZ' Kazusa-yoshinobori (Japanese)
- Rhinogobius sp. 'OM' Oumi-yoshinobori (Japanese)
- Rhinogobius sp. 'OR' Tou-yoshinobori (Japanese)
- Rhinogobius sp. 'MO' "Mosaic" Aya-yoshinobori (Japanese)
- Rhinogobius sp. 'YB' "Yellow Belly" – Kibara-yoshinobori (Japanese)
