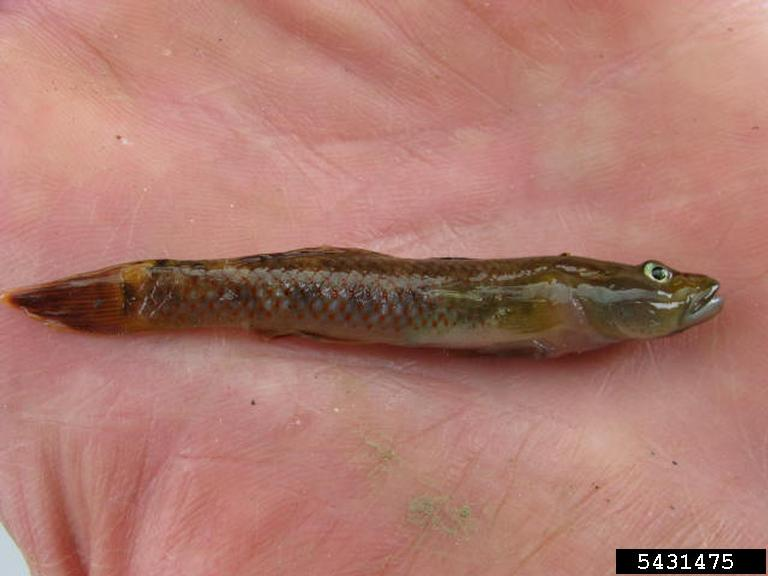
- Adult amur goby

Scientific classification
- Domain: Eukaryota
- Kingdom: Animalia
- Phylum: Chordata
- Class: Actinopterygii
- Order: Gobiiformes
- Family: Oxudercidae
- Genus: Rhinogobius
- Species: R. similis

Binomial name
- Rhinogobius similis T. N. Gill, 1859

Synonyms
- Gobius similis (T. N. Gill, 1859); Tukugobius philippinus Herre, 1927

= Amur goby =

Species of fish

The Amur goby (Rhinogobius similis) is a species of fresh water goby native to Japan and China, and widely introduced in several central Asian countries, where it has been reported as negatively impacted the local ecology. This species can reach 10 cm (3.9 in) in total length.
