= Rhinogobius wuyanlingensis =

Scientific classification
- Kingdom: Animalia
- Phylum: Chordata
- Class: Actinopterygii
- Order: Gobiiformes
- Family: Oxudercidae
- Genus: Rhinogobius
- Species: R. wuyanlingensis

Binomial name
- Rhinogobius wuyanlingensis J. Q. Yang, H. L. Wu & I. S. Chen, 2008

Species of fish

Rhinogobius wuyanlingensis is a freshwater goby native to Wuyanling National Nature Reserve in Zhejiang Province, China. It is probably endemic to the upper reaches of the Feiyun River Basin.

Rhinogobius wuyanlingensis measure 2.8–3.1 cm (1.1–1.2 in) in standard length.
