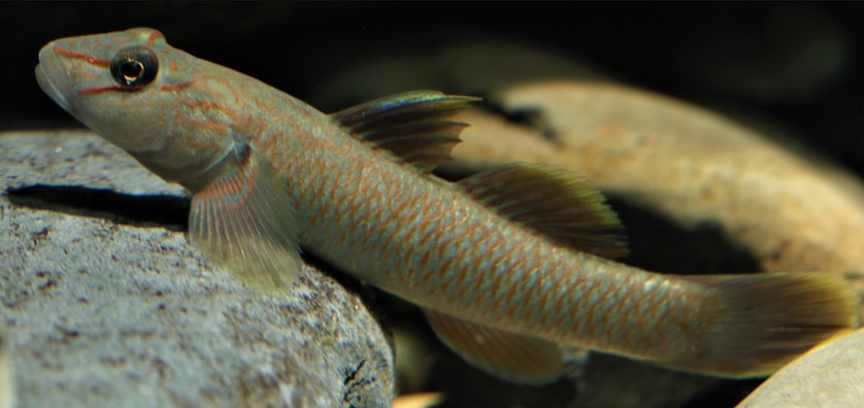

Scientific classification
- Kingdom: Animalia
- Phylum: Chordata
- Class: Actinopterygii
- Division: Teleostei
- Order: Gobiiformes
- Family: Oxudercidae
- Genus: Rhinogobius
- Species: R. candidianus

Binomial name
- Rhinogobius candidianus (Regan, 1908)

Synonyms
- Ctenogobius candidianus Regan, 1908; Rhinogobius candidius (Regan, 1908); Rhinogobius taiwanus Ōshima, 1919

= Rhinogobius candidianus =

Species of fish

Rhinogobius candidianus is a species of freshwater goby. It is endemic to Taiwan.

== Etymology ==
The specific name candidianus refers to the type locality, Lake Candidius. However, the species does not occur in the lake itself, but rather in the nearby rivers.

== Description ==
Rhinogobius candidianus can grow to 7.8 cm (3.1 in) standard length. The body is elongated, compressed posteriorly. The head is depressed with an obtuse snout tip. The pelvic fins are united to a rounded sucking disc. Body coloration is yellow or dark brownish. There can be 6–7 indistinct blotches on side; some adults have blue spots.

== Distribution and population structure ==
Rhinogobius candidianus is widely distributed in Taiwan. However, genetic data indicate that populations in the east and south of the island are likely resulting from introductions. Furthermore, genetic data show high population differentiation among the native populations, suggesting that this species has limited ability to disperse from one water course to another through the sea.

Some sources suggest that this species also occurs in China, but there is no evidence supporting this.

== Habitat and ecology ==
Rhinogobius candidianus occurs only in lotic habitats. In the headwaters of Tamsui River, it is associated with microhabitats with large boulders and cobbles. It is omnivorous and feeds primarily on filamentous algae, insects, and detritus; another study characterizes its diet as mainly consisting of aquatic insects and macroinvertebrates (including freshwater crabs).
