= Nanxi River (Zhejiang) =

Nanxi River Nánxī Jiāng (Pinyin)
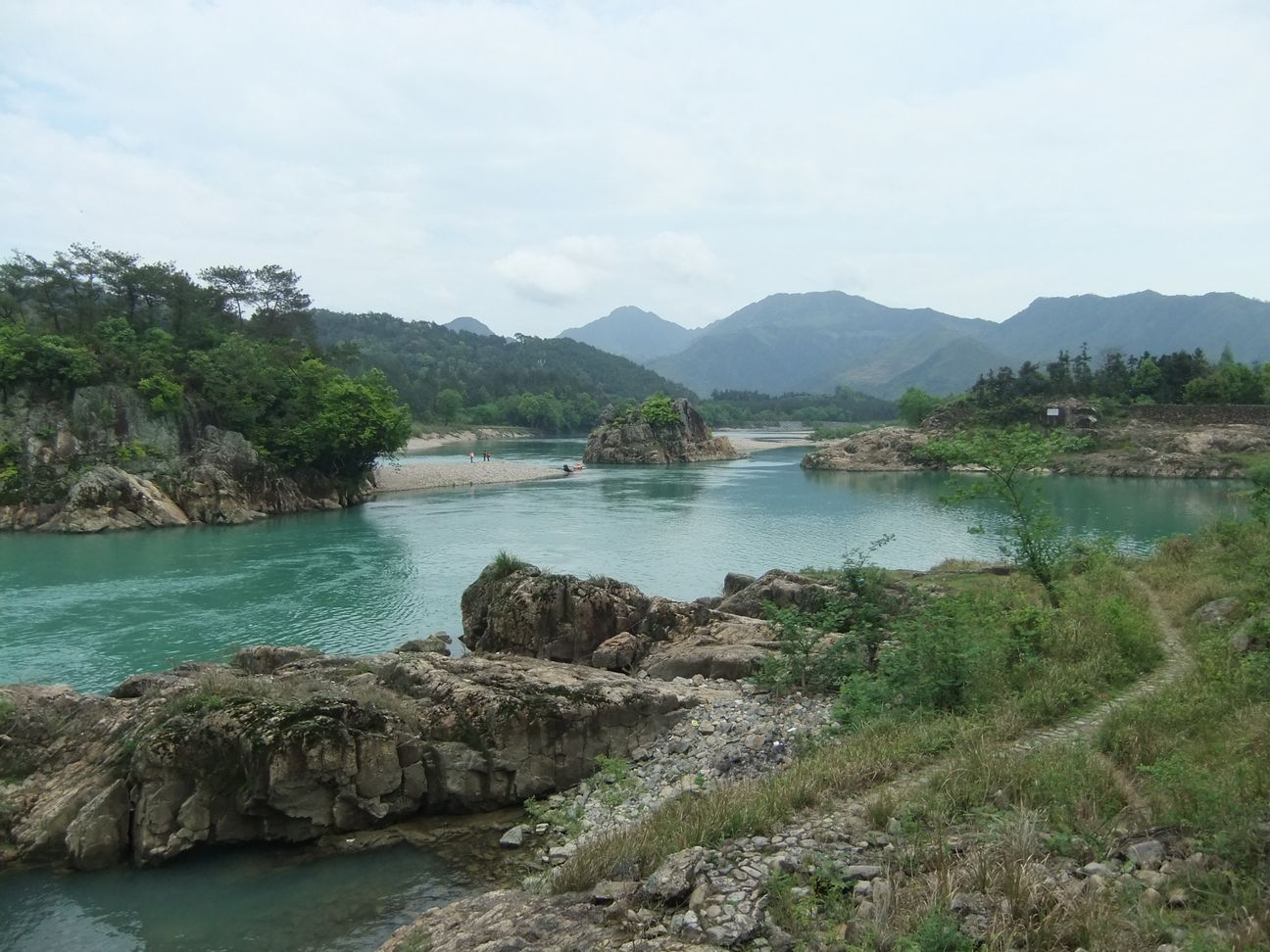
- Native name: 楠溪江 (Chinese)

Location
- Country: China

Physical characteristics
- Source: Danan Brook
- 2nd source: Yantan Brook
- Source confluence
  - location: Yongjia, Wenzhou, Zhejiang, China
  - coordinates: 28°25′33.9″N 120°43′10.9″E
- Mouth: Ou River
  - location: Wenzhou, Zhejiang, China
  - coordinates: 28°02′17.3″N 120°40′22.6″E
- Length: 140 km (87 mi)
- Basin size: 2,420 km^{2} (930 sq mi)

Basin features
- Tributaries
  - left: Donggao Brook
  - right: Xiaonan Brook

The Nanxi River (Chinese: 楠溪江; pinyin: Nánxī Jiāng) is located in Yongjia County, Wenzhou, Zhejiang Province in eastern China, and is a major tributary of the Ou River. The Nanxi River is 150 kilometers long and has a drainage area of 2429 square kilometers. It runs from north to south and flows into the Ou River, which empties into the East China Sea. The Nanxi River has 36 bends and 72 beaches.

== Scenic area ==
The Nanxi River Scenic Area (楠溪江景区) was named a National Tourist Scenic Spot by the State Council in 1988 due to its scenic landscape accompanied by its unique local culture. It is 23 kilometres from Wenzhou, east of the Yandang Mountains, north of Xianju County and west of Xiandu County. The main scenic spots of the Nanxi River area include Baizhang Waterfall, Furong Triangle Rock, the Waterfall of Tengxi Pool, the Twelve Peaks, Taogong Cave, the Warehouse Under The Cliff, the Furong Ancient Hamlet and Lion Rock. The rock stratum of the mountains is mostly made up of tuff, rhyolite, and granite.

Drifting in the Nanxi River is the hottest activity. People sit on a bamboo catamaran which drifts rapidly with the current. From the raft, views of the ancient village, remote foggy mountains and locals washing along the river can be seen. The locals transport wood from the forest by means of the river. The wood is floated from the upper reaches and retrieved in the lower reach of the river.

The area was added to UNESCO's World Heritage Tentative List on November 29, 2001 in the Mixed (Cultural & Natural) category.

== Climate ==
The river is located in the subtropical monsoon zone and is influenced by a maritime climate. The climate is warm and moist year round. Temperatures vary from 4.2 to 38.2 °C (39.6 to 100.8 °F). The average annual temperature is 18.2 °C (64.8 °F).
