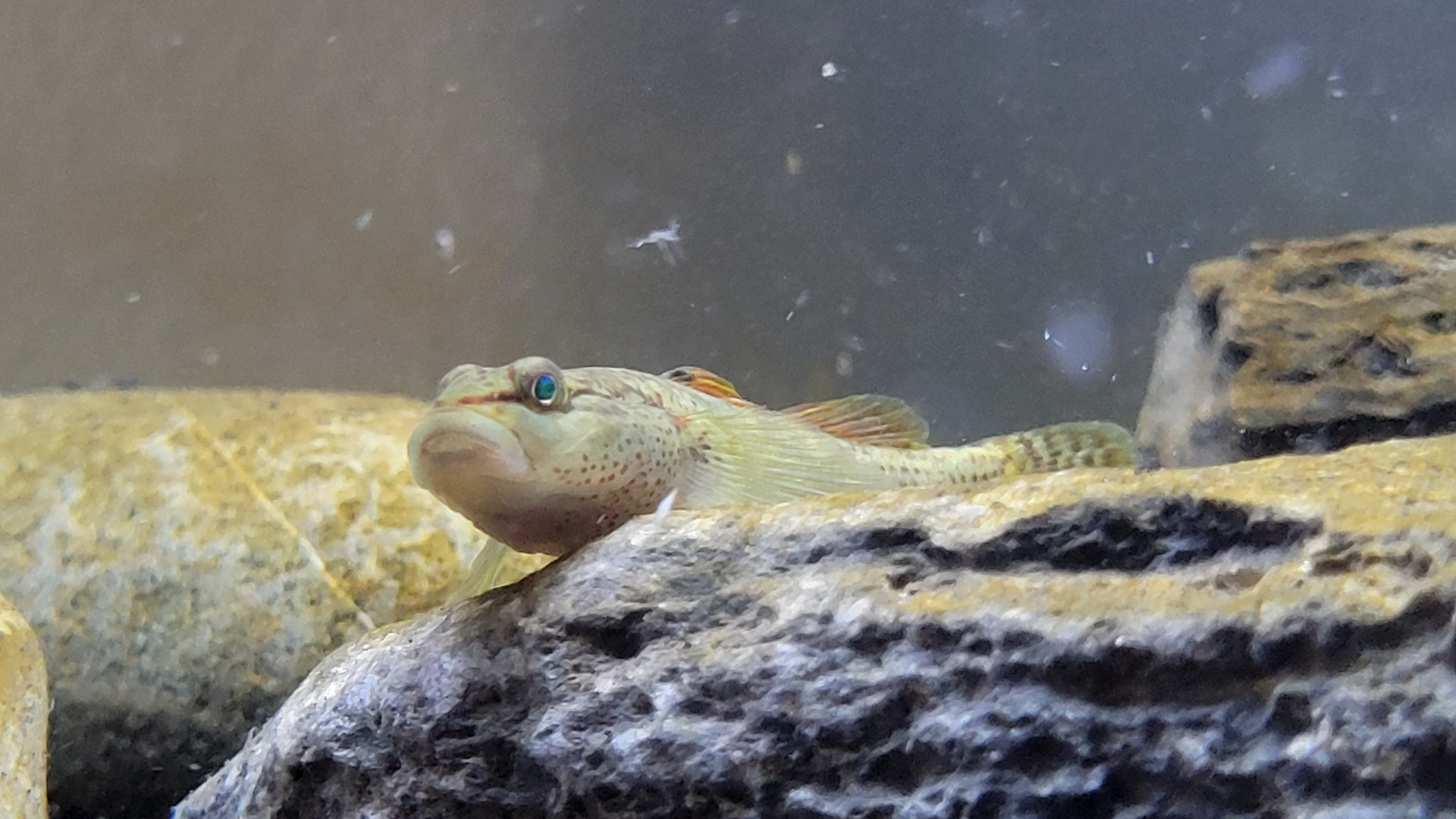
- A captive R. niger specimen in a home aquarium

Scientific classification
- Kingdom: Animalia
- Phylum: Chordata
- Class: Actinopterygii
- Order: Gobiiformes
- Family: Oxudercidae
- Genus: Rhinogobius
- Species: R. niger

Binomial name
- Rhinogobius niger S. P. Huang, I. S. Chen & K. T. Shao (2016): A new species of Rhinogobius (Teleostei: Gobiidae) from Zhejiang Province, China. Ichthyological Research, 63 (4): 470-479.

= Rhinogobius niger =

Species of fish

Rhinogobius niger is a small benthic species in the goby subfamily Gobionellinae endemic to Zhejiang Province, China. It was discovered in 2002 and scientifically described and assigned a binomial taxonomic name in 2016.

== Description ==
Rhinogobius niger is a freshwater benthic fish with united pelvic fins that form a sucking disk. It can be distinguished from its congeners by its lack of a cheek stripe, and by two horizontal reddish brown stripes running front to back on the head just behind the eyes. Additionally, males have small reddish orange spots as adults, and all R. niger have a large black mark on the first dorsal fin. Adult fish measure 28.3–42.3 mm (1.1–2.7 in) SL.

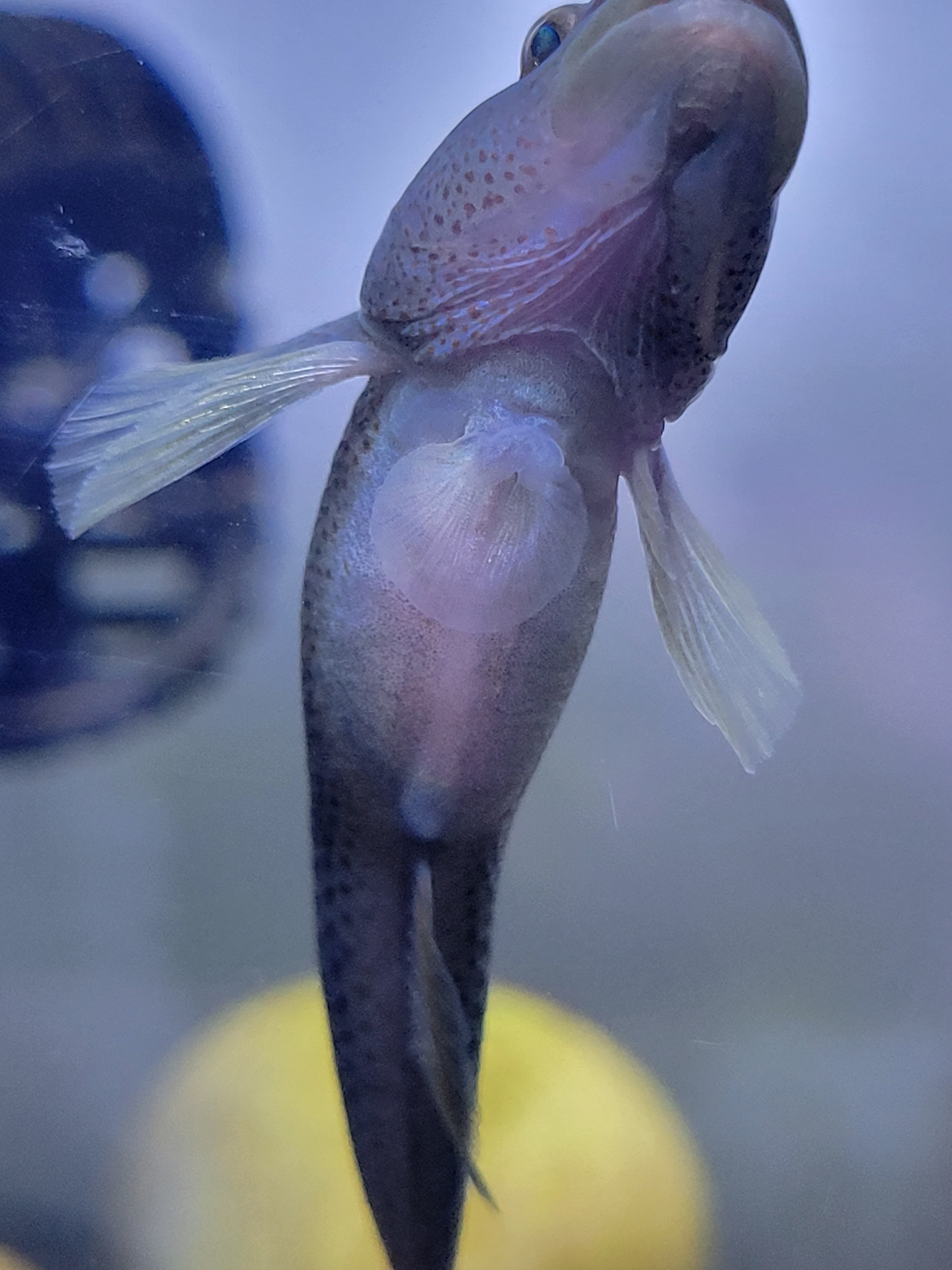
The underside of a R. niger specimen in captivity. The sucking disk formed by its pectoral fins is clearly visible.

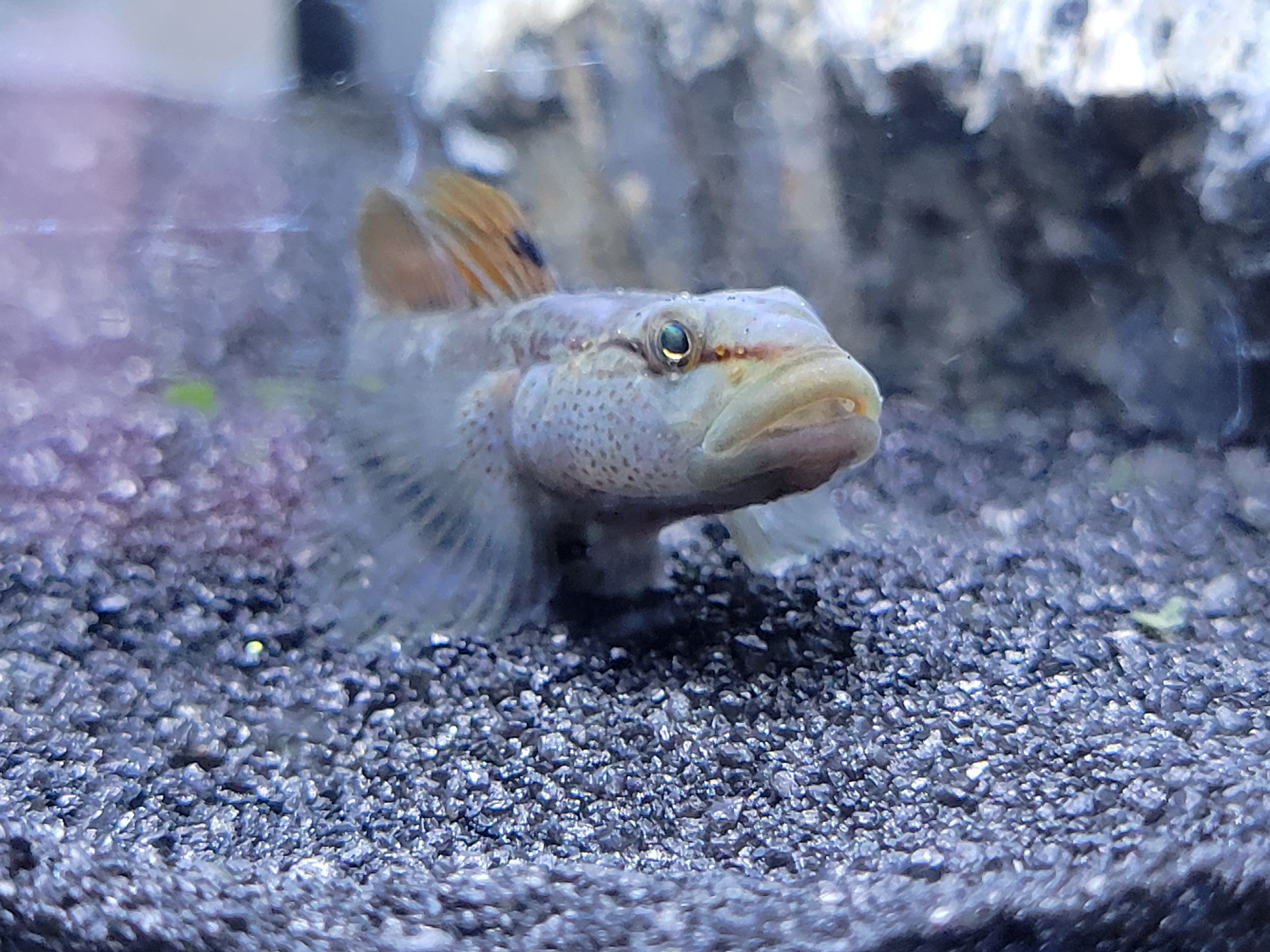
A close up shot of the head of a captive Rhinogobius niger.

== Distribution ==
The type locality of Rhinogobius niger is from the Yong’an Brook, a tributary of the Ling River, Pan’an County, Zhejiang Province, China.
