= Rhinogobius lanyuensis =

Scientific classification
- Kingdom: Animalia
- Phylum: Chordata
- Class: Actinopterygii
- Order: Gobiiformes
- Family: Oxudercidae
- Genus: Rhinogobius
- Species: R. lanyuensis

Binomial name
- Rhinogobius lanyuensis I. S. Chen, P. J. Miller & L. S. Fang, 1998

Species of fish

Rhinogobius lanyuensis is a species of freshwater goby endemic to Taiwan and only found on Orchid Island (=Lanyu, the type locality) and Green Island, off the southeastern coast of Taiwan. Fishbase also lists it from "China".

Rhinogobius lanyuensis grows to 6.7 cm (2.6 in). It has not been evaluated by IUCN but is classified as "near threatened" in the 2012 Redlist of Fresh Water Fishes of Taiwan.
