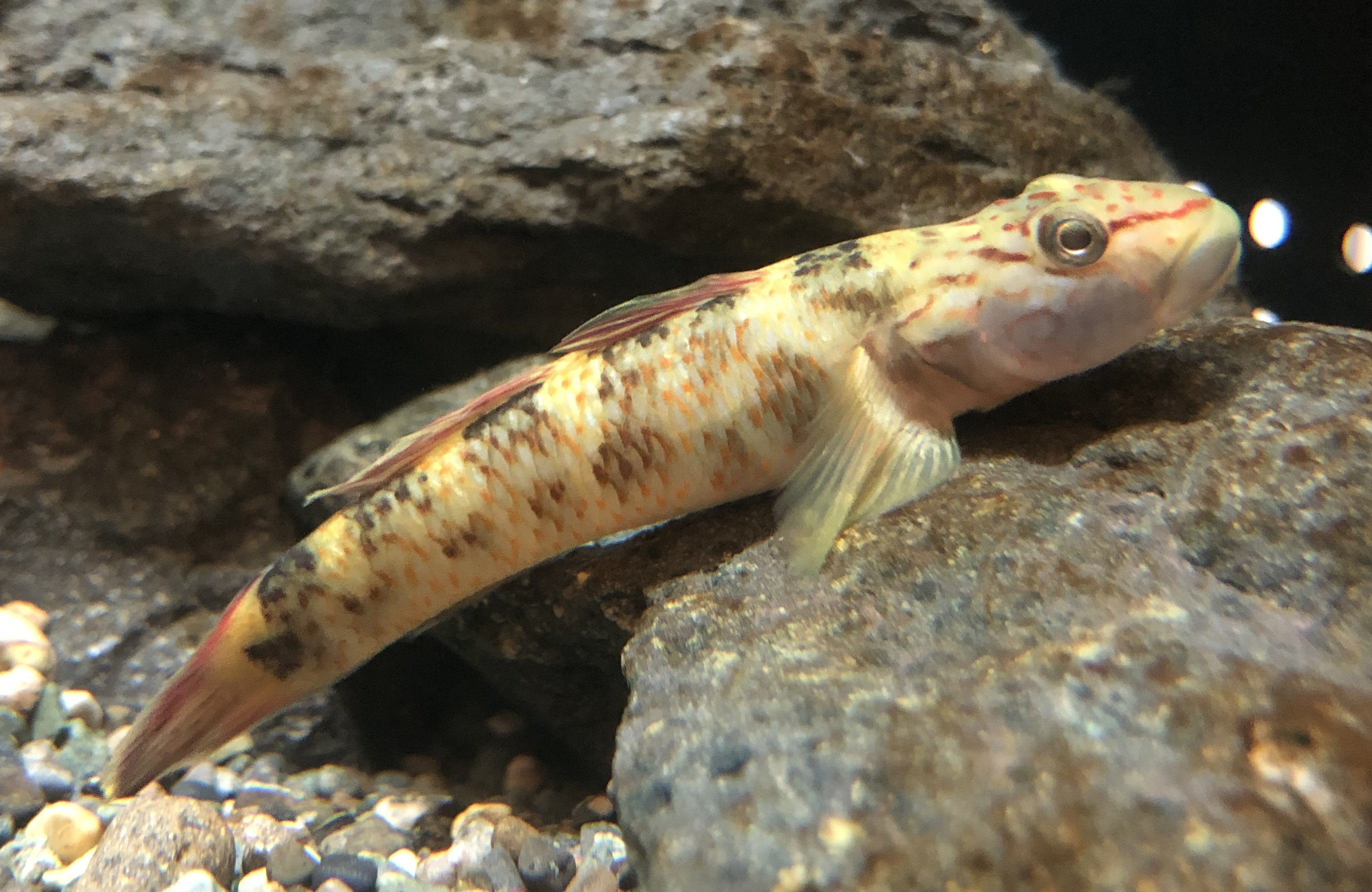

Scientific classification
- Kingdom: Animalia
- Phylum: Chordata
- Class: Actinopterygii
- Order: Gobiiformes
- Family: Oxudercidae
- Genus: Rhinogobius
- Species: R. mizunoi

Binomial name
- Rhinogobius mizunoi T. Suzuki, K. Shibukawa & M. Aizawa, 2017

= Rhinogobius mizunoi =

Species of fish

Rhinogobius mizunoi is a species of fish in the family Oxudercidae. It is found in freshwater streams in Shizuoka Prefecture, Japan.

== Description ==
This species reaches a length of 6.72 cm (2.65 in).

== Etymology ==
The fish is named in honor of Nobuhiko Mizuno, former professor of Ehime University (Japan), for his contribution to the knowledge of the ecology of freshwater fishes in Japan, particularly gobies in the genus Rhinogobius.
