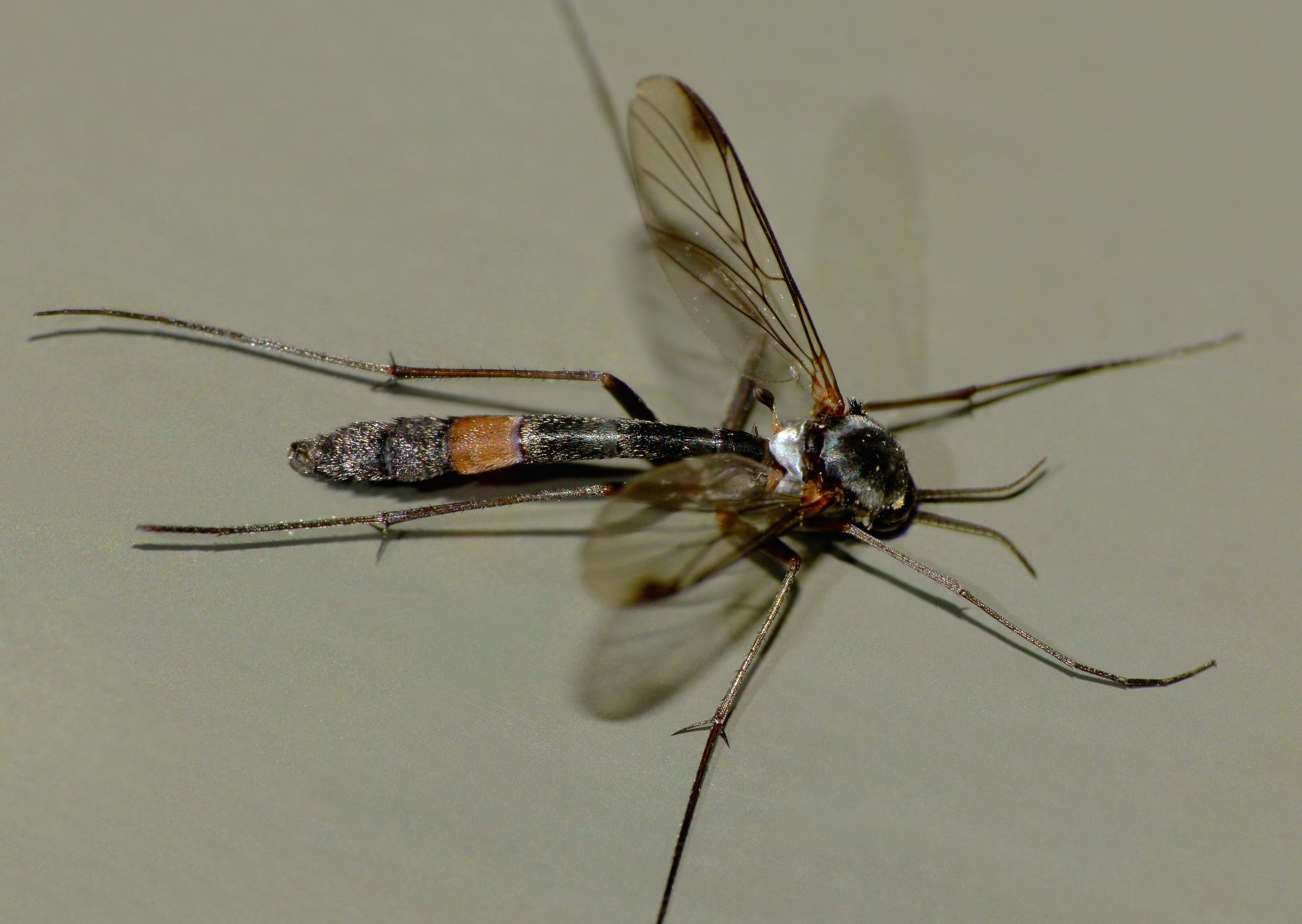
- Isoneuromyia harrisi

Scientific classification
- Domain: Eukaryota
- Kingdom: Animalia
- Phylum: Arthropoda
- Class: Insecta
- Order: Diptera
- Family: Keroplatidae
- Genus: Isoneuromyia; Brunetti, 1912

= Isoneuromyia =

Genus of flies

Isoneuromyia is a genus of flies belonging to the family Keroplatidae. The genus has an almost cosmopolitan distribution.

== Species ==
The following species are recognised in the genus Isoneuromyia:

- Isoneuromyia annandalei Brunetti, 1912
- Isoneuromyia argenteotomentosa (Kertész, 1909)
- Isoneuromyia atra (Lane, 1948)
- Isoneuromyia bicingulata (Edwards, 1940)
- Isoneuromyia borinqueni (Lane, 1950)
- Isoneuromyia (Platyura) brevinervus (Shaw, 1940)
- Isoneuromyia brunettii Evenhuis, 2006
- Isoneuromyia comosa Ostroverkhova, 1979
- Isoneuromyia completa Xu, Cao & Evenhuis, 2007
- Isoneuromyia czernyi (Strobl, 1909)
- Isoneuromyia daisenana (Okada, 1938)
- Isoneuromyia elegantissma (Tollet, 1950)
- Isoneuromyia elegantula (Williston, 1900)
- Isoneuromyia falcaoi Lane, 1961
- Isoneuromyia flava Evenhuis, 2006
- Isoneuromyia flavofasciata (Edwards, 1940)
- Isoneuromyia forcipata (Kertész, 1909)
- Isoneuromyia formosana (Okada, 1938)
- Isoneuromyia glabra Evenhuis, 2006
- Isoneuromyia goianensis (Lane, 1948)
- Isoneuromyia grandis (Brunetti, 1912)
- Isoneuromyia griseofasciata (Edwards, 1933)
- Isoneuromyia harrisi (Tonnoir, 1927)
- Isoneuromyia icomi Lane, 1959
- Isoneuromyia jata Evenhuis, 2006
- Isoneuromyia lenkoi Lane, 1961
- Isoneuromyia lopesi Lane, 1950
- Isoneuromyia lutea (Freeman, 1951)
- Isoneuromyia magna (Walker, 1848)
- Isoneuromyia matilei Evenhuis, 2006
- Isoneuromyia mexicanus Lane, 1948
- Isoneuromyia mimula (Johannsen, 1910)
- Isoneuromyia nigerrima Evenhuis, 2006
- Isoneuromyia nigribasis Evenhuis, 2006
- Isoneuromyia nigrofasciata (Freeman, 1951)
- Isoneuromyia novaezelandiae (Tonnoir, 1927)
- Isoneuromyia pallidopsis Evenhuis, 2006
- Isoneuromyia palmi (Shaw, 1951)
- Isoneuromyia paulistana (Lane, 1948)
- Isoneuromyia polybioides (Edwards, 1933)
- Isoneuromyia pulcherrima (Tollet, 1950)
- Isoneuromyia ramizi (Khalaf, 1971)
- Isoneuromyia rufescens Brunetti, 1912
- Isoneuromyia semirufa (Meigen, 1818)
- Isoneuromyia sesiformis (Edwards, 1940)
- Isoneuromyia singula Xu, Cao & Evenhuis, 2007
- Isoneuromyia sinica Xu, Cao & Evenhuis, 2007
- Isoneuromyia splendida Evenhuis, 2006
- Isoneuromyia subapicalis Evenhuis, 2006
- Isoneuromyia tannia Evenhuis, 2006
- Isoneuromyia timbira Lane, 1956
- Isoneuromyia townsendi Lane, 1948
- Isoneuromyia tucumana Lane, 1958
- Isoneuromyia variabilis Evenhuis, 2006
- Isoneuromyia vitripennis (Meigen, 1830)
- Isoneuromyia wolongensis Xu, Cao & Evenhuis, 2007
- Isoneuromyia xanthina (Edwards, 1931)
- Isoneuromyia xanthocera (Edwards, 1931)
- Isoneuromyia yorki Evenhuis, 2006
- BOLD:ADS8974 (Isoneuromyia sp.)
- BOLD:ADU4719 (Isoneuromyia sp.)
