= Ou River (Zhejiang) =

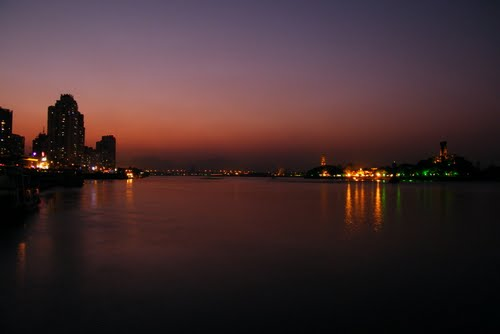

- Location of the mouth Ou River (Zhejiang) (China)
- Native name: Oujiang (Chinese)

Location
- Country: China
- District: Zhejiang

Physical characteristics
- Source: Daxi Brook
- Mouth: Wenzhou Bay (East China Sea)
  - location: Wenzhou, Zhejiang, China
  - coordinates: 27°55′10.8″N 120°54′00.8″E
- Length: 388 km (241 mi)
- Basin size: 18,028 km^{2} (6,961 sq mi)
- Discharge
  - average: 640.1 m^{3}/s (22,600 cu ft/s)

Basin features
- Tributaries
  - left: Ruxi Brook, Xixi Brook, Nanxi River
  - right: Xupu River

The Ou River (simplified Chinese: 瓯江; traditional Chinese: 甌江; pinyin: Ōujiāng) or Oujiang is the second-largest river in the Zhejiang province of eastern China. The river flows 388 kilometers (241 mi) before finally reaching the city of Wenzhou and emptying into the East China Sea, into which it discharges 20.2 billion cubic meters (710×10^{9} cu ft) of water annually. Shen Jiang (慎江; 'Cautious River'), Jiang Yongjia (永嘉江), and Wenjiang (温江; 'Warm River') are all former names for this river.

== Fauna ==
The Ou River has a rich fish fauna. A 2010 survey recorded 60 different fish species, with goldfish, bagrid catfish, and Pseudobagrus tenuis being the most prolific in range. (Note: These three species were recorded at all monitoring stations.) Compared to a 1972 survey, 20 new species were recorded, including two alien species (Mozambique tilapia and largemouth bass); however, 34 species recorded in 1972 were absent in 2010, and overall fish density was lower.

Goby Pseudorhinogobius aporus is endemic to the Ou River system: it is only known from a brook in the upper Ou River system.
