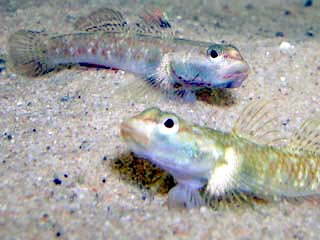

Scientific classification
- Domain: Eukaryota
- Kingdom: Animalia
- Phylum: Chordata
- Class: Actinopterygii
- Order: Gobiiformes
- Family: Oxudercidae
- Genus: Rhinogobius
- Species: R. duospilus

Binomial name
- Rhinogobius duospilus (Herre, 1935)

Synonyms
- Ctenogobius duospilus Herre, 1935; Gobius duospilus (Herre, 1935); Gobius whitleyi Herre, 1936; Ctenogobius wui C. K. Liu, 1940; Rhinogobius wui (C. K. Liu, 1940)

= Rhinogobius duospilus =

Species of fish

Rhinogobius duospilus is a species of goby native to China and Vietnam where they can be found in fresh or brackish waters. This species can reach a length of 4.5 centimetres (1.8 in) TL. In their natural environment these fish consume larvae or other similar creatures, but they can be fed brine shrimp or blood worms.
