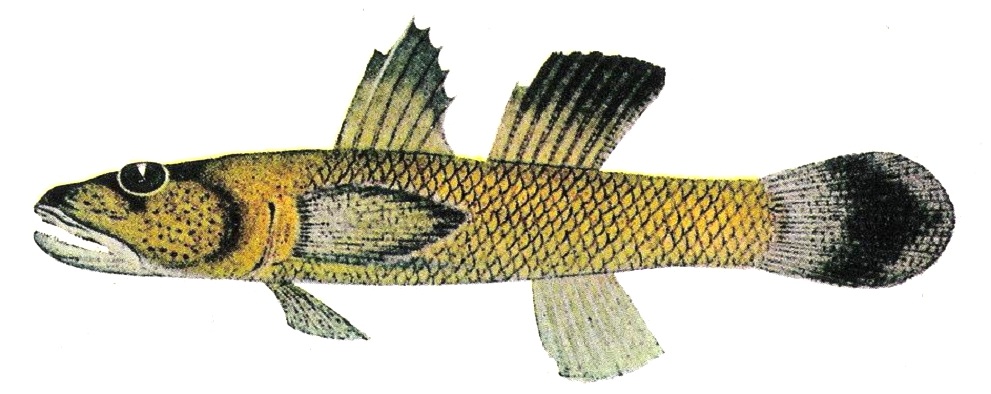
- Rhinogobius_carpenteri

Scientific classification
- Domain: Eukaryota
- Kingdom: Animalia
- Phylum: Chordata
- Class: Actinopterygii
- Order: Gobiiformes
- Family: Oxudercidae
- Genus: Rhinogobius
- Species: R. carpenteri

Binomial name
- Rhinogobius carpenteri Seale, 1910

Synonyms
- Tukugobius carpenteri (Seale, 1910)

= Rhinogobius carpenteri =

Species of fish

Rhinogobius carpenteri is a freshwater species of goby endemic to the Philippines. Its common name in the Philippines is kuchu. The species was named for the co-collector of the cotypes, Mr. W. D. Carpenter. In 1927, Albert William Christian Theodore Herre erected a new genus in the family Gobiidae, Tukugobius and moved R. carpenteri into it as the type species, but the genus was later rendered invalid.

== Description ==
It grows up to 5.9 cm (2.3 in) SL, and is dull yellow-brown, whitish under the jaw, eyes blue, grayish fins with two silvery white anterior spines, silvery white anal fin rays, with the caudal fins shading to dusky at the tip. Additionally, this species reaches a length of 5.9 cm (2.3 in)

== Etymology ==
The fish is named in honor of American naturalist William Dorr Carpenter (1879-1958), who helped collect the type specimen.
