= Wuyanling National Nature Reserve =

Nature reserve in Taishun County, Zhejiang, China

- IUCN category V (protected landscape/seascape)
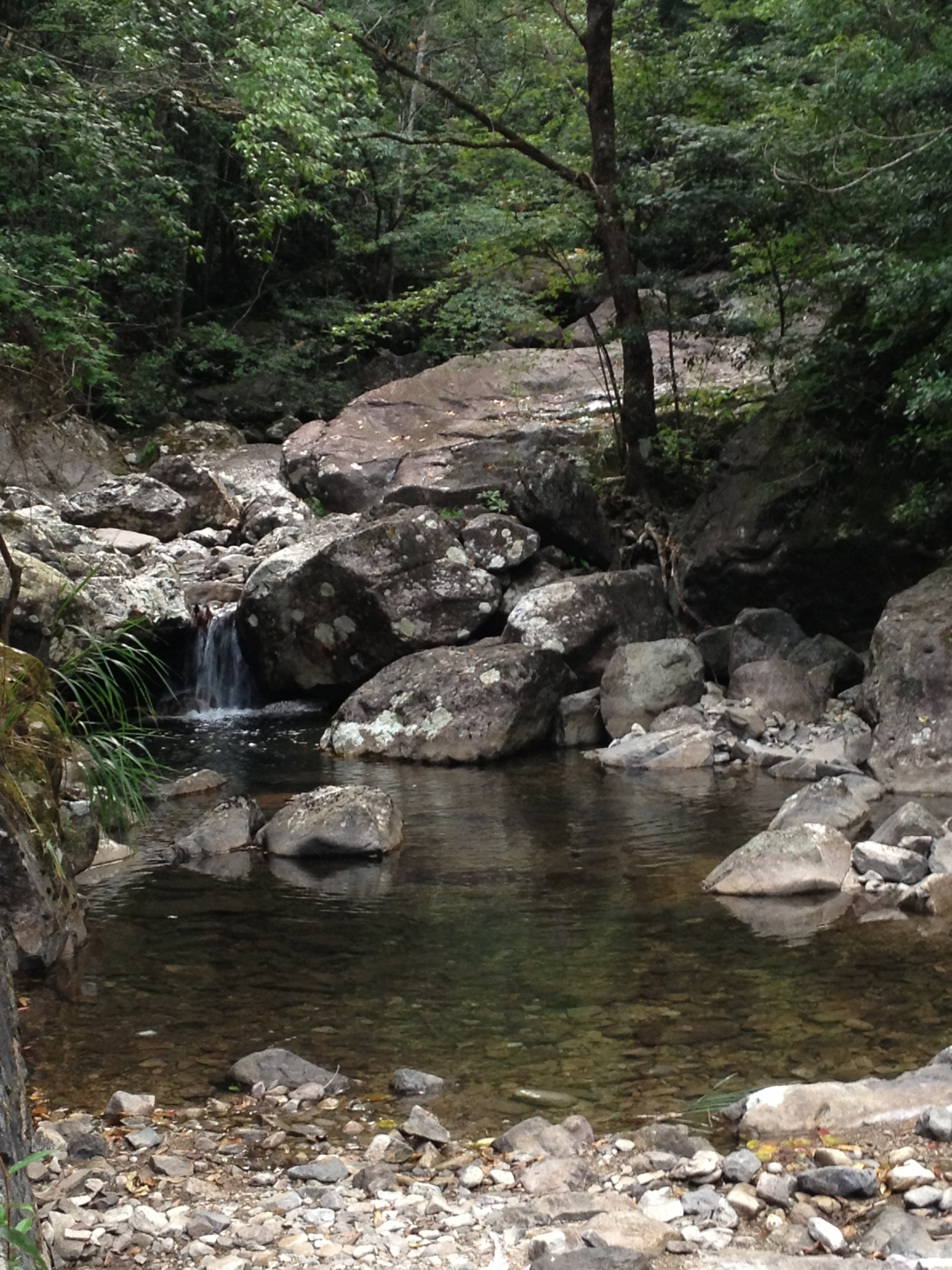

- Location within China
- Location: Zhejiang, China
- Nearest city: Wenzhou
- Coordinates: 27.706°N 119.675°E
- Area: 190.26 km^{2} (73.46 sq mi)
- Established: 1975
- Website: www.wyl.org.cn

Wuyanling National Nature Reserve (Chinese: 乌岩岭; pinyin: wùyánlǐng; lit. 'Black rocks ridge') is a nature reserve in Taishun County, in the southern part of Zhejiang Province. The reserve occupies a mountainous, forested area. The highest peak is Baiyun Peak, which is 1,611 metres (5,285 ft) high.

== Wildlife ==
BirdLife International considers Wuyanling Reserve as an Important Bird Area (IBA). Birds of particular conservation value in the reserve include Cabot's tragopan, much studied in the reserve, and Elliot's pheasant.

A freshwater goby, Rhinogobius wuyanlingensis, has been collected from Wuyanling, described as a new species to science, and named after the reserve.

The reserve's inhabitants also include the Chinese giant salamander. A specimen weighing 3.5 kg (7.7 lb), the largest one for a while, was observed in September 2012. This species, once common in the reserve, has greatly suffered from poaching.

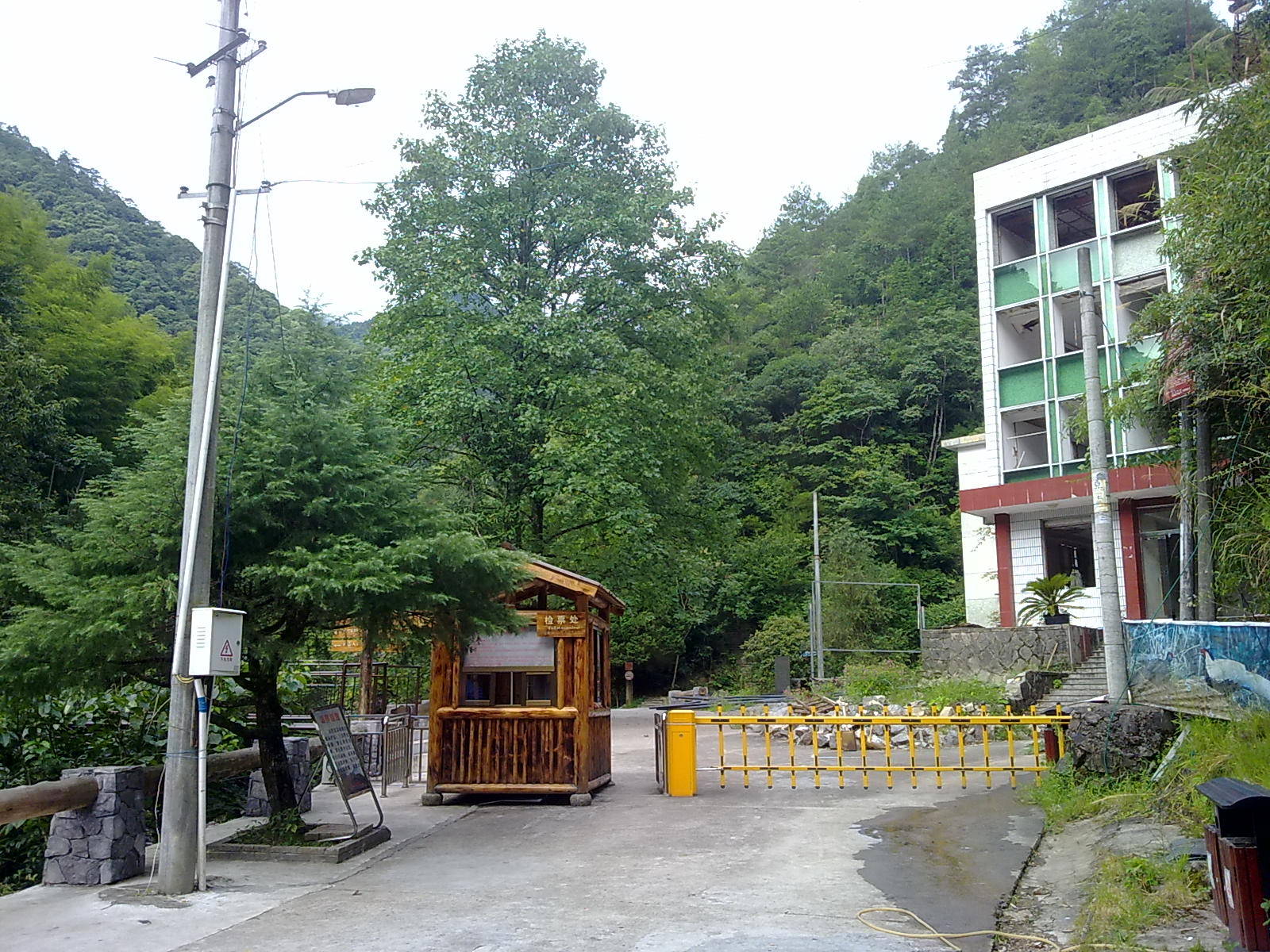
Entrance to the "scenic area" open for tourists.

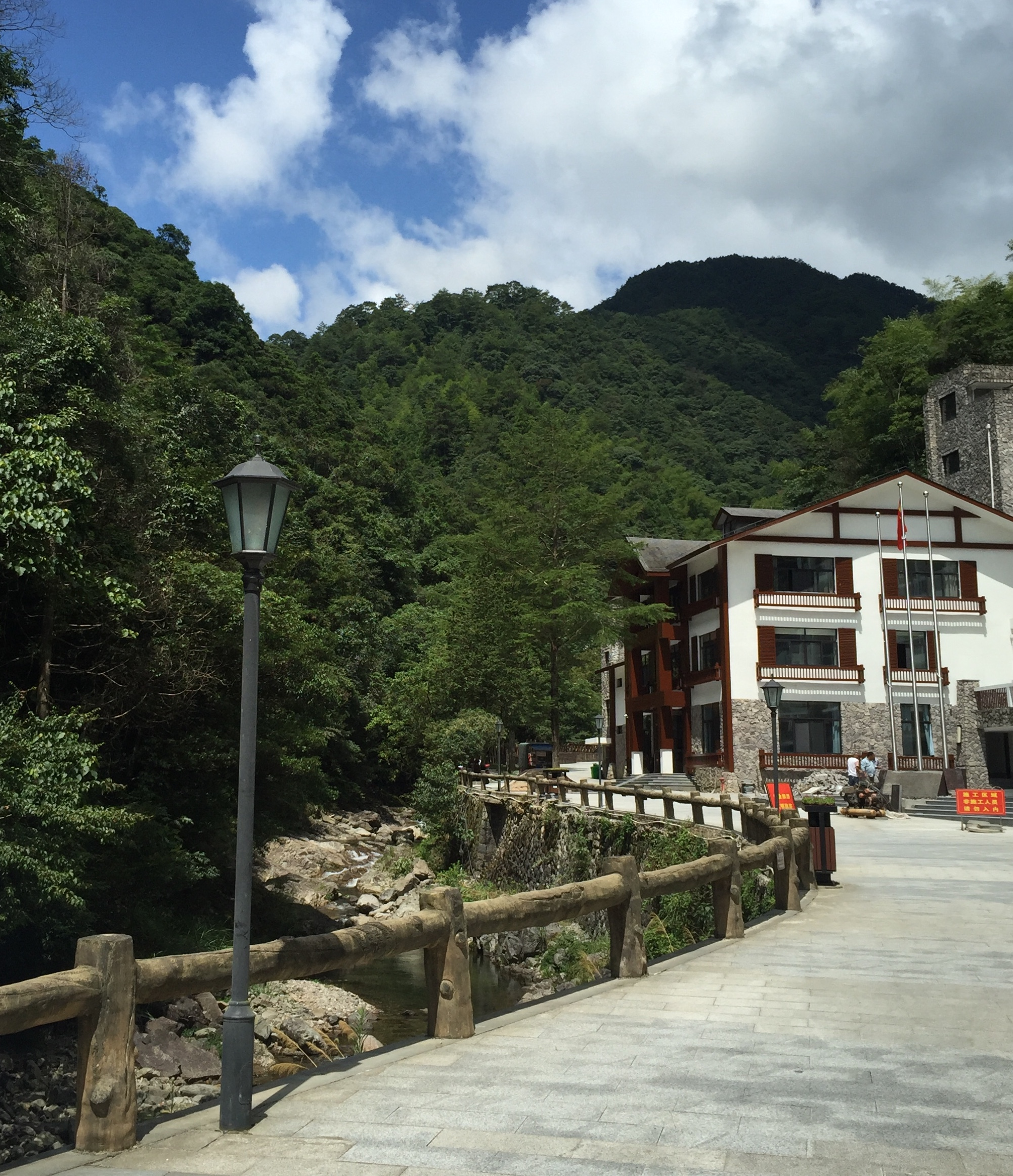
New entrance of park

== Tourism ==
A small part of the reserve is developed as a touristic area; the rest of the park is not accessible to the general public. The network of trails follows two streams, and since 2012, includes a paved path to the Baiyun Peak. In 2012, the scenic area was rated as a 3A touristic attraction.

== Baiyun Peak ==
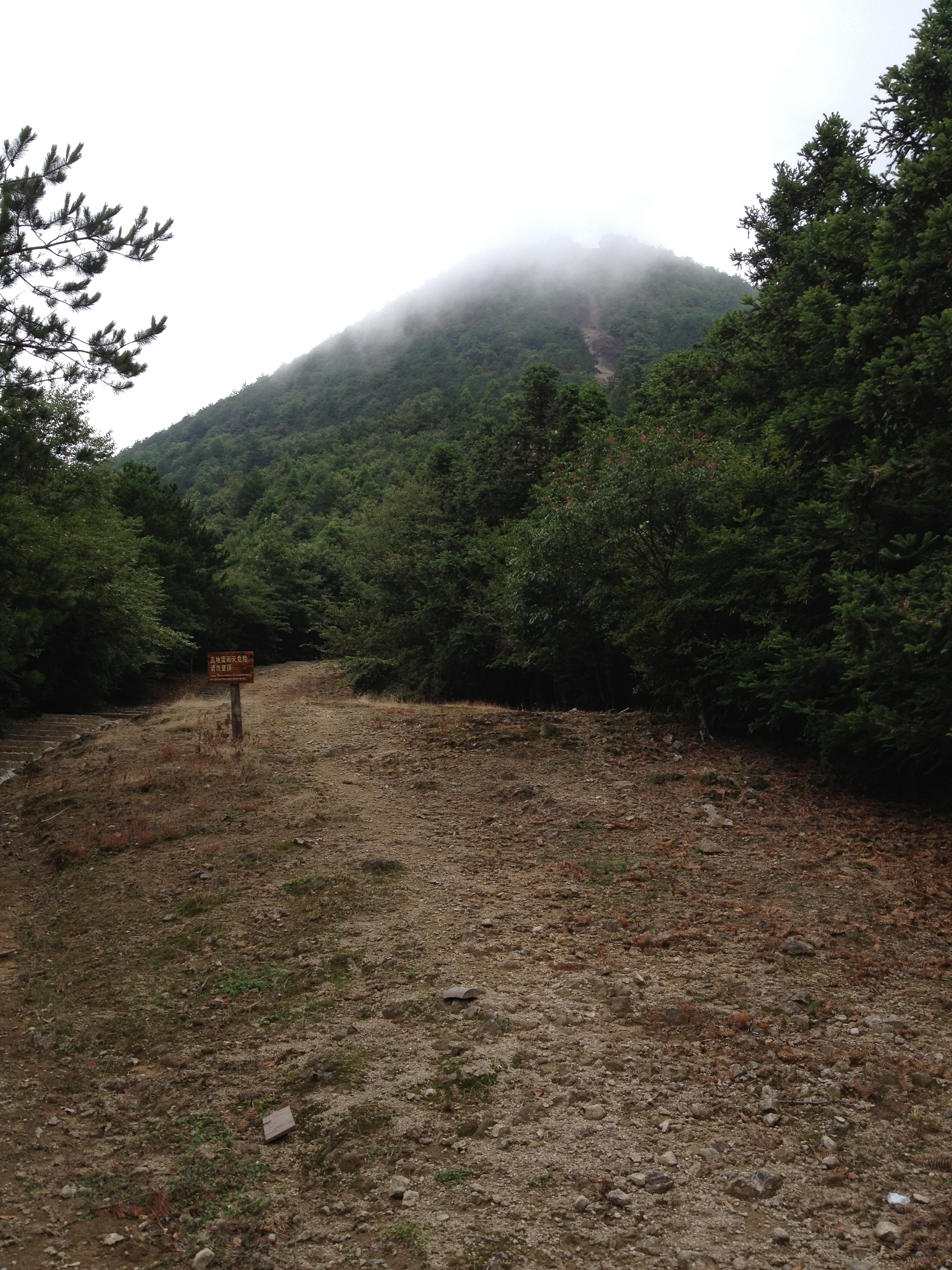
View up the ridge leading to the Baiyun Peak. True to its name, the peak itself is covered by clouds.

At 1,611 metres (5,285 ft), the Baiyun Peak (Baiyunjian, Chinese: 白云尖; pinyin: báiyúnjiān; lit. 'White cloud peak') is the highest mountain in Wenzhou. A paved path now leads to the top.
