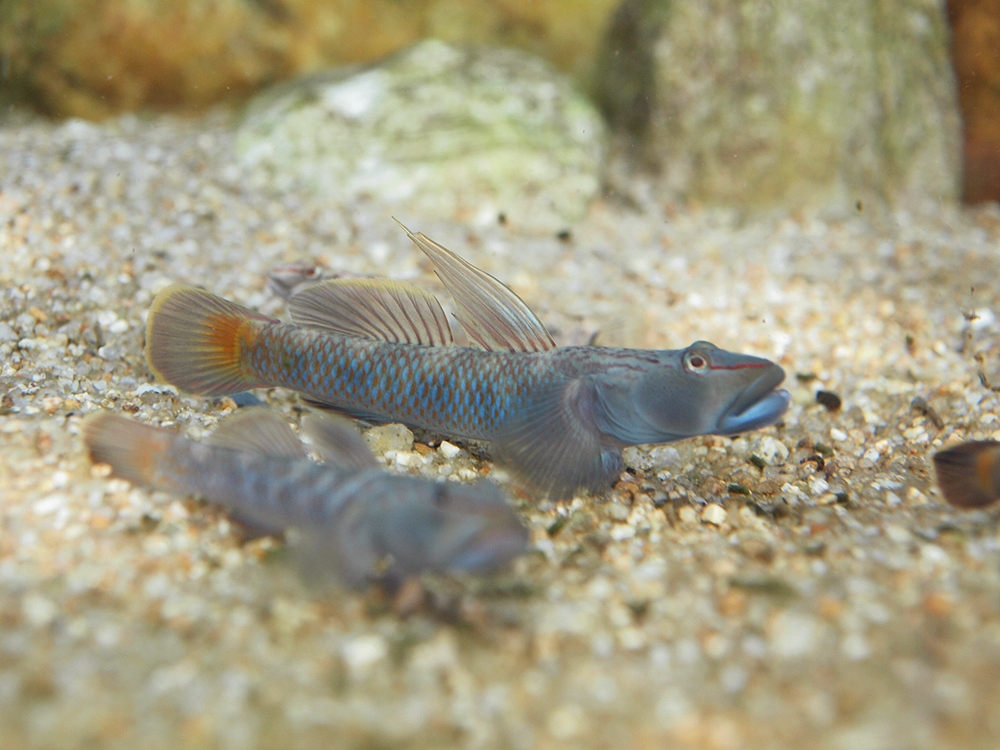

Conservation status
- Data Deficient (IUCN 3.1)

Scientific classification
- Kingdom: Animalia
- Phylum: Chordata
- Class: Actinopterygii
- Order: Gobiiformes
- Family: Oxudercidae
- Genus: Rhinogobius
- Species: R. brunneus

Binomial name
- Rhinogobius brunneus (Temminck & Schlegel, 1845)

Synonyms
- Gobius brunneus Temminck & Schlegel, 1845; Ctenogobius brunneus (Temminck & Schlegel, 1845); Rhinogobius brunneus brunneus (Temminck & Schlegel, 1845); Rhinogobius sowerbyi Ginsburg, 1917; Ctenogobius sowerbyi (Ginsburg, 1917)

= Rhinogobius brunneus =

Species of fish

Rhinogobius brunneus, the common freshwater or the Amur goby, is a complex of several species in the family Oxudercidae. It is found in the Asian river basins of the seas of the Pacific coasts of Japan, Taiwan, the rivers of Korea, China, the Philippines, and Vietnam.

== Description ==
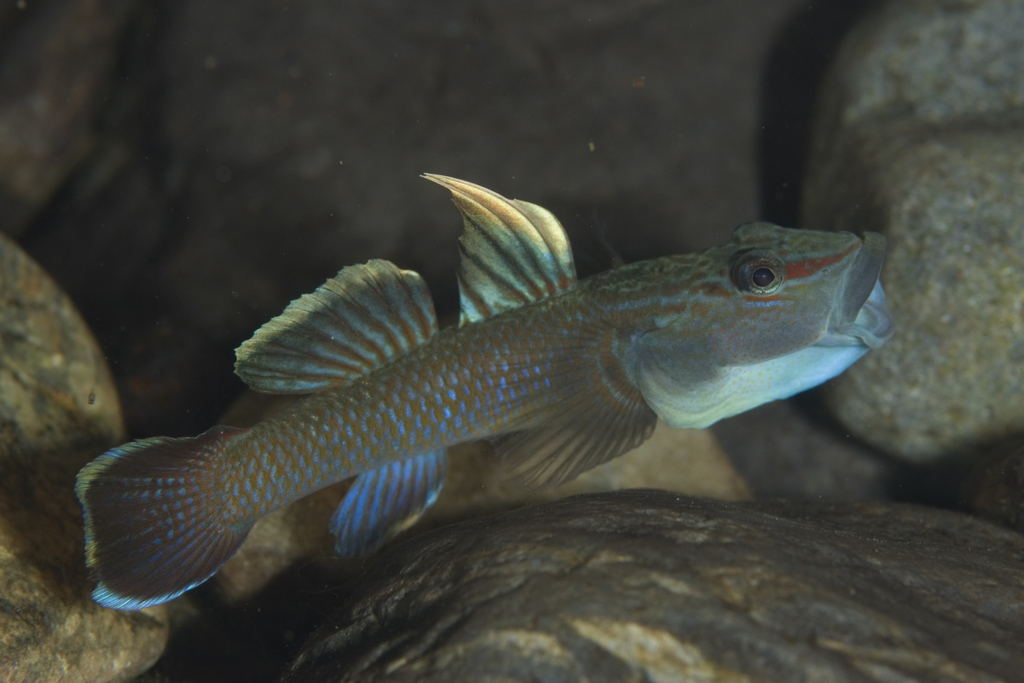

Rhinogobius brunneus has a cylindrical body that tapers into a laterally compressed rear. The body is brown and may have patterning such as dark vertical banding. A red line runs from the eye's anterior edge to the snout's tip. Both sexes have an orange splotch at the base of the caudal fin, with it being less pronounced in females. R. brunneus measures at around 40 mm during the first two years of life, but will reach over 65 mm after four years. This species has fused pelvic fins that form a suction-cup structure on the chest. The lips are thick with the mouth ending at the anterior of the eye. Jaws have three or four rows of conical teeth. The vertebral count is 26. The common freshwater goby has two dorsal fins, the first with six spines and the second with a single spine and eight rays. It also has one anal spine, eight anal rays, and 18-20 pelvic fin rays. The first dorsal fin is tall and triangular shaped while the second is shorter, rounded, and begins at the midbody. The anal fin is positioned symmetrically to the second dorsal fin but is comparatively smaller. The pectoral fin and caudal fin are rounded.

The Rhinogobius brunneus complex contains many color morphs. These color morphs are considered genetically different from each other and also show differences in microhabitat preference and egg size. Up to eight morphs have been described, most commonly: cross-band, dark, mosaic, and large-dark. The cross-band type is characterized by obvious cross-bands on the side of the body, a wavy vertical band on the caudal peduncle, a thick blue band running longitudinally across the belly, vertical bands on the pectoral fin, and small spots on the fins. The large-dark color morph can be identified by no markings on the cheek, a dark triangular blotch on the caudal peduncle, a diamond-shaped blotch on the pectoral fins, and white fringing on the fins. The taxonomy for this species complex is not resolved.

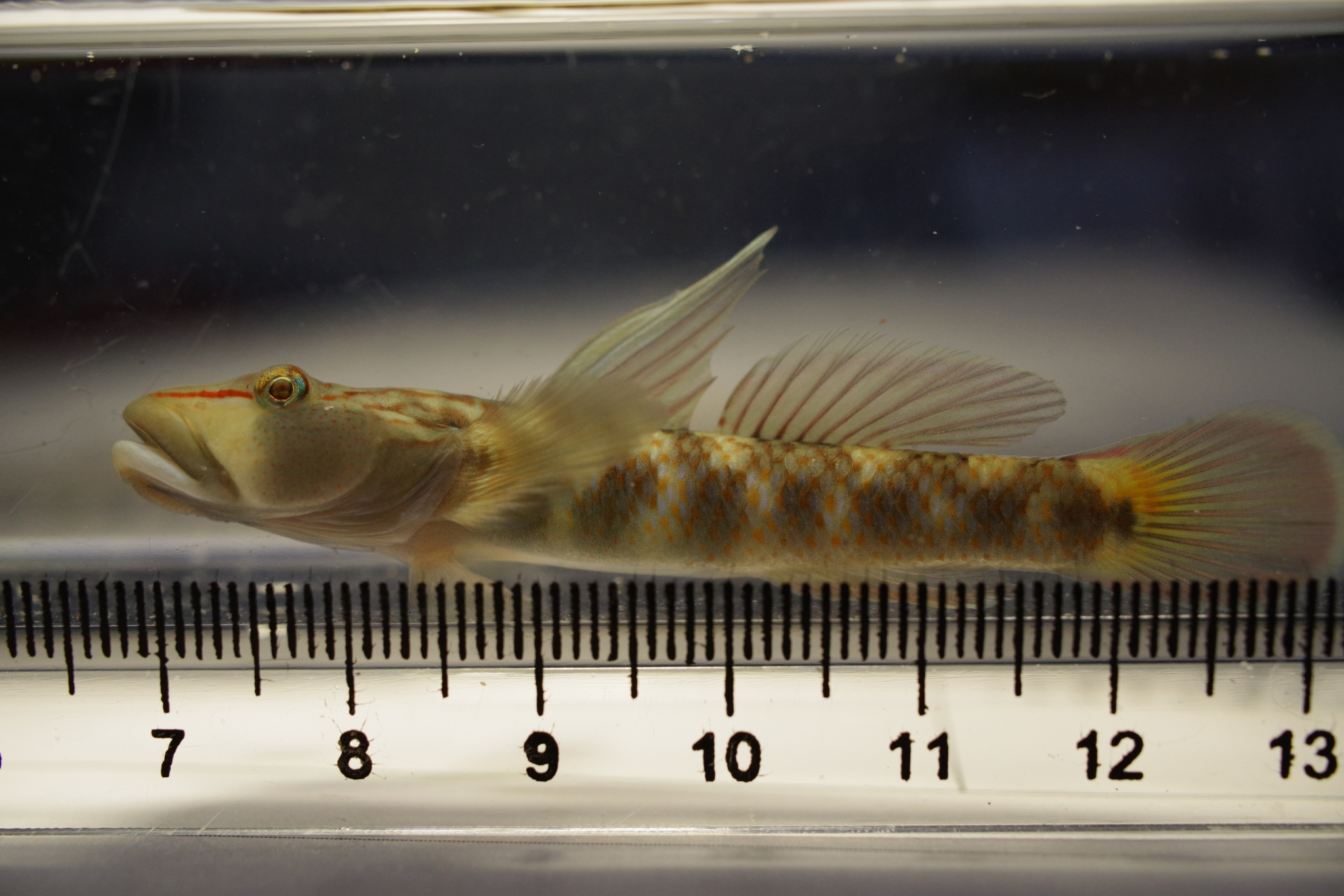

R. brunneus can be distinguished from other Rhinogobius fish through the combined characteristics of having a vertebrae count of 26, 11-13 predorsal scales, the distal tip of the first dorsal fin reaching the first or second segmented ray base of the second dorsal fin, and the presence of vertical dark lines or spots on the caudal fin. For instance, this contrasts with a similar species, R. mizunoi, which has 13-18 predorsal scales and does not have vertical dark lines or spots on the caudal fin.

== Distribution and habitat ==
Rhinogobius brunneus is distributed throughout the East Asian river basins but tends to concentrate in short rivers facing the Pacific Ocean. It can be found in all river courses in Japan except for Hokkaido and Tohoku. R. brunneus has also been introduced to the Arabian Gulf and the United States.

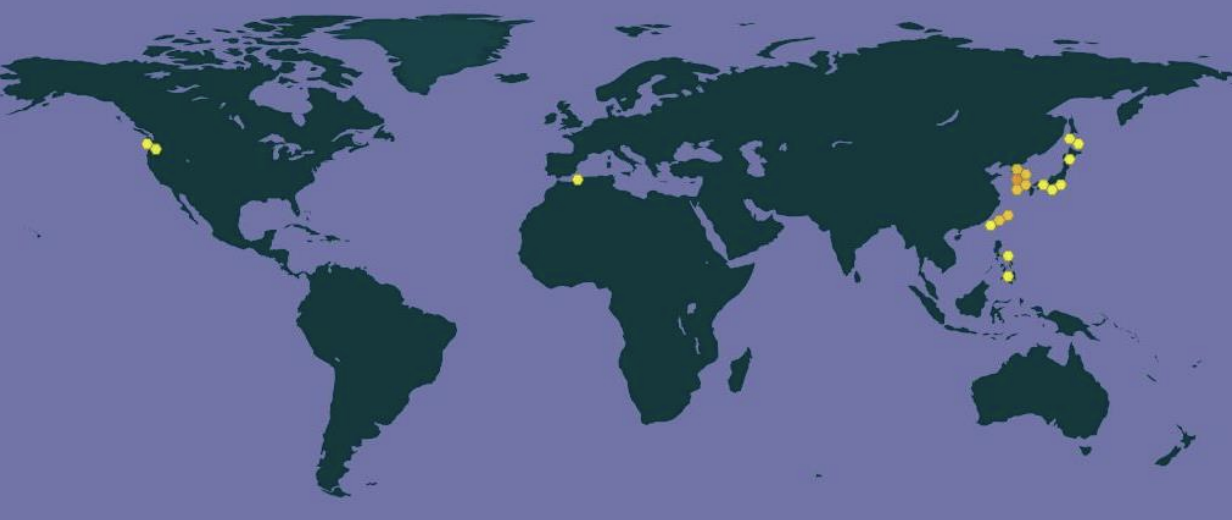

== Biology ==
Most species of Rhinohobius brunneus are amphidromous and very tolerant of a variety of salinity levels. R. brunneus fry will drift downstream to the ocean and ascend back up streams as three-month-old juveniles. Adult gobies and fluviatile species spend their lives in rivers.

These fish are omnivorous and feed on attached algae and small aquatic invertebrates.

== Reproduction ==
The males and females are sexually mature after one year. Males build nests under rocks in the freshwater rapids and runs but return to the pools to look for females. Females will deposit their eggs in the nest and then leave the male to fan and protect the eggs for three to five days or up to two weeks (depending on water temperature) until they hatch. During this time, the males guard the eggs and do not leave to find sources of food. Therefore, a deteriorating male may cannibalize his eggs. Spawning occurs in early April to early July with clutches of 600-1,700 eggs. Females can spawn more than once in one breeding season, and nests may contain eggs from more than one female.

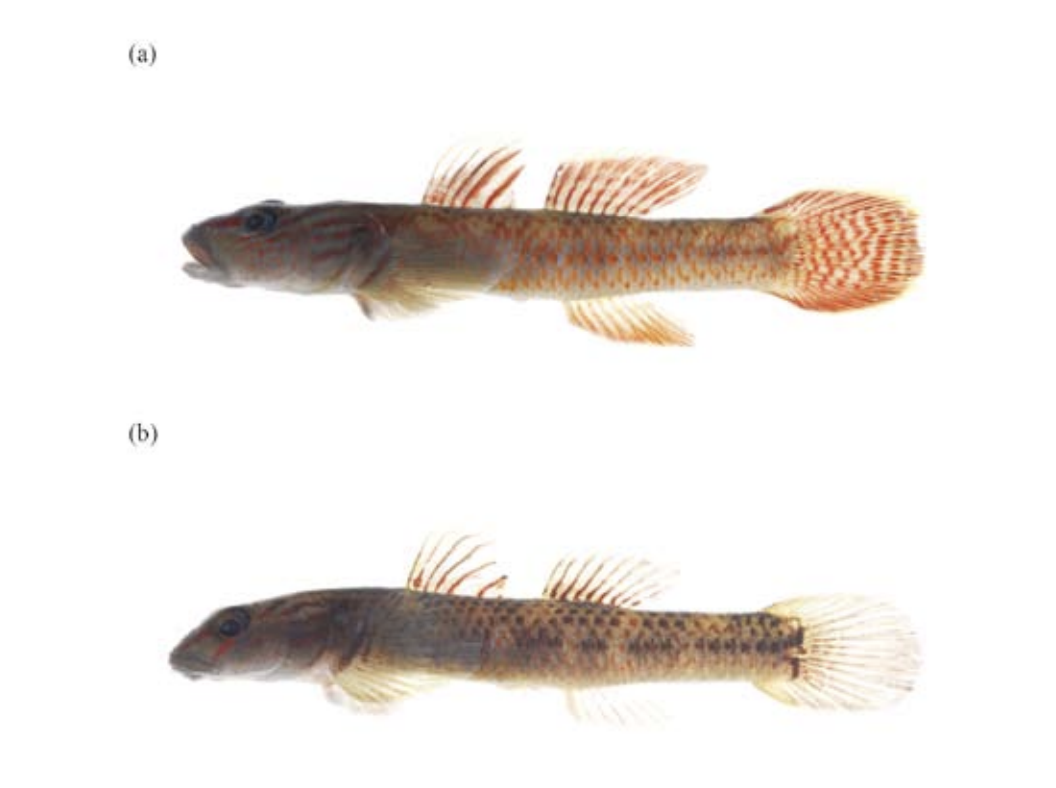
(A) Male Rhinogobius brunneus;(B) Female Rhinogobius brunneus

Male gobies of some species in this complex will perform courtship displays to attract females. The courtship display involves the male approaching the female, and then shaking his head. If the female bends her body as a sign of acceptance, the male will try to lead her to his nest while spreading his fins and vibrating his body. The display usually lasts less than 10 seconds. Females prefer males that court in faster currents, as it is an honest sign of good physical ability. Female choice of males was not affected by sexually dimorphic traits such as body size.

The females of the dark color type of Rhinogobius brunneus will have a bright nuptial coloration with black lines on the cheeks, yellow on the belly, and white in the trunk. Males will only court females with this coloration. Males do not exhibit a breeding coloration. The eggs of this color morph are elliptical and about 1.9 mm long and 0.8 mm wide.

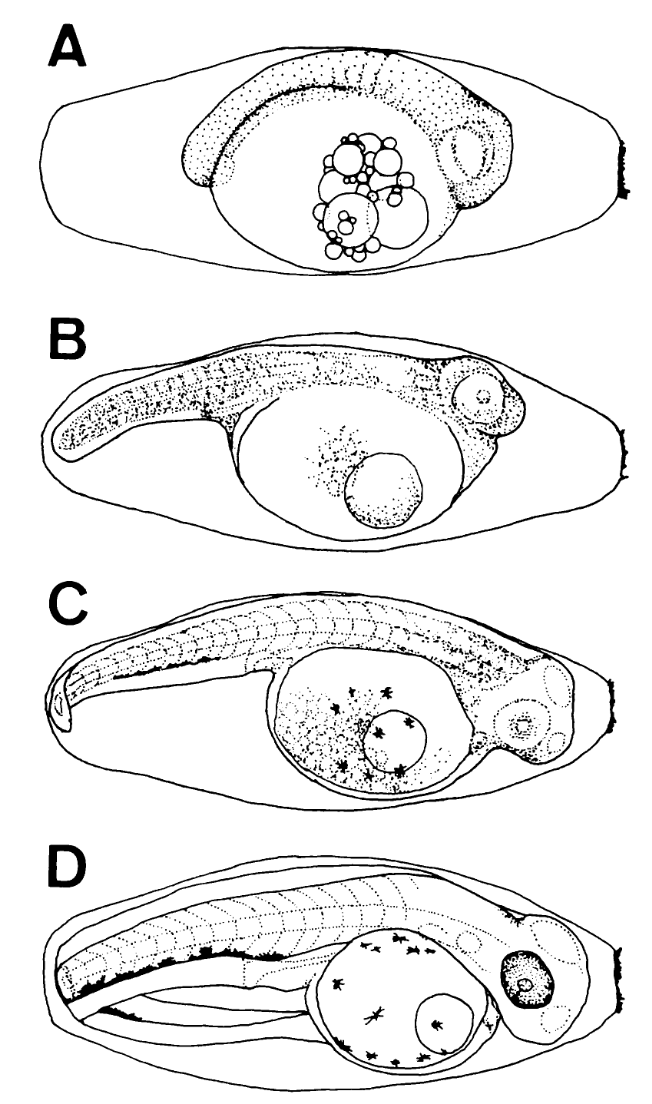
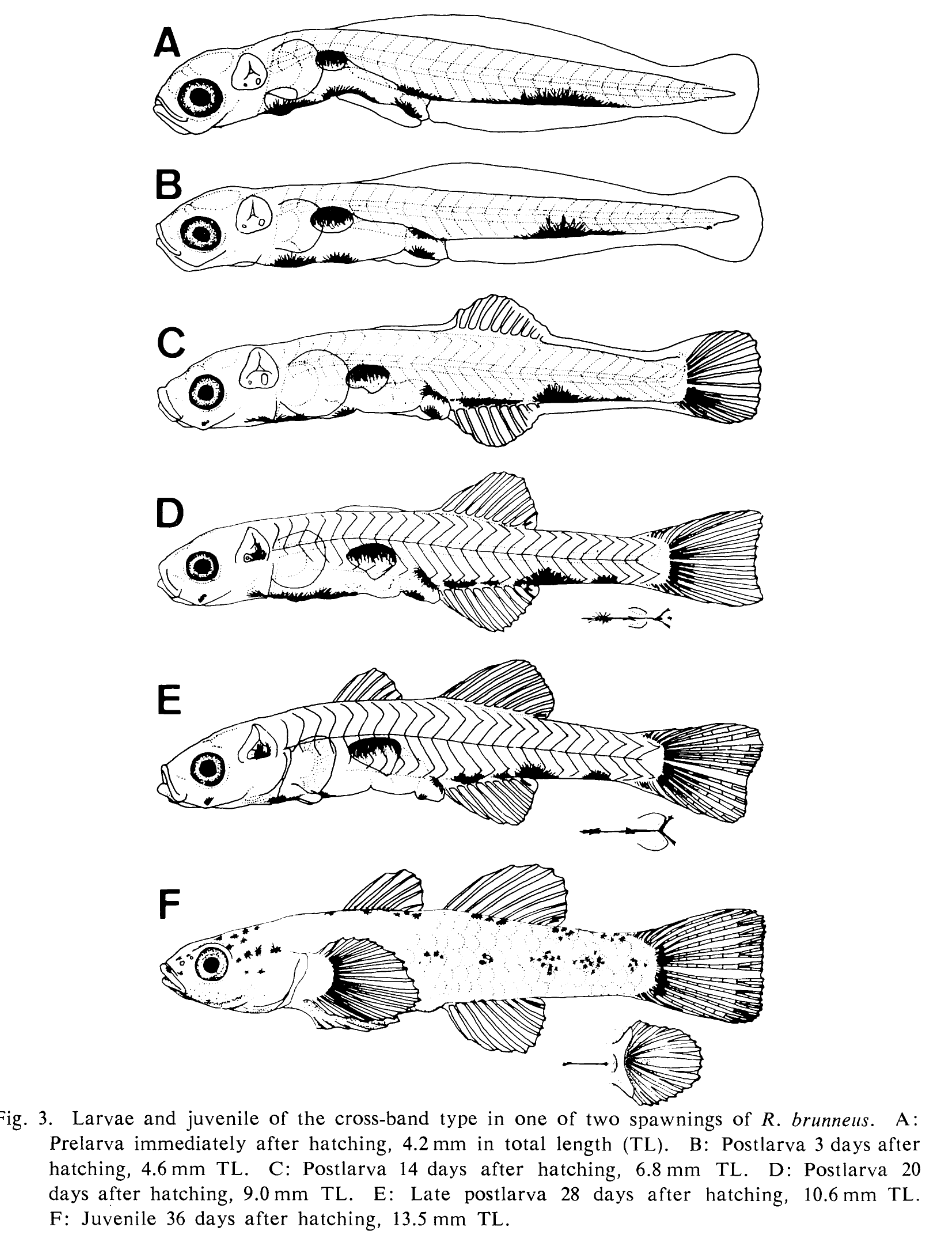
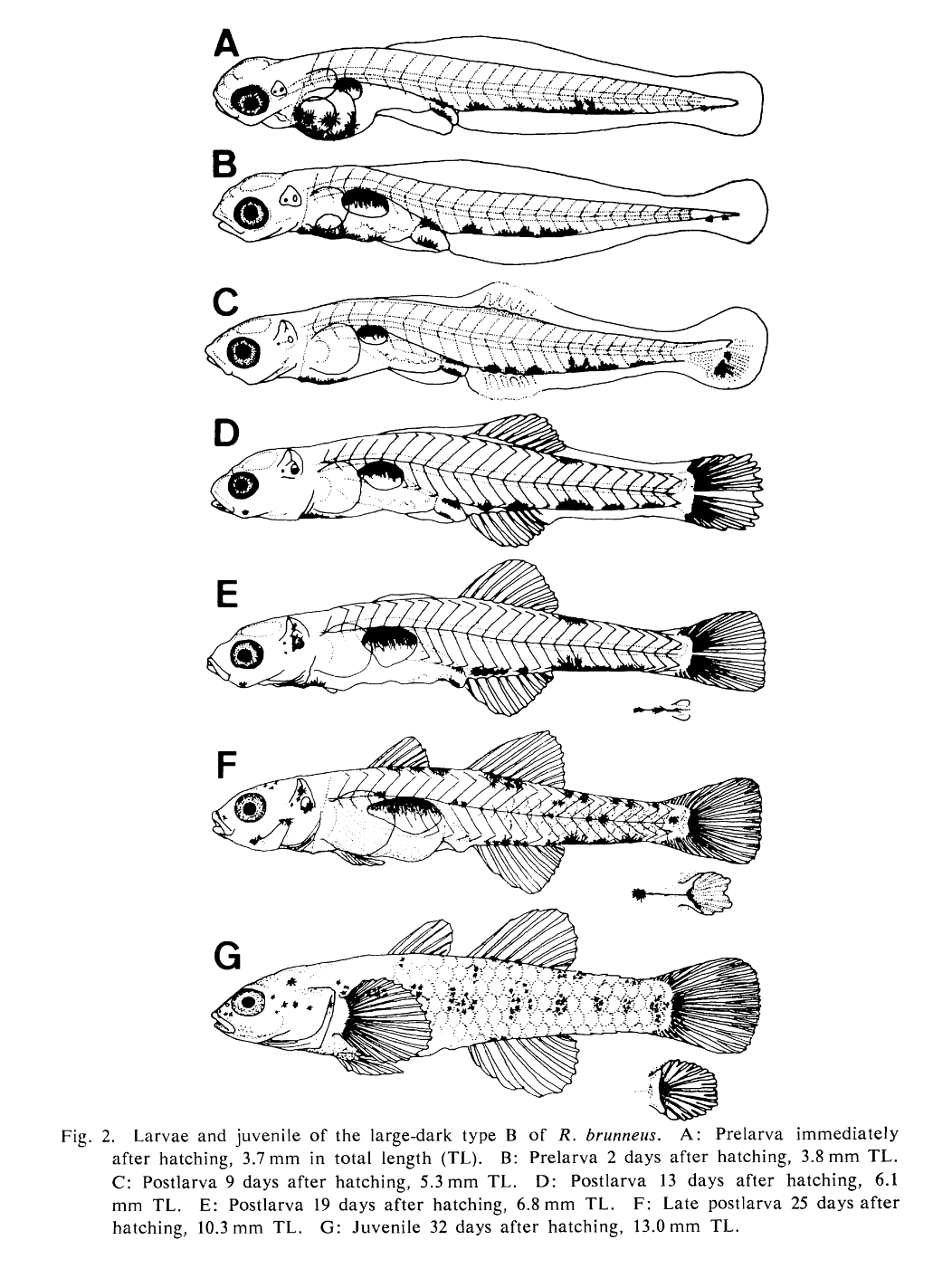

== Conservation ==
Rhinogobius brunneus abundance has decreased significantly and is classified as an endangered species in the Fukui Prefecture of Japan. The species live in short rivers, which are threatened by riverbank management work, dams, etc.
