= Taishun County =

County in Zhejiang, China

Taishun 泰顺县
- County
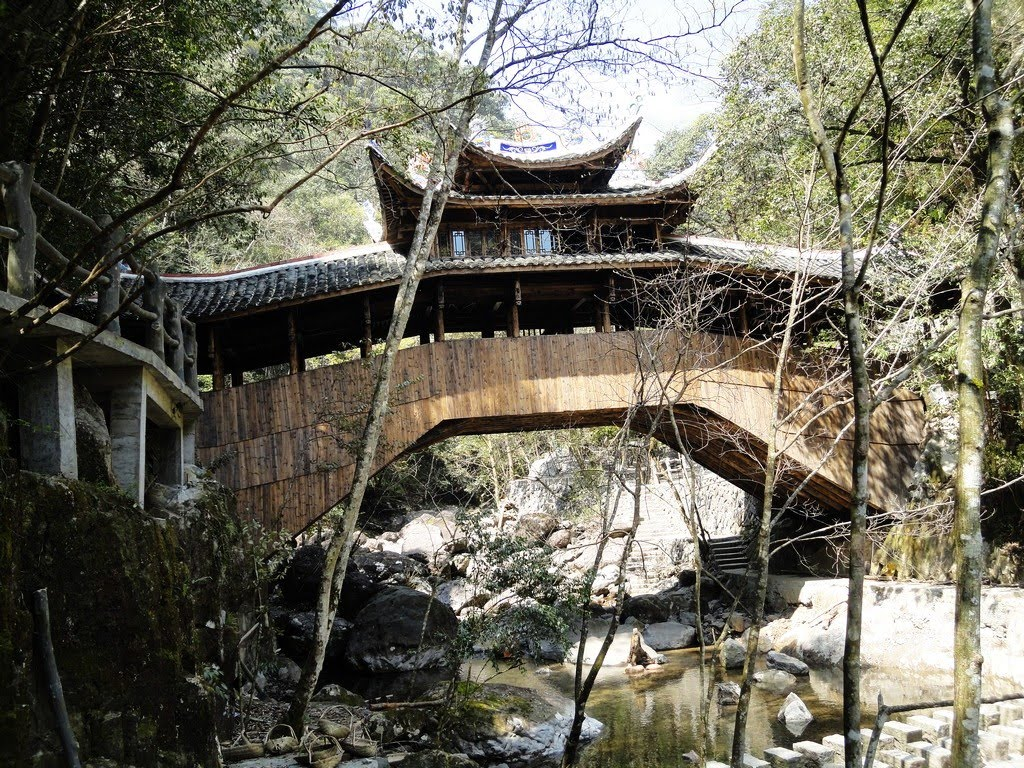
- Covered bridge at Wuyanling National Nature Reserve

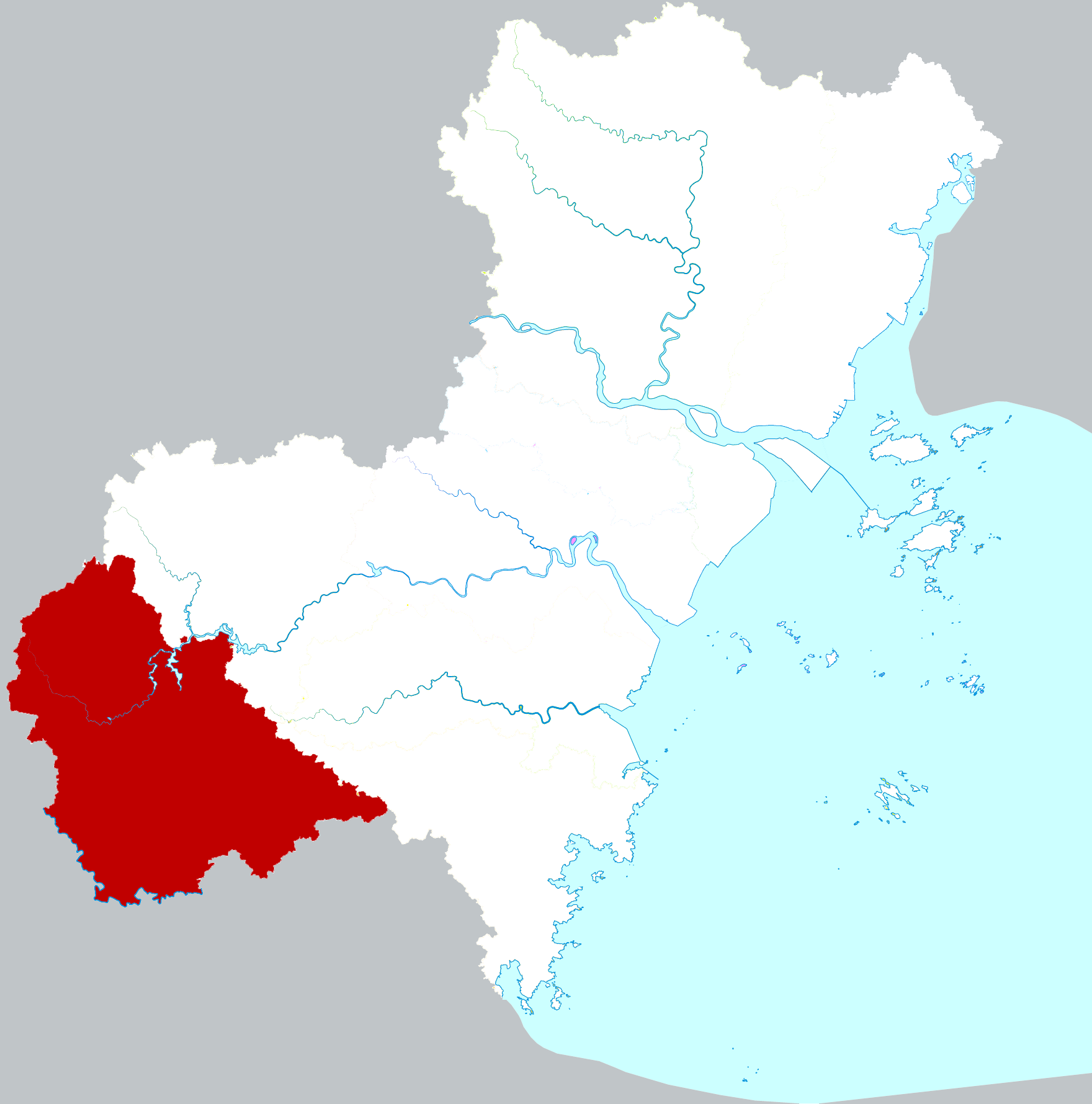
- Location of Taishun County within Wenzhou

- Location of the seat in Zhejiang
- Coordinates: 27°33′25″N 119°43′05″E
- Country: People's Republic of China
- Province: Zhejiang
- Prefecture-level city: Wenzhou

Area
  - Total: 1,768.02 km^{2} (682.64 sq mi)

Population (2020)
  - Total: 266,400
  - Density: 150.7/km^{2} (390.3/sq mi)
- Time zone: UTC+8 (China Standard)

Taishun County (Chinese: 泰顺县; pinyin: Tàishùn Xiàn) is a county in the prefecture-level city of Wenzhou, in the southern part of Zhejiang province, China, bordering Fujian province to the southeast, south, and west.

Taishun County has more than 900 covered bridges, many of them hundreds of years old, as well as a covered bridge museum. Wuyanling National Nature Reserve in the west of the county represents significant natural values as well as being a touristic attraction.

The 2007 population was 350,000.

== Administrative divisions ==
Towns:

- Luoyang (罗阳镇), Baizhang (百丈镇), Sixi (泗溪镇), Yayang (雅阳镇), Shiyang (仕阳镇), Sankui (三魁镇), Xiaocun (筱村镇), Pengxi (彭溪镇)

Townships:

- Siqian She Ethnic Township (司前畲族镇), Zhuli She Ethnic Township (竹里畲族乡)

== Climate ==
Climate data for Taishun, elevation 539 m (1,768 ft), (1991–2020 normals, extremes 1981–2010)
Month	Jan	Feb	Mar	Apr	May	Jun	Jul	Aug	Sep	Oct	Nov	Dec	Year
Record high °C (°F)	25.6 (78.1)	29.2 (84.6)	32.3 (90.1)	34.4 (93.9)	35.2 (95.4)	36.6 (97.9)	39.2 (102.6)	38.5 (101.3)	35.3 (95.5)	33.2 (91.8)	33.3 (91.9)	25.2 (77.4)	39.2 (102.6)
Mean daily maximum °C (°F)	11.5 (52.7)	13.4 (56.1)	16.7 (62.1)	22.0 (71.6)	25.5 (77.9)	28.3 (82.9)	31.8 (89.2)	31.0 (87.8)	27.5 (81.5)	23.2 (73.8)	18.5 (65.3)	13.6 (56.5)	21.9 (71.4)
Daily mean °C (°F)	6.4 (43.5)	8.0 (46.4)	11.1 (52.0)	16.2 (61.2)	20.1 (68.2)	23.5 (74.3)	26.0 (78.8)	25.3 (77.5)	22.4 (72.3)	17.8 (64.0)	13.2 (55.8)	8.1 (46.6)	16.5 (61.7)
Mean daily minimum °C (°F)	2.9 (37.2)	4.2 (39.6)	7.2 (45.0)	11.8 (53.2)	16.1 (61.0)	20.1 (68.2)	21.9 (71.4)	21.7 (71.1)	18.9 (66.0)	13.8 (56.8)	9.3 (48.7)	4.3 (39.7)	12.7 (54.8)
Record low °C (°F)	−8.4 (16.9)	−6.9 (19.6)	−5.3 (22.5)	0.6 (33.1)	5.7 (42.3)	9.6 (49.3)	17.0 (62.6)	14.1 (57.4)	9.5 (49.1)	1.5 (34.7)	−3.9 (25.0)	−10.5 (13.1)	−10.5 (13.1)
Average precipitation mm (inches)	75.3 (2.96)	99.1 (3.90)	181.9 (7.16)	172.2 (6.78)	243.3 (9.58)	325.7 (12.82)	216.9 (8.54)	310.1 (12.21)	203.1 (8.00)	73.9 (2.91)	75.3 (2.96)	69.2 (2.72)	2,046 (80.54)
Average precipitation days (≥ 0.1 mm)	15.0	15.8	19.3	18.0	19.7	20.7	17.5	20.8	16.7	10.1	11.6	11.7	196.9
Average snowy days	1.8	2.1	0.3	0.1	0	0	0	0	0	0	0	0.4	4.7
Average relative humidity (%)	82	83	82	80	81	84	80	83	82	79	82	80	82
Mean monthly sunshine hours	102.3	94.5	106.0	126.6	128.7	125.5	207.9	184.2	151.7	155.5	119.4	122.8	1,625.1
Percentage possible sunshine	31	30	28	33	31	30	49	46	41	44	37	38	37
Source: China Meteorological Administration

== Notable people ==
- Liu Chao, a cannibal criminal born in Taishun County in 1974, killed a female accountant in Hangzhou Rhine Building (Chinese: 莱茵达大厦) on February 19, 1999 and dismembered and cooked the body.
