= Wu Han-Lin =

Chinese ichthyologist and fish taxonomist (1934–2022)

- 伍汉霖
- Born: April 1934; Zhaoqing, Guangdong, China
- Died: 3 June 2022 (aged 88); Shanghai, China
- Known for: Research on gobies, poisonous fish and medicinal fish
- Title: Director of the Fish Research Laboratory, Department of Aquatic Biology, Shanghai Ocean University; Chief Academic Adviser
- Awards: State Council Special Allowance (1992 onwards); First Prize of the National Fisheries Science and Technology Achievement Award (1981)

Academic background
- Education: Shanghai Fisheries College (now Shanghai Ocean University)
- Academic advisor: Chu Yuan-ting

Academic work
- Institutions: Shanghai Ocean University
- Notable works: Fauna Sinica: Osteichthyes, Perciformes (V), Gobioidei (2008); A New Account of Chinese Poisonous and Medicinal Fishes (2002); Systematic Search of Marine and Estuarine Fishes of China (2021); Latin-Chinese-English Dictionary of World Fishes (2012; 2017)

Wu Han-Lin (Chinese: 伍汉霖; April 1934 – 3 June 2022) was a Chinese ichthyologist and fish taxonomist. He was born in Zhaoqing, Guangdong, China. He studied under Chu Yuan-ting, one of the principal pioneers and founders of modern Chinese ichthyology, and graduated from Shanghai Fisheries College (now Shanghai Ocean University) in 1956.

Wu spent much of his career researching fish taxonomy and morphology. He was particularly known for his work on gobies, poisonous fish and medicinal fish. He served as director of the Fish Research Laboratory in the Department of Aquatic Biology at Shanghai Ocean University and later as its chief academic adviser.

He was regarded as a living encyclopaedia of ichthyology in China. He also collaborated with Taiwanese ichthyologists, including Shao Guangzhao, and participated in compiling the fish volume of the Catalogue of Life China, published in 2020.

== Biography ==
=== Early life and education ===
Wu Han-Lin was born in April 1934 in Zhaoqing, Guangdong, China. He enrolled in the aquatic biology programme at Shanghai Fisheries College, where he studied under Chu Yuan-ting, one of the founders of modern Chinese fish taxonomy. He graduated in 1956 and remained at the college, initially working as a research assistant to Chu.

During fieldwork collecting specimens in the East China Sea with Chu, Wu discovered a new species of hairtail, an experience that stimulated his lifelong interest in the discovery and classification of new fish species.

He subsequently participated in the preparation of Fishes of the East China Sea (1963) and research on the taxonomy of Chinese Sciaenidae, including descriptions of new genera and species. He also took part in nationwide surveys of China's marine fish fauna.

=== Academic career ===
During the period when Shanghai Fisheries College was relocated to Xiamen, Wu participated extensively in surveys of fish resources in the southern Fujian fishing grounds and the Taiwan Strait. He also contributed to the publication of Fishes of Fujian.

He later participated in ichthyological surveys of the Paracel Islands, Hainan Island and Guangdong. His publications from this period included Fishes of the Waters around the South China Sea Islands (1979), Freshwater and Estuarine Fishes of Hainan Island, and Freshwater Fishes of Guangdong (1991).

Fishes of the Waters around the South China Sea Islands received the First Prize of the National Fisheries Science and Technology Achievement Award in 1981.

In 1978, Wu was the first author of Chinese Poisonous and Medicinal Fishes, a comprehensive study describing more than 250 species of poisonous and medicinal fish. The book became an important reference for the fisheries, medical and public health sectors. Professors from the University of Tokyo and Nagasaki University spent approximately ten years translating it into Japanese. The translation was published in Japan by Koseisha Koseikaku in 1999.

Wu served for many years as director of the Fish Research Laboratory of Shanghai Ocean University's Department of Aquatic Biology and subsequently as its chief academic adviser. From 1992, he received the State Council Special Allowance in recognition of his contributions to science.

After retiring in 1999, he continued working in the university's specimen collection, identifying and organising fish specimens. He also contributed fish-related entries to the 2009 edition of the Cihai encyclopaedia.

In his later years, Wu led a ten-year project involving 14 scholars to compile Systematic Search of Marine and Estuarine Fishes of China. Published in 2021, the work documented 3,711 species of marine and estuarine fish and was regarded as an important culmination of his academic career.

Wu died on 3 June 2022 at Xinhua Hospital, affiliated with Shanghai Jiao Tong University School of Medicine, in Shanghai, aged 88.

== Research and academic contributions ==
=== Goby taxonomy ===
Wu was one of China's leading authorities on the taxonomy of gobies. He led the preparation of Fauna Sinica: Osteichthyes, Perciformes (V): Gobioidei, published by Science Press in 2008.

Among the fish genera he described were Polyspondylogobius (1994) and Neodontobutis (2002). He also maintained a long-standing academic collaboration with Akihito, the former Emperor of Japan, with whom he exchanged fish specimens over a period of approximately 40 years.

=== Poisonous and medicinal fish ===
Wu conducted extensive research on poisonous fish, particularly following reports of poisoning caused by the consumption of fish gallbladders.

Through systematic animal experiments, he demonstrated that the gallbladders of fish in the family Cyprinidae contain toxins. His research challenged traditional medicinal claims recorded in the Compendium of Materia Medica (Bencao Gangmu), which had identified certain fish gallbladders as medicinal substances.

He subsequently published warnings to the public about the dangers of consuming fish gallbladders. His 1978 work on Chinese poisonous and medicinal fish was considered an important foundational reference in this field and was later translated into Japanese.

=== Taxonomic descriptions ===
Working under the guidance of Chu Yuan-ting, Wu participated in the description and classification of numerous new fish taxa. Species described by the research team included the small-eye shark, Guangdong skate, longnose sixgill ray, shorttail snake eel, brown catfish, Chinese grunt, Chinese sleeper, Wu's beard goby and large blue mudskipper. During his career, Wu was credited with describing six new genera, 33 new species and four new subfamilies. The genera associated with his taxonomic work included Atrobucca (1963) and Megalonibea (1963).

== Selected publications ==
=== Books and monographs ===
- Systematic Search of Marine and Estuarine Fishes of China (中国海洋及河口鱼类系统检索), edited by Wu Han-Lin and Zhong Junsheng. China Agriculture Press, 2021. ISBN 9787109279995.
- Catalogue of Life China, Volume 2: Animals, Vertebrates (V): Fishes (中国生物物种名录), co-edited with other ichthyologists including Shao Guangzhao. Science Press, 2020. ISBN 97870300677358.
- Fauna Sinica: Osteichthyes, Perciformes (V): Gobioidei (中国动物志：硬骨鱼纲 鲈形目（五）虾虎鱼亚目), with Zhong Junsheng and others. Science Press, 2008. ISBN 9787030213334.
- Fishes of Jiangsu (江苏鱼类志), edited with Ni Yong. China Agriculture Press, 2006. ISBN 9787109111691.
- A New Account of Chinese Poisonous and Medicinal Fishes (中国有毒及药用鱼类新志). China Agriculture Press, 2002. ISBN 9787109067905.
- Latin-Chinese-English Dictionary of World Fishes (拉汉世界鱼类名典), with Shao Guangzhao and other collaborators. Fisheries Publishing House, 1999. ISBN 9789578596597.
- Latin-Chinese-English Systematic Dictionary of World Fishes (拉汉世界鱼类系统名典). China Ocean University Press, 2017. ISBN 9789578596764.

=== Collaborative publications ===
- Fishes of the Waters around the South China Sea Islands (南海诸岛海域鱼类志). Science Press, 1979. Research project led by the South China Sea Fisheries Research Institute, Chinese Academy of Fishery Sciences. Contributors included Cheng Qingtai, Li Sizhong, Zeng Bingguang, Wu Han-Lin and others. The work received the First Prize of the National Fisheries Science and Technology Achievement Award in 1981.
- Freshwater Fishes of Guangdong (广东淡水鱼类志), with Pan Jionghua, Zhong Lin, Zheng Ciying and Liu Jiazhao. Guangdong Science and Technology Press, 1991. ISBN 7535906338.
- Systematic Search of Chinese Fishes (中国鱼类系统检索), edited by Cheng Qingtai and Zheng Baoshan. Science Press, 1987.
- Complete Collection of Chinese Vertebrates (中国脊椎动物大全), with other contributors. Liaoning University Press, 2000. ISBN 7561039042.
- Fishes of the East China Sea (东海鱼类志), edited by Chu Yuan-ting, Zhang Chunlin and Cheng Qingtai. Science Press, 1963.

== Fish species named in his honour ==
- Microdous hanlini Wang, He & Li, 2024, a new species of fine-toothed sleeper (family Odontobutidae) from Guangxi, China.
