= Odontobutis sinensis =

Conservation status
- Least Concern (IUCN 3.1)

Scientific classification
- Kingdom: Animalia
- Phylum: Chordata
- Class: Actinopterygii
- Division: Teleostei
- Order: Gobiiformes
- Family: Odontobutidae
- Genus: Odontobutis
- Species: O. sinensis

Binomial name
- Odontobutis sinensis H. L. Wu, I. S. Chen & D. H. Chong, 2002

Species of fish

Odontobutis sinensis is a species of freshwater ray-finned fish belonging to the family Odontobutidae, the Asian freshwater sleepers. This fish is endemic to China.

== Taxonomy ==
Odontobutis sinensis was first formally described in 2002 by the Chinese biologists Wu Han-Lin, I-Shiung Chen and Chong Di-Hua with its type locality given as Liang-tze Hu, Hubei, China at 30°15'N, 114°20'E. This species is classified in the genus Odontobutis which was described in 1874 by Pieter Bleeker with Eleotris obscura Temminck & Schlegel 1845 designated as the type species, as well as being the type by monotypy. Within this genus this species forms a clade with O. haifengensis and this clade is sister to the remaining taxa in the group. The genus Odontobutis is the type genus of the family Odontobutidae which is included in the suborder Gobioidei in the order Gobiiformes, which also includes the cardinalfishes and sand-divers.

== Etymology ==
Odontobutis sinensis is classified in the genus Odontobutis, this name combines donto, a Neo-Latin combining form of odoús, meaning "tooth", Bleeker did not explain what this alluded to, it may refer to the outer row of teeth, which are slightly enlarged compared to Butis, both genera were thought to be in the same family at the time this genus was named. The specific name , sinensis, means "of China" , this species being endemic to China.

== Description ==
Odontobutis sinensis reaches a maximum total length of 18.1 cm (7.1 in).

== Distribution and habitat ==
Odontobutis sinensis is endemic to China where itis found in lakes of the upper and middle Yangtze River Basin and drainages of the Pearl River and the Min River. It has been recorded from the provinces of Anhui, Chongqing, Guangdong, Guangxi, Guizhou, Hubei, Hunan, Jiangxi, Shaanxi and Sichuan. This sleeper is found in shallow lal=kes and rivers, even in ditches where it is typically found overgravel and aquatic vegetation.

== Biology ==
Odontobutis sinensis breeds from April to June, spawning in caves, in bivalve shells, among and under stones or among aquatic plants. They spend the winter hiding in deep water. They prey on small animanls such as crustaceans and small fish.

== Utilisation ==
Odontobutis sinensis is prized as a food fish, although it is often taken as by-catch in shrimp fisheries and in some plces suffers from overfishing.
