= Odontobutis potamophilus =

Conservation status
- Data Deficient (IUCN 3.1)

Scientific classification
- Kingdom: Animalia
- Phylum: Chordata
- Class: Actinopterygii
- Division: Teleostei
- Order: Gobiiformes
- Family: Odontobutidae
- Genus: Odontobutis
- Species: O. potamophilus

Binomial name
- Odontobutis potamophilus (Günther, 1861)

Synonyms
- Eleotris potamophila Günther, 1861; Eleotris obscura potamophila Günther, 1861; Philypnus potamophilus (Günther, 1861); Eleotris varius Dabry de Thiersant, 1872; Eleotris davidi Sauvage & Dabry de Thiersant, 1874; Odontobutis wui J. T. F. Chen, 1934; Gobiomorphus pellegrini Fang, 1942

Species of fish

Odontobutis potamophila is a species of freshwater ray-finned fish belonging to the family Odontobutidae, the Asian freshwater sleepers. This fish is found in China and Vietnam.

== Taxonomy ==
Odontobutis potamophilus was first formally described as Eleotris potamophila in 1861 by the German-born British herpetologist and ichthyologist Albert Günther with its type locality given as Yang-tse-kiang, China. This species is classified in the genus Odontobutis which was described in 1874 by Pieter Bleeker with Eleotris obscura Temminck & Schlegel 1845 designated as the type species, as well as being the type by monotypy. Within this genus this species forms a clade with O. hikimius and this clade is sister to O. yaluensis. The genus Odontobutis is the type genus of the family Odontobutidae which is included in the suborder Gobioidei in the order Gobiiformes, which also includes the cardinalfishes and sand-divers.

== Etymology ==
Odontobutis potamophilus is classified in the genus Odontobutis, this name combines donto, a Neo-Latin combining form of odoús, meaning "tooth", Bleeker did not explain what this alluded to, it may refer to the outer row of teeth, which are slightly enlarged compared to Butis, both genera were thought to be in the same family at the time this genus was named. The specific name , potamophilus, means "river lover" , this is an allusion to the referred riverine habitat of this species.

== Description ==
Odontobutis potamophilus has a fusiform body shape and it reaches a maximum total length of 15.2 cm (6.0 in), although a standard length of 11.5 cm (4.5 in) is more typical. The pectoral fin is long, reaching to under the origin of the second dorsal fin. There is not pale longitudinal band along the back,, distinguishing this species from O. interruptus.

== Distribution ==
Odontobutis potamophilus is found in the Yangtze basin of China, it is probably also present in northern Vietnam.

== Utilisation ==
Odontobutis potamophilus is regarded as a high-value species in China and it is used in aquaculture, it is mostly farmed in integrated culture with rice and crayfish and in recirculating aquaculture systems.
