= Odontobutis yaluensis =

Conservation status
- Least Concern (IUCN 3.1)

Scientific classification
- Kingdom: Animalia
- Phylum: Chordata
- Class: Actinopterygii
- Division: Teleostei
- Order: Gobiiformes
- Family: Odontobutidae
- Genus: Odontobutis
- Species: O. yaluensis

Binomial name
- Odontobutis yaluensis H. L. Wu, X. Q. Wu & Y. H. Xie, 1993

Species of fish

Odontobutis yaluensis, the Yalu dark sleeper, is a species of freshwater ray-finned fish belonging to the family Odontobutidae, the Asian freshwater sleepers. This fish is found in northeastern China and North Korea.

== Taxonomy ==
Odontobutis yaluensis was first formally described in 1993 by the Chinese biologists Wu Han-Lin, Wu Xiao-Qing and [[[Xie Yu-Hao]] with its type locality given as Chang-dian, Yalu River drainage, China. This species is classified in the genus Odontobutis which was described in 1874 by Pieter Bleeker with Eleotris obscura Temminck & Schlegel 1845 designated as the type species, as well as being the type by monotypy. Within this genus this species forms a clade with O. platycephala and this clade is sister to the clades comprising O. potamophilus and O. interruptus. The genus Odontobutis is the type genus of the family Odontobutidae which is included in the suborder Gobioidei in the order Gobiiformes, which also includes the cardinalfishes and sand-divers.

== Etymology ==
Odontobutis yaluensis is classified in the genus Odontobutis, this name combines donto, a Neo-Latin combining form of odoús, meaning "tooth", Bleeker did not explain what this alluded to, it may refer to the outer row of teeth, which are slightly enlarged compared to Butis, both genera were thought to be in the same family at the time this genus was named. The specific name , yalunsis, means "of the Yalu" , the type locality being in the Yalu drainage.

== Description ==
Odontobutis yaluensis reaches a total length of 20 cm (7.9 in) and has a slightly flattened head, the trunk is cylindrical in cross section becoming laterally compressed towards the tail. The sensory canal system on the head is reduced; when present, there are just 1 or 2 short canals and no canals before gill cover. It has a large mouth with thick lips and the lower jaw is longer than the upper. Both jaws bear small, sharp recurved teeth. The background colour of the body is brown marked with scattered, irregular dark blotches. The fins are marked with rows of dark spots. The first dorsal fin has between 5 and 8 spines, the second dorsal fin has a single spine and 9 or 10 soft rays while the anal fin has a single spine and between 7 and 9 soft rays.

== Distribution and habitat ==
Odontobutis yaluensis is found in northeastern China and in North Korea and has been recorded from the Taizi River, Liao , mid-lower Yalu, Dayang and Biliu He and the Liaodong Peninsula. This is a benthic fish of shallow freshwaters where there are mixed substrates including mud, pebbles, sand, and aquatic weeds.

== Biology ==
Odontobutis yaluensis feeds on aquatic insects, prawns, small fish, aquatic worms and plant debris as adults while the juveniles predominantly eat zooplankton. They reach sexual maturity at the age of 1 or 2 years. The Yalu dark slepper normally spawns between April and June. Males makes nests under the shelter of rocks, the females lay sticky eggs on the ceiling of the spece under the chsoen rock and the males tend the eggs unti they hatch.
