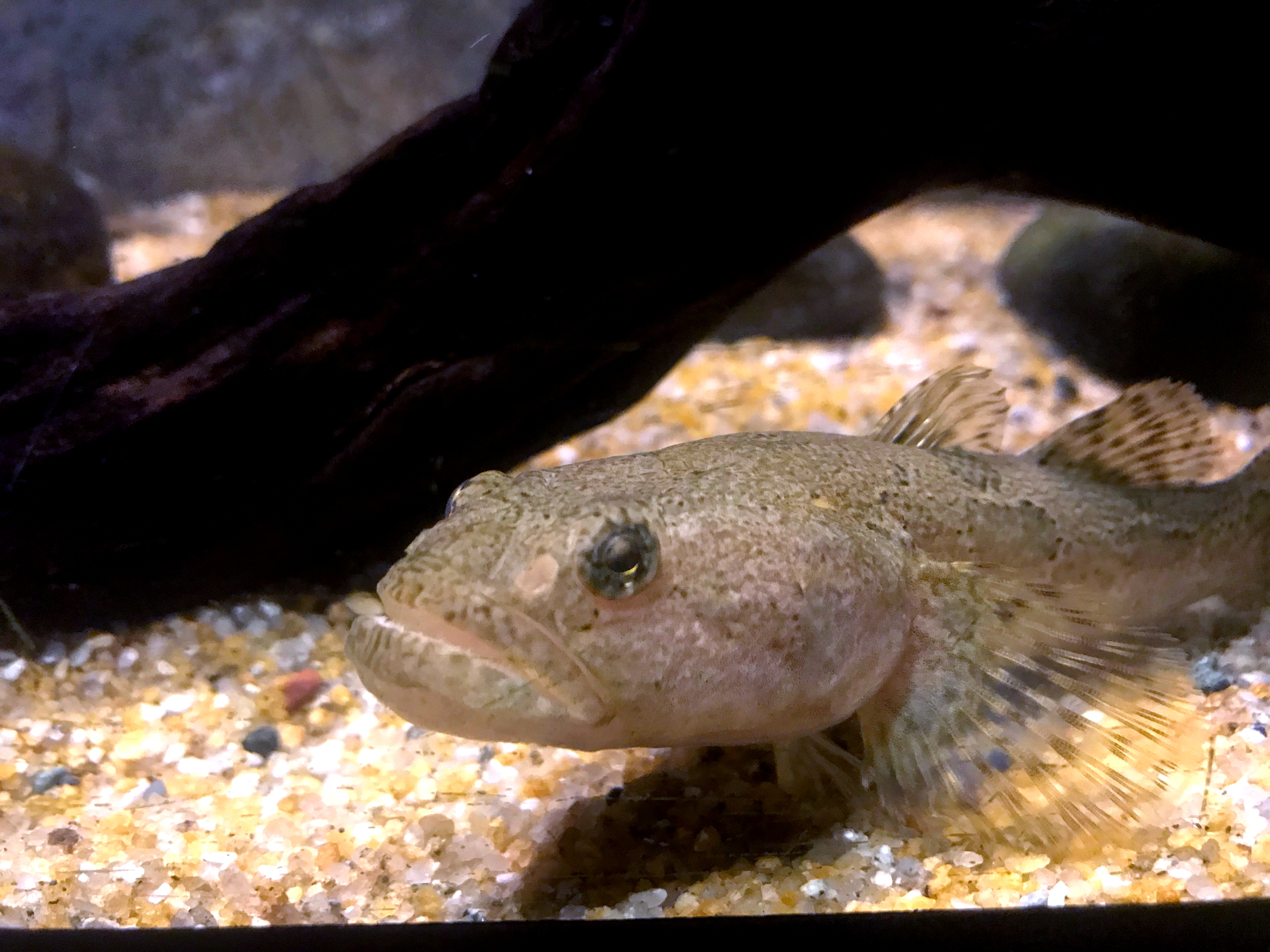

Scientific classification
- Kingdom: Animalia
- Phylum: Chordata
- Class: Actinopterygii
- Division: Teleostei
- Order: Gobiiformes
- Family: Odontobutidae
- Genus: Odontobutis
- Species: O. interruptus

Binomial name
- Odontobutis interruptus Iwata & Jeon, 1985

Synonyms
- Odontobutis obscura interrupta Iwata & Jeon, 1985

= Odontobutis interruptus =

Species of fish

Odontobutis interruptus, the Korean spotted sleeper, is a species of freshwater ray-finned fish belonging to the family Odontobutidae, the Asian freshwater sleepers. This fish is endemic to Korea.

== Taxonomy ==
Odontobutis interruptus was first formally described in 1985 by Akihisa Iwata and Sang-Rin Jeon with its type locality given as the Nagil River, of Geum River system, Kumchong-gi, Sayang-myon, Chongyang-gun, Chungchongnam-do, Korea at 36°25'N, 126°50'E. This species is classified in the genus Odontobutis which was described in 1874 by Pieter Bleeker with Eleotris obscura Temminck & Schlegel 1845 designated as the type species, as well as being the type by monotypy. Within this genus this species forms a clade with O. potamophilus and this clade is sister to O. yaluensis. The genus Odontobutis is the type genus of the family Odontobutidae which is included in the suborder Gobioidei in the order Gobiiformes, which also includes the cardinalfishes and sand-divers.

== Etymology ==
Odontobutis interruptus is classified in the genus Odontobutis, this name combines donto, a Neo-Latin combining form of odoús, meaning "tooth", Bleeker did not explain what this alluded to, it may refer to the outer row of teeth, which are slightly enlarged compared to Butis, both genera were thought to be in the same family at the time this genus was named. The specific name , interruptus, means "interrupted" in Latin, this is an allusion to the pale transverse bands ibn the body being broken by a pale horizintal line along each side of the body.

== Description ==
Odontobutis interruptus has a fusiform body shape and it reaches a total length of 17 cm (6.7 in). It has a long pectoral fin, which reaches to below the second dorsal fin. It is disinguished from O. potamophilus by the pale longitudinal stripe aling each side.

== Distribution and habitat ==
Odontobutis interruptus is endemic to Korea where it is known only from South Korea, in the rivers draining into the Yellow Sea. The Korean spotted sleeper is found in the middle and lower reaches of slow-ﬂowing rivers.

== Biology ==
Odontobutis interruptus is a carnivorous predator feeding on aquatic insects, ﬁsh, and shrimp. They breed inetween March and May, laying deersal eggs that adhere to the substrate in gravel where there is a slow current. The male tends the eggs, oxgentaing them and removing inviable eggs.
