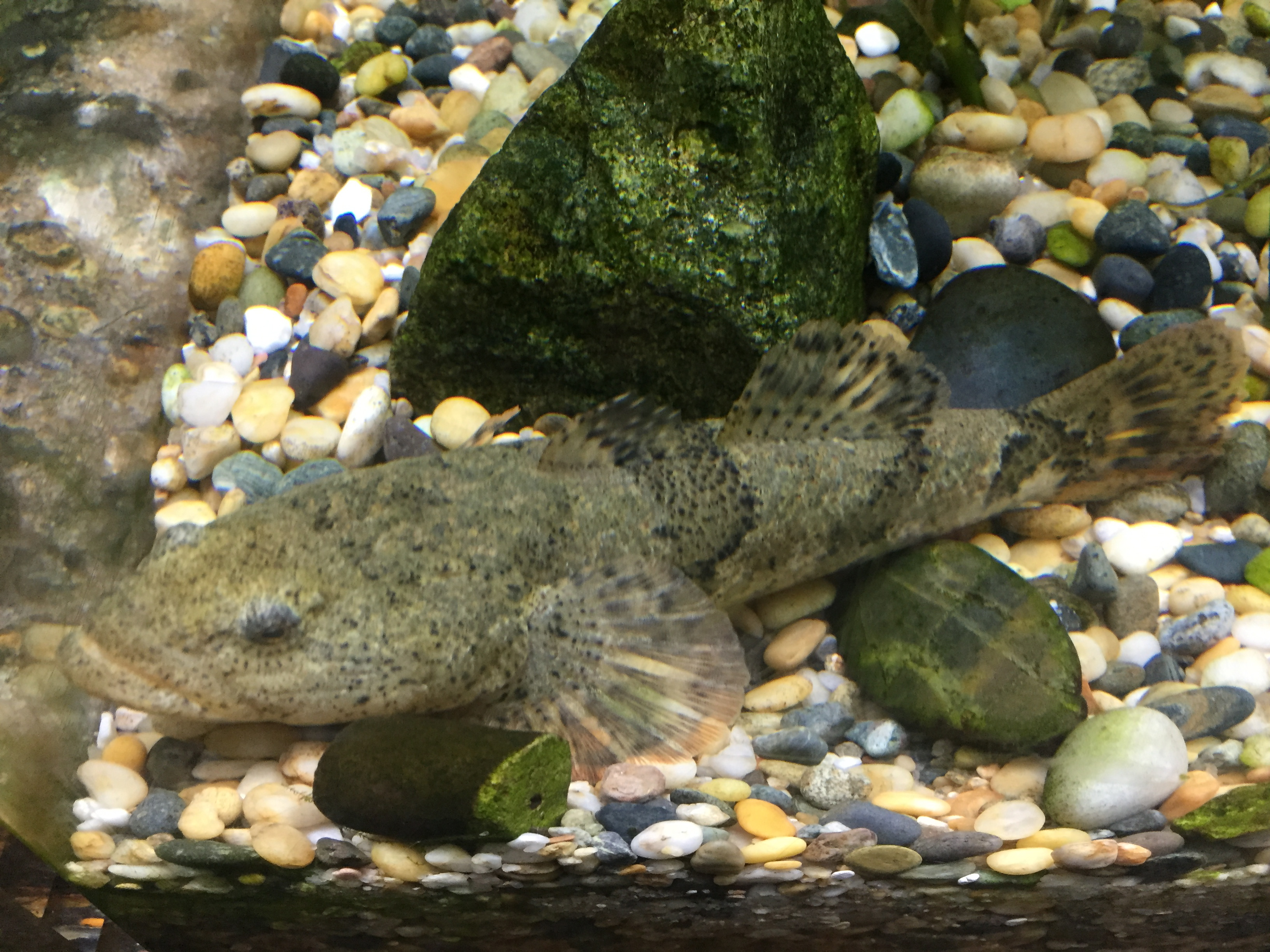

Scientific classification
- Kingdom: Animalia
- Phylum: Chordata
- Class: Actinopterygii
- Division: Teleostei
- Order: Gobiiformes
- Family: Odontobutidae
- Genus: Odontobutis
- Species: O. platycephala

Binomial name
- Odontobutis platycephala Iwata & S. R. Jeon, 1985

= Odontobutis platycephala =

Species of fish

Odontobutis platycephala the Korean dark sleeper, is a species of freshwater ray-finned fish belonging to the family Odontobutidae, the Asian freshwater sleepers. This fish is endemic to Korea.

== Taxonomy ==
Odontobutis platycephala was first formally described in 1985 by Akihisa Iwata and Sang-Rin Jeon with its type locality given as Somchin River, Kyeso-ri, Maryong-myon, Chinan-gun, Chonrapuk-do, Korea, at 35°44'N, 127°20'E. This species is classified in the genus Odontobutis which was described in 1874 by Pieter Bleeker with Eleotris obscura Temminck & Schlegel 1845 designated as the type species, as well as being the type by monotypy. Within this genus this species is a sister to O. yaluensis. The genus Odontobutis is the type genus of the family Odontobutidae which is included in the suborder Gobioidei in the order Gobiiformes, which also includes the cardinalfishes and sand-divers.

== Etymology ==
Odontobutis platycephala is classified in the genus Odontobutis, this name combines donto, a Neo-Latin combining form of odoús, meaning "tooth", Bleeker did not explain what this alluded to, it may refer to the outer row of teeth, which are slightly enlarged compared to Butis, both genera were thought to be in the same family at the time this genus was named. The specific name , platycephala, means "flat head" an allusion to the large flattened headof this species.

== Description ==
Odontobutis platycephala has a fusiform body and it reaches a maximum total length of 20.2 cm (8.0 in). The head an front part of the body are round, become laterally compressed towards the tail. the falttened head has small eyes which are located on the top of the head. It has a large mouth with the lower jaw being longer than the upper. There are many sharp teeth on both jaws, none on the roof of the mouth. There is no lateral line, the gill opening is a small hole shape; and they are located on the top of the head. The large pectoral fin is round, as is the caudal fin. The background colour is dull yellowish brown with 3 large dark blotches on the flanks, the first one is under the first and second dorsal fins, the second is beneath the rear portion of second dorsal fin, and the final one is on the caudal peduncle.

== Distribution and habitat ==
Odontobutis platycephala is endemic to Korea where it occurs in almost all the rivers and streams, as well as lakes and ponds. It is only absent from the eastern flowing rivers in Gangwong Province. It is found on sand and pebble beds in the slow flowing waters of the mid and lower reaches of streams.

== Biology ==
Odontobutis platycephala is a nocturnal species, hiding during the day and becoming active at night. It feeds on on aquatic insects, crustaceans and fishes. They spawn between April and June, breeding males develop dark fins. The male readies a nest under a stone; cleaning it and defending a territory. The female attaches her eggs under the stone, the male then fertilises the eggs. The male guards eggs until they hatch, which takes around a month. The juveniles adopt adult shape at a body length of 7 to 8 mm (0.28 to 0.31 in).

== Utilisation ==
Odontobutis platycephala is a popular food fish in Korea, as well as being popular in the fishkeeping hobby there.
