= Odontobutis haifengensis =

Conservation status
- Least Concern (IUCN 3.1)

Scientific classification
- Kingdom: Animalia
- Phylum: Chordata
- Class: Actinopterygii
- Division: Teleostei
- Order: Gobiiformes
- Family: Odontobutidae
- Genus: Odontobutis
- Species: O. haifengensis

Binomial name
- Odontobutis haifengensis W. Chen, 1985

Species of fish

Odontobutis haifengensis is a species of freshwater ray-finned fish belonging to the family Odontobutidae, the Asian freshwater sleepers. This fish is endemic to China.

== Taxonomy ==
Odontobutis haifengensis was first formally described in 1985 by the Chines ichthyologist Chen Wei with its type locality given as Lianhua Shan, Haifeng Xian, Guangdong Province, China. This species is classified in the genus Odontobutis which was described in 1874 by Pieter Bleeker with Eleotris obscura Temminck & Schlegel 1845 designated as the type species, as well as being the type by monotypy. The genus Odontobutis is the type genus of the family Odontobutidae which is included in the suborder Gobioidei in the order Gobiiformes, which also includes the cardinalfishes and sand-divers.

== Etymology ==
Odontobutis haifengensis is classified in the genus Odontobutis, this name combines donto, a Neo-Latin combining form of odoús, meaning "tooth", Bleeker did not explain what this alluded to, it may refer to the outer row of teeth, which are slightly enlarged compared to Butis, both genera were thought to be in the same family at the time this genus was named. The specific name , haifengensis, means "of Haifeng" the county in Guangdong Province in which the type locality is located.

== Description ==
Odontobutis haifengensis has a fusiform body and it reaches a maximum standard length of 10.7 cm (4.2 in).There are 5 dark transverse bands along the back. The body, upper part of the cheek and the gill cover, and the nape have ctenoid scales.

== Distribution and habitat ==
Odontobutis haifengensis is endemic to China where it occurs in the Lower Dong Jiang of Pearl River basin and several coastal rivers in eastern Guangdong Province, its range includes Hong Kong. It usually occurs in the lower lying streams.
