= Sineleotris =

Conservation status
- Least Concern (IUCN 3.1)

Scientific classification
- Kingdom: Animalia
- Phylum: Chordata
- Class: Actinopterygii
- Division: Teleostei
- Order: Gobiiformes
- Family: Odontobutidae
- Genus: Sineleotris; Herre, 1940
- Species: S. saccharae

Binomial name
- Sineleotris saccharae Herre, 1940

Monospecific genus of fishes

Sineleotris is a monospecific genus of freshwater ray-finned fish belonging to the family Odontobutidae, the Asian freshwater sleepers. The only species in the genus is Sineleotris saccharae, which is found in southern China and northern Vietnam.

== Taxonomy ==
Sineleotris was first formally described as a genus in 1940 by the American zoologist Albert William Herre whem he described its only species, S. saccharae, with its type locality given as New Territories, Hong Kong. Other species were added to the genus following Herre's description of it but more recently these have been trensferred to different genera within the same family. Sineleotris forms a clade within the family alongside Micropercops and Microdous, the remaining taxa in the family form the other clade. Sineleotris is classified in the family Odontobutidae which is included in the suborder Gobioidei in the order Gobiiformes, which also includes the cardinalfishes and sand-divers.

== Etymology ==
Sineleotris prefixes sine-, meaning "China", onto the genus name Eleotris, as this taxon was thought to be in the same family as Eleotris when Herre coined the name. The specific name, saccharae, is derived from saccharum a Neo-Latin word meaning "sugar", and means "of sugar", this honours the collector of the holotype Mr. B. E. Sugars, secretary of the Hong Kong Aquarium Society.

== Description ==
Sineleotris reaches a maximum total length of 10 cm (3.9 in). It has a total of 10 spines and 12 soft rays in its dorsal fins and its anal fin has a single spine and 8 soft rays.

== Distribution and habitat ==
Sineleotris is found in southern China and northern Vietnam. In China it has been recorded from Hainan, Guangdong, Guangxi and Hong Kong. Despite being common, this is a little known benthic fish of rivers.
