= Eriko Kishida =

Japanese poet

- 岸田 衿子
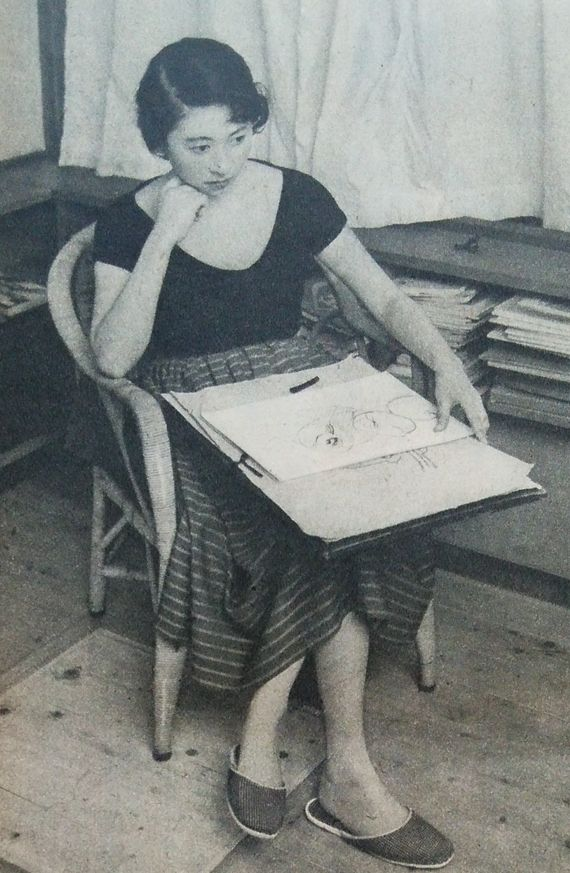
- Kishida in 1953
- Born: January 5, 1929; Suginami, Tokyo, Japan
- Died: April 7, 2011 (aged 82); Odawara, Japan
- Occupations: Poet, author, lyricist
- Notable work: Anne of Green Gables (1979 TV series) theme song lyrics Heidi, Girl of the Alps theme song lyrics

Eriko Kishida (岸田 衿子, Kishida Eriko, January 5, 1929 – April 7, 2011) was a Japanese poet, children's author, lyricist, and translator. She is known for writing the lyrics to popular animated children's television shows like Anne of Green Gables and Heidi, Girl of the Alps, as well as her children's picture books. Kishida was a member of the Kai group and published poetry in the "Kai" literary magazine founded by Noriko Ibaragi.

== Life ==
Eriko Kishida was born in Tokyo Prefecture (now Suginami Ward, Tokyo) as the eldest daughter of the playwright Kunio Kishida and Akiko Murakawa Kishida. Her younger sister was the actress Kyoko Kishida and her cousin was the actor Shin Kishida. Kishida was educated at Rikkyo Jogakuin Elementary School, then Rikkyo Jogakuin Girls' School. She attended Tokyo University of the Arts in the Department of Oil Painting, where she was classmates with close friend and collaborator, the artist Chiyoko Nakatani. Initially aspiring to be a painter, Kishida suffered from a respiratory disease and turned to writing and poetry as a career.

On October 4, 1954, Kishida married the poet Shuntaro Tanikawa. They divorced in October 1956. In 1963, she married Ryuichi Tamura and divorced in July 1969. She had at least one son.

For most of her life, Kishida lived and worked at the foot of Mount Asama in Gunma Prefecture, Japan. Although Kishida herself rarely wrote for adults, starting in her twenties she was active in writing picture books for young children, as well as translating English-language books into Japanese and writing poetry. Over the next fifty years, Kishida gained much respect and recognition as a poet and children's author, in both Japan and in the West. One of her earlier picture books, Kaeritekita Kitsune (1973), was illustrated by her close friend, Chiyoko Nakatani, and won the grand prize at the Sankei Children's Book Awards. Kishida collaborated with Nakatani on many of her children's books, including Kaba-kun.

Kishida published one of her first poetry collections, Wasureta Aki, in 1955, and went on to publish many other poems. Notably, she was a part of the "Kai" group affiliated with the poetry magazine of the same name, founded by Noriko Ibaragi in 1953. Some of Kishida's poetry collections include Akarui Hi no Uta ("Song of a Bright Day) and Sonatine no Ki ("The Tree of Sonatina).

In addition to her published work, Kishida wrote the lyrics for the theme songs of four animated works that aired on the Fuji TV's television show World Masterpiece Theater: Heidi, Girl of the Alps, A Dog of Flanders, Rascal the Raccoon, and Anne of Green Gables.

Kishida continued to publish until she died of meningioma on April 7, 2011, at a hospital in Odawara, Kanagawa Prefecture, Japan at the age of 82.

== Selected works ==
=== Publications ===
- Trees: A Collection of Poems and Paintings (co-authored with Minoru Nakamura, Eureka) 1954
- Wasureta Autumn (Eureka) 1955 - collection of poems
- The Lion Story (Shoshi Eureka) 1957 - Poetry collection
- Kabakun (illustration by Chiyoko Nakatani, Fukuinkan Shoten) 1966
- Japanese Birthplace (Iwasaki Shoten) 1967
- A Little Camel Hungry (illustration by Naga Shinta, Komine Shoten) 1968
- Uncle Noah's Box (illustrations by Chiyoko Nakatani, Iwasaki Shoten) 1969
- Geojio's Birthday (illustration by Chiyoko Nakatani, Akane Shobo) 1970
- Baby's Picture Book 5 volumes (illustrations by Shinta Naga, Hikari no Kuni) 1970
- Let's Play (Shufunotomosha) 1972
- Sleepy Cat (illustration by Seiichi Horiuchi, Shufu to Seikatsusha) 1972
- Thank you everyone (illustration by Seiichi Horiuchi, Shufu to Seikatsusha) 1972
- The Fox Came Back (illustrated by Chiyoko Nakatani, published by Kodansha) 1973 - Winner of the Sankei Children's Publishing Culture Award Grand Prize
- Giogio's Bakery (illustration by Chiyoko Nakatani, Akane Shobo) 1975
- Crayon no Uta (Sanrio Publishing) 1976
- Someone Who Colored the Wind (Seidosha) 1977
- Geojio's Crown (Fukuinkan Shoten) 1978
- What Did You Eat? (Kose Publishing) 1978
- Songs of the Bright Days (Seidosha) 1979
- A Village Where No One Is in a Hurry (illustration by Chiyoko Nakatani, Education Publishing Center) 1980
- Was the Elephant Once a Baby? (Kaiseisha) 1980
- Sonatine Tree (illustration by Mitsumasa Anno, Seidosha) 1981
- Picking Strawberries: A Poetry and Picture Book for Children (illustrations by Yuriko Yamawaki, Fukuinkan Shoten) 1983
- Daughter of the Echo (photographed by Shoji Kakuta, Shobunkan) 1983
- Koneko (illustration by Ogi Taro, Fukuinkan Shoten) 1985
- Buy a Grass-Colored Ticket (Seidosha) 1987
- Onimaru and Tomoko to the Sea (illustrated by Seiichi Horiuchi, Bunka Publishing Bureau) 1987
- Onimaru's Helicopter (Bunka Publishing Bureau) 1987
- Blueberry Picking Days: News from a Mountain Hut for Two (co-authored with Kyoko Kishida, Tokuma Shoten) 1988, later renamed News from a Mountain Hut for Two (Bunshun Bunko)
- Is Hariemon's medicine delicious? The hedgehog doctor's big success (illustrated by Yasuji Mori, Tokuma Shoten) 1989
- Strange Hide-and-Seek: Children's Seasons and Play Songs (Nora Shoten) 1990
- Counting Songs (Illustrated by Suzuki Koji, Fukuinkan Shoten) 1990
- The Hippo's Boat (Fukuinkan Shoten) 1990
- The Elephant Bakery (Hikari no Kuni) 1992
- What's in Today's Lunch Box? (illustration by Yuriko Yamawaki, Fukuinkan Shoten) 1994
- Spring, Summer, Autumn, and Winter in the Forest: Found in the Oshigippa Forest (Poplar Publishing) 1994
- There's no need to rush (Dowaya) 1995
- Neko Neko Yanagi (Fukuinkan Shoten) 1996
- Who is this snowman? (Fukuinkan Shoten) 1997
- I Found You All (Fukuinkan Shoten) 1998
- Put on the soap and it's bubbling away (illustration by Yuriko Yamawaki, Fukuinkan Shoten) June 1999
- Wild Flower Road (illustration by Kazuho Furuya, Fukuinkan Shoten) March 2000
- News from Strawberries (illustrated by Kazuho Furuya, published by Fukuinkan Shoten) June 2001
- An Important Day (Rironsha) 2005 - Poetry collection
- Gugigasan and Fuhehosan (by Atsukoe Nishimura, published by Fukuinkan Shoten) July 2009
- Mojaranko (illustrated by Kazuho Furuya, published by Fukuinkan Shoten) January 2011
- Speaking of my father, speaking of my teacher (Kishida Kunio) Published in the July 1977 issue of the Quarterly Art Magazine - A three-way discussion with Kishida Kyoko and Furuyama Takao

=== Lyricist ===
- "Tell me/Wait and see" (composed by Takeo Watanabe) - Opening theme / Ending theme for the TV anime Heidi, Girl of the Alps
- "The Path of Dawn/It's Always There" (composed by Takeo Watanabe) - Opening/Ending theme for the TV anime A Dog of Flanders
- "Rock River/Come to Rascal" (composed by Takeo Watanabe) - TV anime Rascal the Raccoon OP/ED
- "Kikoeru Kazara/Unending Dream" (composed by Akira Miyoshi) - TV anime Anne of Green Gables OP/ED
- "Wind and Trees" (composed by Yoshinori Kurosawa) - Set piece for the elementary school division of the 64th NHK National School Music Competition
- "Yonde Iru" (written and arranged by Seiichiro Uno) - Theme song for the TV anime Manga Kodomo Bunko
- "Little Little" (Terashima Naohiko composition) - Children's song

=== Translations ===
- The Sand Fairies (translated by Nesbitt and Maeda Toyoji, Gakken) 1968
- The Red Balloon (Albert Lamorisse, Kaiseisha) 1968
- Look, You Can Hear It (LaVerne Johnson, Kaiseisha) 1969
- Doronkokobuta (Arnold Lobel, Bunka Publishing Bureau) 1971
- Harold's Mysterious Adventure (Crockett Johnson, Bunka Publishing Bureau) 1971
- Children of the Moonlit Night (written by Janice Mae Adley, illustrated by Maurice Sendak, Kodansha) 1972
- Harold and the Purple Crayon (Crockett Johnson, Bunka Publishing Bureau) 1972
- Harold the Magical Land (Crockett Johnson, Bunka Publishing Bureau) 1972
- Lucille is a Horse (Arnold Lobel, Bunka Publishing Bureau) 1974
- Monster Mac and the Magic Umbrella (Ellen Bruns, Ann Cook, Bunka Publishing Bureau) 1974
- Spring, Summer, Autumn, Winter (John Burningham, Holp Publishing) June 1976
- How Long Can Rubber Stretches? (Mike Thaler, Holp Publishing) September 1976
- My Little Chicken (Alice & Martin Provensen, Holp Publishing) September 1976
- Christmas is full of Santa Claus's beard (Roger Duvoisin, Yugakusha) December 1978
- Have You Seen the Red Bag? (Steven Kellogg, Kaiseisha) April 1978
- What's Wrong with the Moon? (E.M. Preston, Iwanami Shoten) September 1979
- Mrs. Trot and the Cat (Paul Galdon, Yugakusha) October 1979
- Country Diary (Edith Holden, co-translated by Maeda Toyoji, Sanrio) March 1980
- Kate Greenaway's Play Picture Book (Kate Greenaway, Rippushobo) August 1980
- Don't Cry, Bear (Frank Ash, Yugakusha) December 1980
- This is a bargain, Geraldine (Ellen Conford, Kokudosha) November 1980
- A Year at Kaedegaoka Farm (Alice & Martin Provensen, Holp Publishing) June 1980
- I Never Wanted a Baby (Martha Alexander, Kaiseisha) February 1980
- Someone play with me (Martha Alexander, Kaiseisha) April 1980
- The Story of the Village of Roses (Jill Barklem, Kodansha)
- The Story of the Village of Roses by the Stream May 1981
- When the Fruit Ripens: The Story of the Village of Roses May 1981
- Spring Picnic: The Story of the Village of Roses May 1981
- Snow Day Party: The Story of Nobara Village May 1981
- Spring, Summer, Autumn, Winter: The Story of the Village of Roses April 1986
- Wilfred's Mountain Climb: The Story of the Village of Roses October 1986
- The Story of the Village of Roses: The Story of the Sea August 1991
- Wilfred's Mountain Climbing: Tales of the Village of Roses 6 November 1992
- The Secret Staircase: The Story of Nobara Village November 1993
- Poppy's Baby: Tales of the Village of Roses 8 September 1994
- The Village of Roses: A Tale of Four Seasons April 1995
- Aunt Curly's Mysterious Garden (Ruth Kraft, Akane Shobo) June 1981
- Christmas is a Chaotic Life (Stephen Kroll, Yugakusha) December 1981
- Seven Rabbits (John Becker, Bunka Publishing Bureau) September 1982
- Children of the Moonlit Night (Janice May Adlai, Kodansha) December 1983
- Snow, Snow (Roy McKee, Penguin, First Book to Read Alone) January 1984
- The Owl and the Three Kittens (Alice & Martin Provensen, Holp Publishing) December 1985
- All of My Poems for My Young Children (edited by Dorothy Butler, co-translated by Yuriko Momo, Nora Shoten) October 1991
- Let's Build a House: A Poetry Collection for Kushla (edited by Dorothy Butler, co-translated by Yuriko Momo, Nora Shoten) December 1993
- Nature Notes (Edith Holden, co-translated by Maeda Toyoji, Sanrio) March 1991
- Mary Poppins (P. L. Travers, Kawade Shobo Shinsha) February 1993
- Kewpie's Little Stories (translated by Rose O'Neill and Koto Kishida, Froebel-kan) July 1999
- Minue the Kitten (Françoise, Nora Shoten) May 2006
- The King of Raspberry (by Zacharias Topelius, illustrated by Yuriko Yamawaki, Shueisha) February 2011
