= Sankei Children's Book Award =

Japanese literary award for children's literature

- Awarded for: "the most distinguished Japanese Children's literature, picture book for children"
- Country: Japan
- Presented by: Sankei Shimbun, Fujisankei Communications Group, Japan Railways Group
- First award: 1954
- Website: https://www.sankei.com/feature/child_award/index.html

Sankei Children's Book Award (産経児童出版文化賞, Sankei jido shuppan bunka sho), literally "Sankei Children's Publishing Culture Award", is a major and the oldest children's literary awards in Japan.

The Sankei Children's Book Award annually recognizes the preceding year's "most distinguished Japanese Children's literature, picture book for children", beginning with 1954 publications.

The Awards is selected from among all the children's books published in Japan of the previous year. The Awards are announced on Children's Day on May 5 every year. The award ceremony are held at the end of May or early June, and "Kiko, Princess Akishino" attends the ceremony.

== Recipients ==
- Grand Prize - Newly established in 1961

Shōwa period

The 8th (1961) - 世界童話文学全集 1 (Sekai Dowa bungaku Zenshu 1)(World Children's Literature Complete Works Volume 1) - (Supervisor : Yoshishige Abe) published by Kodansha

The 9th (1962) - * No corresponding work

The 10th (1963) - こどものとも (Kodomo No Tomo)(Children's Friend) - published by Fukuinkan Shoten

The 11th (1964) - 科学図説シリーズ（全12巻） (Kagaku Zusetsu Shiriizu)(Science illustration series - all 12 volumes) - published by Shogakukan

The 12th (1965) - アンデルセン童話全集（全8巻） (Anderusen Dowa Zenshu)(Andersen's Fairytales Complete Works - All 8 Volumes) - (Author: Andersen) published by Kodansha

The 13th (1966) - 少年少女日本昆虫記（全5巻） (Shonen Shojo Nippon Konchuki)(Japanese insects for Boys and girls - All 5 volumes) - (Author : Mutsuo Kato-biologists) published by Maki Shoten

The 14th (1967) - 与田準一全集（全6巻） (Yoda Jun'ichi Zenshu)(Jun'ichi Yoda's Complete Works - All 5 volumes) - (Author : Jun'ichi Yoda) published by Dainippon Tosho

The 15th (1968) - 千葉省三童話全集 1 (Chiba Shozo Dowa Zenshu) (Shozo Chiba's Fairytales Complete Works, Volume 1) - (Author : Shozo Chiba - literature writer) published by Iwasaki Shoten

The 16th (1969) - * No corresponding work

The 17th (1970) - かっぱとドンコツ (Kappa To Donkotsu) (Kappa (folklore) and Dark sleeper - (author: Tsubota Joji) published by Kodansha

The 18th (1971) - 心の灯 考古学への情熱 (Kokoro No Tomoshibi Koukogaku He No Jonetsu) (Light of mind, The Passion for Archeology) - (Author : Eiichi Fujimori - Archaeologist : published by Chikuma Shobo

The 19th (1972) - 鬼を飼うゴロ (Oni Wo Kau Goro) (Goro who keeps demons) - (Author : Yao Kitabatake) - published by Jitsugyo no Nihon Sha

The 20th (1973) - かちかち山のすぐそばで (Kachi-kachi Yama No Sugu Sobade) (In the immediate side of the mountain Kachi-kachi Yama(Fire-Crackle Mountain)) - (author : Keisuke Tsutsui / picture : Yasuo Segawa ) published by froebel kan

The 21st (1974) - かえってきたきつね (Kaettekita Kitsune) (The fox came back) - (author : Eriko Kishida / illustrator : Chiyoko Nakatani ) published by Kodansha

The 22nd (1975) - 海と少年 (Umi To Shonen) (Sea and boy) - (author : Kazuo Yamamoto / illustrator : Yoshiharu Suzuki ) published by Rironsha

The 23rd (1976) - 科学のアルバム（全50巻、別巻2巻） (Kagaku No Arubamu) (Albums of Science -, all 50 volumes and 2 Separate volumes) - published by Akane Shobo

The 24th (1977) - 龍のいる島 (Ryu No Iru Shima) (Island with Dragon)- (author : Yoichi Takashi / illustrator : Daihachi Ota ) published by Alice Kan

The 25th (1978) - 中国の古典文学 全14巻 (Chugoku No Koten Bungaku) (Chinese Classical Literature - all 14 Volume) - published by Saela Shobo

The 26th (1979) - オトシブミ (Kaettekita Kitsune) (Attelabidae) (Insects) (author & photo : Yasunosuke Chikuni) - published by kaiseisha

The 27th (1980) - * No corresponding work

The 28th (1981) - はるかなる黄金帝国 (Haruka Naru Ogon Teikoku) (Beyond the Golden Empire) - (author : Keiko Yanagiya / illustrator : Takaya Ono ) published by Obunsha

The 29th (1982) - 大どろぼうブラブラ氏 (OoDorobou BuraBuraShi) (Great Thief Mr.wander)) - (author : Eiko Kadono / illustrator : Akira Odagiri ) published by Kodansha

The 30th (1983) - はじめてであうすうがくの絵本 全3冊 (Hajimete Deau Sugaku No Hon) (the picturebook for mathematics for the first time - All 3 volumes)- (author : Mitsumasa Anno ) published by Fukuinkan Shoten

The 31st (1984) - * No corresponding work

The 32nd (1985) - 日本の子どもの詩 全47巻 (Nipponn No Kodomo No Uta) (Poems of Children of Japan - all 47 Volumes) - published by Iwasaki Shoten

The 33rd (1986) - ちくま少年図書館 全100巻 (Chikuma Shonen Toshokan) ("Chikuma Boys Library - All 100 Volumes) - published by Chikuma Shobo

The 34th (1987) - りょうちゃんとさとちゃんのおはなし 全5巻 (Ryo-chan To Sato-chan No Ohanashi) (Ryo-chan & Sato-chan's Tales - all 5 volumews) - (author : Masako Matsuno ) published by Dainippon Tosho

The 35th (1988) - 植物の研究・植物たちの富士登山 (Shokubutu No Kenkyu Shokubutu Tachi No Fuji Tozan) (Research of Plants climbing Mt. Fuji of plants) - (author & photo : Kiyoshi Shimizu ) published by Akane Shobo

== See also ==
- Praemium Imperiale - an international art prize
- Kiko, Princess Akishino - the imperial family of Japan
- Akemi Chan Fund - (Japanese: 明美ちゃん基金, Akemi Chan Kikin) is a Japan-based Medical Fund for the poor children suffering heart troubles.
- Sankei Shimbun - daily newspaper in Japan
- Fujisankei Communications Group - Sankei Shimbun and Fuji Television, the largest media conglomerate in Japan
- Japan Railways Group - Former Japanese National Railways
