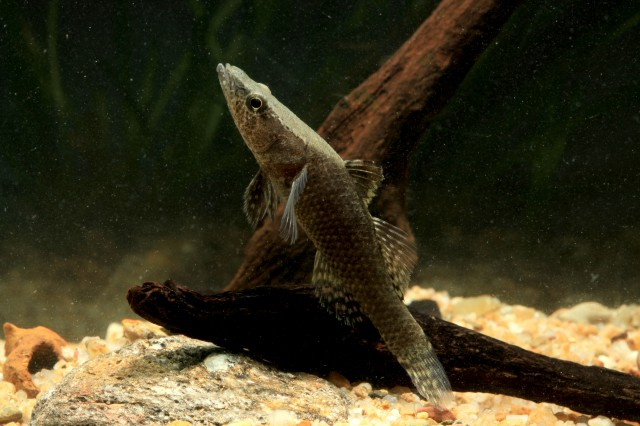

Scientific classification
- Kingdom: Animalia
- Phylum: Chordata
- Class: Actinopterygii
- Order: Gobiiformes
- Family: Butidae
- Genus: Butis
- Species: B. humeralis

Binomial name
- Butis humeralis (Valenciennes, 1837)

Synonyms
- Eleotris humeralis Valenciennes, 1837

= Butis humeralis =

Species of fish

Butis humeralis, commonly known as the dark sleeper or olive flathead-gudgeon, is a fish native to the waters of Indonesia and Indochina. Found in salt, brackish and fresh water, it reaches a standard length of 14.2 cm. It closely resembles the crazy fish (Butis butis), but is more solid in build and never has two black spots at the base of its pectoral fins.
