= Odontobutis hikimius =

Conservation status
- Near Threatened (IUCN 3.1)

Scientific classification
- Kingdom: Animalia
- Phylum: Chordata
- Class: Actinopterygii
- Division: Teleostei
- Order: Gobiiformes
- Family: Odontobutidae
- Genus: Odontobutis
- Species: O. hikimius

Binomial name
- Odontobutis hikimius Iwata & H. Sakai, 2002

Species of fish

Odontobutis hikimius is a species of freshwater ray-finned fish belonging to the family Odontobutidae, the Asian freshwater sleepers. This fish is endemic to Japan.

== Taxonomy ==
Odontobutis hikimius was first formally described in 2002 by the Japanese ichthyologists Akihisa Iwata and Harumi Sakai with its type locality given as the Hikimi River, Hikimi-cho, Mino-gun, Shimane Prefecture Japan at 34°52'N, 131°48'E. This species is classified in the genus Odontobutis which was described in 1874 by Pieter Bleeker with Eleotris obscura Temminck & Schlegel 1845 designated as the type species, as well as being the type by monotypy. The genus Odontobutis is the type genus of the family Odontobutidae which is included in the suborder Gobioidei in the order Gobiiformes, which also includes the cardinalfishes and sand-divers.

== Etymology ==
Odontobutis hikimius is classified in the genus Odontobutis, this name combines donto, a Neo-Latin combining form of odoús, meaning "tooth", Bleeker did not explain what this alluded to, it may refer to the outer row of teeth, which are slightly enlarged compared to Butis, both genera were thought to be in the same family at the time this genus was named. The specific name , hikimius, is a Latinisation of Hikimi, a name Sakai had given for one of five geographic groups of O. obscura, it refers to the Hikimi River, Shimane Prefecture, Japan, i.e. the type locality.

== Description ==
Odontobutis hikimius has a fusiform body and it reaches a maximum standard length of 15.6 cm (6.1 in). The first dorsal fin is supported by 7 spines, the second contains 1 spine and 7 softrays, while the anal fin has a single spine and 7 soft rays. The head and body have a dark brown background colour which may be broken by darker saddle markings on the back. There is a dark spot on the uper edge of the gill slite. The head has a number o yellowish white spots on its lower surface, a dark band runs from the eye onto the front of the gill cover and there are dark spots on all the fins, some arranged in irregular rwos. The iris os gold coloured witha mottling of small dark spots.

== Distribution and habitat ==
Odontobutis hikimius is endemic to Honshu, the largest island of Japan, here it is known to occusr in the Hikimi, Fukukawa, Takashiri, Masuda and Tama Streams. The Hikimi, Fukukawa and Takashiri Streams are tributaries within the Takatsu River drainage system, it has only been recorded from the Shimane and Yamaguchi Prefectures. It inhabitrs the greval beds of fast flowing, cool water streams.
