= Chiyoko Nakatani =

Japanese painter and picture book author

- 中谷千代子
- Born: January 16, 1930; Tokyo, Japan
- Died: December 26, 1981 (aged 51); Toshima, Tokyo, Japan
- Education: Tokyo School of Fine Arts
- Occupations: Author and illustrator
- Notable work: Kaba-kun (1962)

Chiyoko Nakatani (中谷千代子, Nakatani Chiyoko, January 16, 1930 - December 26, 1981) was a Japanese picture book author and illustrator. During the Shōwa era, Nakatani was one of the artists to popularize Japanese children's books outside of Japan.

== Personal life ==
Nakatani was born in Tokyo, Japan. She graduated from Tokyo Prefectural Girls' High School (now Tokyo Metropolitan Sakuracho High School) and studied oil painting at the Tokyo University of the Arts under Ryusaburo Umehara. She was classmates and close friends with poet Eriko Kishida, and went on to illustrate several of her picture books.

After graduating, Nakatani married Sadahiko Nakatani, who had also studied at the Tokyo University of the Arts.

Nakatani died from heart failure on December 26, 1981, at a hospital in Toshima, Tokyo, at the age of 51.

== Career ==
After graduating in 1952, Nakatani taught children's art classes at elementary schools classes and took part in local and national exhibitions of her oil paintings. In 1957, she developed an interest in picture books and, inspired by the work of Fukuinkan Shoten and its editor-in-chief Nao Matsui, decided to make her own.

Nakatani debuted as a picture book author and illustrator alongside Eriko Kishida when they published Geogeo's Crown in 1960. The two of them would go on to collaborate on several other children's books together, including Kaettekita Kitsune (The Returned Fox), which won the 21st Sankei Children's Book Award in 1974. Kaba-kun (1962), was their first book to receive international attention and translations in European and American countries. They were among the first Japanese children's book authors to gain that level of popularity in the West. Nakatani's work has been translated into many languages.

In 1963, Nakatani and her husband spent a year in France, where she studied picture books and met fellow children's book artists Père Castor and Bettina Hürlimann. She visited France again in 1973 and 1976 to gain inspiration for her books.

Throughout her life, Nakatani created over 105 books for children, both as a collaborator and as the only author. Some of the picture books that she wrote and illustrated alone were Taro and the Dolphin (1969) and the Ken-chan Picture Book series, whose protagonist was based on her nephew.

In 1981, she served as a judge for various new children's illustration awards, before dying in April. Nakatani was a versatile and skilled artist who valued realism, wanting to appeal to adults as well as children. She worked primarily with oil paints.

Nakatani's illustration from Sugan-san no Yagi (The Brave Little Goat of Monsieur Se'guin, 1966) is currently displayed at the Chihiro Iwasaki Museum, which exhibits the work of picture book artists from around the world. The museum describes Nakatani as "a pioneer of the overseas publication of Japanese picture books."

== Selected works ==
- GeoGeo's Crown (Kodomo no Tomo, 1960) - illustration; written by Eriko Kishida
- Kaba-kun (Hippopotamus) (Kodomo no Tomo, 1962) - illustration; written by Eriko Kishida
- Sugan-san no Yagi (The Brave Little Goat of Monsieur Se'guin, 1966)
- Taro and the Dolphin (1969) - illustration and story
- The day Chiro was lost (1969)
- Fumio and the Dolphins (1970)
- Little Momo first edition - illustration; written by Miyoko Matsutani
- Boku no uchi no dōbutsuen (The zoo in my garden) (1973)
- Kaettekita Kitsune (The Returned Fox) (Kodansha, 1974) - illustrated; written by Eriko Kishida
- My Day on the Farm (1976)
- My Teddy Bear (1976)
- My Treasures (1979)
- My Animal Friends (1979)
- Jo jo no Kanmuri (The Lion and the Birds Nest)
- Animal Opposites (1981)
- Feeding Babies (Picture Puffin) (1981)
- Shirokichi and Yuki (1981)

== Awards ==
- 1965: The Lost Chiro and The Hippo's Boat won the 14th Shogakukan Art Award
- 1967: The English translation of Sugan-san no Yagi (1966) was selected as the best work at the Chicago Tribune/Washington Post Children's Book Festival
- 1969: The Town Mouse and the Country Mouse won the 1st Kodansha Publishing Culture Award
- 1974: Kaettekita Kitsune won the 21st Sankei Children's Book Award Grand Prize
- 1979: The Tortoise's Walk won the 26th Sankei Children's Book Culture Award for Recommended Book

== External resources ==
- Chiyoko Nakatani at Chihiro Art Museum
