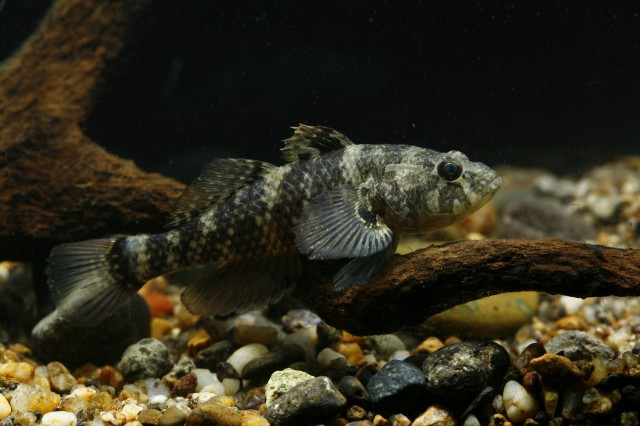

Scientific classification
- Kingdom: Animalia
- Phylum: Chordata
- Class: Actinopterygii
- Order: Gobiiformes
- Family: Butidae
- Genus: Butis
- Species: B. koilomatodon

Binomial name
- Butis koilomatodon (Bleeker, 1849)

Synonyms
- Eleotris koilomatodon Bleeker, 1849; Prionobutis koilomatodon (Bleeker, 1849); Eleotris caperatus Cantor, 1849; Butis caperatus (Cantor, 1849); Eleotris delagoensis Barnard, 1927; Hypseleotris raji Herre, 1945

= Butis koilomatodon =

Species of fish

Butis koilomatodon, commonly known as the mudsleeper, is a species of fish in the family Butidae native to fresh, brackish and salt water of the Indo-Pacific region, ranging from Madagascar and Mozambique to the Philippines, China and Australia. It has been introduced to the Atlantic region where considered invasive and known from Panama, Venezuela and Brazil as well as Nigeria. This predatory species mainly lives in rivers, estuaries and mangroves, and reaches up to 10.7 cm (4.2 in) in total length.

== Introduction to Brazil ==
B. koilomatodon are expanding their range to the southwestern Atlantic along the coast of Brazil. It has been found on the eastern coast of Brazil, in 1989, but was not identified until 2000. As of the summer of 2012, 23 specimens of B. koilomatodon have been collected along the coast of Brazil, all specimens were collected at six different locations along the coast. Biologists have been able to identify 17 of the specimens as male, four as female, and two more were not able to be sexed. And many of the specimens were in different stages of maturity, a breeding population is likely to be established, but enough data are collected to conclude it finally. How this species got to the other side of the continent of South America is unclear. Many believe they were brought over in the ballast tanks of ships. The small size of the species makes it very easy for them to enter the intake holes on a ship's ballast tank. Also, their ability to tolerate a wide range of salinity levels, as well as temperature fluctuations, makes it likely for them to inhabit a ballast tank on journeys across the ocean.
