= Guri and Gura =

Japanese series of children's books by Rieko Nakagawa and Yuriko Yamawaki

- Cover of US edition of the first volume, 2002
- Author: Rieko Nakagawa
- Original title: ぐりとぐら
- Illustrator: Yuriko Yamawaki
- Cover artist: Yuriko Yamawaki
- Country: Japan
- Language: Japanese
- Genre: Children's literature
- Publisher: Fukuinkan Shoten
- Published: 1963
- Published in English: 1967
- Media type: Print
- No. of books: 14

Guri and Gura (ぐりとぐら, Guri to Gura) is a Japanese series of children's books by writer Rieko Nakagawa and illustrator Yuriko Yamawaki. The protagonists are two anthropomorphic field mice, and the series began in 1963 with the first volume Guri and Gura. The series is published by Fukuinkan Shoten in Japan.

== Overview ==
The stories tell of the encounters of twin anthropomorphic field mice, Guri and Gura. Yamawaki accompanies Nakagawa's loosely structured narratives with simple, unsophisticated illustrations. The stories aim at entertaining rather than instructing and thus do not feature moral dilemmas to be overcome.

== Publication and reception ==
The first volume of the series, titled Guri and Gura, appeared in the children's magazine Kodomo no Tomo in 1963. The series' writer Rieko Nakagawa (Note: 中川李枝子 Nakagawa Rieko) worked in childcare at the time. As of 2014, the first volume had sold over four million copies, and the series had sold a combined 24.9 million copies worldwide.

The first English of Guri and Gura appeared in Britain in 1967; in this translation the castella cake the mice make in the original Japanese becomes a sponge cake more familiar to a British audience. A translation appeared in 1991 under the subtitle The Giant Egg, by an uncredited translator. Later translations have been by Peter Howlett and Richard McNamara. Dozens of other translations have appeared, including Korean, French, Portuguese, Thai, and Esperanto.

== List of translated volumes ==
- Guri and Gura: The Giant Egg
- Guri and Gura
- Guri and Gura's Surprise Visitor
- Guri and Gura's Seaside Adventure
- Guri and Gura's Picnic Adventure
- Guri and Gura's Magical Friend
- Guri and Gura's Playtime Book of Seasons
- Guri and Gura's Special Gift
- Guri and Gura's Spring Cleaning
- Guri and Gura's Songs of the Seasons
