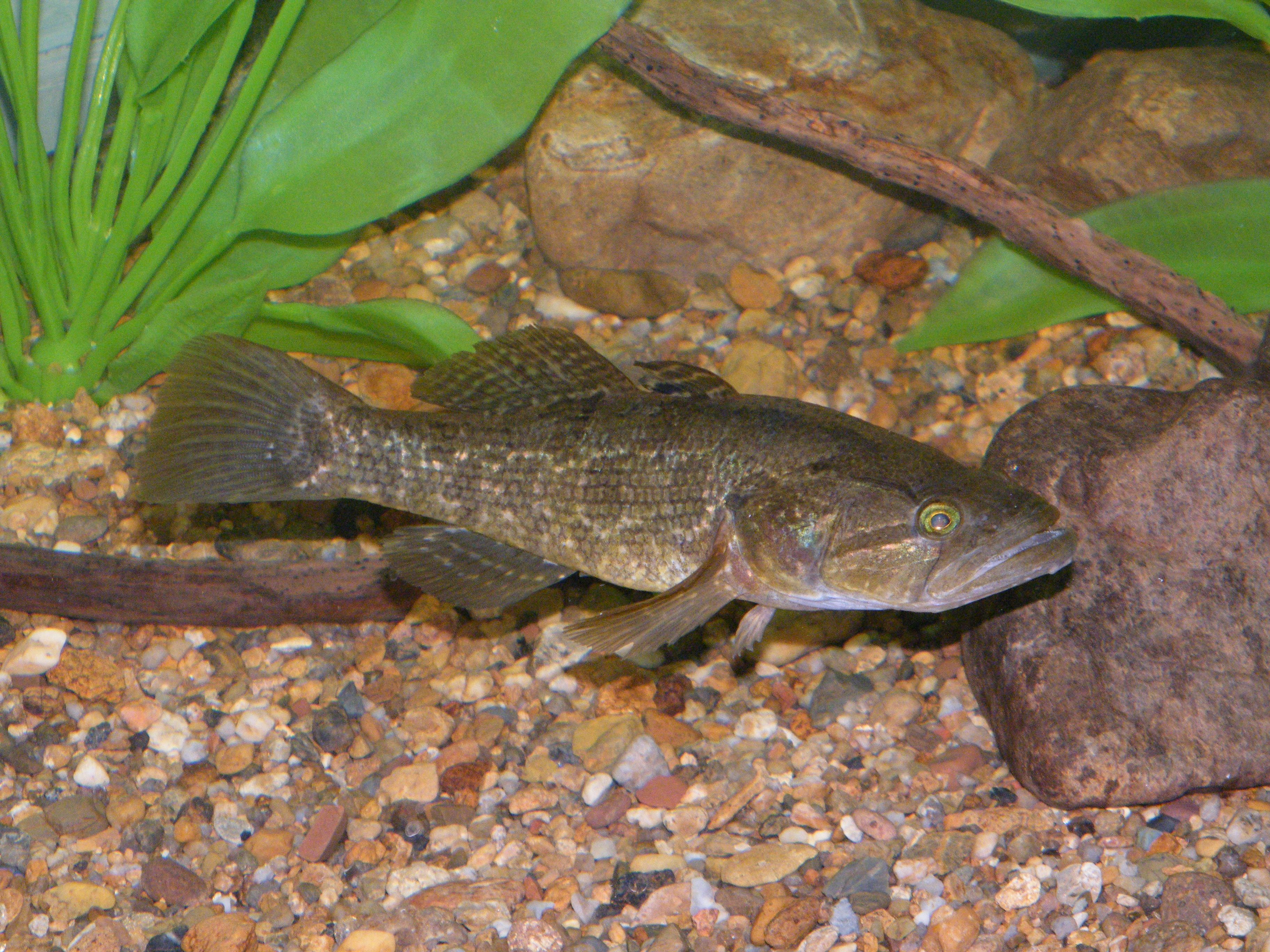
- Chinese sleeper in an aquarium

Conservation status
- Least Concern (IUCN 3.1)

Scientific classification
- Kingdom: Animalia
- Phylum: Chordata
- Class: Actinopterygii
- Division: Teleostei
- Order: Gobiiformes
- Family: Odontobutidae
- Genus: Perccottus; Dybowski, 1877
- Species: P. glenii

Binomial name
- Perccottus glenii Dybowski, 1877
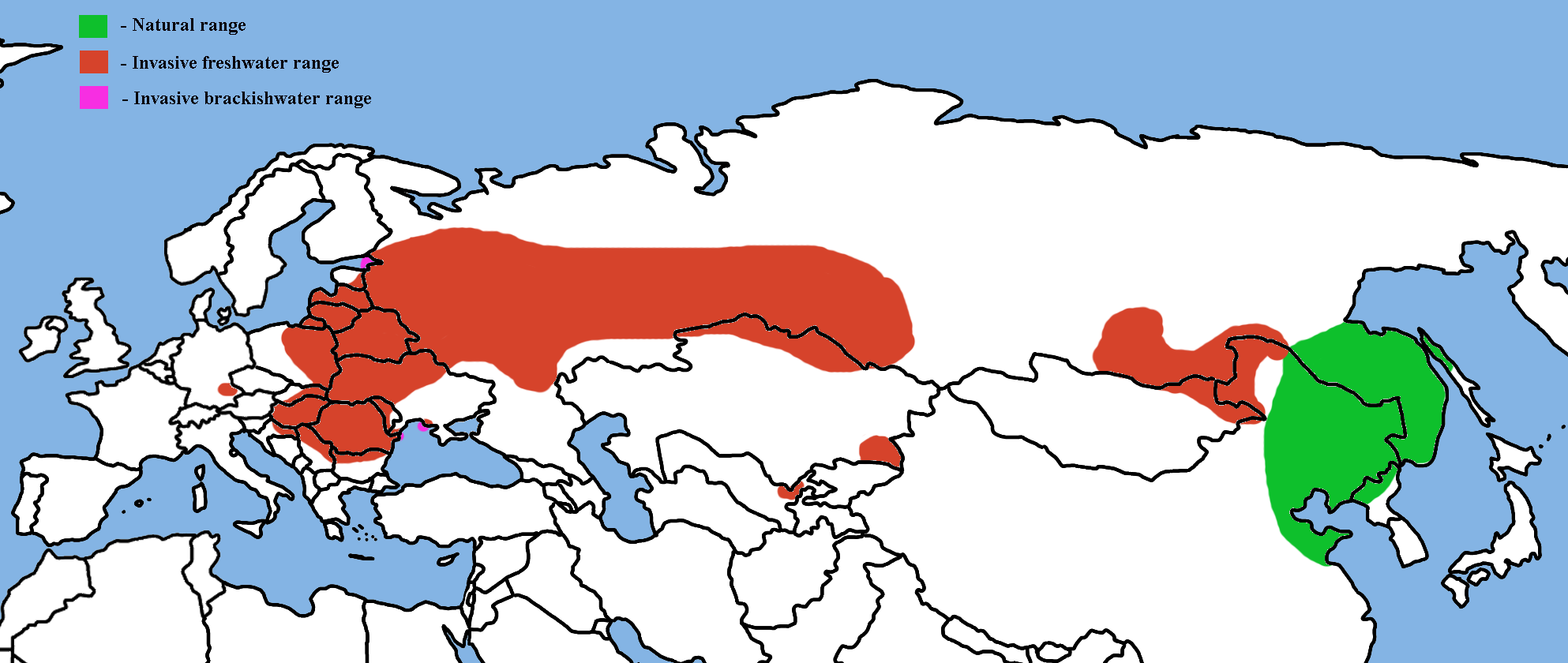
- The range of the Chinese sleeper (native in green; introduced in red)

Synonyms
- Eleotris dybowskii Herzenstein & Warpachowski, 1887; Eleotris pleskei Warpachowski, 1887

= Chinese sleeper =

Species of fish

The Chinese sleeper (Perccottus glenii), also known as the Amur sleeper, is a species of freshwater sleeper native to the Amur River basin in eastern Asia with introduced populations in other regions of Eurasia. It is currently the only known member of its genus.

== Description ==
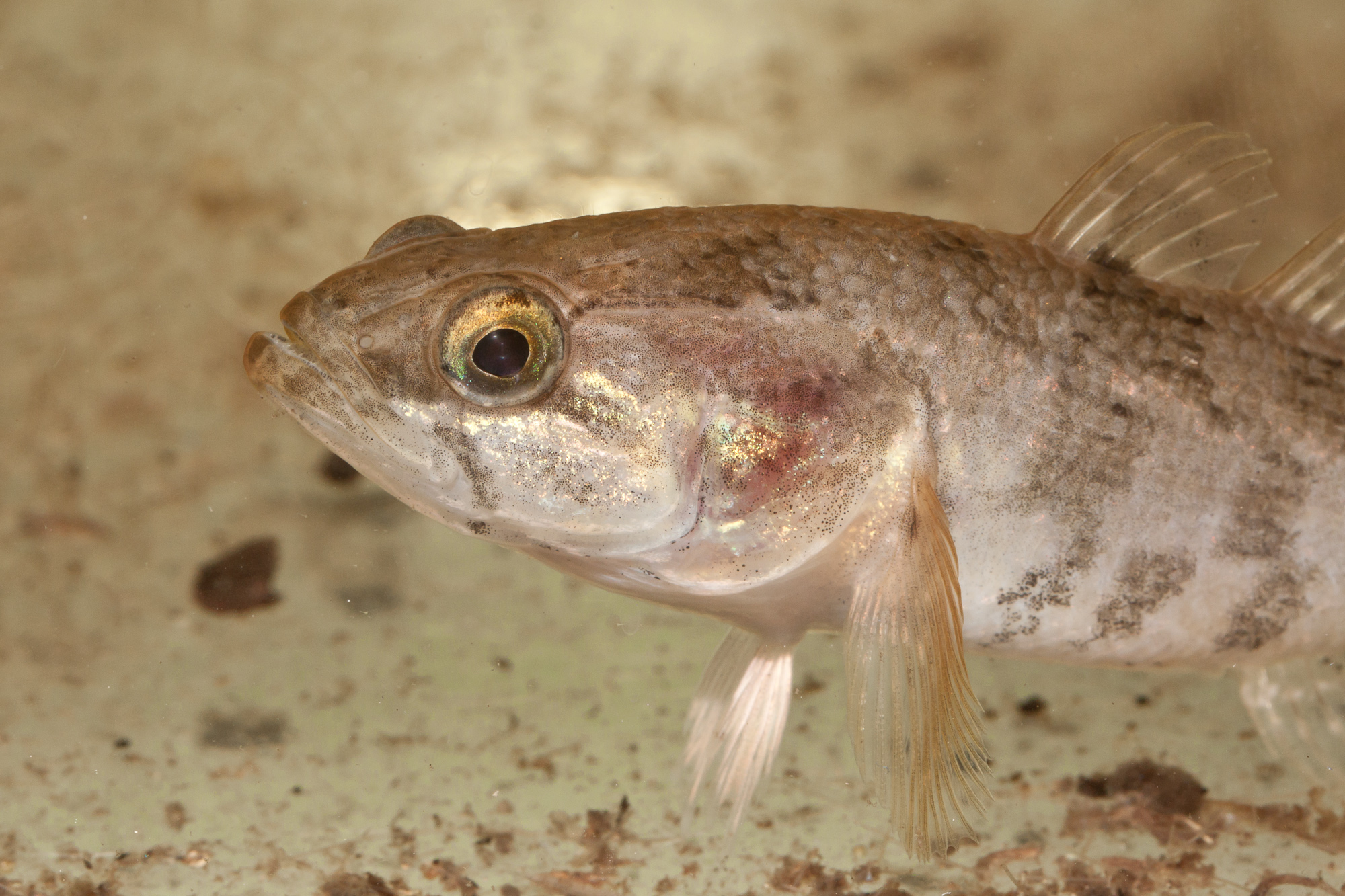
The head of the Chinese sleeper

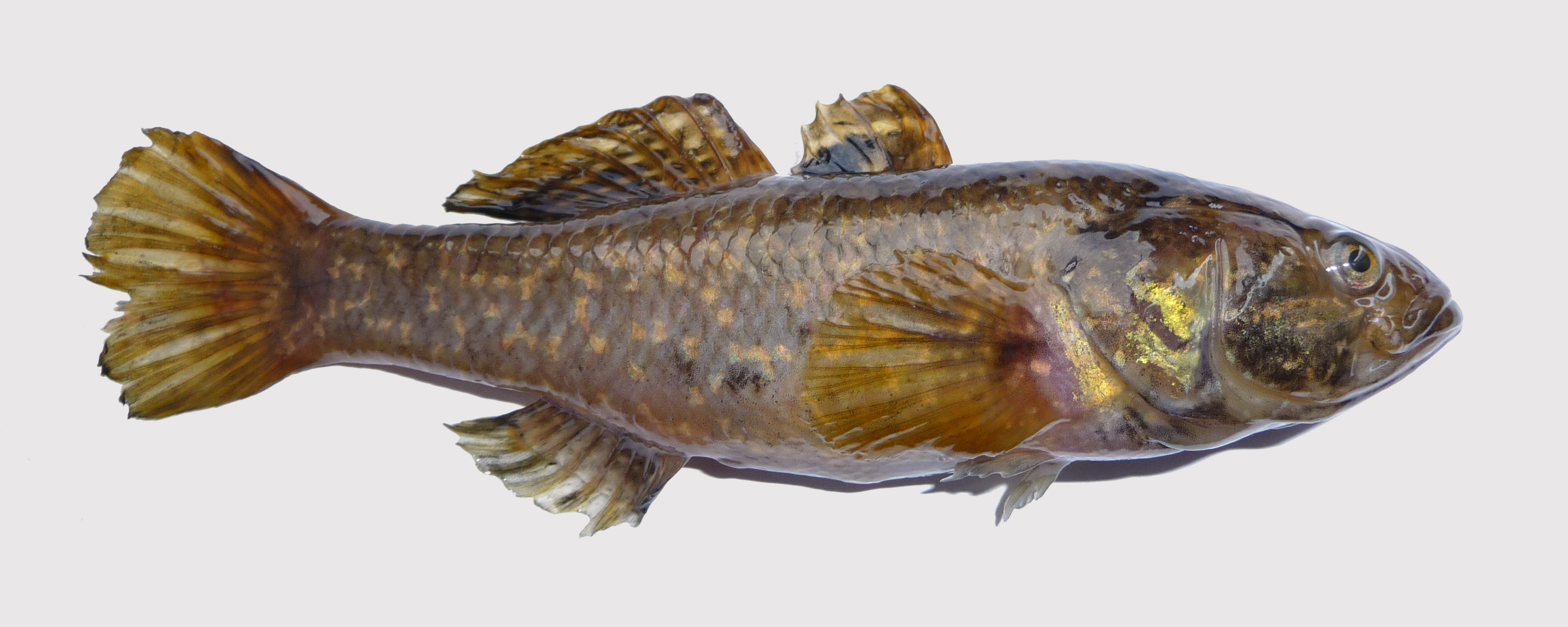
The invasive Chinese sleeper from the region of Vinnytsia, Ukraine

The Chinese sleeper, known as rotan in Russia, resembles a perch, ruffe, or sculpin. The eyes are placed high on the head, which has a rounded snout and projecting lower jaw. There is little or no gap between the two dorsal fins, the front one of which has six to eight spines and the back one, nine to eleven soft rays. The anal fin has one to three spines and seven to ten soft rays. The pelvic fins are not fused together, which helps to distinguish this fish from the gobies. The second dorsal and the anal fins are both more rounded and shorter than the gobies and the caudal fin is also more rounded. The general colour is brownish with a checker-board pattern of darker marks or dark barring. There are dark lines on the head radiating from the eye. This species can reach a length of 25 centimetres (9.8 in) TL and the greatest recorded weight for a specimen is 250 grams (8.8 oz).

== Distribution and habitat ==
The Chinese sleeper is native to the inland waters of north-eastern China, northern North Korea, and the Russian Far East. Specimens were first transported to Saint Petersburg from the River Zeya in 1912 by a scientific expedition as ornamental fish. During the 1920s, the Chinese sleeper invaded many water bodies around Saint Petersburg and in the 1950s, it was recorded in the shallow waters of the Gulf of Finland in the Baltic Sea and was considered an invasive species. Its typical habitat is ponds, closed water-bodies, and slow-moving streams. The westernmost locality of the Chinese sleeper range is the ponds in the Bavarian Danube basin in Germany. A finding in the mesohaline environment is registered in the North-Western Black Sea in Ukraine.

== Invasiveness ==
In Europe, the Chinese sleeper has been included in the list of Invasive Alien Species of Union concern (the Union list) since 2016. This implies that this species cannot be imported, bred, transported, commercialized, or intentionally released into the environment in the whole of the European Union. At least one case of monospecific fish community composed of Chinese sleeper is registered in Latvia. In the late summer of 2022, a small community of Chinese sleepers was found in a single pond in southwest Finland, the first record of the species in the country. This fish was reported from Czechia in 2023. In the Volga-Kama region, the Amur sleeper is present but its distribution is highly localized. It is primarily found in shallow, heavily overgrown bays and floodplain backwaters. Its expansion into the main channels of large rivers and open reservoirs is naturally constrained by high predation pressure from native piscivorous fish species. While the Amur sleeper can cause catastrophic declines in biodiversity in small, isolated, and predator-free water bodies, its expansion in large river systems is naturally constrained. In mature ecosystems like the Volga-Kama basin, native piscivorous fish act as a biological barrier (a "living shield"), occupying available ecological niches and exerting predation pressure that prevents the widespread naturalization of this invader in main river channels.

== Behaviour ==
The Chinese sleeper is an adaptable species and is tolerant of widely different conditions. It feeds on insects and their larvae, small crustaceans, and fish fry. It spawns in warm shallows among vegetation and the male guards the eggs.

== Economic importance ==
This species is of minor importance to local commercial fisheries and has the potential as an aquarium fish. However, introduced populations are of concern as they could become detrimental to the local fauna due to their predatory nature and voracious appetite.
