= Rieko Nakagawa =

Japanese writer and lyricist (1935–2024)

- 中川李枝子
- Born: 大村李枝子 (Rieko Ōmura); September 29, 1935; Sapporo, Hokkaido, Japan
- Died: October 14, 2024 (aged 89)
- Education: Tokyo Metropolitan High School Nursery School Academy
- Occupation: Writer
- Writing career
- Language: Japanese
- Period: 1962–2024
- Genres: Children's literature, essays
- Notable works: Guri and Gura; Sora Iro no Tane

Rieko Nakagawa (中川李枝子, Nakagawa Rieko; September 29, 1935 – October 14, 2024) was a Japanese children's literature writer and lyricist. Her first work, Iyayaen, was published in 1962, and she published over 30 books since then. She had won multiple awards for her works, including the Kikuchi Kan Prize.

Nakagawa wrote the lyrics for the opening theme song for the 1988 Studio Ghibli film My Neighbor Totoro as well as to another song used in the film. She wrote the lyrics for over 20 other songs, including "Yūki" sung by Mana Ashida for the 81st NHK All Japan School Singing Competition.

== Personal life ==
Rieko Ōmura (大村李枝子, Ōmura Rieko) was born on September 29, 1935, in Sapporo, Hokkaido, Japan. When she was four years old, her family moved in with her grandfather in Tokyo, where she lived until she was in the third year of grade school. Her family then moved back to Sapporo for a short time before being evacuated at the end of World War II. Her father was transferred to Fukushima, where she lived until moving back to Tokyo during her second year of high school. She graduated from the Tokyo Metropolitan High School Nursery School Academy (東京都立高等保母学院, Tōkyō Toritsu Kōtō Hobo Gakuin). (Note: The school name was later changed to Tokyo Metropolitan High School Preschool Academy (東京都立高等保育学院, Tōkyō Toritsu Kōtō Hoiku Gakuin), which closed in 2013. (See "卒業証明書等の発行（東京都高等保育学院及び東京都社会事業学校を卒業された方へ）" [Issuing of Diplomas and Similar Documents (for those who graduated from Tokyo Metropolitan High School Nursery School Academy and Tokyo Metropolitan Social Work School)] (in Japanese). Tokyo Bureau of Social Welfare and Public Health. Archived from the original on April 27, 2016.))

Nakagawa died on October 14, 2024, at the age of 89.

== Professional life ==
While working as a nursery school worker, she wrote No-No Academy (いやいやえん, Iyaiyaen). In 1962, this book won the Minister of Health and Welfare Award (厚生大臣賞, Kōsei Daijin Shō), the Sankei Juvenile Publications Culture Award (産経児童出版文化賞, Sankei Jidō Shuppan Bunkashō), the Noma Juvenile Cultural Arts Recommended Work Prize (野間児童文芸推奨作品賞, Noma Jidō Bungei Suishō Sakuhin Shō) and the NHK Juvenile Literature Honorable Mention (NHK児童文学奨励賞, NHK Jidō Bungaku Shōreishō). Her 1980 book, Rock the Puppy Is Here (子犬のロクがやってきた, Koinu no Roku ga Yattekita) was awarded the Mainichi Publishing Culture Award (毎日出版文化賞, Mainichi Shuppan Bunkashō).

The Society for the Promotion of Japanese Literature awarded the Kikuchi Kan Prize jointly with her younger sister Yuriko Yamawaki for their children's book series Guri and Gura. Nakagawa and Yamawaki have collaborated on many projects since that time, including on additional volumes in the Guri and Gura series, as well as works like Sora Iro no Tane and The Peach-Colored Giraffe (ももいろのきりん, Momo Iro no Kirin).

Nakagawa wrote a number of essays. She also wrote lyrics for multiple songs for the 1988 Studio Ghibli film My Neighbor Totoro, including Sanpo and Maigo. She wrote the lyrics for the song "Yūki" (ゆうき; lit. "Courage") sung by Mana Ashida, which was released as a single with "Fight!!" (ふぁいと!!, Faito!!) in 2014. "Yūki" was the theme song for the 81st NHK All Japan School Singing Competition in the elementary school group.

== Works ==
=== Children's books ===
==== Guri and Gura series ====
This series has been published since 1967 by Fukuinkan Shoten. All of the books are illustrated by Yuriko Yamawaki, though the first book is credited to Yuriko Ōmura (her maiden name). Several of these titles have been released in English, Korean, and other languages.

1. Guri and Gura (1967)
2. Guri and Gura's Surprise Visitor (1967)
3. Guri and Gura's Seaside Adventure (1977, serialized in Kodomo no Tomo)
4. Guri and Gura's Picnic Adventure (1983, serialized in Kodomo no Tomo)
5. Guri and Gura's Magical Friend (1992, serialized in Kodomo no Tomo)
6. Guri and Gura's Playtime Book of Seasons (1997)
7. Guri and Gura's A-I-U-E-O (2002)
8. Guri and Gura's Spring Cleaning (2002)
9. Guri and Gura's Songs of the Seasons (2003)
10. Guri and Gura's Special Gift (2003, serialized in Kodomo no Tomo)
11. Guri and Gura's 1-2-3 (2004)
12. Guri and Gura's Good Luck Charm (2009)

==== Other works ====
- Iyaiyaen (いやいやえん) (1962, ISBN 4834000109, Fukuinkan Shoten, illustrated by Yuriko Ōmura)
- Kaeru no Eruta (かえるのエルタ) (1964, ISBN 4834000303, Fukuinkan Shoten, illustrated by Yuriko Ōmura)
- Sora Iro no Tane (1964, Fukuinkan Shoten, illustrated by Yuriko Ōmura)
- Momo Iro no Kirin (ももいろのきりん) (1965, ISBN 4834000443, Fukuinkan Shoten, illustrated by Sōya Nakagawa)
- Raion Midori no Nichiyoubi (らいおんみどりの日ようび) (1969, ISBN 4834001865, Fukuinkan Shoten, illustrated by Yuriko Yamawaki)
- Hajimete no Yuki (はじめてのゆき) (1970, Fukuinkan Shoten, illustrated by Sōya Nakagawa)
- Obaa-san Guma to (おばあさんぐまと) (1970, Fukuinkan Shoten, illustrated by Sōya Nakagawa)
- Kaburi-chan (ガブリちゃん) (1971, ISBN 4834011461, Fukuinkan Shoten, illustrated by Sōya Nakagawa)
- Kujiragumo (くじらぐも) (1971, ISBN 4186370036, Mitsumura Tosho Shuppan, Japanese language manual for 1st year elementary students)
- Tanta no Tanken (たんたのたんけん) (1971, ISBN 4051046087, Gakken, illustrated by Yuriko Yamawaki)
- Kodanuki 6-piki (こだぬき6ぴき) (1972, ISBN 4001105624, Iwanami Shoten, illustrated by Sōya Nakagawa)
- Kogitsune Konchi to Okaa-san (こぎつねコンチとおかあさん) (1971, Kodansha)
- Tanta no Tantei (たんたのたんてい) (1975, ISBN 405104615X, Gakken, illustrated by Yuriko Yamawaki)
- Ohisama ha Harappa (おひさまはらっぱ) (1977, ISBN 4834005461, Fukuinkan Shoten, illustrated by Yuriko Yamawaki)
- Mori Obake (森おばけ) (1978, ISBN 4834007340, Fukuinkan Shoten, illustrated by Yuriko Yamawaki)
- Koinu no Roku ga Yattekita (子犬のロクがやってきた) (1979, Fukuinkan Shoten, illustrated by Sōya Nakagawa)
- Torata to Maruta (とらたとまるた) (1982, ISBN 4834009025, Fukuinkan Shoten, illustrated by Sōya Nakagawa)
- Wanwan-mura no Ohanashi (わんわん村のおはなし) (1986, ISBN 4834004643, Fukuinkan Shoten, illustrated by Yuriko Yamawaki)
- Mitsuko no Kobuta (三つ子のこぶた) (1986, ISBN 4931129307, Nora Shoten, illustrated by Yuriko Yamawaki)
- Ohayō (おはよう) (1986, ISBN 4906195377, Guranmamasha, illustrated by Yuriko Yamawaki)
- Oyasumi (おやすみ) (1986, ISBN 4906195385, Guranmamasha, illustrated by Yuriko Yamawaki)
- Kenta - Usagi (けんた・うさぎ) (1986, ISBN 4931129315, Nora Shoten, illustrated by Yuriko Yamawaki)
- Nazonazo Ehon (なぞなぞえほん) (1988, ISBN 4834007413, Fukuinkan Shoten, illustrated by Yuriko Yamawaki)
- Ohisama Onegai Chichinpui (おひさまおねがいチチンプイ) (1991, ISBN 4834005089, Fukuinkan Shoten, illustrated by Yuriko Yamawaki)
- Takataka-yama no Taka-chan (たかたか山のたかちゃん) (1992, ISBN 4931129331, Nora Shoten, illustrated by Kakuta Nakagawa)
- Torata to Ōyuki (とらたとおおゆき) (1993, ISBN 4834011909, Fukuinkan Shoten, illustrated by Sōya Nakagawa)
- Takara Sagashi (たからさがし) (1994, ISBN 483401231X, Fukuinkan Shoten, illustrated by Yuriko Ōmura)
- Kuma-san Kuma-san (くまさんくまさん) (1995, ISBN 4834012999, Fukuinkan Shoten, illustrated by Yuriko Yamawaki)
- Torata to Yotto (とらたとヨット) (1995, Fukuinkan Shoten, illustrated by Sōya Nakagawa)
- Hanehane Hane-chan (はねはね はねちゃん) (1998, ISBN 4834015335, Fukuinkan Shoten, illustrated by Yuriko Yamawaki)
- Otegami (おてがみ) (1998, Fukuinkan Shoten, illustrated by Sōya Nakagawa)
- Kobuta Hoikuen (こぶたほいくえん) (2001, ISBN 4834017397, Fukuinkan Shoten, illustrated by Yuriko Yamawaki)
- Kuma no Kokumakichi (くまのこくまきち) (2001, ISBN 489325491X, Child Honsha, illustrated by Kōzō Kakimoto)
- Chiisai Michiko-chan (ちいさいみちこちゃん) (2006, ISBN 4834021629, Fukuinkan Shoten, illustrated by Yuriko Yamawaki, a selection of Kodomo no Tomo)
- Nekotora-kun (ねことらくん) (2006, ISBN 4834022382, Fukuinkan Shoten, illustrated by Yuriko Yamawaki, a best selection of Kodomo no Tomo)
- Neko no Ongaeshi (ねこのおんがえし) (2007, ISBN 493112934X, Nora Shoten, illustrated by Yuriko Yamawaki)
- Itazura Kitsune (いたずらぎつね) (2008, ISBN 4931129358, Nora Shoten, illustrated by Yuriko Yamawaki)

=== Essays ===
- Hon - Kodomo - Ehon (本・子ども・絵本) (1982, ISBN 4479750010, Daiwa Shobō, illustrated by Yuriko Yamawaki)
- Subarashiki Monogatari-tachi - Omoiyari no Aru Ko wo Sodateru Tame ni (素晴らしき動物たち 思いやりのある子を育てるために) (1985, ISBN 4577700298, Froebel-kan, a conversation with Shirō Nakagawa)
- Ehon to Watashi (絵本と私) (1996, ISBN 4834011828, Fukuinkan Shoten)

=== Lyrics ===
- "Itazura Koneko" (いたずらこねこ) (composed by Hiroshi Hara)
- "Ichinensei no Uta" (一年生のうた) (composed by Neko Saito)
- "Kanagawa Kenritsu Hoiku Senmon Kaguin Inka" (香川県立保育専門学院院歌) (composed by Kōsuke Ōide)
- "Castella no Uta" (カステラのうた) (composed by Hisako Furuichi)
- "Kirin no Kirika" (きりんのキリカ) (composed by Yasuko Kurihara)
- "Kujiratori" (composed by Yuji Nomi)
  - "Zō to Raionmaru" (ぞうとらいおんまる) (composed by Rieko Nakamura)
- "Kuma-san no Odekake" (くまさんのおでかけ) (composed by Masamichi Takahashi and Mieko Okumura)
- "Guri to Gura no Uta" (ぐりとぐらのうた) (composed by Kikuko Kobayashi and Hoick)
- "Gokigen Wani-san" (ごきげんわにさん) (composed by Akihiro Komori, arranged by Akiko Yano, sung by Akiko Yano)
- "Komazawa Olympic Kōen" (駒沢オリンピック公園) (composed by Nobuyoshi Koshibe)
- "Te wo Tsunagō" (手をつなごう) (composed by Makoto Moroi and Michio Mado)
- My Neighbor Totoro (soundtrack and image albums):
  - "Sanpo" (さんぽ) (composed and arranged by Joe Hisaishi)
  - "Maigo" (まいご) (composed and arranged by Joe Hisaishi)
  - "Susuwatari" (すすわたり) (composed and arranged by Joe Hisaishi)
  - "Okaa-san" (おかあさん) (composed and arranged by Joe Hisaishi)
  - "Neko Basu" (ねこバス) (composed and arranged by Joe Hisaishi)
  - "Fushigi Shiritori Uta" (ふしぎしりとりうた) (composed and arranged by Joe Hisaishi)
- "Tobidase Tankentai" (とびだせたんけんたい) (composed by Hiroshi Aoshima)
- "Tonton Taisō" (とんとん体操) (with Michio Mado, composed by Joji Yuasa)
- "Haru" (はる) (composed by Neko Saito)
- "Boroichi Kazoeuta" (ぼろ市かぞえうた) (composed by Nobuyoshi Koshibe)
- "Mado" (まど) (composed by Haruna Miyake)
- "Mari-chan no Komoriuta" (まりちゃんのこもりうた) (composed by Masabumi Kikuchi)
- "Yūki" (ゆうき) (composed by Takatsugu Muramatsu)
