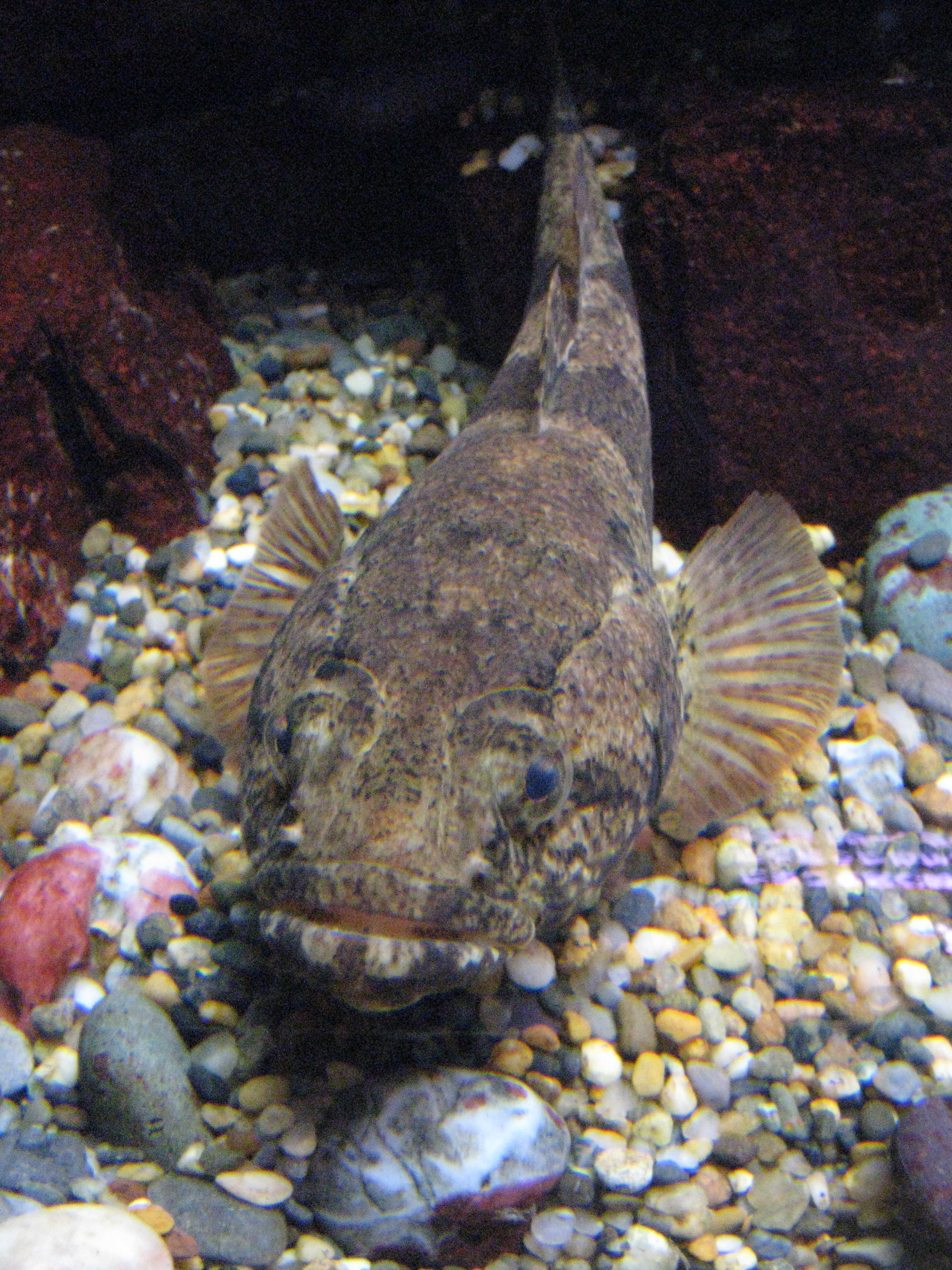
- O. obscura

Scientific classification
- Kingdom: Animalia
- Phylum: Chordata
- Class: Actinopterygii
- Division: Teleostei
- Order: Gobiiformes
- Family: Odontobutidae
- Genus: Odontobutis; Bleeker, 1874

Type species
- Eleotris obscura Temminck & Schlegel, 1845

= Odontobutis =

Odontobutis Temporal range: Middle Miocene to present

Genus of fishes

Odontobutis is a genus of freshwater sleepers native to East Asia and Vietnam. Species in this genus are generally ambush predators with stout bodies, large heads and a wide, rounded pectoral fins. They can be found in small ponds, lakes and river habitats, often in fresh water or brackish water. This genus evolved during the early Miocene epoch during the Neogene period.

== Species ==
The following species are recognized in this genus:

- Odontobutis haifengensis W. Chen, 1985
- Odontobutis hikimius Iwata & H. Sakai, 2002
- Odontobutis interruptus Iwata & S. R. Jeon, 1985
- Odontobutis obscura (Temminck & Schlegel, 1845) (dark sleeper)
- Odontobutis platycephala Iwata & S. R. Jeon, 1985
- Odontobutis potamophila (Günther, 1861)
- Odontobutis sinensis H. L. Wu, I. S. Chen & D. H. Chong, 2002
- Odontobutis yaluensis H. L. Wu, X. Q. Wu & Y. H. Xie, 1993

A single fossil species is known in †Odontobutis hayashitokuei Yabumoto & Zhang, 2023 from the Middle Miocene of Japan.
