= Micropercops =

Scientific classification
- Kingdom: Animalia
- Phylum: Chordata
- Class: Actinopterygii
- Order: Gobiiformes
- Family: Odontobutidae
- Genus: Micropercops; Fowler & B. A. Bean, 1920

Type species
- Micropercops dabryi Fowler & B. A. Bean, 1920

Genus of fishes

Micropercops is a genus of freshwater sleepers native to eastern Asia.

== Species ==
There are currently four recognized species in this genus:

- Micropercops borealis Nichols, 1930
- Micropercops cinctus (Dabry de Thiersant, 1872)
- Micropercops dabryi Fowler & B. A. Bean, 1920
- Micropercops hotayensis Mai, 1978
- Micropercops swinhonis (Günther, 1873)
