= Terateleotris =

Conservation status
- Endangered (IUCN 3.1)

Scientific classification
- Kingdom: Animalia
- Phylum: Chordata
- Class: Actinopterygii
- Division: Teleostei
- Order: Gobiiformes
- Family: Odontobutidae
- Genus: Terateleotris; Shibukawa, Iwata & Viravong, 2001
- Species: T. aspro

Binomial name
- Terateleotris aspro (Kottelat, 1998)

Synonyms
- Odontobutis aspro Kottelat, 1998

Species of fish

Terateleotris is a monospecific genus of freshwater ray-finned fish belonging to the family Odontobutidae, the Asian freshwater sleepers. The only species in the genus is Terateleotris aspro, This taxon is endemic to Laos.

== Taxonomy ==
Terateleotris was first desceribed as a genus in 2001 by Koichi Shibukawa, Akihisa Iwata and Sinthavong Viravong with Odontobutis aspro designated as its type species, as well as being its only species. Odontobutis aspro was first formally described in 1998 by the Swiss ichthyologist Maurice Kottelat with its type locality given as Xe Bangfai, about 3 km (1.9 mi) upriver of Ban Pakphanang, 17°24'20"N, 104°45'50"E, Laos. This taxon is classified in the family Odontobutidae but it is uncertain whether this taxon belongs in that family. The family Odontobutidae is included in the suborder Gobioidei in the order Gobiiformes, which also includes the cardinalfishes and sand-divers.

== Etymology ==
Terateleotris prefixes teras-, meaning "a marvel" or "a monster", onto the genus name Eleotris, the sleeper gobies, an allusion to its sleeper-like appearance, with wat Kottelat described as “remarkable character arrangements” noting that it makes the interrelationships of basal gobioids “chaotic”. The specific name, aspro, is an allusion to the similarity of the colour and pattern of this taxon to Rhyacichthys aspro and to the Rhone streber (Zingel asper, a European percid.

== Description ==
Terateleotris reaches a maximum standard length of 10 cm (3.9 in). It has a total of 9 spines and 9 soft rays in its dorsal fins and its anal fin has a single spine and 11 soft rays.

== Distribution and habitat ==
Terateleotris is endemic to Laos where it is only known from the Xe Bangfai drainage, here it has been recorded within a limited area downstream of the underground course of the river and upstream of the impact zone Nam Theun 2 power plant discharge water releases. It is found in slow current areas with mud, sones and woody debris.
