= Neodontobutis =

Scientific classification
- Kingdom: Animalia
- Phylum: Chordata
- Class: Actinopterygii
- Order: Gobiiformes
- Family: Odontobutidae
- Genus: Neodontobutis; I. S. Chen, Kottelat & H. L. Wu, 2002

Type species
- Hypseleotris hainanensis W. Chen, 1985

Genus of fishes

Neodontobutis is a genus of freshwater sleepers native to eastern Asia.

== Species ==
There are currently five recognized species in this genus:

- Neodontobutis aurarmus (Vidthayanon, 1995)
- Neodontobutis hainanensis (W. Chen, 1985)
- Neodontobutis macropectoralis (Đ. Y. Mai, 1978)
- Neodontobutis ngheanensis X. K. Nguyễn & H. D. Nguyễn, 2011
- Neodontobutis tonkinensis (Đ. Y. Mai, 1978)
