= Sora Iro no Tane =

1964 picture book by Rieko Nakagawa

- Japanese cover of Sora Iro no Tane.
- Author: Rieko Nakagawa
- Original title: そらいろのたね
- Illustrator: Yuriko Ōmura
- Cover artist: Yuriko Ōmura
- Language: Japanese
- Genre: Children's picture book
- Published: 1964 (Fukuin Kanshoten) (Japan)
- Publication place: Japan
- Pages: 28
- ISBN: 4-8340-0084-2

Sora Iro no Tane (そらいろのたね; lit. The Sky-Colored Seed or The Blue Seed) is a 1964 Japanese children's picture book by Rieko Nakagawa and illustrated by Yuriko Ōmura. It was serialized by Fukuin Kanshoten in their Kodomo no Tomo (こどものとも) magazine in 1964, and then published as a book in 1967. Since being published in the magazine, it has been in continuous publication and had sold over a 1.7 million copies in Japan by 2010.

== Plot ==
One day, a young boy named Yuuji was playing with his favorite model airplane when a fox asked him to trade the airplane for the fox's treasured "blue seed". Yuuji planted the seed in his garden and watered it. The next morning, it had grown into a small toy-like blue house. Yuuji chanted, "Grow bigger!" while continuing to take care of it. Before long, it had grown bigger and a small chick started living in it, saying, "This is my house!"

The house continued growing bigger and bigger. A cat and a pig took up residence there as well. Yuuji's friends all came over and had a great time in the house. Soon, all kinds of forest animals and neighborhood kids came to the house as it grew larger and larger. When the house had grown really large, the fox came by and was astonished at how large the house had grown. He told Yuuji he would like to return the model airplane and take back the house. So, all the animals and children in the house left.

The fox entered the house by himself and quickly locked all the doors and windows. Yuuji said, "Oh no! The sun is going to crash into the house!" The sun did just that, causing the house to crumble and disappear. After that, the fox collapsed in a faint where the seed had been planted.

== Publication ==
Sora Iro no Tane was originally published in the children's magazine Kodomo no Tomo (こどものとも) in 1964 by Fukuin Kanshoten. The story was then published in hardcover by Fukuin Kanshoten in 1967, and it has been in continuous publication since then. As of 2010, the book had sold over 1.7 million copies in Japan.

== Reception ==
The Tokyo Children's Library stated that "this picture book will be enjoyed by daydreaming young children."

== Television animation ==
- Sora Iro no Tane

そらいろのたね
- Anime television series
- Directed by: Hayao Miyazaki
- Produced by: Yasuyoshi Tokuma; Yoshio Sasaki
- Music by: Shigeru Nagata
- Studio: Studio Ghibli
- Original network: NTV
- Original run: December 23, 1992
- Episodes: 3

As part of the 40th anniversary of Nippon Television, three 30-second short episodes based on Sora Iro no Tane were created by Studio Ghibli. The episodes were directed by Hayao Miyazaki, with music created by Shigeru Nagata. All three episodes aired on December 23, 1992.

In addition to the television airing, the films were shown in conjunction with screenings of Studio Ghibli's television film Ocean Waves at The Seventh Art Theater in Osaka from October 9–22, 1993, at the Yamagata Forum in Yamagata from November 13–26 that same year, and at the Nakano Musashino Hall in Tokyo from December 25, 1993 to January 14, 1994.

These episodes were collected and released as part of the Everything Ghibli Special: Short Short (ジブリがいっぱいSpecial ショートショート, Jiburi ga Ippai Supesharu Shōto Shōto) DVD in November 2005.

=== Key staff list ===
The filming was done at Studio Cosmos. The following key staff were involved in the production:

- Producers: Yasuyoshi Tokuma, Yoshio Sasaki
- Director: Hayao Miyazaki
- Storyboards, Animation Director: Yoshifumi Kondō
- Music: Shigeru Nagata
- Key Animation: Yoshiharu Satō, Sachiko Sugino
- Color Designer: Michiyo Yasuda
- Director of Photography: Hisao Shirai

=== Anime reception ===
Stig Høgset of THEM Anime Reviews called the animation "smooth" with a "fairly simply [art style]", "like something you'd find in a children's book."
