= Microdous =

Scientific classification
- Kingdom: Animalia
- Phylum: Chordata
- Class: Actinopterygii
- Division: Teleostei
- Order: Gobiiformes
- Family: Odontobutidae
- Genus: Microdous; Li, He, Jiang, Liu & Li, 2018

Type species
- Philypnus chalmersi Nichols & Pope, 1927

Genus of fishes

Microdous is a genus of freshwater ray-finned fish belonging to the family Odontobutidae, the Asian freshwater sleepers. These fishes are found in southeast Asia and southern China.

== Species ==
Microdous contains the following species:

- Microdous amblyrhynchos Hu, Lan & Li, 2023
- Microdous ampliseriatus Endruweit, 2024
- Microdous chalmersi (Nichols & Pope, 1927)
- Microdous hanlani Wang, Wei, He & Li, 2024
- Microdous namxamensis (Chen & Kottelat, 2004)
- Microdous scharpfi Endruweit, 2024
