= Maipotera =

Conservation status
- Data Deficient (IUCN 3.1)

Scientific classification
- Kingdom: Animalia
- Phylum: Chordata
- Class: Actinopterygii
- Division: Teleostei
- Order: Gobiiformes
- Family: Odontobutidae
- Genus: Maipotera; Endruweit, 2024
- Species: M. hotayensis

Binomial name
- Maipotera hotayensis Mai, 1978

Synonyms
- Micropercops hotayensis Mai, 1978

Monospecific gneus of fishes

Maipotera is a monospecific genus of freshwater ray-finned fish belonging to the family Odontobutidae, the Asian freshwater sleeper gobies. The only species in the genus is Maipotera hotayensis which is only known from northern Vietnam.
