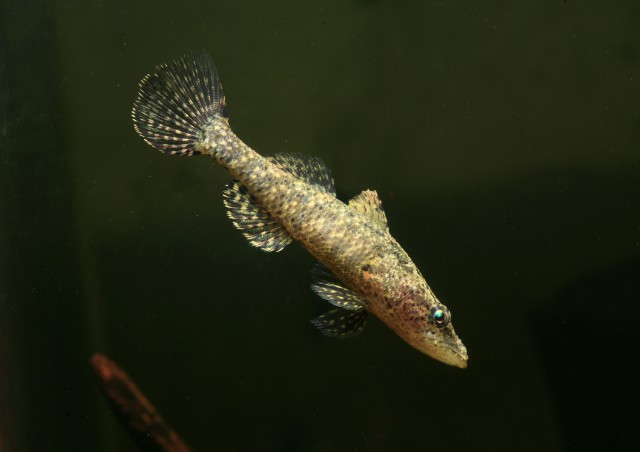

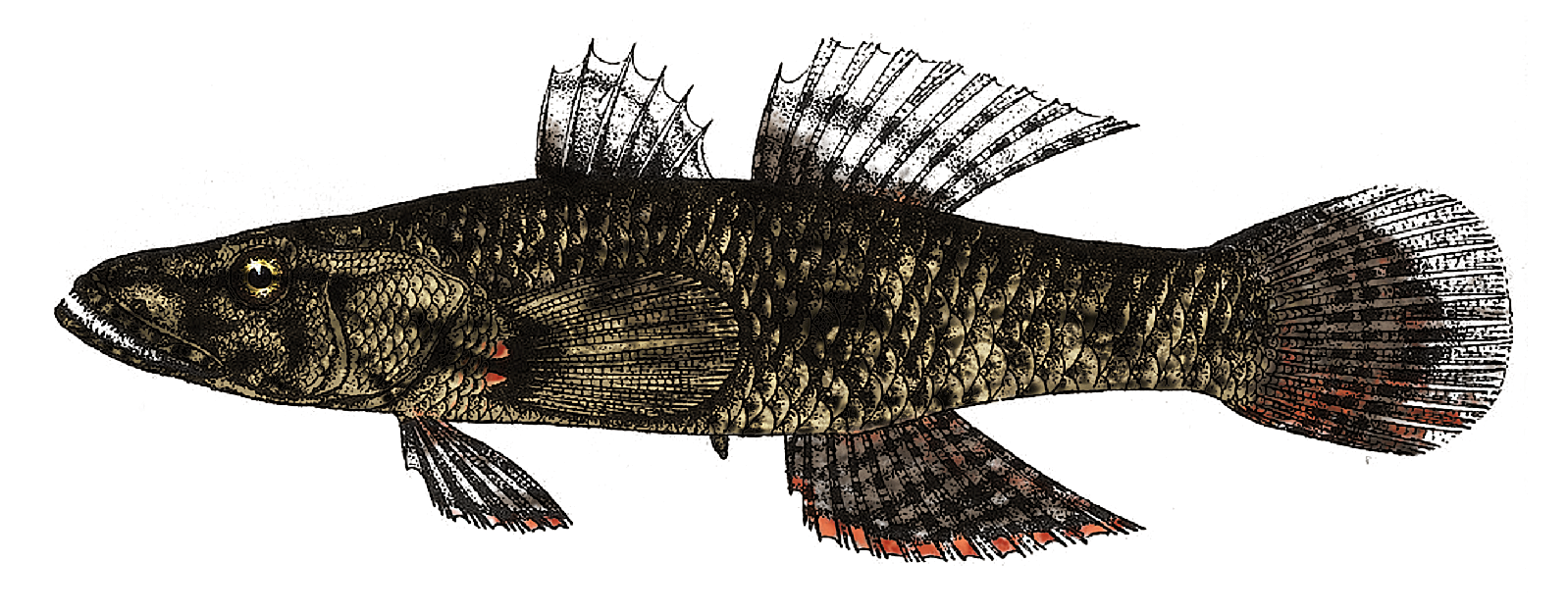

Conservation status
- Least Concern (IUCN 3.1)

Scientific classification
- Kingdom: Animalia
- Phylum: Chordata
- Class: Actinopterygii
- Order: Gobiiformes
- Family: Butidae
- Genus: Butis
- Species: B. butis

Binomial name
- Butis butis (F. Hamilton, 1822)

Synonyms
- Butis prismaticus (F. Hamilton, 1822); Butis leucurus (F. Hamilton, 1822); Cheilodipterus butis F. Hamilton, 1822; Eleotris butis (F. Hamilton, 1822); Eleotris longicauda De Vis, 1910; Eleotris papa De Vis, 1910; Sparus chinensis Osbeck, 1765 (Nomen oblitum)

= Crazy fish =

Crazy fish, Ikan Ubi

Species of fish

Butis butis, the crazy fish, duckbill sleeper, or upside-down sleeper, Ikan Ubi is a species of sleeper goby that are native to brackish and freshwater coastal habitats of the Indian Ocean and the western Pacific Ocean from the African coast to the islands of Fiji. They prefer well-vegetated waters and can frequently be found in mangrove swamps. They are small, drably-colored fish, reaching a maximum length of only 15 cm (5.9 in). They are predatory and are known for their behavior of swimming vertically – or even upside down – while hunting.

== Description ==
Crazy fish range in length from 69 to 155 mm (2.7 to 6.1 in) in length. The head is subcylindrical and flattened dorsoventrally, and slightly concave in the area between the tip of the snout to just behind the eyes. The mouth is very large, with a lower jaw extending past the upper jaw. Both contain multiple rows of tiny, bristle-like, sharp teeth. A pair of nostrils is present on each side of the snout (four in all) midway between the tip of the snout and the eyes. The front pair of nostrils is far smaller in size than the posterior pair. The relatively small eyes (about a sixth of the length of the head in diameter) are situated near the top of the head, but are oriented sidewise. They are gold and black in coloration. The body is strongly compressed laterally.

The dorsal fins are situated approximately in the middle of the body. The first dorsal fin (with five to six rays) is arched and originates from the highest point of the back of the fish. It has thinner rays than the second dorsal fin (with seven to eight rays). The short triangular ventral fins (each with five rays) are located considerably farther forward than all the other fins. The anal fin (with seven to nine rays) is located approximately directly below the second dorsal fin, and are roughly the same size and shape as the latter. The pair of pectoral fins (each with eighteen to twenty rays) are large and rounded. They extend past the anus, sometimes reaching the anal fins. The broad and rounded caudal fin has about twenty closely compacted rays.

The body is covered in scales except the mouth, chin, and the tip of the snout. Small accessory scales of varying sizes are also present at the base of the larger scales on the head and body, numbering at one to six for each larger scale. The scales on the head, nape, and the sides of the body are ctenoid, while the scales on the belly are cycloid.

Crazy fish are drably colored, with the body predominantly mottled dusky gray to olive green. Five or six irregular dark transverse bands are present, obscured somewhat in the front, but distinct in the rear half of the body. A black streak may extend from the snout, across the eye, and towards the gill covers. Dark spots radiate from around the eyes into the gill covers and snout. Each scale along the body has a pale spot that aligns with others, creating noticeable longitudinal rows. One or two red or pinkish spots are also present at the base of the pectoral fins. The fins can be colorless or possess rows of alternating black and light bars. In some individuals, the fins may exhibit broad, bright-red margins. The pectoral fins are invariably colorless.

== Taxonomy and nomenclature ==
Crazy fish are classified under the genus Butis in the family Butidae, which was formerly considered a subfamily, Butinae, of the family Eleotridae (sleeper gobies). They belong to the order Gobiiformes, which to some authorities is a suborder of the order Perciformes called Gobioidei.

The crazy fish was first described by the Scottish naturalist Francis Buchanan-Hamilton in 1822 from a specimen recovered from the Ganges River near Calcutta, India. He originally classified it under the genus Cheilodipterus. It was transferred to the genus Eleotris by the Danish naturalist Theodore Edward Cantor in 1850. In 1856, the Dutch ichthyologist Pieter Bleeker moved it to its own genus, Butis. Hamilton did not explain the origin of the specific name. Hamilton is believed to have derived the name from the Indian word butis, decorative circular designs on sari fabric, probably referring to the coloration of crazy fish.

Other common names of crazy fish include upside-down sleeper, crimson-tipped gudgeon, duckbill sleeper, crocodile fish, flat-headed gudgeon, pointed-head gudgeon, and bony-snouted gudgeon in English; eendbek-slaper in Afrikaans; kuli (কুলি) in Bengali; kuonotorkkuja in Finnish; butis à épaulette noire in French; Spitzkopfgrundel in German; pasel in Ibanag; nyereh, ploso, puntang, belosoh, belontok, ubi, and ubi muncung itik in Indonesian and Malaysian; bloso-watu in Javanese; jǐ táng lǐ (嵴塘鳢) in Mandarin; vaneya in Sinhalese; bukletkhaeng (บู่เกล็ดแข็ง) in Thai; and cá bống cấu, cá bống đầu dẹp, and cá bong trân in Vietnamese.

== Distribution and habitat ==
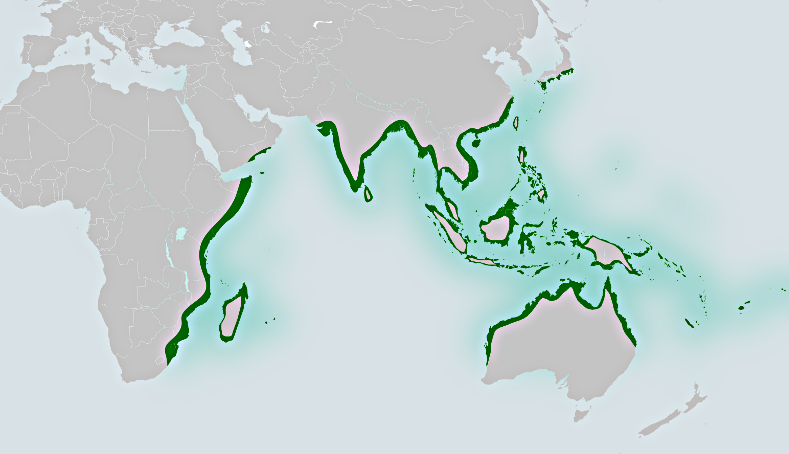
Distribution range

Crazy fish inhabit brackish and freshwater habitats near the coast, but they can sometimes be found upriver. They are demersal fish, usually found near the muddy bottoms of lagoons, estuaries, and mangrove forests with abundant vegetation.

Crazy fish has a wide distribution range: west from East Africa to as far east as Fiji, north from the South China Sea and south to Australia and New Caledonia, including islands in the Indian and Pacific Oceans.

Countries where it is found include Australia (New South Wales, Northern Territory, Queensland, and Western Australia); Brunei Darussalam; Cambodia, China (Guangdong, Guangxi, Hainan, Hong Kong, and Macau); Fiji; India (including the Andaman and Nicobar Islands); Indonesia; Japan; Kenya; Madagascar; Malaysia; Mauritius (including Rodrigues Island); Mozambique; Myanmar; Papua New Guinea; the Philippines; Seychelles; Singapore; Somalia; Sri Lanka; Taiwan; Tanzania; Thailand; and Vietnam.

== Ecology and behavior ==
Crazy fish are predatory, preying on crustaceans, small fishes, and worms. They are territorial and are most active at twilight and at night.

They are known for their behavior of aligning their bodies against the nearest surface, appearing horizontal, vertical, and even upside down. They use this positioning to ambush prey. They also have the ability to change colors to a limited extent to blend in with their environments. During the monsoon seasons, the reddish margins of the fins can turn paler (to either orange or white), accompanied by the appearance of numerous reddish spots on the lower half of the body. The upper half of the caudal fin also turns white.

== Importance ==
Crazy fish are caught and sold for the aquarium trade. They are also edible and are sometimes fished for human consumption. They are reasonably abundant and are classified as Least Concern by the IUCN.

== See also ==
- Goby
