= Noriko Ibaragi =

- 茨木のり子
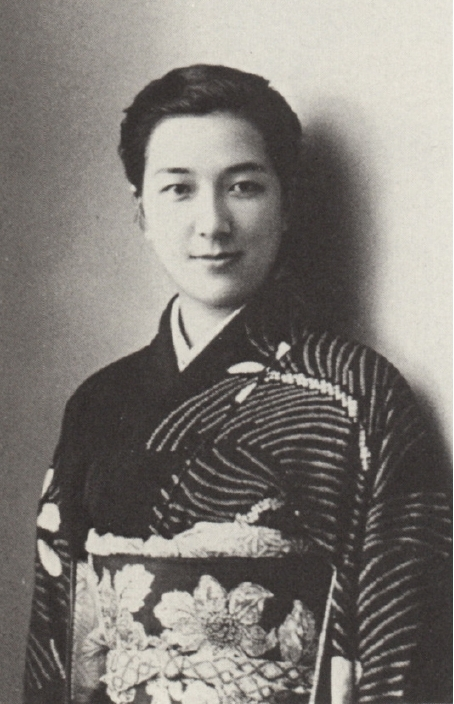
- Born: 宮崎のり子, 三浦のり子 (after marriage); June 12, 1926; Osaka
- Died: February 17, 2006 (age 79)
- Occupations: Poet; writer; playwright; children's literature writer; essayist; translator
- Spouse: Miura Yasunobu
- Writing career
- Language: Japanese, Korean
- Notable work: Watashi ga ichiban kirei datta toki (わたしが一番きれいだったとき)
- Notable awards: Yomiuri Prize

Noriko Ibaragi (茨木 のり子, Ibaragi Noriko) was a Japanese poet, playwright, essayist, children's literature writer, and translator. She is most well known for her poem, Watashi ga ichiban kirei datta toki (わたしが一番きれいだったとき, "When my beauty shone"), written twelve years after the Japanese defeat in WWII. In 1953, she co-founded the literary journal Kai ("Oars"). She began to learn Korean as a second language at the age of fifty, going on to publish her own translations of poetry by her Korean contemporaries.

== Biography ==
=== Early life ===
Noriko Ibaragi was born in Osaka City, Osaka Prefecture and spent her childhood in Nishio City, Aichi Prefecture. In 1943, she entered the Imperial Women's Pharmaceutical College (now Tōhō University) in Tokyo. During her years at the college, she lived through the turmoils of WWII, experiencing air raids and hunger. In 1945, at the age of 19, she heard the broadcast announcing Japanese defeat while working as a mobilized student in a Navy medical supplies factory. Her experiences during the war are recounted in her best-known poem, Watashi ga ichiban kirei datta toki, which expresses her pain at having spent her youth in wartime. The poem was written twelve years later; an English translation was later set to music as "When I Was Most Beautiful" by American folk musician Pete Seeger. She graduated from the college in September 1946.

=== Career ===
After seeing A Midsummer Night's Dream at the Imperial Theatre, Ibaragi decided to become a playwright. In 1946, she was nominated for a Yomiuri Prize (読売新聞戯曲第１回募集) for her first play, Tohotsumioyatachi (とほつみおやたち). In 1948, Ibaragi wrote children's stories Kai no ko puchikyū (貝の子プチキュー) and Gan no kurukoto (雁のくる頃), both broadcast on NHK radio.

In 1950, she married Miura Yasunobu, a physician, and moved to Tokorozawa in Saitama and began submitting her works to the Shigaku (詩学) magazine. Her poetry, Isamashī uta (いさましい歌) was selected for publication on the September volume in 1950.

In 1953, she co-founded the poetry journal Kai (Oars) with Hiroshi Kawasaki, another writer for Shigaku. Although the first volume of Kai only included works by Ibaragi and Kawasaki, they recruited luminaries Shuntarō Tanikawa, Yūjirō Funaoka, Hiroshi Yoshino, and Hiroshi Mizuo as contributors.

In 1976, at the age of fifty, Ibaragi decided to learn Korean as a second language. She corresponded with the Korean poet Hong Yun-suk while learning Korean, writing that she thought the "theft of language" during the Japanese occupation of Korea was a crime, in reference to Hong being educated in Japanese. She was awarded a Yomiuri Prize for her translation of Korean poems in 1990.

Her poetry collection Yorikakarazu (倚りかからず) published in 1999 was featured on the 16 October edition of Asahi Shimbun, and sold a record breaking one hundred and fifty thousand copies.

=== Death ===
Ibaragi died on 17 February 2006 from a brain hemorrhage. As she lived alone, she was discovered in her bed two days later. She had already prepared a will three months earlier; she had also written out a farewell letter and had it printed, ready to send to some two hundred of her friends and correspondents.

== Works ==
=== Poetry collections ===
- Mienai Haitatsufu (見えない配達夫), 1958
- Yorikakarazu (倚りかからず), 1999
