= Fukuinkan Shoten =

Japanese publishing company

- Native name: 株式会社 福音館書店
- Type: Kabushiki kaisha
- Industry: Book publishing
- Founded: February 1, 1952; 74 years ago in Bunkyō, Tokyo, Japan
- Headquarters: Bunkyō, Tokyo, Japan
- Area served: Japan
- Products: Books, magazines
- Website: www.fukuinkan.co.jp

Fukuinkan Shoten (福音館書店) is a Japanese publishing company headquartered in Bunkyō, Tokyo, Japan. It was founded 1916 by Canadian Methodist missionaries. The "Fukuin" in the name is the Japanese word for "gospel" (福音).

They have published multiple best-selling series, including Guri and Gura and Iyaiyaen by Rieko Nakagawa and the Kiki's Delivery Service series by Eiko Kadono. They are also the Japanese publishers for the Peter Rabbit series by Beatrix Potter, The Adventures of Tintin by Hergé, various books featuring the character Miffy, and the My Father's Dragon series by Ruth Stiles Gannett, among others.
