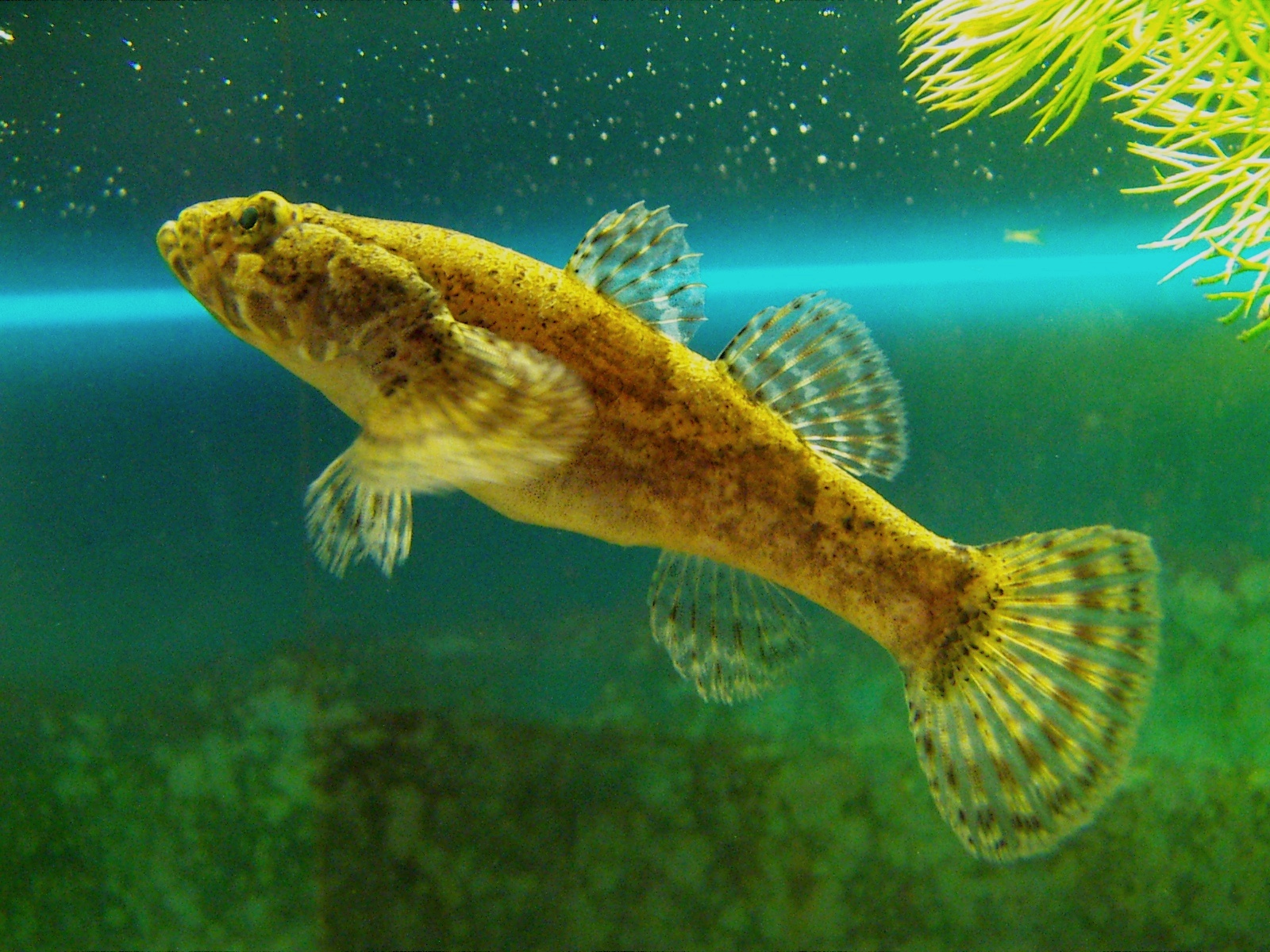

Conservation status
- Least Concern (IUCN 3.1)

Scientific classification
- Kingdom: Animalia
- Phylum: Chordata
- Class: Actinopterygii
- Division: Teleostei
- Order: Gobiiformes
- Family: Odontobutidae
- Genus: Odontobutis
- Species: O. obscurus

Binomial name
- Odontobutis obscurus (Temminck & Schlegel, 1845)

Synonyms
- Eleotris obscura Temminck & Schlegel, 1845; Mogurnda obscura (Temminck & Schlegel, 1845)

= Dark sleeper =

Species of fish

The dark sleeper (Odontobutis obscurus), is a species of freshwater ray-finned fish belonging to the family Odontobutidae, the Asian freshwater sleepers. This fish is found in Eastern Asia. It is a commercially important species.

== Taxonomy ==
The dark sleeper was first formally described as Eleotris obscura in 1845 by the naturalists Coenraad Jacob Temminck and Hermann Schlegel with its type locality given as the rivers entering Nagasaki Bay, Japan. This species is classified in the genus Odontobutis which was described in 1874 by Pieter Bleeker with Eloetris obscura designated as the type species, as well as being the type by monotypy. Within this genus this species forms a clade with O. hikimius and this clade is sister to the remaining r=taxa in the genus. The genus Odontobutis is the type genus of the family Odontobutidae which is included in the suborder Gobioidei in the order Gobiiformes, which also includes the cardinalfishes and sand-divers.

== Etymology ==
The dark sleeper is the type species of the genus Odontobutis, this name combines donto, a Neo-Latin combining form of odoús, meaning "tooth", Bleeker did not explain what this alluded to, it may refer to the outer row of teeth, which are slightly enlarged compared to Butis, both genera were thought to be in the same family at the time this genus was named. The specific name , obscurus, means "dark" in Latin, an allusion to its "dirty brown" coloration which was described as being "irregularly clouded with blackish brown".

== Description ==
The dark sleeper has its first dorsal fin supported by 7 spines, with 1 spine and 9 or 10 soft rays in the second dorsal fin and 1 spine and 9 soft rays in the anal fin. It has short pelvic fins which do not reach the anaus. The head and body are dark brown with the underside being yellowish. There are three clear dark bands on the body. The lower flanks are irregularly mottled with dark blotches. There are dark stripes on the head, a dark spot on the gill cover and pale spots on the head. The fins are barred with rows of black blotches. This species has a fusiform body and it reaches a maximum total length of 17.5 cm (6.9 in).

== Distribution and habitat ==
The dark sleeper has a wide distribution throughout freshwater drainages in Japan and in eastern China, in South Korea it has been recorded from the Sanyang Stream on Geoje Island off the southwestern tip of the Korean Peninsula. In Japan it is distributed throughout freshwater drainages west of the Fossa Magna on the islands of Honshu and Kyushu. In China, it is found in the Yangtze River basin. This species shows a preference for slow moving water in the middle and lower reaches of rivers, typically over sandy and silty substrates, in conditions characterized by high water temperatures and low dissolved oxygen, although it is intolerant to high salinity.

== Behaviour ==
The dark skleeper breeds between April and June in Kyushu, a small number of large eggs are deposited into nests and under large rocks. The males show paternal care, tending the eggs until they hatch after approximately a month.

=== Diet ===
The dark sleeper diet mainly consists of zoobenthos: chironomids, small aquatic bugs and larvae, which are all found in the benthic zone of the water column. In experiments, they will also predate on Japanese eels, with most afflicted eels even attempting to escape out of the digestive system into the oesophagus and gills. Some eels succeeded in exiting through the gills. Eels that were completely inside the stomach constantly circled in it, as if searching for an exit.

== Utilisation ==
The dark sleeper is used in aquaculture in China but there is little information on its yield or harvest.

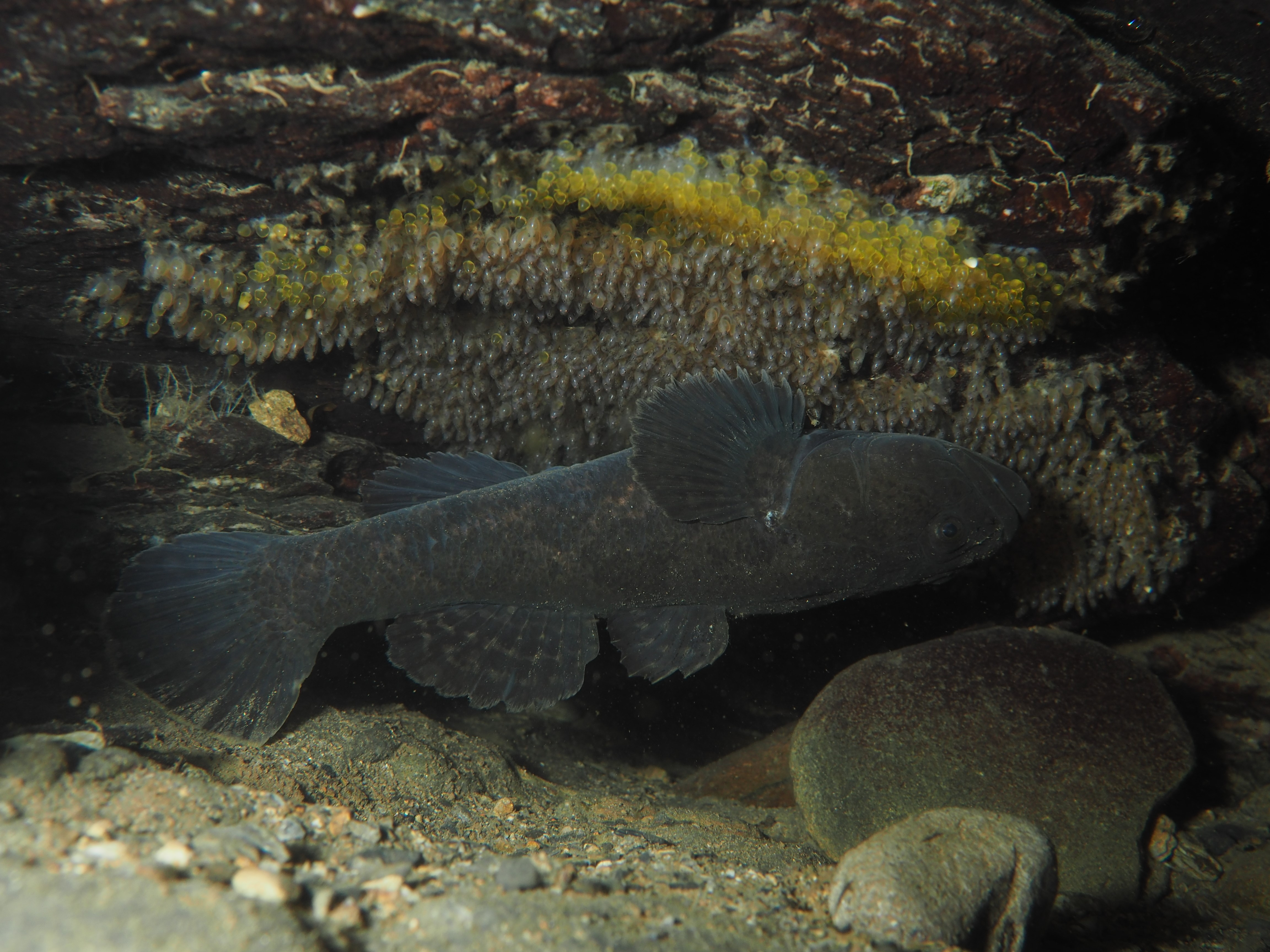
Male guarding eggs, at Kyūshū

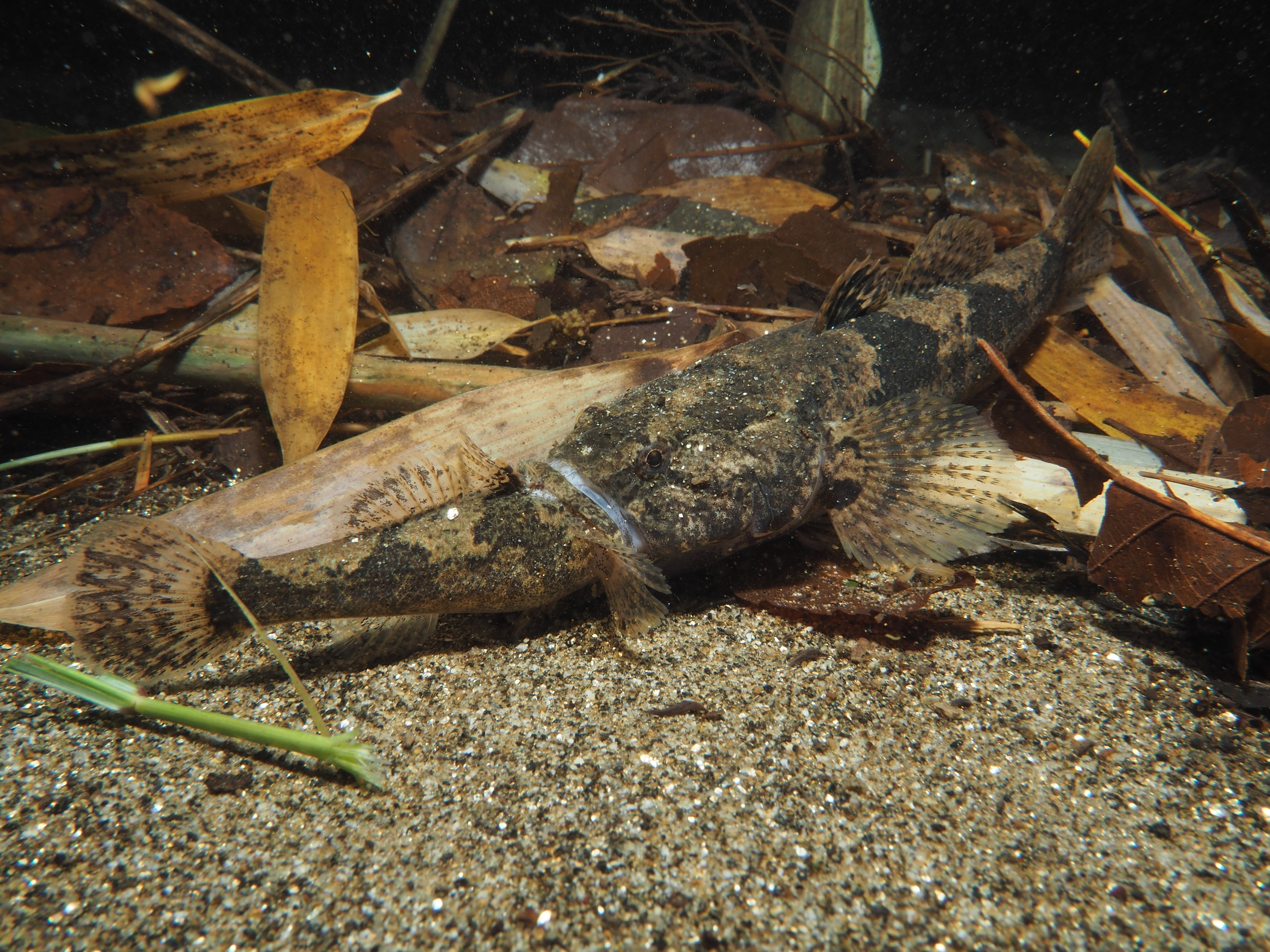
Cannibalism
