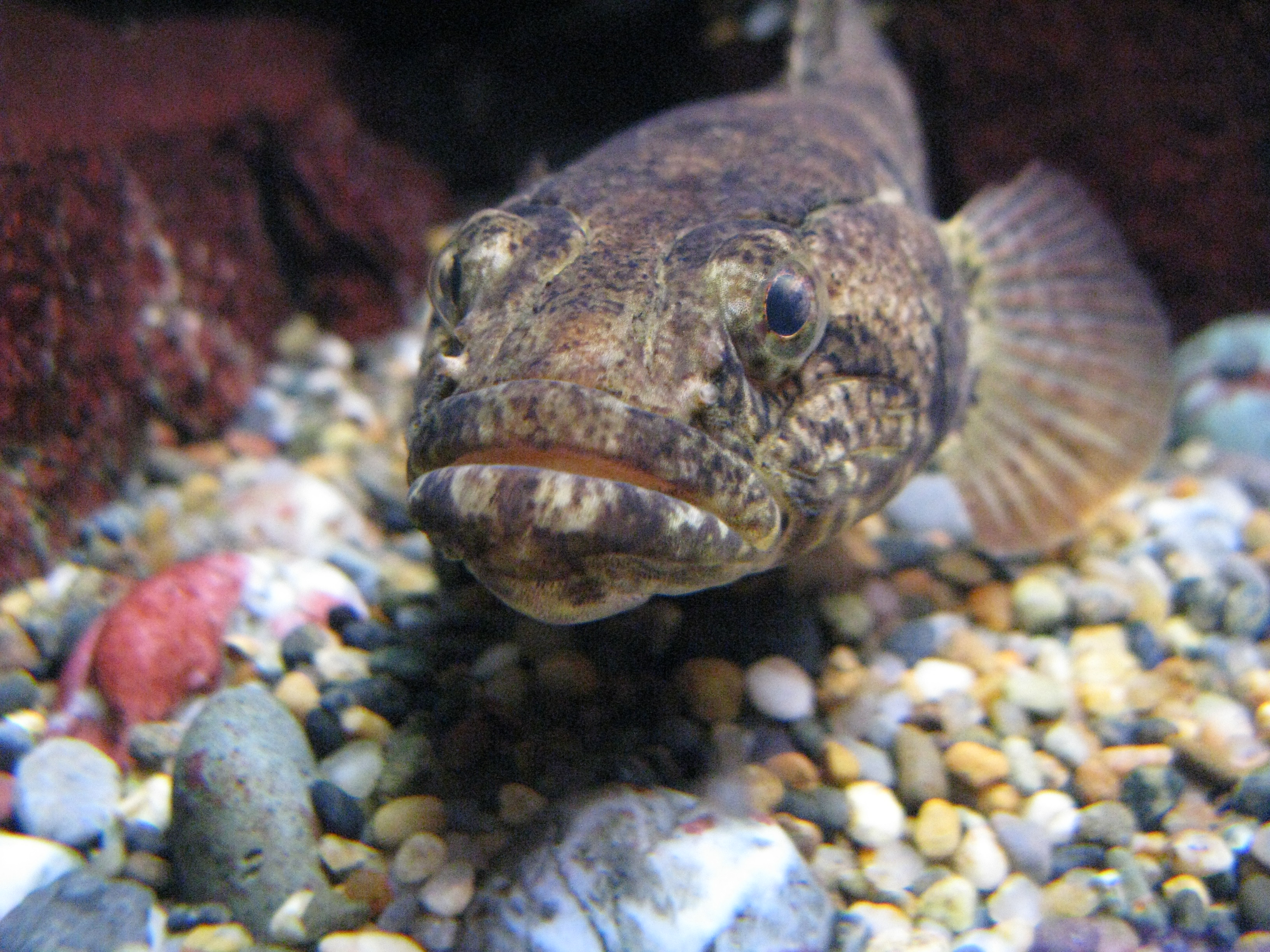
- Odontobutis obscura

Scientific classification
- Kingdom: Animalia
- Phylum: Chordata
- Class: Actinopterygii
- Division: Teleostei
- Order: Gobiiformes
- Suborder: Gobioidei
- Family: Odontobutidae; Hoese & A. C. Gill, 1993

Genera
- See text

= Freshwater sleeper =

Freshwater sleeper Temporal range: Late Eocene to present

Family of ray-finned fishes

Freshwater sleepers are a small family, the Odontobutidae, of gobiiform ray-finned fishes native to freshwater rivers flowing into the South China Sea and the northwestern Pacific Ocean. The family consists of about 22 species in six genera.

== Genera ==
The following genera are currently recognised as being within the family Odontobutidae:

- Maipotera Endruweit, 2024
- Microdous Li, He, Jiang, Liu & Li 2018
- Micropercops Fowler & Bean, 1920
- Neodontobutis I. S. Chen, Kottelat & H. L. Wu, 2002
- Odontobutis Bleeker, 1874
- Perccottus Dybowski, 1877
- Sineleotris Herre, 1940
- Terateleotris Shibukawa, Iwata & Viravong, 2001

A single fossil genus is known, †Paralates Sauvage, 1883, from the Late Eocene of England and Early Oligocene of France. This genus was long considered an early gobioid of uncertain affinities, but a 2025 study, which also analyzed its otolith morphology, found it to be a stem-member of the Odontobutidae.
