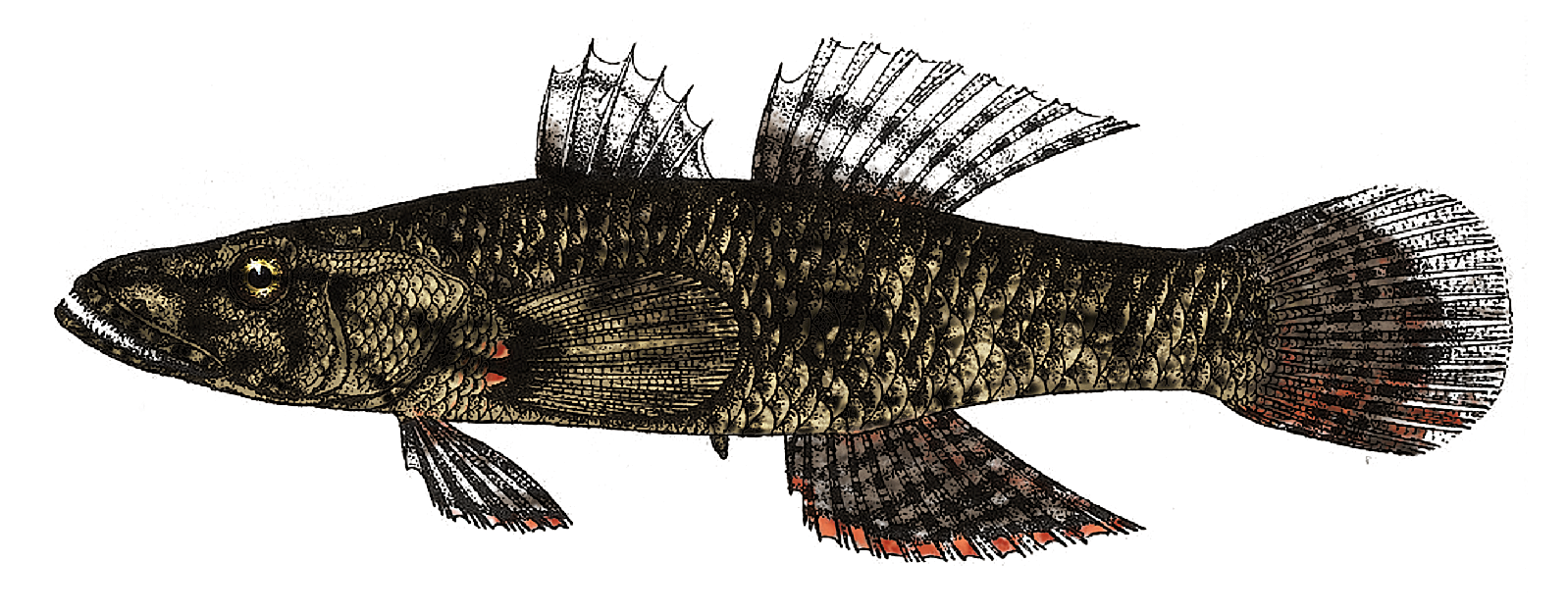
- B. butis
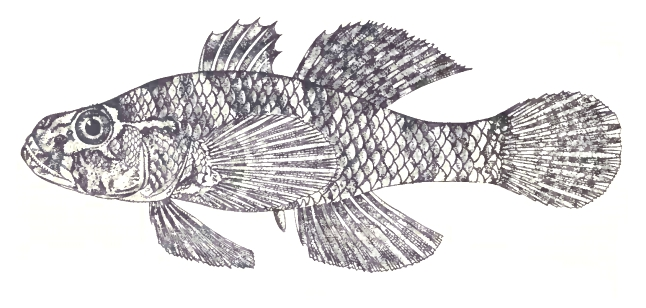
- B. koilomatodon

Scientific classification
- Kingdom: Animalia
- Phylum: Chordata
- Class: Actinopterygii
- Order: Gobiiformes
- Family: Butidae
- Genus: Butis; Bleeker, 1856

Type species
- Cheilodipterus butis F. Hamilton, 1822

= Butis =

Genus of fishes

Butis is a genus of fishes in the family Butidae found in fresh, brackish, and marine waters from the Indian Ocean coast of Africa through Southeast Asia to the Pacific islands and Australia.

== Species ==
The recognized species in this genus are:

- Butis amboinensis (Bleeker, 1853)
- Butis butis (F. Hamilton, 1822) (crazy fish, duckbill sleeper)
- Butis gymnopomus (Bleeker, 1853)
- Butis humeralis (Valenciennes, 1837) (olive flathead-gudgeon)
- Butis koilomatodon (Bleeker, 1849) (mud sleeper)
- Butis melanostigma (Bleeker, 1849) (black-spotted gudgeon)
