= Kimberleyeleotris =

Scientific classification
- Kingdom: Animalia
- Phylum: Chordata
- Class: Actinopterygii
- Order: Gobiiformes
- Family: Eleotridae
- Genus: Kimberleyeleotris; Hoese & G. R. Allen, 1987

Type species
- Kimberleyeleotris hutchinsi Hoese & G. R. Allen, 1987

Genus of fishes

Kimberleyeleotris was a genus of fishes in the family Eleotridae endemic to Australia, where they were only known from rivers in the Kimberley region of Western Australia, in 2023 the genus was synonymized with Hypseleotris and is no longer considered a valid name.

== Species ==
Kimberleyeleotris contained two recognized species.

- Hypseleotris hutchinsi Hoese & G. R. Allen, 1987 (Mitchell gudgeon)
- Hypseleotris notata Hoese & G. R. Allen, 1987 (Drysdale gudgeon)
