= Sayonara (fish) =

Scientific classification
- Kingdom: Animalia
- Phylum: Chordata
- Class: Actinopterygii
- Division: Teleostei
- Order: Perciformes
- Family: Anthiadidae
- Genus: Sayonara; D. S. Jordan & Seale, 1906

Type species
- Sayonara satsumae Jordan & Seale, 1906

Synonyms
- Isobuna Jordan in Jordan & Herre, 1907; Paracirrhites Steindachner in Steindachner & Döderlein, 1883

Genus of ray-finned fishes

Sayonara is a genus of ray-finned fish in the family Anthiadidae found in the Western Pacific Ocean. These deep-water benthic perchlets are found at depths between 200–400 metres (700–1,300 ft).

== Species ==
There are currently 8 recognized species in this genus:

- Sayonara elongata (K. Y. Wu, J. E. Randall & J. P. Chen, 2011)
- Sayonara fijiensis (U. Raj & Seeto, 1983)
- Sayonara flavolineata Tang, Vo & Gill, 2025
- Sayonara japonica (Steindachner, 1883) (Japanese perchlet)
- Sayonara lasti (J. E. Randall & Hoese, 1995) (Trawl perchlet)
- Sayonara megalophthalma (Fourmanoir & J. E. Randall, 1979) (Citron perchlet)
- Sayonara robertsi (J. E. Randall & Hoese, 1995) (Filamentous perchlet)
- Sayonara xanthomaculata (K. Y. Wu, J. E. Randall & J. P. Chen, 2011)
