= Puntang =

Puntang can refer to one of the following:

- Long-finned goby, a fish
- Mount Puntang, a mountain south of Bandung, Indonesia
