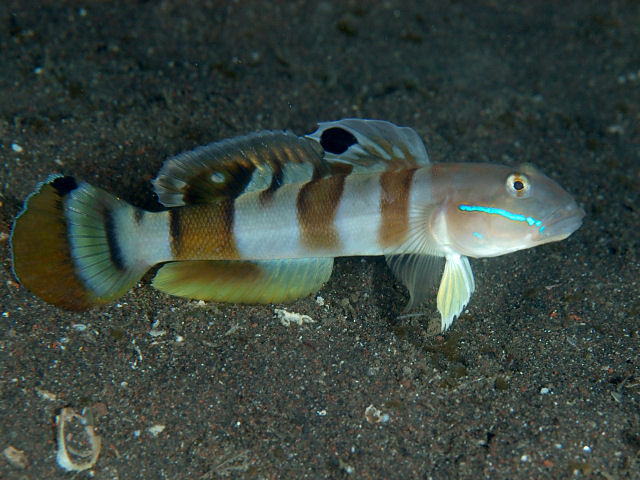
- Valenciennea wardii
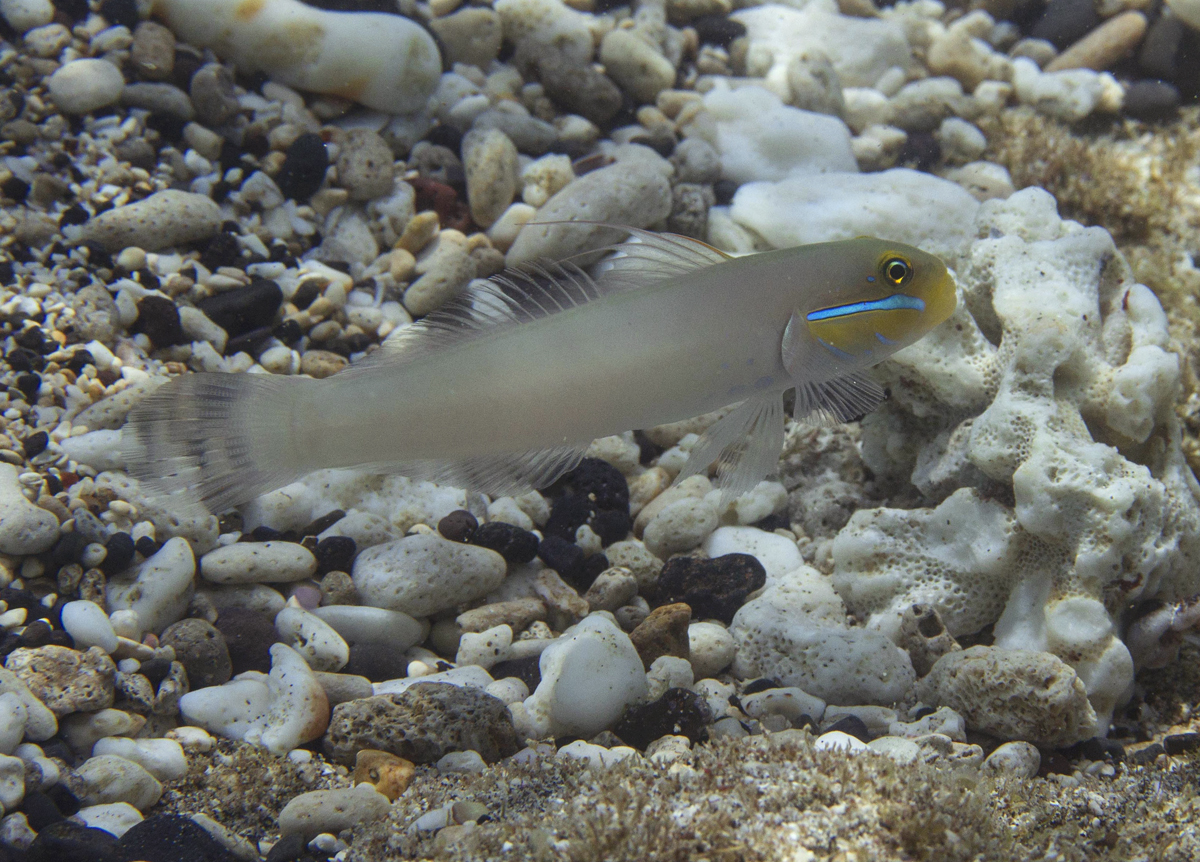
- Valenciennea strigata

Scientific classification
- Kingdom: Animalia
- Phylum: Chordata
- Class: Actinopterygii
- Order: Gobiiformes
- Family: Gobiidae
- Genus: Valenciennea; Bleeker, 1856

Type species
- Eleotris strigata Valenciennes, 1837

Synonyms
- Calleleotris Gill, 1863; Eleotriodes Bleeker, 1857; Gergobius Whitley, 1930; Salarigobius Pfeffer, 1893; Valenciennesia Bleeker, 1874

= Valenciennea =

Genus of fishes

Valenciennea is a genus of small, bottom-dwelling fish in the family Gobiidae. They are found over sandy bottoms, often at coral reefs in the Indo-Pacific. The members of the genus tend to rest directly on the substrate for extended periods of time. While this is a common behavior for members of the family, this genus also float motionless directly above the substrate, which is why they are sometimes called glider gobies. Their resting behavior has resulted in the vernacular name "sleeper gobies", which invites confusion with the related family Eleotridae. The members of this genus are known to be carnivorous sand-sifters; to eat, they simply engulf entire mouthfuls of sand which they expel through their gills. Specialized structures in their gills filter small crustaceans and worms as the sand is expelled. It is this specific trait that makes some members of the genus attractive to the marine aquarist, and they are often introduced into a marine aquarium for sand-sifting. Some of the species are known to be monogamous. The genus was named after notable French zoologist Achille Valenciennes. These fish are difficult to keep in a tank. Tanks with plenty of live sand and live rock are recommended. Offer foods such as sinking shrimp pellets. Fish may die even if eating properly.

== Species ==
There are currently 16 recognized species in this genus:

Image	Scientific name	Common name	Distribution
	Valenciennea alleni Hoese & Larson, 1994	Allen's glidergoby	from northern Australia, from Shark Bay, Western Australia to Decapolis Reef, Queensland.
	Valenciennea bella Hoese & Larson, 1994	Bella goby	Okinawa, Japan and the Philippines.
	Valenciennea decora Hoese & Larson, 1994	Decorated glidergoby	Australia, New Caledonia, and Fiji.
	Valenciennea helsdingenii (Bleeker, 1858)	Two-stripe goby	the coast of East Africa, the southern Red Sea, the Maldives, southeast India and Sri Lanka, Southeast Asia, Australia, western Oceania, and Japan.
	Valenciennea immaculata (Y. Ni, 1981)	Red-lined sleepergoby	Taiwan, Macao, Hong Kong, Philippines, and from Western Australia to Sydney, New South Wales (Australia).
	Valenciennea limicola Hoese & Larson, 1994	Mud goby	known only from Thailand and Fiji. Recorded from Bali, Indonesia
	Valenciennea longipinnis (Lay & E. T. Bennett, 1839)	Long-finned goby	the Indian Ocean and the western Pacific Ocean
	Valenciennea muralis (Valenciennes, 1837)	Mural goby	widely distributed in the eastern Indian Ocean and western tropical Pacific.
	Valenciennea parva Hoese & Larson, 1994	Parva goby	Ashmore Reef, Maldives, and Seychelles to Oceania, north to Ryukyu Islands, south to the Great Barrier Reef.
	Valenciennea persica Hoese & Larson, 1994		Persian Gulf to Masirah Island, central Oman.
	Valenciennea puellaris (Tomiyama, 1956)	Maiden goby	the Indian Ocean and the western Pacific Ocean.
	Valenciennea randalli Hoese & Larson, 1994	Green-band goby	Ryukyu Islands, Philippines, Solomon Islands, Malaysia, Palau, Indonesia and the Great Barrier Reef.
	Valenciennea sexguttata (Valenciennes, 1837)	Six-spot goby	the Indian Ocean and the western Pacific Ocean.
	Valenciennea strigata (Broussonet, 1782)	Blue-band goby	the Indian Ocean and the western Pacific Ocean
	Valenciennea wardii (Playfair (fr), 1867)	Ward's sleepergoby	the Indian Ocean and the western Pacific Ocean
	Valenciennea yanoi T. Suzuki, Senou & J. E. Randall, 2016		Japan
