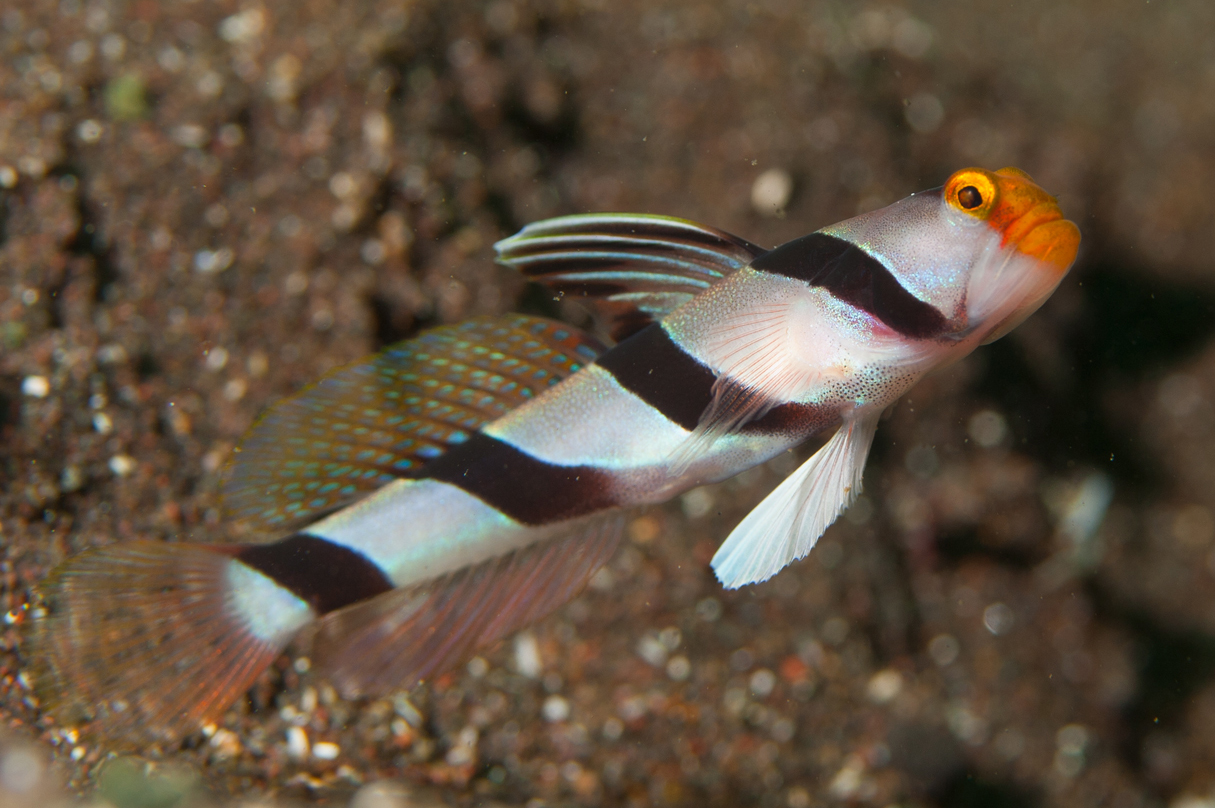
- Stonogobiops xanthorhinica

Scientific classification
- Domain: Eukaryota
- Kingdom: Animalia
- Phylum: Chordata
- Class: Actinopterygii
- Order: Gobiiformes
- Family: Gobiidae
- Genus: Stonogobiops; Polunin & Lubbock, 1977

Type species
- Stonogobiops dracula Polunin & Lubbock, 1977

= Stonogobiops =

Genus of fishes

Stonogobiops is a genus of gobies native to the Indian and Pacific oceans. This is one of the "shrimp goby" genera, the members of these genera being commensal with various species of shrimps.

== Species ==
There are currently seven recognized species in this genus:

- Stonogobiops dracula Polunin & Lubbock, 1977 (Dracula shrimp-goby)
- Stonogobiops larsonae (G. R. Allen, 1999) (Larson's shrimpgoby)
- Stonogobiops medon Hoese & J. E. Randall, 1982
- Stonogobiops nematodes Hoese & J. E. Randall, 1982 (Filament-finned prawn-goby)
- Stonogobiops pentafasciata Iwata & Hirata, 1994
- Stonogobiops xanthorhinica Hoese & J. E. Randall, 1982 (Yellownose prawn-goby)
- Stonogobiops yasha Yoshino & Shimada, 2001 (Orange-striped shrimpgoby)
