= Pascua =

Scientific classification
- Kingdom: Animalia
- Phylum: Chordata
- Class: Actinopterygii
- Order: Gobiiformes
- Family: Gobiidae
- Genus: Pascua; J. E. Randall, 2005

Type species
- Pascua caudilinea J. E. Randall, 2005

Genus of fishes

Pascua is a genus of gobies native to the Pacific Ocean. The origin of the name "Pascua" is from the Spanish for "Easter" in recognition of the Easter Island range of the type specimen.

== Species ==
There are currently two recognized species in this genus:

- Pascua caudilinea J. E. Randall, 2005 (Pascua goby)
- Pascua sticta (Hoese & Larson, 2005)

A third species in this genus Pascua readeri (Hoese & Larson, 2005) has been recognised by some authorities, but is placed in Hetereleotris by FishBase.
