= Carnival of Tarazona de la Mancha =

Carnival is the most important and well-known festivity celebrated in Tarazona de la Mancha, in the Spanish province of Albacete. In 2013, the carnival was designated a festival of Regional Tourist Interest by the Government of Castilla-La Mancha, and in 2023 it was declared a bien de Interés Cultural in the category of intangible heritage.

== History ==
The carnival tradition in Tarazona de la Mancha dates back to the late Middle Ages and has been passed down through generations.

- As early as 1899, the "Ordinance for Good Municipal Government" addressed many Carnival-related issues. Article 14, for instance, states that "during Carnival, it shall, under the appropriate circumstances, be permitted to wear a costume, an eye mask or a mask, but covering one's face during prayer time is forbidden." Furthermore, according to Article 16, "no masked person shall be insulted, nor have their mask removed, as only the authorities and their representatives have the right to do so." The earliest documented municipal reference to the carnival dates to 1894, when the town council recorded a payment to musicians for performing during the celebrations.
- In 1947, the then-mayor Edelmiro Sanchiz, the Guardia Civil (the Spanish military police) and the Local Police persecuted people in disguise because it was illegal at the time.
- Back in 1950, mayor José Muñoz Núñez (Pepito Núñez), read the prohibition order from the Town Hall balcony, and then encouraged people to celebrate Carnival by putting on a costume himself. The masks and costumes were hidden in people's homes to avoid being caught by the police, and the townspeople collaborated to outwit the authorities.
- At the 1954 carnival ball, the mayor Don Pascasio Quílez danced with every single masked person in the ball to stop the military police from closing the event.
- People in disguise had to take off their disguise and mask on entering the ball or public places so that the security guards could identify them.
- For many years, the local council has been supporting Carnival events such as balls and processions.

== Characteristics ==
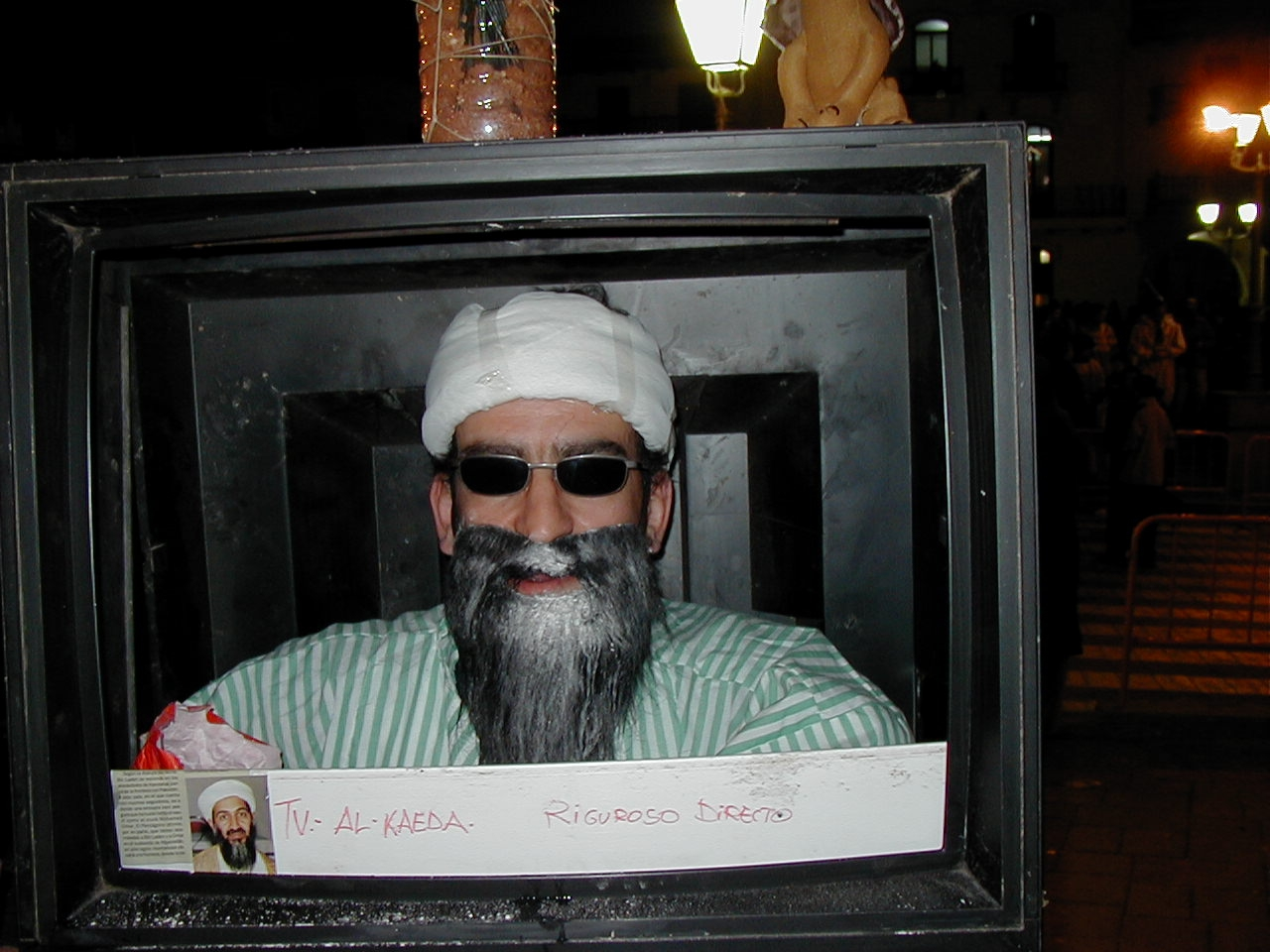
Followed from everywhere

The Carnival of Tarazona is special because it has some essential features which distinguish it from Carnival celebrations in other towns:

- A lot of people, of all ages, participate in the Carnival of Tarazona; virtually everyone takes part in some way or another.
- The Carnival participants walk around the streets and finally arrive at the Plaza Mayor (the main square).
- Some people take part in a theatre performance, showing their costumes to visitors, so tourists can have a good time and feel welcome.
- The traditional disguise (mascaruta) consists of wearing a shoebox on one's head, with a bedsheet draped over it and a cloth mask covering the person's face. They get on people’s nerves with a mosquero, a fly swatter made from a stick with coloured cardboard stuck to it on one end. They also carry a plastic bottle of water mixed with cologne, talcum powder or a brush, and when someone looks at them, they say: "You’re dumb. You don’t even know who I am."
- The parade was traditionally celebrated on Shrove Monday, which was called Día de Los Espantajos (the day of frights).

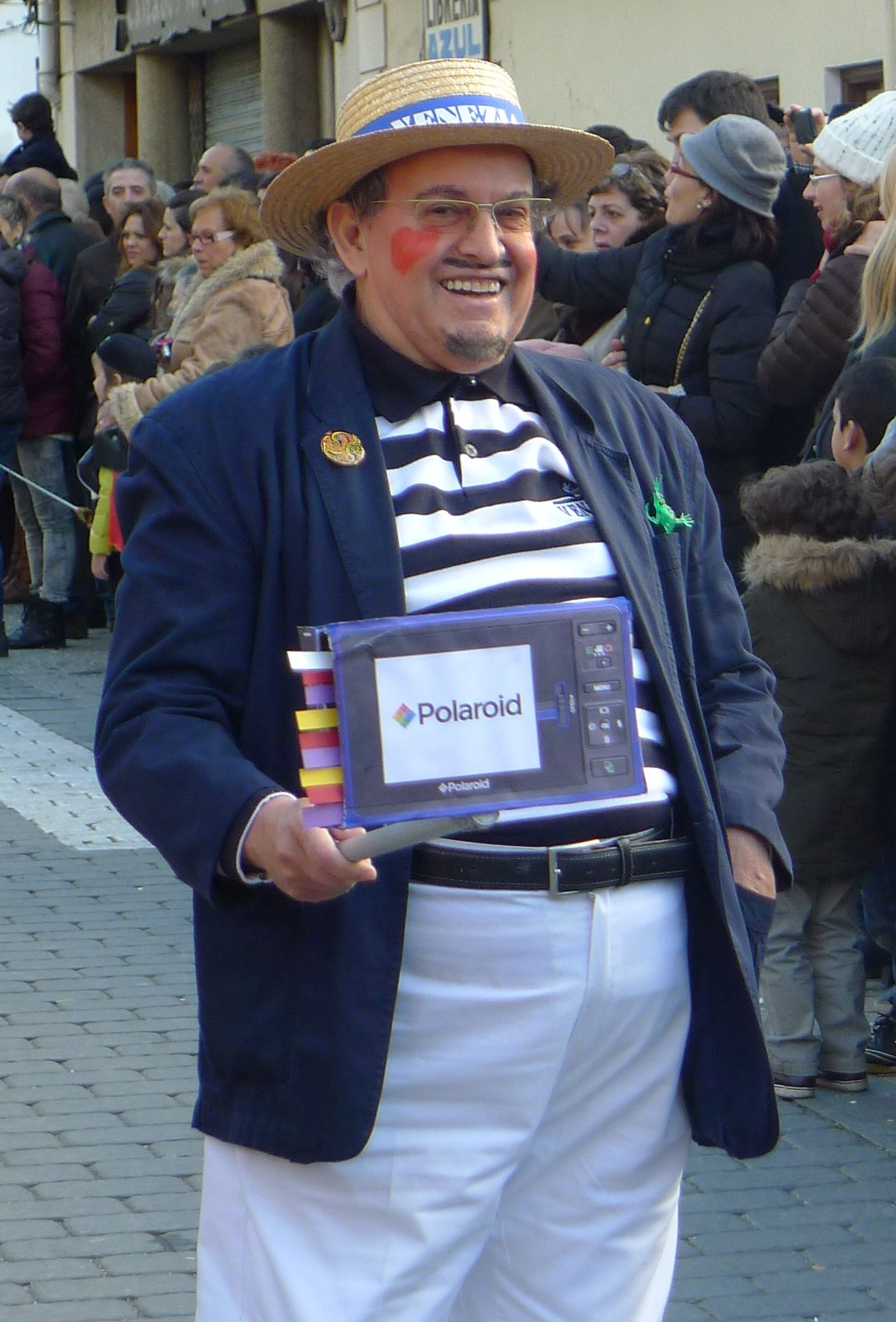
Selfies

== Duration of the festivities ==
Since 1985, the official duration of the festivity is six days.

- At the beginning of the 20th century, the carnival festivities lasted three days (Sunday, Monday and Tuesday). The last day was the most important one. The Shrove Tuesday celebrations of Tarazona were famous throughout the region and attracted visitors from outside Tarazona.
- Around 1960, the carnival festivities lasted only two days (Monday and Tuesday); the three-day festivities were reinstated in 1966.
- In 1970, the preceding Saturday was added, so the carnival lasted four days.
- In 1972, a second Sunday was added, the so-called Domingo de Piñata (Sunday of the Piñata).
- Finally, in 1978 a second Saturday, the so-called Sábado de Piñata (Saturday of the Piñata), was added, bringing the number of days up to the current six.
- Since 1989, neither the Entierro de la Sardina ("Sardine burial", the official Carnival closing ceremony) is not celebrated, neither is Ash Wednesday, although it was very famous in the past.
- The Provincial Contest of Carnival Posters is organized by the Stet School Eduardo Sanchiz, it has been celebrated since 1988. It was the first in the region with this feature and the announcement of the winning poster is the prelude of the Carnival every year. .

The date of Carnival depends on the date of Easter; in accordance with the computus, the calculation used to determine the calendar date of Easter, the carnival dates for the next years are as follows:

Year	Beginning of Carnival (Saturday)	End of Carnival(Sunday)
2013	9 February 2013	17 February 2013
2014	1 March 2014	9 March 2014
2015	14 February 2015	22 February 2015
2016	6 February 2016	14 February 2016
2017	25 February 2017	5 March 2017
2018	10 February 2018	18 February 2018
2019	2 March 2019	10 March 2019
2020	22 February 2020	1 March 2020

== The opening speech ==
For several years, the opening speech is made on the first Saturday of the event. The first opening speech was given by the Carnival troupe El Trago, the oldest one taking part in the Carnival of Tarazona. Each year a different troupe is in charge of the opening speech, which is given from the balconies of the Town Hall and watched by the crowds in the Plaza Mayor, the central square of Tarazona.

The opening speech has taken place on the first Saturday afternoon for several years. A lot of troupes have participated, among them Los Basureros, Los Cabecitas, El Automóvil, Los Iguanas, Los Vagos, Los Impresentables (2011), Los Trucaos (2012), La Cuadrilla (2013), Los ansiaos (2014) and Peña Airbag (2015).

== Processions ==
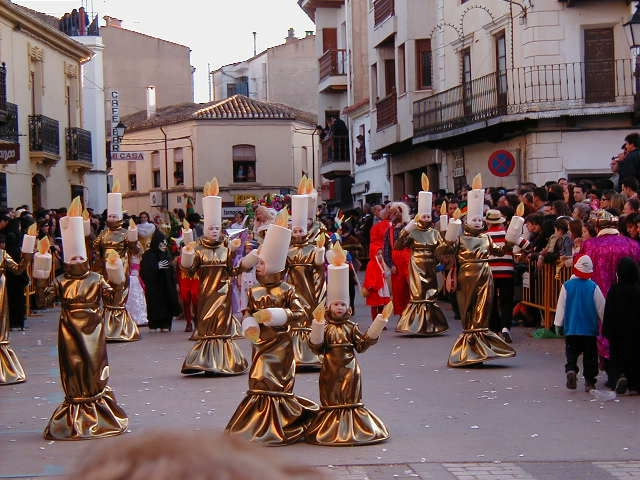
A Carnival procession

There have always been processions, which traditionally pass through all parts of the town and end up in the central square.

In the past, these street processions were not organized, and musicians, bands, and other people wearing costumes or masks could participate freely in them. They paraded every afternoon, on every day of the Carnival celebrations, encouraging the townspeople to dress up and join the party.

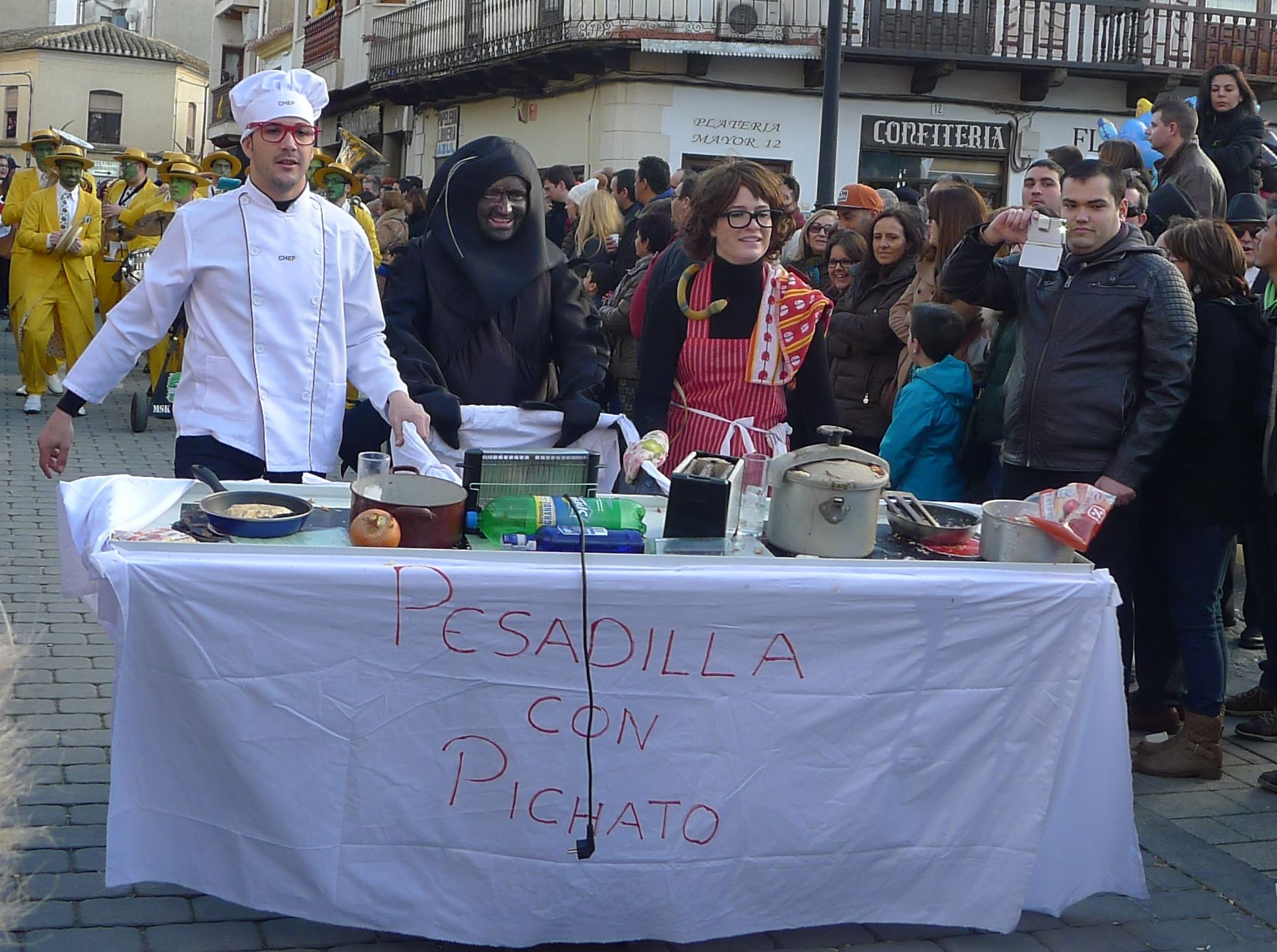
Masterchefs

Since 1981, due to the boom that the Carnival of Tarazona has been experiencing year after year, the Sunday parades have a fixed route, from the Alto de la Virgen to Plaza Mayor. They are still not organized, and it is the troupes who decide to meet at a certain point and march towards the town square. People visiting the Carnival can thus enjoy performances along a predetermined route. There are also processions on Shrove Tuesday.

The organized processions began in 1983; nowadays they take place on the two Sundays of the Carnival celebrations.

Since 1988, the children’s procession has taken place on Shrove Monday; it is promoted and organized by the Eduardo Sanchiz School and goes from the school to Plaza Mayor.

Several groups of women joined the troupes that take part in the Carnival processions. Due to the promotion and participation of these women, the Women's Carnival Day has been celebrated on Shrove Tuesday since 2002.
