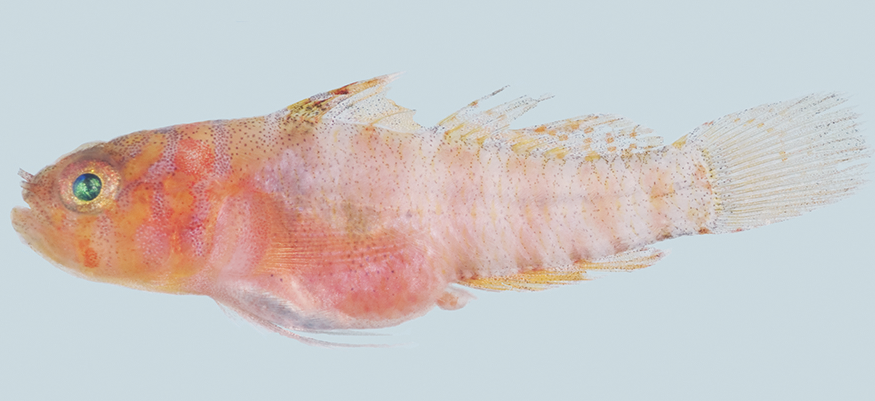

Scientific classification
- Kingdom: Animalia
- Phylum: Chordata
- Class: Actinopterygii
- Order: Gobiiformes
- Family: Gobiidae
- Genus: Sueviota
- Species: S. aprica

Binomial name
- Sueviota aprica R. Winterbottom & Hoese, 1988

= Sueviota aprica =

Species of fish

Sueviota aprica, the sunny dwarfgoby, is a species of fish in the family Gobiidae. found in Indonesia.This species reaches a length of 1.4 cm (0.55 in).
