= Navigobius =

Scientific classification
- Kingdom: Animalia
- Phylum: Chordata
- Class: Actinopterygii
- Order: Gobiiformes
- Family: Gobiidae
- Genus: Navigobius; Hoese & Motomura, 2009

Type species
- Navigobius dewa Hoese & Motomura

Genus of fishes

Navigobius is a genus of fish in the family Microdesmidae native to the Indo-Pacific Ocean.

== Species ==
There are currently 3 recognized species in this genus:

- Navigobius dewa Hoese & Motomura, 2009
- Navigobius khanhoa Prokofiev, 2016
- Navigobius vittatus G. R. Allen, Erdmann & Cahyani, 2015 (Brunei dartfish)
