= Sueviota bryozophila =

Scientific classification
- Kingdom: Animalia
- Phylum: Chordata
- Class: Actinopterygii
- Division: Teleostei
- Order: Gobiiformes
- Family: Gobiidae
- Genus: Sueviota
- Species: S. bryozophila

Binomial name
- Sueviota bryozophila G. R. Allen, Erdmann & Cahyani, 2016

Species of fish

Sueviota bryozophila the bryozoan goby, is a species of fish in the family Gobiidae. It is found in Indonesia.

== Description ==
Sueviota bryozophila reaches a standard length of 1.3 cm (0.51 in).
