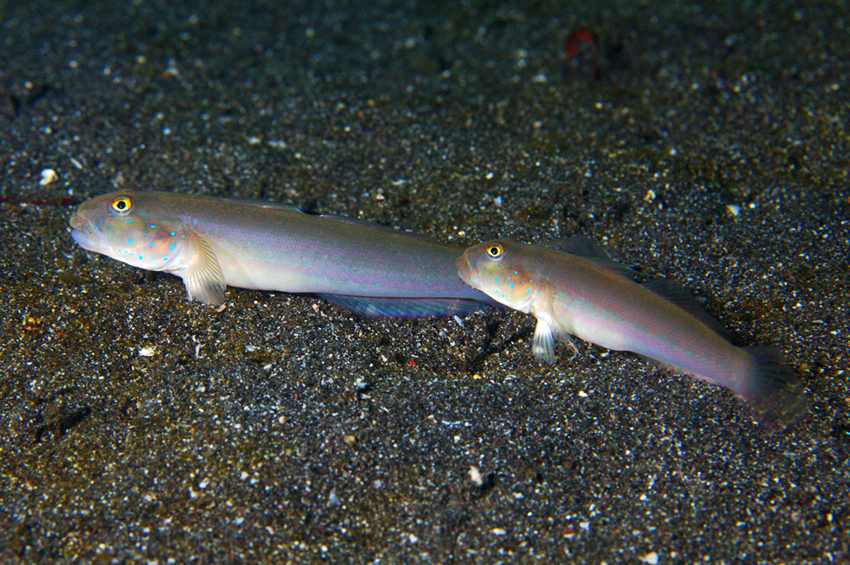

Scientific classification
- Kingdom: Animalia
- Phylum: Chordata
- Class: Actinopterygii
- Order: Gobiiformes
- Family: Gobiidae
- Genus: Valenciennea
- Species: V. sexguttata

Binomial name
- Valenciennea sexguttata (Valenciennes, 1837)

Synonyms
- Eleotris sexguttata Valenciennes, 1837; Eleotriodes sexguttatus (Valenciennes, 1837); Eleotris lantzii Thominot, 1878; Salarigobius stuhlmannii Pfeffer, 1893; Valenciennea violifera Jordan & Seale, 1906; Eleotriodes pallidus Klausewitz, 1960

= Valenciennea sexguttata =

Species of fish

Valencienna sexguttata, the chalk goby, sixspot goby or sleeper blue dot goby, is a species of goby native to the Indian Ocean and the western Pacific Ocean. It inhabits bays or lagoons in waters from 3 to 25 m (9.8 to 82.0 ft) with silt or sand substrates with rocks under which to burrow. It can reach 14 cm (5.5 in) in TL, and may be found in the aquarium trade.
