= Discordipinna =

Scientific classification
- Kingdom: Animalia
- Phylum: Chordata
- Class: Actinopterygii
- Order: Gobiiformes
- Family: Gobiidae
- Genus: Discordipinna; Hoese & Fourmanoir, 1978

Type species
- Discordipinna griessingeri Hoese & Fourmanoir, 1978

Genus of fishes

Discordipinna is a genus of gobies native to the Indian Ocean and the western Pacific Ocean.

== Species ==
There are currently two recognized species in this genus:

- Discordipinna filamentosa I. S. Chen, T. Suzuki & K. T. Shao, 2012
- Discordipinna griessingeri Hoese & Fourmanoir, 1978 (Spikefin goby)
