= Sayonara megalophthalma =

Conservation status
- Least Concern (IUCN 3.1)

Scientific classification
- Kingdom: Animalia
- Phylum: Chordata
- Class: Actinopterygii
- Division: Teleostei
- Order: Perciformes
- Family: Anthiadidae
- Genus: Sayonara
- Species: S. megalophthalma

Binomial name
- Sayonara megalophthalma (Fourmanoir & J. E. Randall, 1979)

Synonyms
- Plectranthias megalophthalmus

Species of fish

Sayonara megalophthalma, the citron perchlet, is a species of fish in the family Anthiadidae occurring in the Indo-Pacific.

== Size ==
This species reaches a length of 6.1 cm (2.4 in).
