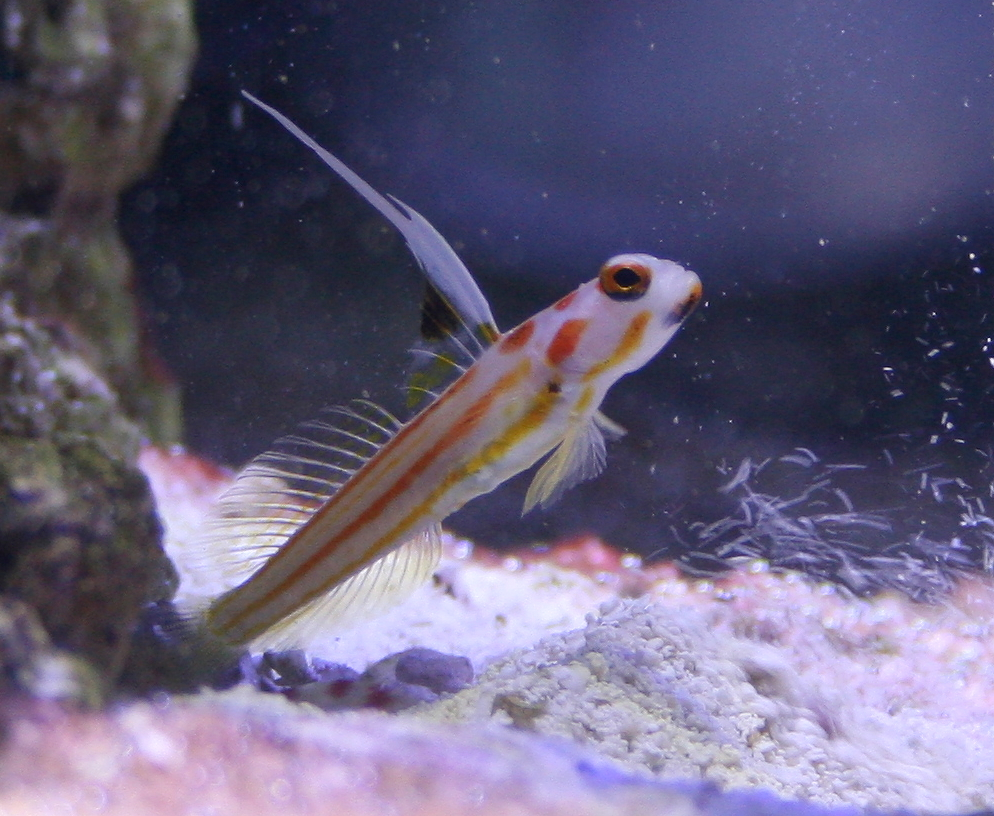

Scientific classification
- Kingdom: Animalia
- Phylum: Chordata
- Class: Actinopterygii
- Order: Gobiiformes
- Family: Gobiidae
- Genus: Stonogobiops
- Species: S. yasha

Binomial name
- Stonogobiops yasha Yoshino & Shimada, 2001

= Stonogobiops yasha =

Species of fish

Stonogobiops yasha, the Orange-striped shrimpgoby, is a species of goby native to the Western Pacific Ocean where it occurs at depths of from 15 to 40 metres (49 to 131 ft). It inhabits sandy areas along the outer slopes of reefs where it lives in a commensal relationship with the shrimp Alpheus randalli. This species can reach a length of 4.7 centimetres (1.9 in) SL.

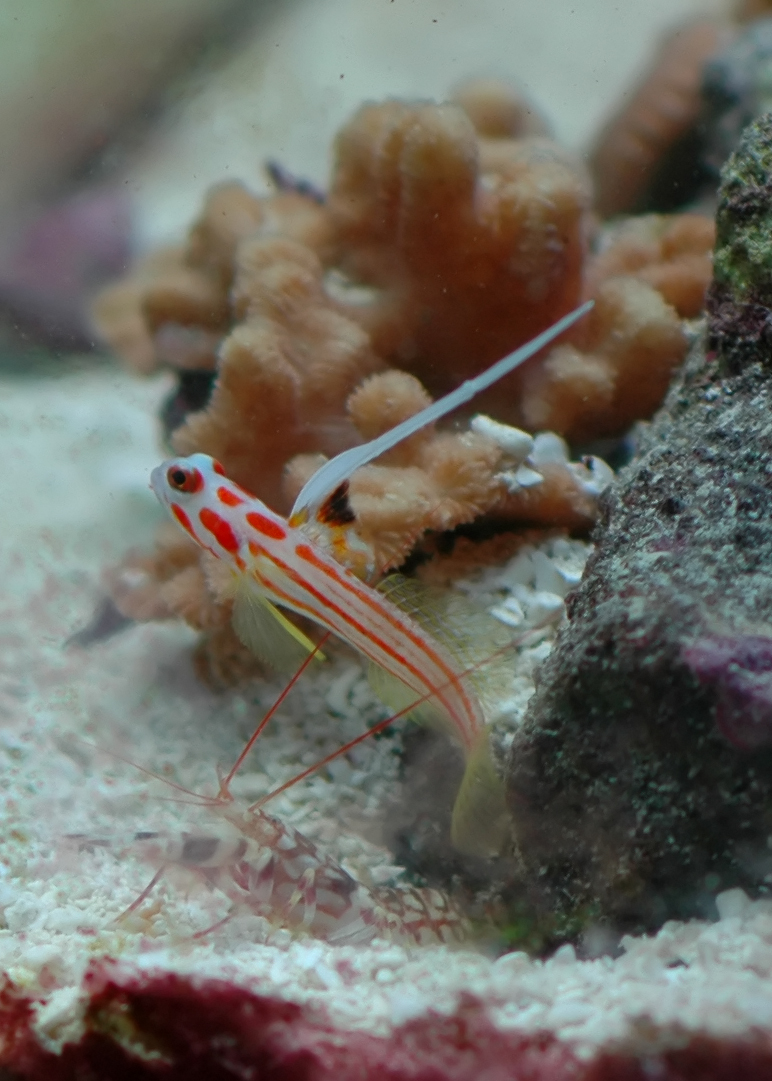
Orange-striped shrimpgoby with Pistol Shrimp
