= Sayonara japonica =

Scientific classification
- Kingdom: Animalia
- Phylum: Chordata
- Class: Actinopterygii
- Division: Teleostei
- Order: Perciformes
- Family: Anthiadidae
- Genus: Sayonara
- Species: S. japonica

Binomial name
- Sayonara japonica (Steindachner, 1883)

Synonyms
- Paracirrhites japonicus Steindachner, 1883; Isobuna japonica (Steindachner, 1883); Plectranthias japonicus (Steindachner, 1883); Sayonara satsumae Jordan & Seale, 1906; Sayonara mitsukurii Smith & Pope, 1906

Species of fish

Sayonara japonica, the Japanese perchlet, is a species of fish in the family Anthiadidae described from Japan. It also occurs in the south-eastern Indian Ocean and the western Pacific Ocean from the Philippines north to Taiwan and Japan, and off of the Northern Territory of Australia.

== Size ==
This species reaches a length of 15.0 cm (5.9 in).

== Etymology ==
The fish is from Japan.
