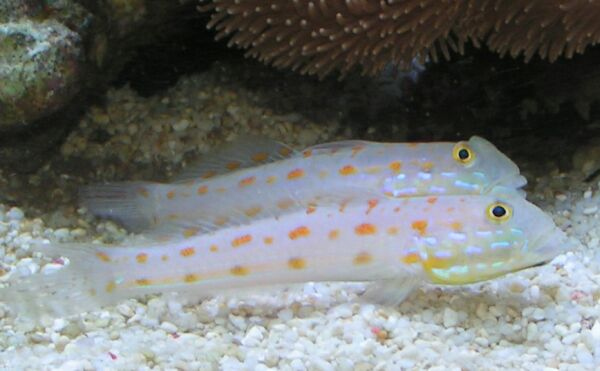

Conservation status
- Least Concern (IUCN 3.1)

Scientific classification
- Kingdom: Animalia
- Phylum: Chordata
- Class: Actinopterygii
- Division: Teleostei
- Order: Gobiiformes
- Family: Gobiidae
- Genus: Valenciennea
- Species: V. puellaris

Binomial name
- Valenciennea puellaris (Tomiyama, 1956)

Synonyms
- Eleotriodes puellaris Tomiyama, 1956

= Valenciennea puellaris =

Species of fish

Valenciennea puellaris, the Orange-spotted sleeper-goby, Orange-dashed goby, Maiden goby, or the Diamond Watchman goby, is a species of goby native to the Indian Ocean and the western Pacific Ocean. It inhabits lagoons and outer reefs where it occurs over sandy substrates with larger pieces of rubble for it to burrow under. V. puellaris can reach a length of 20 centimetres (7.9 in) SL. It is also a prevalent fish in the aquarium hobby. Its diet is composed of zooplankton and dead fish or invertebrates.
