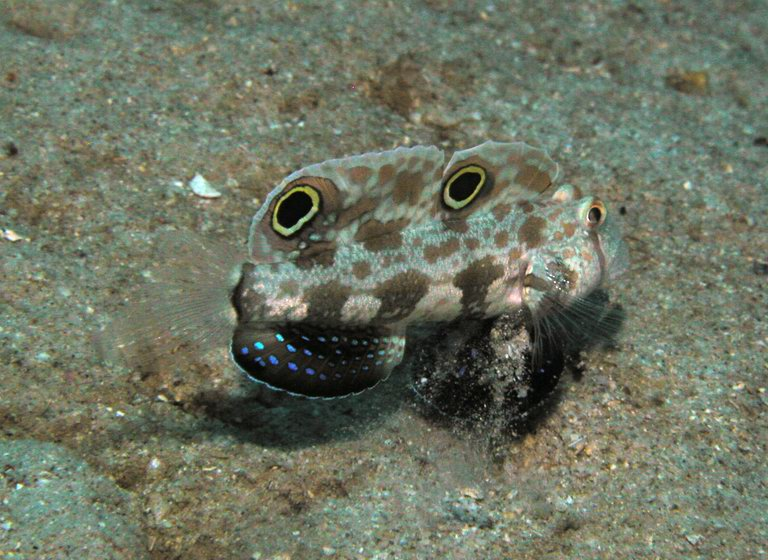

Conservation status
- Least Concern (IUCN 3.1)

Scientific classification
- Kingdom: Animalia
- Phylum: Chordata
- Class: Actinopterygii
- Order: Gobiiformes
- Family: Gobiidae
- Genus: Signigobius
- Species: S. biocellatus

Binomial name
- Signigobius biocellatus Hoese & G. R. Allen, 1977

= Twin-spot goby =

Species of fish

The Twin-spot Goby, or Crab-eyed Goby, (Signigobius biocellatus) is a species of goby native to the Western Pacific Ocean where they can be found in areas of sand, silt in lagoons, or coastal bays with nearby cover such as rubble, coral, or leaf litter. They can be found at depths of from 1 to 30 metres (0 to 100 ft). This species can reach a length of 7.5 centimetres (3.0 in) SL. It can also be found in the aquarium trade. It is currently the only known member of its genus.
