= Sueviota minersorum =

Scientific classification
- Kingdom: Animalia
- Phylum: Chordata
- Class: Actinopterygii
- Order: Gobiiformes
- Family: Gobiidae
- Genus: Sueviota
- Species: S. minersorum

Binomial name
- Sueviota minersorum D. W. Greenfield, Erdmann & Utama, 2019

Species of fish

Sueviota minersorum, commonly known as the Miner's dwarfgoby, is a species of small, cryptic fish in the family Gobiidae. This species was described in 2019 by David W. Greenfield, Mark V. Erdmann, and Ilham Vemandra Utama.

== Size ==
This species reaches a maximum size of up to 2.3 cm (0.91 in) in length for males, and 2.0 cm (0.79 in) for females.

== Distinctive features ==
This species has a bluish-grey body with red-orange markings over the head, pectoral-fin base, and as a bar on each body scale. The fins have iridescent sky-blue margins and round reddish spots along the spines of the second dorsal fin.

== Fin structure ==
Dorsal spines: 7; Dorsal soft rays: 9; Anal spines: 1; Anal soft rays: 8.

== Habitat ==
Distribution: Endemic to the Misool Island in the Raja Ampat Islands, Indonesia.

== Environment ==
Found at depths of 20–22 metres (70–70 ft), often associated with Theonella tube sponges. They are typically observed in current-exposed walls and steep slopes.

== Behavior ==
Social Structure: They benefit from social interactions within their species and are best kept in groups of at least 5 to 6 individuals.

== Feeding ==
They ae omnivorous, feeding on small invertebrates and algae.

== Conservation ==
IUCN Status: Not Evaluated.

CITES: Not listed.

== Etymology ==
The species name "minersorum" is in honor of Andrew and Marit Miners, who founded the Misool EcoResort in Raja Ampat Islands and have been instrumental in conservation and sustainable economic development in the region.
