= Sayonara elongata =

Scientific classification
- Kingdom: Animalia
- Phylum: Chordata
- Class: Actinopterygii
- Division: Teleostei
- Order: Perciformes
- Family: Anthiadidae
- Genus: Sayonara
- Species: S. elongata

Binomial name
- Sayonara elongata (K. Y. Wu, J. E. Randall & J. P. Chen, 2011)

Synonyms
- Plectranthias elongatus

Species of fish

Sayonara elongata is a species of fish in the family Anthiadidae occurring in the Pacific Ocean.

== Size ==
This species reaches a length of 5.4 cm (2.1 in).
