= Ophiogobius jenynsi =

Conservation status
- Least Concern (IUCN 3.1)

Scientific classification
- Kingdom: Animalia
- Phylum: Chordata
- Class: Actinopterygii
- Order: Gobiiformes
- Family: Gobiidae
- Genus: Ophiogobius
- Species: O. jenynsi

Binomial name
- Ophiogobius jenynsi Hoese, 1976

Synonyms
- Gobius ophicephalus Jenyns, 1842; Ophiogobius ophicephalus (Jenyns, 1842)

Species of fish

Ophiogobius jenynsi is a species of ray-finned fish from the biology Gobiidae, the true gobies. It is a demersal, marine species which is found off the coast of Chile in the intertidal zone. It feeds mainly on crustaceans. This species was originally named as Gobius ophicephalus by Leonard Jenyns in 1842, subsequently misspelt as ophiocephalus, but this name was preoccupied by Pallas's 1811 Gobius ophiocephalus, Hoese renamed the species in honour of Jenyns in 1976. This is the only species in its genus.
