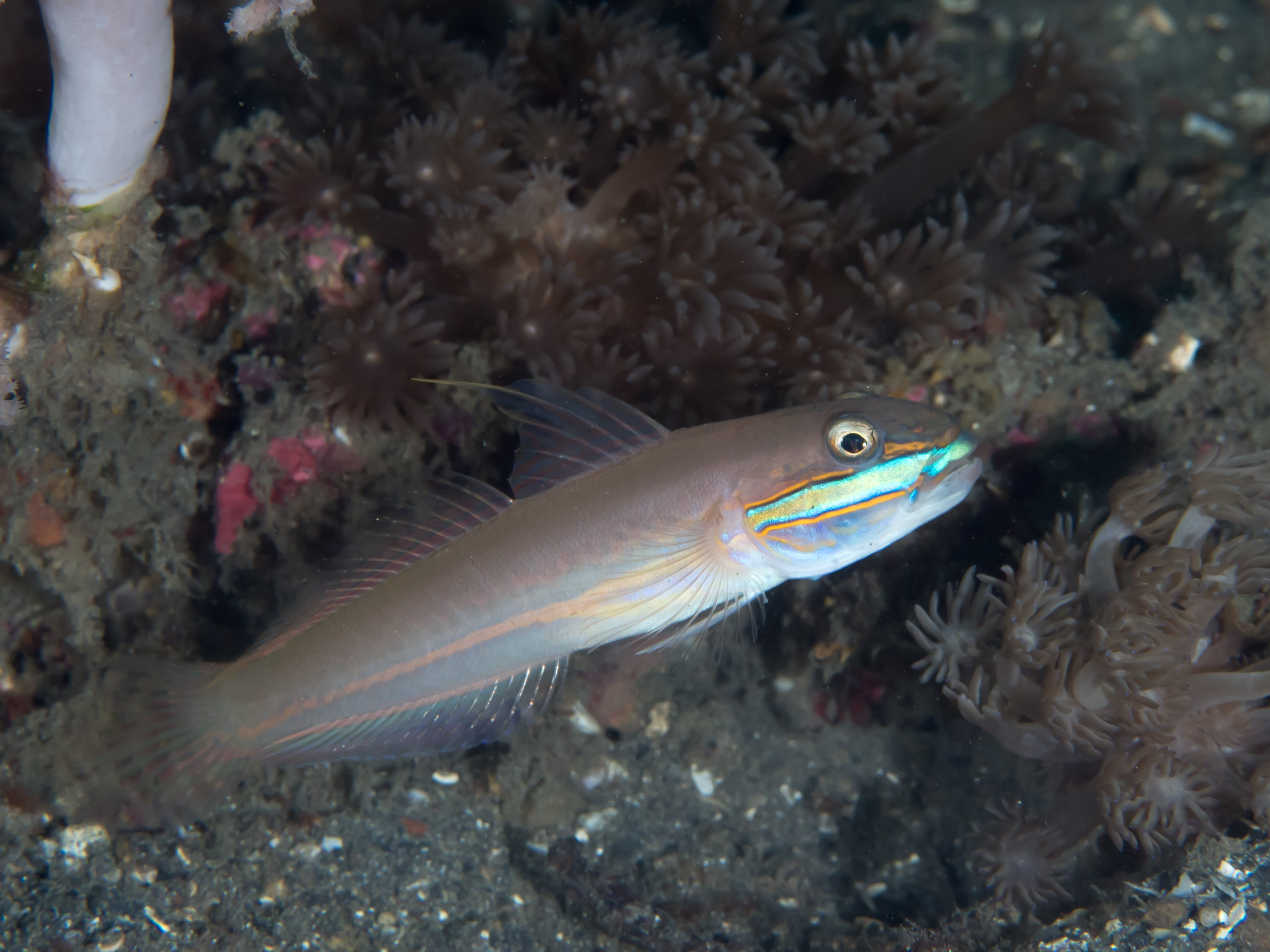

Conservation status
- Least Concern (IUCN 3.1)

Scientific classification
- Kingdom: Animalia
- Phylum: Chordata
- Class: Actinopterygii
- Order: Gobiiformes
- Family: Gobiidae
- Genus: Valenciennea
- Species: V. randalli

Binomial name
- Valenciennea randalli Hoese and Larson, 1994

= Valenciennea randalli =

Species of fish

Valenciennea ranalli, known as the greenband goby and green-band sleeper-goby, is a species of goby native to the western Pacific Ocean and eastern Indian Ocean.

== Taxonomy and etymology ==
Valenciennea randalli was first described by Douglass F. Hoese and Helen K. Larson in 1994. A goby, it is classified in the family Gobiidae of order Gobiiformes. It is also known by the common names greenband goby and green-band sleeper-goby.

The holotype, BPBM I 32000, was collected from Honiara, Solomon Islands, and is housed at the Bernice Pauahi Bishop Museum in Honolulu, Hawaii, US. The generic name, Valenciennea, honors zoologist Achille Valenciennes, while the specific name, randalli, honors ichthyologist John E. Randall. It is one of 16 species in the genus Valenciennea, all of which are found in the Indo-Pacific.

== Distribution and habitat ==
V. randalli is native to the western Pacific Ocean and eastern Indian Ocean, including the Andaman Sea, the Great Barrier Reef, the Ryukyu Islands, the Spratly Islands, the Solomon Islands, the Philippines, Papua New Guinea, Timor-Leste, Taiwan, Fiji, Palau, Vanuatu, New Caledonia, Indonesia, Brunei, Singapore, and Malaysia. It prefers estuaries, reefs, and lagoons with silty or muddy substrates, where it lives in burrows at a depth of 5–55 metres (16–180 ft). It is a marine fish though it is tolerant of brackish water.

== Description ==
V. randalli grows up to 16 centimetres (6.3 in) in standard length. Fusiform in shape, it is grey with a blue-green stripe, red and blue at the margins, under the eye, and with a pale orange stripe along the lower half of its side. The dorsal fin has six to seven spines and 16–18 rays; the anal fin has one spine and 16–18 rays.

== Conservation ==
V. randalli is assessed as a least concern species on the IUCN Red List. No major threats to its population have been identified, and while it is infrequently encountered during surveys, its population is likely larger than this would otherwise indicate due to deep, turbid water in its preferred habitat. The species is used in the aquarium trade.
