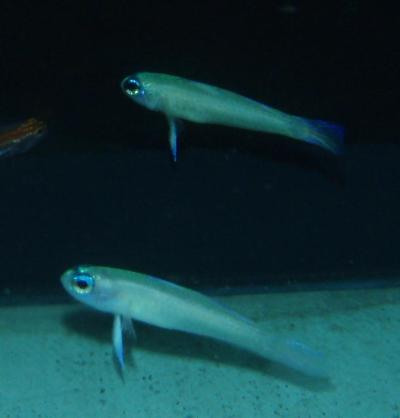
- Tryssogobius colini

Scientific classification
- Kingdom: Animalia
- Phylum: Chordata
- Class: Actinopterygii
- Order: Gobiiformes
- Family: Gobiidae
- Genus: Tryssogobius; Larson & Hoese, 2001

Type species
- Tryssogobius colini Larson & Hoese, 2001

= Tryssogobius =

Genus of fishes

Tryssogobius is a genus of small gobies native to the western Pacific Ocean. The species in this genus are known colloquially as "fairygobies".

== Species ==
There are currently seven recognized species in this genus:

- Tryssogobius colini Larson & Hoese, 2001 (Colin's fairygoby)
- Tryssogobius flavolineatus J. E. Randall, 2006 (Yellow-lined fairygoby)
- Tryssogobius longipes Larson & Hoese, 2001 (Longfin fairygoby)
- Tryssogobius nigrolineatus J. E. Randall, 2006 (Deepreef fairygoby)
- Tryssogobius porosus Larson & I. S. Chen, 2007
- Tryssogobius quinquespinus J. E. Randall, 2006 (Fivespine fairygoby)
- Tryssogobius sarah G. R. Allen & Erdmann, 2012 (Sarah's fairygoby)
