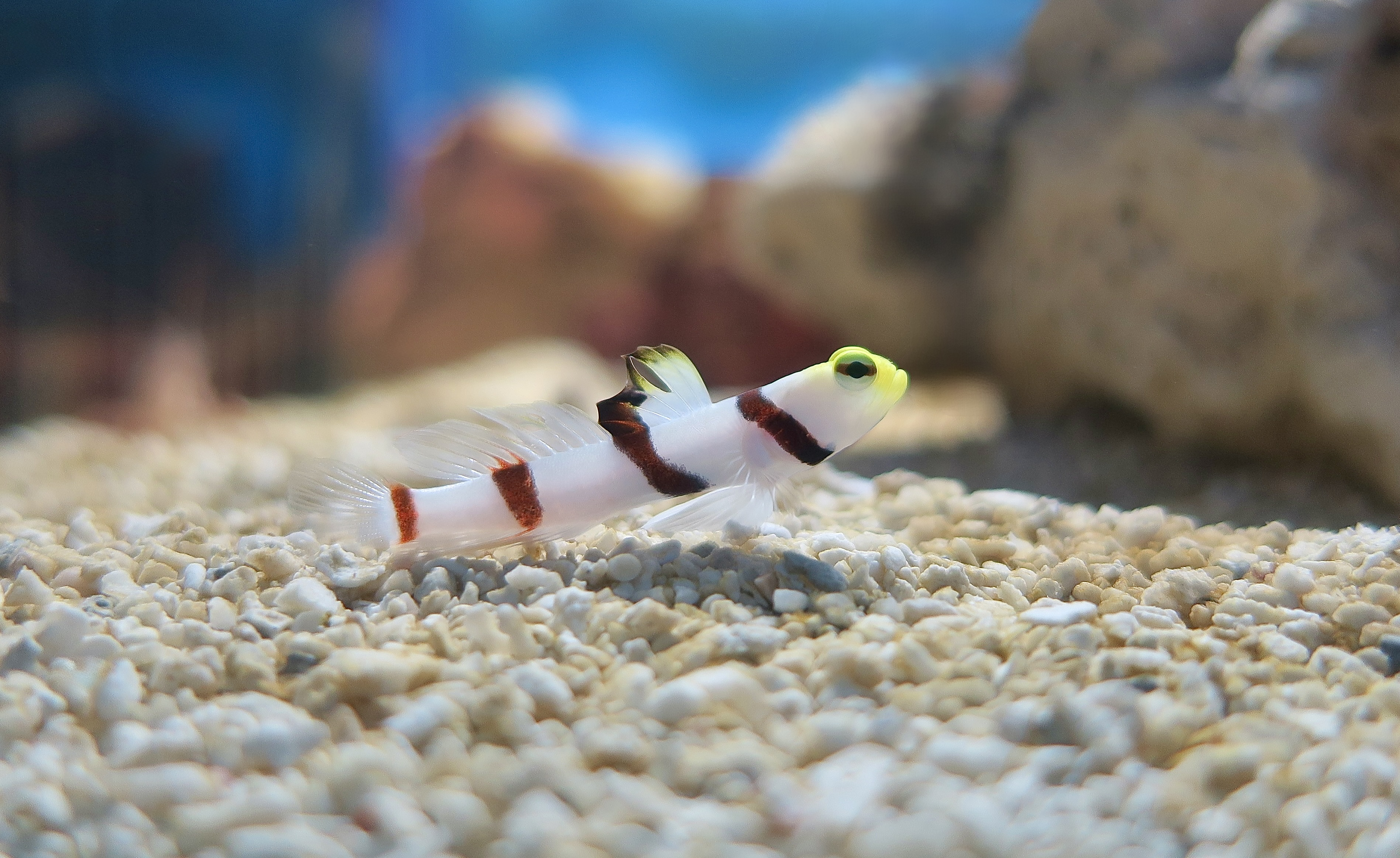

Scientific classification
- Kingdom: Animalia
- Phylum: Chordata
- Class: Actinopterygii
- Order: Gobiiformes
- Family: Gobiidae
- Genus: Stonogobiops
- Species: S. dracula

Binomial name
- Stonogobiops dracula Polunin & Lubbock, 1977

= Stonogobiops dracula =

Species of fish

Stonogobiops dracula, the Dracula shrimpgoby, is a species of goby native to reef environments around the Seychelles and the Maldives. It can be found at depths of 15 to 37 metres (49 to 121 ft) where it inhabits areas of rubble or sand near to the reefs where it is a commensal with the shrimp Alpheus randalli. This species can reach a length of 7 centimetres (2.8 in) TL.
