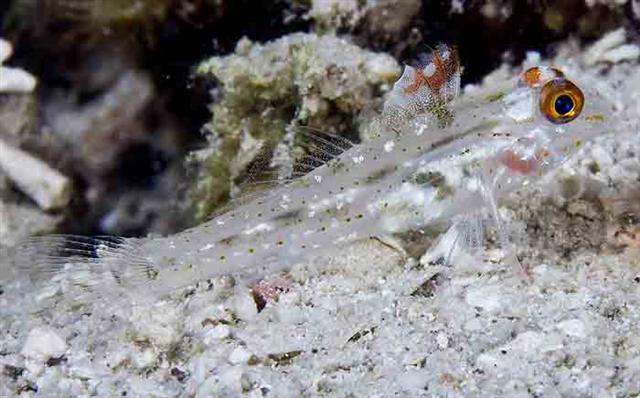

Scientific classification
- Kingdom: Animalia
- Phylum: Chordata
- Class: Actinopterygii
- Order: Gobiiformes
- Family: Gobiidae
- Genus: Fusigobius
- Species: F. signipinnis

Binomial name
- Fusigobius signipinnis Hoese & Obika, 1988

Synonyms
- Coryphopterus signipinnis (Hoese & Obika, 1988)

= Fusigobius signipinnis =

Species of fish

Fusigobius signipinnis, commonly called flasher sandgoby or signal goby among various vernacular names, is a species of marine fish in the family Gobiidae.

The flasher sandgoby is widespread throughout the tropical waters of the central Indo-Pacific from Indonesia to the Philippines.

This sandgoby is a small sized fish, it can grow up to a size of 35 millimetres (1.4 in) length.
