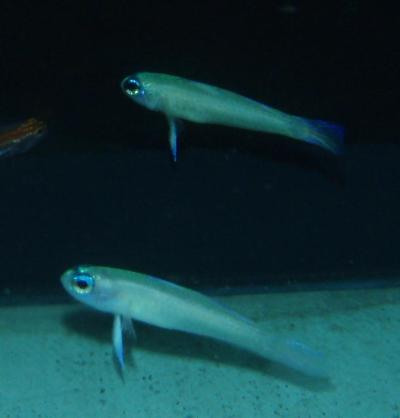

Scientific classification
- Domain: Eukaryota
- Kingdom: Animalia
- Phylum: Chordata
- Class: Actinopterygii
- Order: Gobiiformes
- Family: Gobiidae
- Genus: Tryssogobius
- Species: T. colini

Binomial name
- Tryssogobius colini Larson & Hoese, 2001

= Tryssogobius colini =

Species of fish

Tryssogobius colini, commonly named "Colin's fairygoby" or "tiny dartfish," is a species of fish in the genus Tryssogobius. It can be found in the tropical western Pacific Ocean. The species may grow to an average length of 3.5 cm. The tiny dartfish is generally a pale blue-gray color with various light blue or violet spots on its fins and head.

== Etymology ==
The specific name and common name honour the marine biologist Patrick L. Colin who as well as studying the biology of coral reefs collected the type specimen of this species as well in addition to other specimens.
