= Sueviota tubicola =

Scientific classification
- Kingdom: Animalia
- Phylum: Chordata
- Class: Actinopterygii
- Order: Gobiiformes
- Family: Gobiidae
- Genus: Sueviota
- Species: S. tubicola

Binomial name
- Sueviota tubicola G. R. Allen, & Erdmann, 2017

Species of fish

Sueviota tubicola, the tubeworm dwarfgoby, is a species of fish in the family Gobiidae. It is found in Papua New Guinea.

== Description ==
This species reaches a standard length of 1.8 cm (0.71 in).
