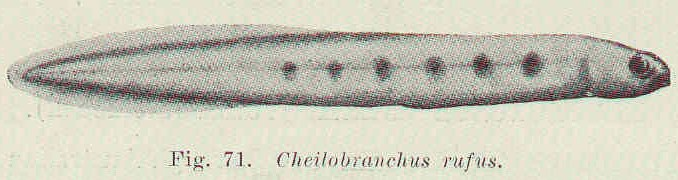
- Alabes dorsalis

Scientific classification
- Kingdom: Animalia
- Phylum: Chordata
- Class: Actinopterygii
- Order: Blenniiformes
- Family: Gobiesocidae
- Subfamily: Cheilobranchinae
- Genus: Alabes; Cloquet, 1816

Type species
- Alabes cuvieri Vaillant, 1905

Synonyms
- Cheilobranchus J. Richardson, 1845

= Alabes =

Genus of fishes

Alabes is a genus of clingfishes endemic to Australia along the coasts of the Indian and Pacific Oceans.

== Description ==
Fishes in the genus Alabes are small, eel-like fishes with narrow tapering bodies and small heads.

== Distribution ==
They are endemic to Australia along the coasts of the Indian and Pacific Oceans.

== Species ==
The currently recognised species in this genus are:

- Alabes bathys Hutchins, 2006
- Alabes brevis V. G. Springer & T. H. Fraser, 1976
- Alabes dorsalis (J. Richardson, 1845) (common shore-eel)
- Alabes elongata Hutchins & S. M. Morrison, 2004
- Alabes gibbosa Hutchins & S. M. Morrison, 2004
- Alabes hoesei V. G. Springer & T. H. Fraser, 1976 (dwarf shore-eel)
- Alabes obtusirostris Hutchins & S. M. Morrison, 2004
- Alabes occidentalis Hutchins & S. M. Morrison, 2004
- Alabes parvula (McCulloch, 1909) (pygmy shore-eel)
- Alabes scotti Hutchins & S. M. Morrison, 2004 (Note: Named by Barry Hutchins and Sue Morrison in honour of Eric Oswald Gale Scott, who brought the species to Hutchins' attention.)
- Alabes springeri Hutchins, 2006
