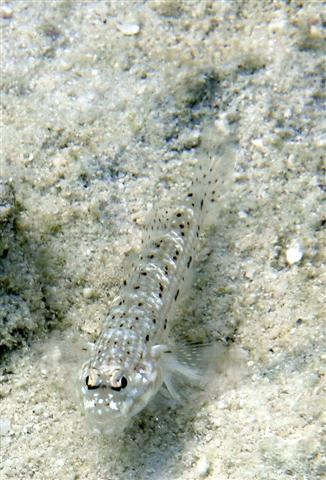
- Fusigobius neophytus

Scientific classification
- Kingdom: Animalia
- Phylum: Chordata
- Class: Actinopterygii
- Division: Teleostei
- Order: Gobiiformes
- Family: Gobiidae
- Genus: Fusigobius; Whitley, 1930

Type species
- Gobius neophytus Günther, 1877

Synonyms
- Thalassogobius Herre, 1953

= Fusigobius =

Genus of fishes

Fusigobius is a genus of coral reef inhabiting gobies found throughout the Indian and western Pacific Oceans.

== Species ==
There are currently nine recognized species in this genus:

- Fusigobius aureus I. S. Chen & K. T. Shao, 1997
- Fusigobius duospilus Hoese & Reader, 1985 (Barenape Goby)
- Fusigobius inframaculatus (J. E. Randall, 1994) (Blotched Sand Goby)
- Fusigobius longispinus Goren, 1978 (Orange-spotted Sand-goby)
- Fusigobius maximus (J. E. Randall, 2001)
- Fusigobius melacron (J. E. Randall, 2001)
- Fusigobius neophytus (Günther, 1877) (Common Fusegoby)
- Fusigobius pallidus (J. E. Randall, 2001)
- Fusigobius signipinnis Hoese & Obika, 1988 (Signalfin Goby)
- Fusigobius venadicus Carolin, Bajpai, Maurya & Schwarzhans, 2022 (otolith based fossil species, Burdigalian)
