= Sayonara fijiensis =

Conservation status
- Data Deficient (IUCN 3.1)

Scientific classification
- Kingdom: Animalia
- Phylum: Chordata
- Class: Actinopterygii
- Division: Teleostei
- Order: Perciformes
- Family: Anthiadidae
- Genus: Sayonara
- Species: S. fijiensis

Binomial name
- Sayonara fijiensis U. Raj & Seeto, 1983

Synonyms
- Plectranthias fijiensis Raj & Seeto, 1983

Species of fish

Sayonara fijiensis is a species of fish in the family Anthiadidae occurring in the western-central Pacific Ocean.

== Size ==
This species reaches a length of 7.5 cm (3.0 in).

== Etymology ==
The fish is endemic to Fiji.
