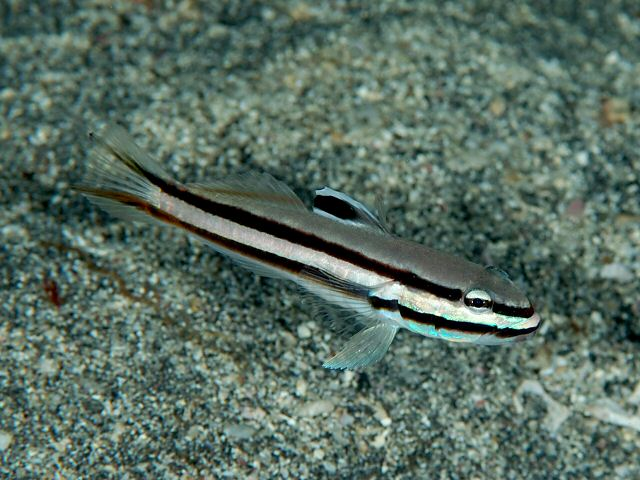

Conservation status
- Least Concern (IUCN 3.1)

Scientific classification
- Kingdom: Animalia
- Phylum: Chordata
- Class: Actinopterygii
- Order: Gobiiformes
- Family: Gobiidae
- Genus: Valenciennea
- Species: V. helsdingenii

Binomial name
- Valenciennea helsdingenii (Bleeker, 1858)

Synonyms
- Eleotriodes helsdingenii Bleeker, 1858; Calleleotris helsdingenii (Bleeker, 1858); Valenciennesia helsdingenii (Bleeker, 1858)

= Valenciennea helsdingenii =

Species of fish

Valenciennea helsdingenii is a species of goby from the Indo-Pacific. It is commonly known as the twostripe goby, black-lined sleeper goby, or railway sleeper goby. It can grow up to a length of 25 cm (9.8 in) and is distinguishable by two prominent orange to black lines running longitudinally through its body.

== Taxonomy ==
Twostripe gobies were first described by the Dutch ichthyologist Pieter Bleeker in 1858 as Eleotriodes helsdingenii. The type specimens were originally collected from Pulau-Pulau Gorong, Maluku, Indonesia. It belongs to the hover goby genus Valenciennea in the true goby family, Gobiidae. The specific name honours the Dutch civil servant W. F. C. van Helsdingen, who provided Bleeker with a number of well-preserved fish specimens from the Gorong Archipelago in the Dutch East Indies, including the type specimen of this species.

== Description ==
The body of twostripe gobies is elongated and laterally compressed. They are commonly 18 cm (7.1 in) in length, with a maximum length of 25 cm (9.8 in). The body is predominantly white to pale gray in color, with the dorsal surface a darker brownish gray. It has two prominent orange, dark red, reddish-brown, or black lines running longitudinally on the sides of its body, darkest at the anterior end and growing lighter towards the back. The upper line begins from the front of the snout, goes through the eye, and ends at the tip of the upper fork of the caudal fin. The lower line is parallel to the upper line and begins from the side of the upper lip, through the middle of the base of pectoral fins, and ends at the tip of the lower fork of the caudal fin. Both upper and lower lines are outlined in white at the caudal fin. A large oval black spot is also present between the third and fifth spines of the dorsal fin.

The pelvic fins are completely separated, no membrane is present between the first and the second dorsal fins. The first dorsal fin is shallow and its margin rounded, and the fourth spine is slightly longer than the other spines. The caudal fin in adults is deeply notched with two long filaments. Juveniles have more rounded caudal fins.

== Ecology ==
Twostripe gobies are relatively rare. They usually occur in pairs, but can be found alone in silty flat sand patches or rubble substrates. They are usually found on outer reefs at the bottom of coral or rocky dropoffs, rarely in lagoons. They feed on small digging (fossorial) organisms by sifting them from mouthfuls of sand.

Eggs hatch two days after spawning and the larvae reach lengths of 5.25 mm (0.207 in) after 35 days. Juveniles are usually found near rocks in clear estuaries.

The fish is carnivore, feeding on small invertebrates.

== Distribution ==
Twostripe gobies have a wide distribution range. They can be found in the temperate and tropical waters of the Indian Ocean and the western Pacific Ocean. From the coast of East Africa, the southern Red Sea, the Maldives, southeast India and Sri Lanka, Southeast Asia, Australia, western Oceania, and Japan.
