= Pygmy shore eel =

Conservation status
- Least Concern (IUCN 3.1)

Scientific classification
- Kingdom: Animalia
- Phylum: Chordata
- Class: Actinopterygii
- Order: Blenniiformes
- Family: Gobiesocidae
- Genus: Alabes
- Species: A. parvula

Binomial name
- Alabes parvula (McCulloch, 1909

Synonyms
- Cheilobranchus parvulus McCulloch, 1909

Species of fish

The pygmy shore eel (Alabes parvula) is a species of clingfish from the family Gobiesocidae. It is endemic to south eastern Australia where it can be found within seagrass beds and sometimes on rocky reefs at depths of less than 10 metres (33 ft) from Point Cartwright in Queensland to Flinders Island, South Australia; its range includes Tasmania. This species was described as Cheilobranchus parvulus by Allan Riverstone McCulloch in 1909 from a type locality of rockpools near Sydney.
