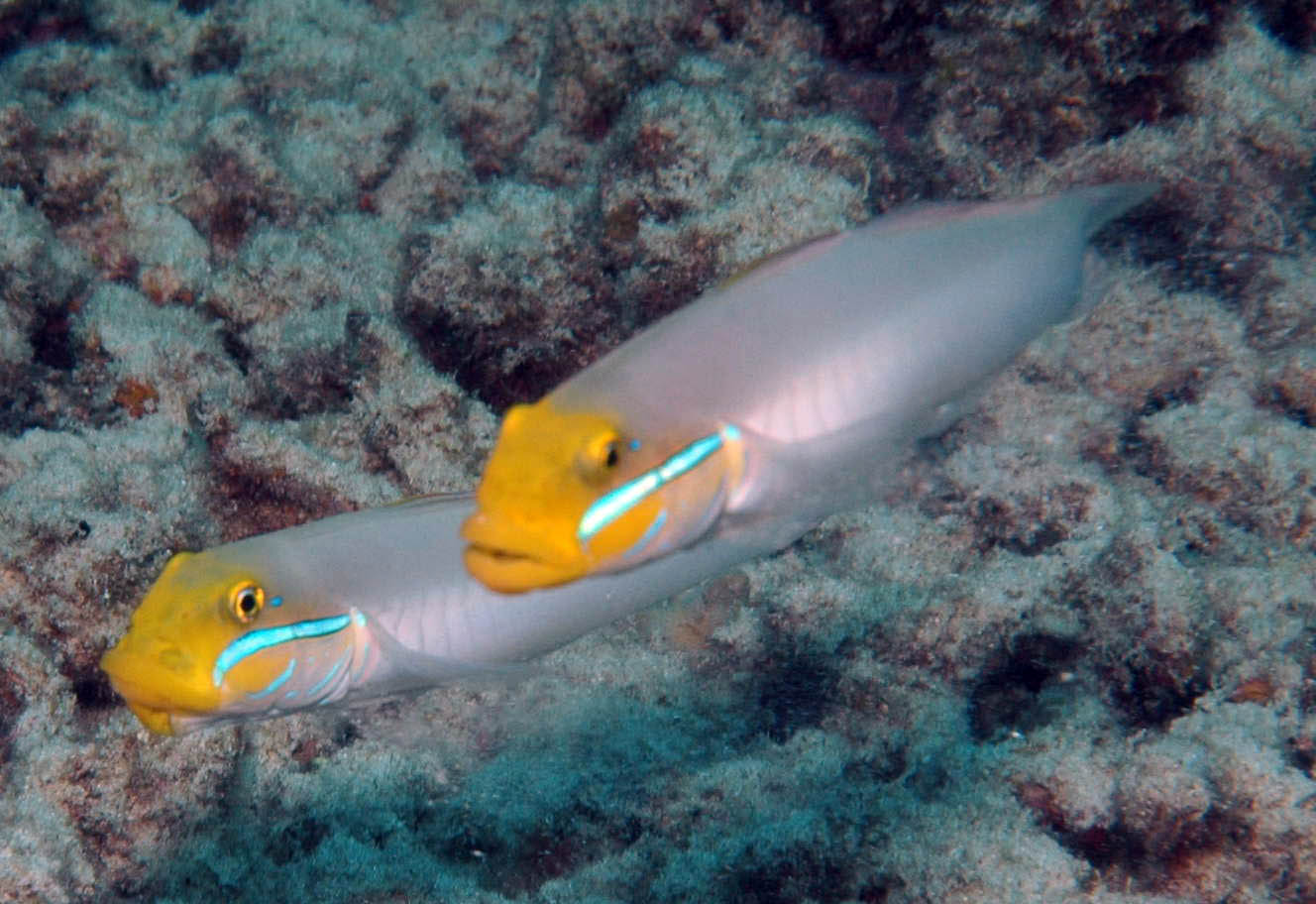

Scientific classification
- Domain: Eukaryota
- Kingdom: Animalia
- Phylum: Chordata
- Class: Actinopterygii
- Order: Gobiiformes
- Family: Gobiidae
- Genus: Valenciennea
- Species: V. strigata

Binomial name
- Valenciennea strigata (Broussonet, 1782)

Synonyms
- Gobius strigatus Broussonet, 1782; Eleotriodes strigatus (Broussonet, 1782); Gobiomorus taiboa Lacepède, 1800; Valenciennea strigata arcusbranchiae Fowler, 1946

= Valenciennea strigata =

Species of fish

Valenciennea strigata is a species of fish in the family Gobiidae, the gobies. Its common names include the blueband goby, golden-head sleeper goby, and pennant glider. It is native to the Indian Ocean and the western Pacific Ocean where it can be found in outer lagoons and the seaward side of reefs. It occurs in a variety of substrates, sand, rubble, hard, at depths of from 1 to 25 metres (3.3 to 82.0 ft) (usually at less than 6 metres (20 ft)). It primarily inhabits burrows dug under rubble, using them as both a nesting site and a refuge from predators. Such burrows typically have two entrances; however, only one of them is open, as the other is covered by rubble, sand, and algae. It can also be found in the aquarium trade. This species can reach a length of 18 centimetres (7.1 in) TL. It is the type species of the genus Valenciennea.
