= Sueviota larsonae =

Scientific classification
- Kingdom: Animalia
- Phylum: Chordata
- Class: Actinopterygii
- Order: Gobiiformes
- Family: Gobiidae
- Genus: Sueviota
- Species: S. larsonae

Binomial name
- Sueviota larsonae R. Winterbottom & Hoese, 1988

Species of fish

Sueviota larsonae, also known as Larson's sueviota, is a species of fish in the family Gobiidae. It is found in the western-central Pacific Ocean.

== Description ==
This species reaches a standard length of 2.2 cm (0.87 in).

== Entymology ==
The fish is named for the ichthyologist Helen K. Larson.
