= Dwarf shore eel =

Scientific classification
- Kingdom: Animalia
- Phylum: Chordata
- Class: Actinopterygii
- Order: Blenniiformes
- Family: Gobiesocidae
- Genus: Alabes
- Species: A. hoesei

Binomial name
- Alabes hoesei Springer & Fraser, 1976

Species of fish

The dwarf shore eel (Alabes hoesei) is a species of clingfish from the family Gobiesocidae. It is a small species which attains a maximum total length of 4.5 centimetres (1.8 in). This species is transparent and its internal organs are clearly visible through its skin. It occurs at depths of 0 to 5 metres (0 to 16 ft) within beds of seagrass and sometimes in nearby reefs. It is endemic to southern Australia where its range extends from near Sydney in New South Wales to Houtman Abrolhos in Western Australia, including the northern and eastern coast of Tasmania. This species was described by Victor G. Springer and Thomas H. Fraser in 1976 and the specific name honours the ichthyologist Douglass F. Hoese of the Australian Museum who provided Springer and Fraser with much of the material they used in their description.
