= Sueviota =

Scientific classification
- Kingdom: Animalia
- Phylum: Chordata
- Class: Actinopterygii
- Order: Gobiiformes
- Family: Gobiidae
- Genus: Sueviota; R. Winterbottom & Hoese, 1988

Type species
- Sueviota lachneri Winterbottom & Hoese, 1988

Genus of fishes

Sueviota is a genus of fish in the family Gobiidae native to the Indian and Pacific Ocean.

== Species ==
These are the currently recognized species in this genus:

- Sueviota aethon Nunes Peinemann, Pombo-Ayora, Tornabene, Berumen, 2024 (grumpy dwarfgoby)
- Sueviota aprica R. Winterbottom & Hoese, 1988 (Sunny dwarfgoby)
- Sueviota atrinasa R. Winterbottom & Hoese, 1988 (Black-nose dwarfgoby)
- Sueviota bryozophila G. R. Allen, Erdmann & Cahyani, 2016 (Bryozoan dwarfgoby)
- Sueviota lachneri R. Winterbottom & Hoese, 1988 (Lachner's dwarfgoby)
- Sueviota larsonae R. Winterbottom & Hoese, 1988 (Larson's dwarfgoby)
- Sueviota minersorum D. W. Greenfield, Erdmann & Utama, 2019 (Miner's dwarfgoby)
- Sueviota pyrios D. W. Greenfield & J. E. Randall, 2017 (Fiery dwarfgoby)
- Sueviota tubicola G. R. Allen & Erdmann, 2017 (Tube-worm dwarfgoby)
