= Sayonara robertsi =

Scientific classification
- Kingdom: Animalia
- Phylum: Chordata
- Class: Actinopterygii
- Division: Teleostei
- Order: Perciformes
- Family: Anthiadidae
- Genus: Sayonara
- Species: S. robertsi

Binomial name
- Sayonara robertsi (J. E. Randall & Hoese, 1995)

Synonyms
- Plectranthias robertsi

Species of fish

Sayonara robertsi, the filamentous perchlet, is a species of fish in the family Anthiadidae occurring in the western Pacific Ocean.

== Size ==
This species reaches a length of 9.0 cm (3.5 in).

== Etymology ==
The fish is named in honor of Clive D. Roberts, of the Museum of New Zealand Te Papa Tongarewa, who first recognized this species as an undescribed fish from a single specimen taken in Capricorn Channel off Queensland and he had plans to describe it when more material was collected. He heard of the authors’ research on the species, and he made his specimen available to them.
