= Fusigobius pallidus =

Conservation status
- Least Concern (IUCN 3.1)

Scientific classification
- Kingdom: Animalia
- Phylum: Chordata
- Class: Actinopterygii
- Order: Gobiiformes
- Family: Gobiidae
- Genus: Fusigobius
- Species: F. pallidus

Binomial name
- Fusigobius pallidus (Randall, 2001)

Synonyms
- Coryphopterus pallidus Randall, 2001

Species of fish

Fusigobius pallidus, commonly called pale sandgoby, is a species of marine fish in the family Gobiidae.

The pale sandgoby is widespread throughout the tropical waters of the Indo-West Pacific from the eastern coast of Africa to the Philippines.

This sandgoby is a small sized fish, it can grow up to a size of 60 millimetres (2.4 in) length.
