= Sayonara lasti =

Scientific classification
- Kingdom: Animalia
- Phylum: Chordata
- Class: Actinopterygii
- Division: Teleostei
- Order: Perciformes
- Family: Anthiadidae
- Genus: Sayonara
- Species: S. lasti

Binomial name
- Sayonara lasti (J. E. Randall & Hoese, 1995)

Synonyms
- Plectranthias lasti

Species of fish

Sayonara lasti, the trawl perchlet, is a species of fish in the family Anthiadidae occurring in the western Pacific Ocean.

== Size ==
This species reaches a length of 6.8 cm (2.7 in).

== Etymology ==
The fish is named in honor of ichthyologist Peter R. Last, of the CSIRO Division of Fisheries, who collected the paratype, and recognized it as an undescribed species, and made it available to the authors.
