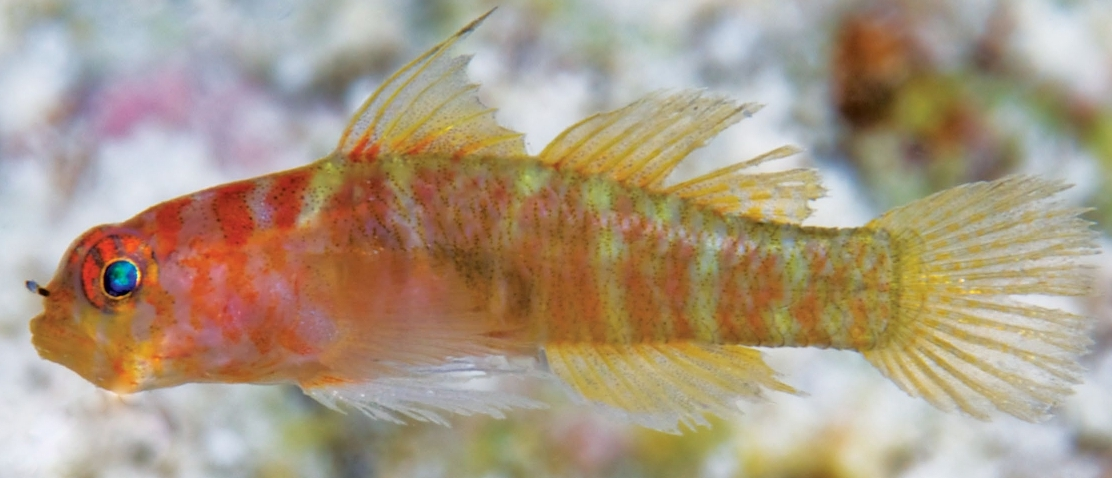

Scientific classification
- Kingdom: Animalia
- Phylum: Chordata
- Class: Actinopterygii
- Order: Gobiiformes
- Family: Gobiidae
- Genus: Sueviota
- Species: S. atrinasa

Binomial name
- Sueviota atrinasa R. Winterbottom & Hoese, 1988

= Sueviota atrinasa =

Species of fish

Sueviota atrinasa, the blacknose dwarfgoby, is a species of fish in the family Gobiidae. found in the Indo-West Pacific Ocean.

== Description ==
Sueviota atrinasa reaches a standard length of 2.0 cm (0.79 in).
