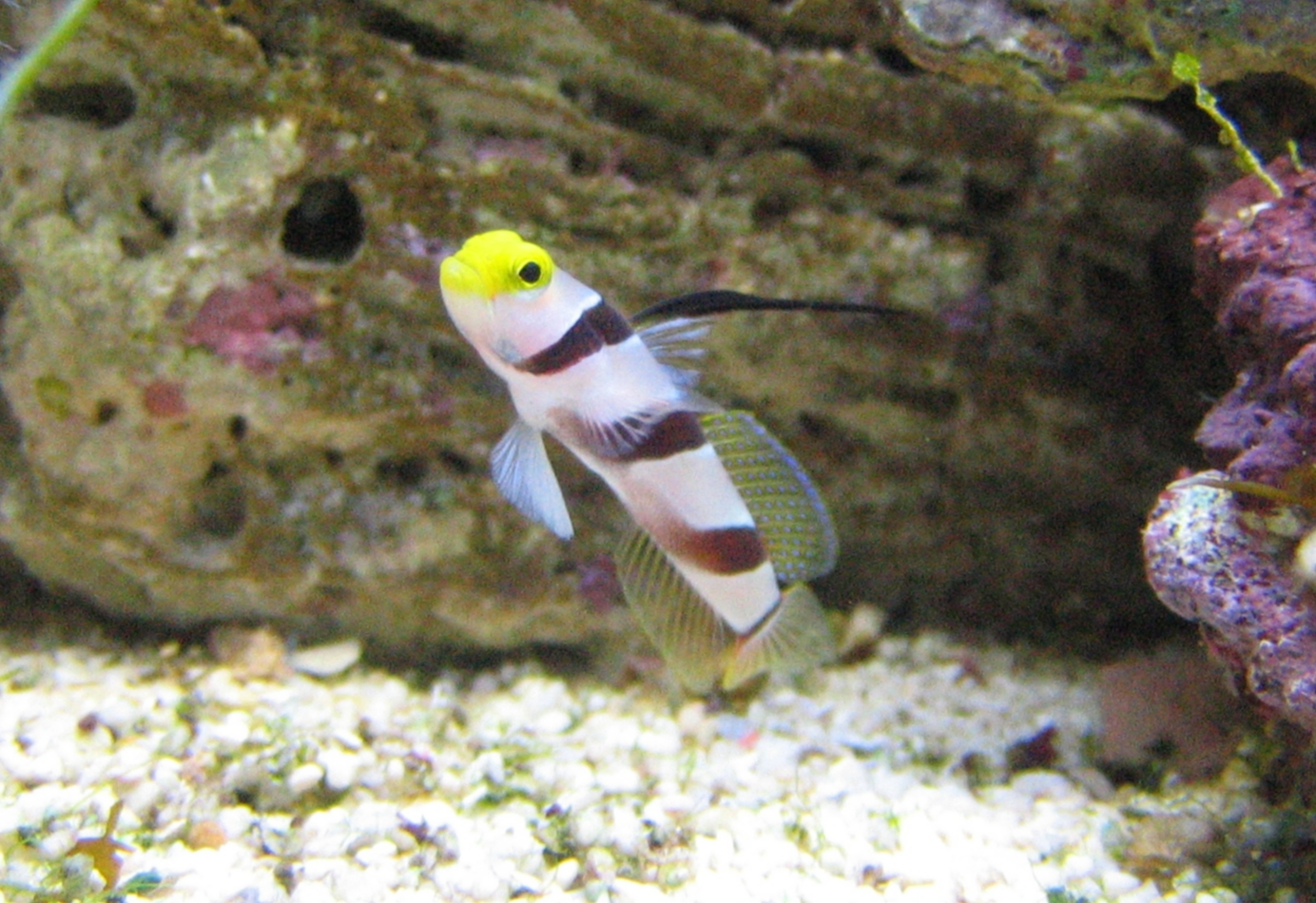

Scientific classification
- Kingdom: Animalia
- Phylum: Chordata
- Class: Actinopterygii
- Order: Gobiiformes
- Family: Gobiidae
- Genus: Stonogobiops
- Species: S. nematodes

Binomial name
- Stonogobiops nematodes Hoese & J. E. Randall, 1982

= Black-ray goby =

Species of fish

Stonogobiops nematodes, the Filament-finned prawn-goby, the Antenna goby, the high-fin goby, the red-banded goby, the high-fin red-banded goby, the striped goby, the barber-pole goby, or the black-ray Goby, is a species of marine goby native to the Indian Ocean and western Pacific Ocean from the Seychelles to the Philippines and Bali.

== Physical features ==
Adult fish can grow up to 6 centimetres (2.4 in) in length, with the striking pointed dorsal fin becoming more raised and pronounced in adulthood. This elongated fin is the most obvious distinguishing feature between the black-ray goby and its close cousin, the yellow snout goby (S. xanthorhinica). The fish are coloured with four diagonal brown stripes across a white body, and a distinctive yellow head.

It is almost impossible for anybody less than a specialised expert in the specific field of these types of fish to discern differences between males and females of the species.

== Natural environment ==
This goby inhabits sandy or sand-rubble bottoms adjacent to reefs at depths of from 15 to 25 metres (49 to 82 ft). It is one of several species that form commensal relationships with Randall's pistol shrimp (Alpheus randalli).

== Symbiotic Behavior ==
This species shares a burrow with its shrimp partner. The goby has much better eyesight than the shrimp, and, as such, acts as the watchman for both of them, keeping an eye out for danger. The shrimp spends the day digging a burrow in which both live. Burrows usually measure up to one inch in diameter, and can reach up to four feet in length. Burrows are constructed in the sand underneath rocks and other solid objects, such that the roof is solid material, and the shrimp may arrange shells to create extensions away from a rock the burrow is underneath.

The two animals maintain near-continuous contact whenever the shrimp leaves the burrow; the shrimp places one of its antennae on the goby's tail if the goby is in reach, and points an antenna towards the goby if the goby is hovering out of reach or if the shrimp needs to travel further. When danger threatens, the goby will make continuous flicks of its tail, warning the shrimp there is a predator nearby, and the shrimp will dart back into the burrow. If the danger reaches a certain level, the goby will dart into the burrow after the shrimp.

At night, the goby will go into the burrow, and the shrimp will sometimes collapse the entrance to close it off. If the burrow has been closed overnight, the shrimp then spends the next day rebuilding and rearranging the entrance to the burrow. Both animals have also been known to share food with each other.

When the goby catches food, it will often give a portion of it to the pistol shrimp, through a somewhat similar process of a mother bird regurgitating food to her chicks. This way, the shrimp and the goby are kept well fed. Sometimes, if the shrimp is not kept well fed, it will resort to killing the goby.

In the wild, most burrows are shared by male and female goby pairs, with their respective shrimp partners, and the female goby will use this burrow as a nesting site to lay her eggs.

The obvious benefits to both organisms of this symbiotic relationship make the interaction a form of mutualism. Here is an interesting example of this. The other fish is a dartfish (genus Ptereleotris). These fish are often found as unwelcome but ignored guests sharing the burrow with goby and shrimp.

== Aquarium keeping ==
=== Black-ray goby in commercial trade ===
This goby is in high demand for home and hobby marine aquaria due to its beautiful colouration, docile nature and interesting interaction with symbiotic shrimp. This type of goby is the most common Stonogobiops species to show up in the marine trade, but is still quite rare.

=== Behaviour and compatibility ===
This fish is very docile and poses almost no threat to any other stock inhabiting a typical marine aquarium. This passiveness makes it a perfect tankmate for delicate species like sea horses or pipefish. In fact, it is in reality quite shy, and when first introduced into an aquarium, may take up to several weeks before it is bold enough to leave its hiding place, or bolt hole. While this fish can display aggression towards other tank inhabitants by opening its mouth and "yawning" at them, this is mostly show, and the goby will quickly turn tail and hide if confronted.

The goby will spend most of its time hovering about two inches above its bolt hole, searching for scraps of food in the water column. If scared or startled, it will slowly retreat towards its hole. If the danger does not go away, it will dart inside at lightning speed.

Mated pairs of this fish are very rare and difficult to attain. Individual males may fight if placed in a tank smaller than about 50 gallons (~200 litres).

=== Tank environment ===
For successful aquarium culture, this fish needs good sand/coral rubble cover for burrow-building and much rock cover; a reef environment is suitable. The recommended minimum tank size is 10 gallons (40 litres), however these fish mainly hide out in burrows all day, and are not active swimmers, making them candidates for smaller "pico" aquariums. (Aquariums 4 gallons and under.) The water specific gravity should be 1.020 - 1.025, with a pH of 8.1 - 8.4; water temperature at 72–78 °F (22–26 °C) is ideal, however water temperature up to 80 °F (27 °C) will not harm the fish.

=== Care and maintenance ===
Small meaty foods, such as mysid (sometimes referred to as mysis shrimp) or brine shrimp, along with flake food and algae wafers, spirulina, etc. are all happily accepted. In the wild, these gobies most often feed on zooplankton. The water quality must be kept reasonably high, as with all marine species. A substrate of small-grained coral sand, with larger particles mixed in (preferably four inches or deeper) is ideal for the goby/shrimp pair to make their burrow.
