= Pascua caudilinea =

Scientific classification
- Kingdom: Animalia
- Phylum: Chordata
- Class: Actinopterygii
- Order: Gobiiformes
- Family: Gobiidae
- Genus: Pascua
- Species: P. caudilinea

Binomial name
- Pascua caudilinea J. E. Randall, 2005

Synonyms
- Hetereleotris caudilinea (J. E. Randall, 2005)

Species of fish

Pascua caudilinea, the Pascua goby, is a species of goby endemic to the waters around Easter Island. It has only been recorded from tide pools down to a depth of 40 metres (130 ft). This species can reach a length of 2.8 centimetres (1.1 in) SL (standard length).
