= Navigobius dewa =

Scientific classification
- Domain: Eukaryota
- Kingdom: Animalia
- Phylum: Chordata
- Class: Actinopterygii
- Order: Gobiiformes
- Family: Gobiidae
- Genus: Navigobius
- Species: N. dewa

Binomial name
- Navigobius dewa Hoese & Motomura, 2009

Species of fish

Navigobius dewa is a species of dartfish native to the western Pacific Ocean where it is only known from the waters around southern Japan. This species grows to a length of 40.7 centimetres (16.0 in) SL.

== Etymology ==
The fish is named in honor of Shin-ichi Dewa of Kagoshima, Japan, who collected the type specimen.
