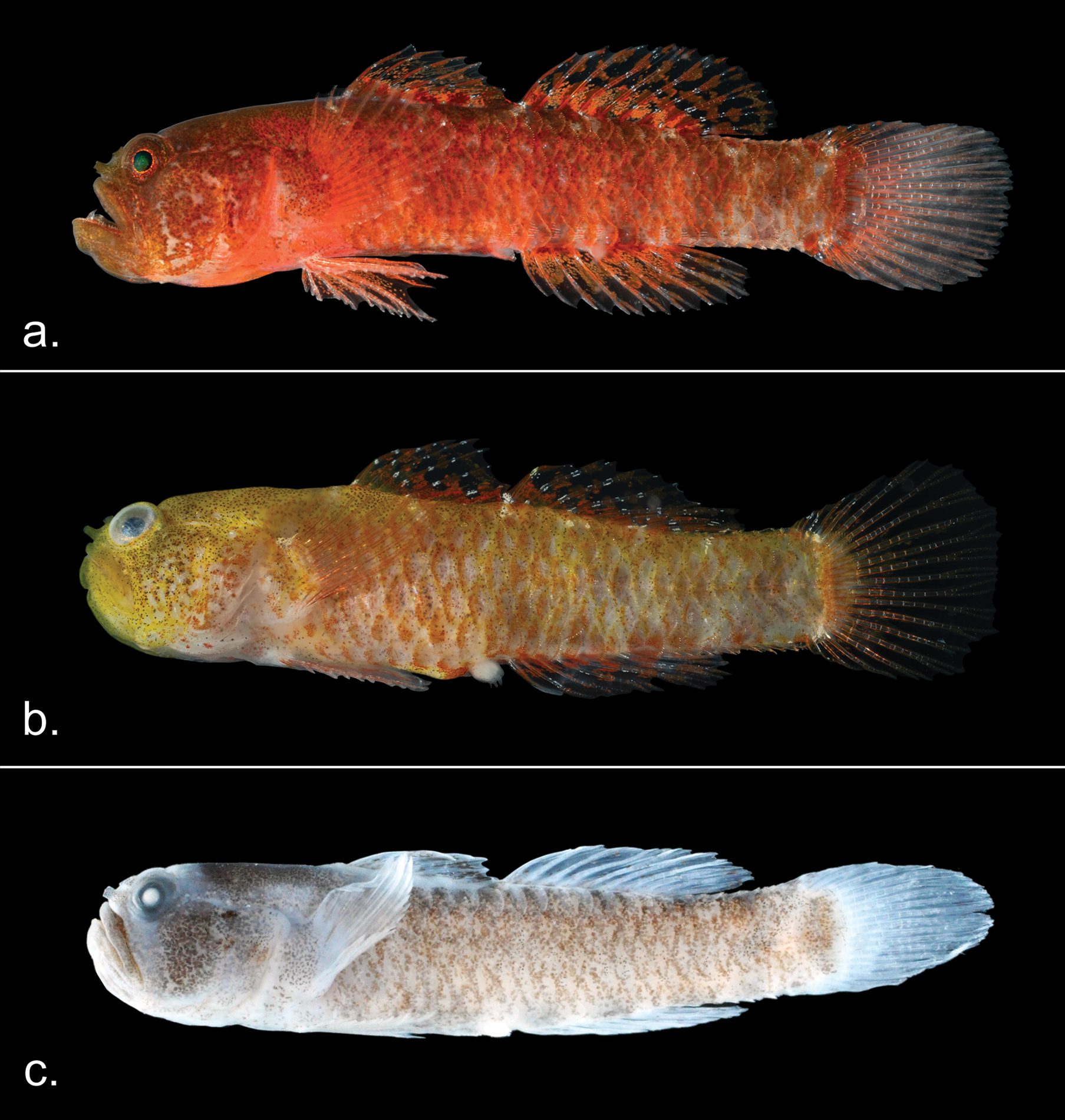

Scientific classification
- Kingdom: Animalia
- Phylum: Chordata
- Class: Actinopterygii
- Order: Gobiiformes
- Family: Gobiidae
- Genus: Sueviota
- Species: S. aethon

Binomial name
- Sueviota aethon Nunes Peinemann, Pombo-Ayora, Tornabene, Berumen , 2024

= Sueviota aethon =

Species of fish

Sueviota aethon, the grumpy dwarfgoby, is a species of goby endemic to the Red Sea, and can grow to 17 millimetres (0.67 in) in length. It is closely related to members of the Eviota genus, possessing many similar characteristics such as morphology, ecology, and distribution.

== Characteristics ==
The grumpy dwarfgoby is characterized by its disgruntled expression and large canines which play a crucial role in its feeding habits, allowing it to effectively hunt small prey, as well as its bright red coloration which it uses to blend in with the surrounding environment.

== Behavior ==
Observations of the grumpy dwarfgoby indicate that it typically inhabits depths ranging from 10 to 30 metres (30 to 100 ft). This depth range is where the fish finds shelter among the holes and crevices among the walls, and overhangs of coral reefs, as well as access to various food sources, such as tiny invertebrates, which it will capture using its large canines. However, it is noteworthy that a sample of the grumpy dwarfgoby has also been recorded at a depth of 53 metres (170 ft). This observation suggests that the species may survive in a broader range of underwater environments than previously thought. This fish appears to be a very rare species as it was discovered in 2024.

== Similarities to other species ==
Sueviota aethon most closely resembles Sueviota pyrios, a species found in the northern Red Sea's Gulf of Aqaba.
