= Paratrimma =

Scientific classification
- Kingdom: Animalia
- Phylum: Chordata
- Class: Actinopterygii
- Order: Gobiiformes
- Family: Gobiidae
- Genus: Paratrimma; Hoese & Brothers, 1976

Type species
- Paratrimma nigrimenta Hoese & Brothers, 1976

Genus of fishes

Paratrimma is a genus of gobies endemic to Chile where they are only found around the Juan Fernández Islands and the Desventuradas Islands in the southeastern Pacific Ocean.

== Species ==
There are currently two recognized species in this genus:

- Paratrimma nigrimenta Hoese & Brothers, 1976
- Paratrimma urospila Hoese & Brothers, 1976
