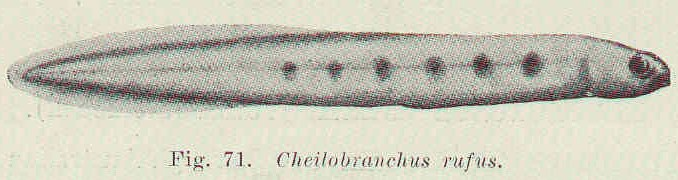

Scientific classification
- Kingdom: Animalia
- Phylum: Chordata
- Class: Actinopterygii
- Order: Blenniiformes
- Family: Gobiesocidae
- Genus: Alabes
- Species: A. dorsalis

Binomial name
- Alabes dorsalis (Richardson, 1845)

Synonyms
- Cheilobranchus dorsalis Richardson, 1845; Cheilobranchus aptenodytum Richardson, 1845; Chilobranchus rufus Macleay, 1881; Alabes cuvieri Vaillant, 1905

= Common shore eel =

Species of fish

The common shore eel (Alabes dorsalis) is a species of clingfish from Australia. It is generally found in the south-eastern waters of Australia. It usually grows to about 12 cms (4.7 in). Often found by beachgoers after looking in rock-pools and turning over shells.

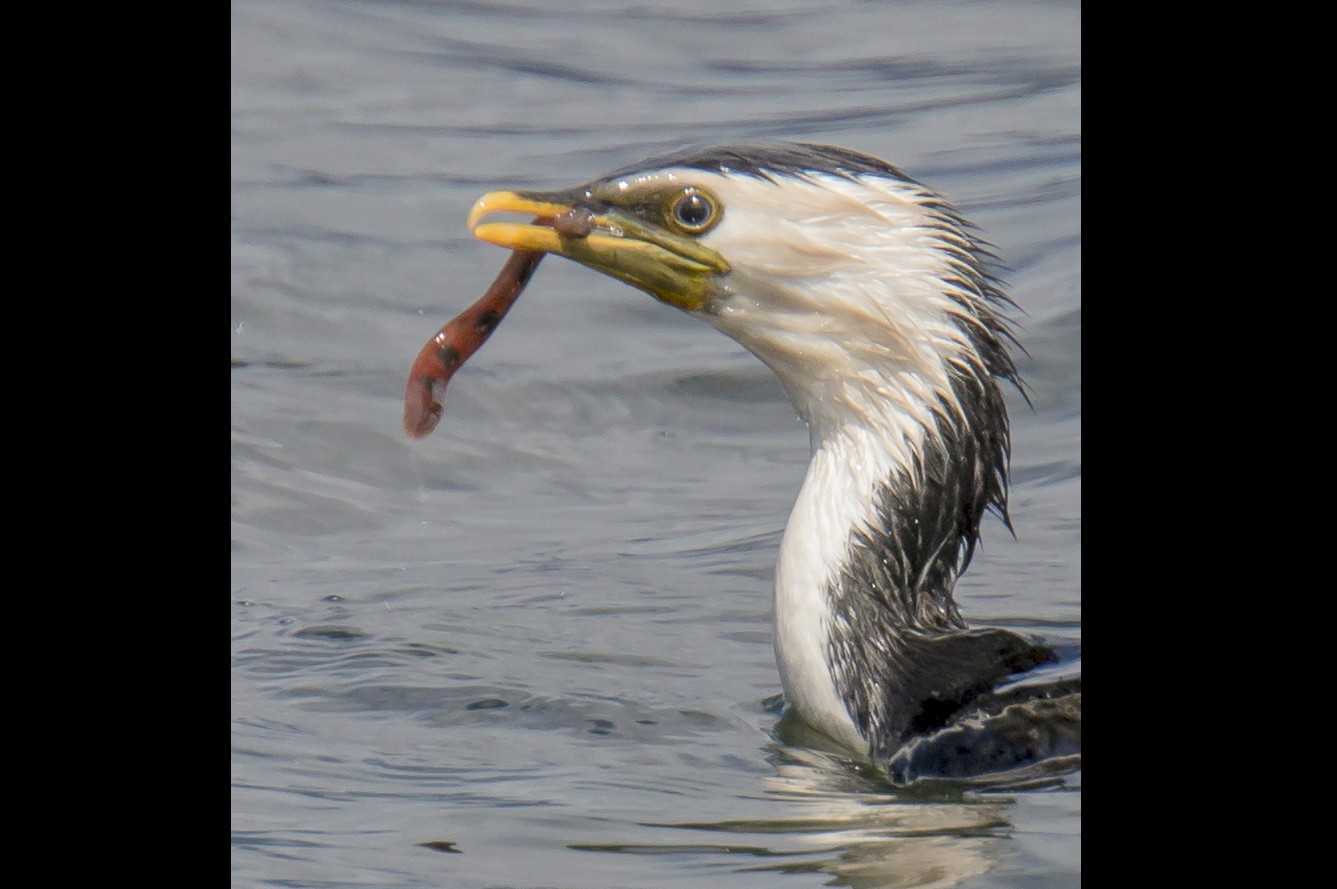
A little pied cormorant with a common shore eel, Alabes dorsalis, at the Bellerive waterfront, Derwent River, Tasmania

== Description ==
The common shore eel is a large brownish-orange to bright green eel-like fish, it sometimes has a line of large blackish spots along its flanks. It has a short head with small eyes, a small mouth and a small gill slit on the underside of its head which is about the same length as the diameter of its eye. There is a single sensory pore above and behind the eyes. The dorsal, the anal and the caudal fin are joined into a single fin. The pectoral fins are much reduced and are situated just behind the gill slits and are roughly the same length as the gill slits. The dorsal, caudal and anal fins have no rays within them . There is a vestigial disc-like sucker between the pelvic fins. The maximum length of a common shore eel is 12 centimetres (4.7 in) in total length.

== Distribution ==
The common shore eel is a temperate species which is endemic to southern Australia. Its range may extend as far north as Queensland but it certainly found from Broken Bay, New South Wales south and west as far as just south-west of Ceduna, South Australia. It also occurs around the coast of Tasmania. This species is frequently encountered by people searching in rock pools and turning over rocks on beaches, especially in Victoria and South Australia.

== Habitat and biology ==
The common shore eel occurs under rocks and shells from the intertidal zone down to depths of 10 metres (33 ft), though some sources say it can live up to a depth of 30 metres (98 ft), it can also be found among weeds.
