= Sueviota pyrios =

Scientific classification
- Kingdom: Animalia
- Phylum: Chordata
- Class: Actinopterygii
- Order: Gobiiformes
- Family: Gobiidae
- Genus: Sueviota
- Species: S. pyrios

Binomial name
- Sueviota pyrios D. W. Greenfield & J. E. Randall, 2017

Species of fish

Sueviota pyrios, the fiery dwarfgoby, is a species of fish in the family Gobiidae.

== Description ==
This species reaches a standard length of 1.7 cm (0.67 in).

== Distribution ==
Sueviota pyrios is endemic to the Gulf of Aqaba in the northern Red Sea.
