= Sueviota lachneri =

Conservation status
- Least Concern (IUCN 3.1)2016-3.RLTS.T193127A2198674.en. Accessed on 08 March 2024.

Scientific classification
- Kingdom: Animalia
- Phylum: Chordata
- Class: Actinopterygii
- Order: Gobiiformes
- Family: Gobiidae
- Genus: Sueviota
- Species: S. lachneri

Binomial name
- Sueviota lachneri R. Winterbottom & Hoese, 1988

Species of fish

Sueviota lachneri, also known as Lachner's dwarfgoby, is a species of fish in the family Gobiidae. found in the Maldives.

== Description ==
This species reaches a standard length of 2.1 cm (0.83 in).

== Entymology ==
Sueviota lachneri is named for American ichthyologist Ernest A. Lachner of the United States National Museum of Natural History.
