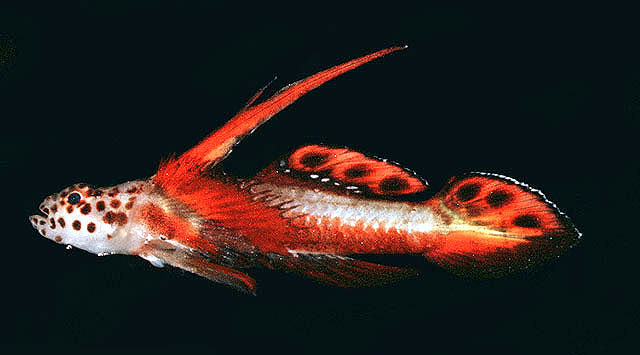

Conservation status
- Least Concern (IUCN 3.1)

Scientific classification
- Kingdom: Animalia
- Phylum: Chordata
- Class: Actinopterygii
- Order: Gobiiformes
- Family: Gobiidae
- Genus: Discordipinna
- Species: D. griessingeri

Binomial name
- Discordipinna griessingeri Hoese and Fourmanoir, 1978

= Discordipinna griessingeri =

Spikefin goby

Species of fish

Discordipinna griessingeri is a small, brightly colored, marine neritic fish in the family Gobiidae that is commonly called the spikefin goby or flaming prawn goby. Occasionally it is mislabeled as "Stonogobiops griessingeri" which is a binomial species name that does not formally exist. The spikefin goby has a wide distribution across reefs throughout the western tropical Pacific, Pacific Islands such as Hawai'i or Polynesia, the Indian Ocean, and the Red Sea. It is also occasionally collected and traded as an exotic aquarium fish in multiple countries.

== Description ==
Discordipinna griessingeri is mostly white in the body, with orange stripes down the body and length of the dorsal fin, and dark spots on the face. Additionally, they have a large protruding dorsal fin just behind the head that characterizes them. The pectoral fin rays are also elongated. The body of spikefin gobies are completely scaled, with ctenoid scales on the posterior and cycloid scales on the anterior. It is between 10 and 22 mm (0.5-0.75 in) in SL as an adult. Sexual dimorphism, if any, within the species is currently unknown.

== Distribution and habitat ==
The spikefin goby is found throughout the western Pacific Ocean, as well as in the Indian Ocean and the Red Sea. It is a benthic fish that inhabits crevices and pockets in coral reefs between 2 and 50 meters in depth along the reef rock, rubble, and sand. It is reclusive and is not associated with burrows or prawns.

== Binomial name ==
The genus name comes from Latin, where discors translates to English as "different", and pinna translates as "fin". This is in reference to the peculiar location of the highly elongated dorsal fin, and the long rays of the dorsal and pectoral fins of the genus. The species name is after Mr. S. Griessinger, the collector of one of the paratype specimens.
