= Sleeper goby =

Sleeper goby may refer to three families of goby formerly classified as part of the single family Eleotridae, and a genus from the family Gobiidae:

- Milyeringidae, a family of Gobiiform cave fish from Western Australia and Madagascar
- Butidae, an Old World family of gobies
- Eleotridae, a widespread family also which in its widest sense were known as "sleeper gobies"
- Valenciennea, a genus of small, bottom-dwelling fish in the family Gobiidae
