= Fusigobius aureus =

Scientific classification
- Kingdom: Animalia
- Phylum: Chordata
- Class: Actinopterygii
- Order: Gobiiformes
- Family: Gobiidae
- Genus: Fusigobius
- Species: F. aureus

Binomial name
- Fusigobius aureus I. S. Chen & K. T. Shao, 1997

Synonyms
- Coryphopterus aureus (I. S. Chen & K. T. Shao, 1997)

Species of fish

Fusigobius aureus is a species of goby native to coral reefs around Indonesia and the Solomon Islands and in the Coral Sea.

This is a distinctive species, largely translucent with numerous yellow spots on the body and fins and a yellow line on the head. There is a small black mark at the base of the caudal fin and an extensive black blotch on the first dorsal fin. The pelvic fins are almost entirely separated. This fish grows to around 3.5 centimetres (1.4 in) SL.

== Etymology ==
"aureus" (Latin - "yellow") refers to the golden-yellow spots covering the body and fins of this species.
