= Sayonara xanthomaculata =

Conservation status
- Least Concern (IUCN 3.1)

Scientific classification
- Kingdom: Animalia
- Phylum: Chordata
- Class: Actinopterygii
- Division: Teleostei
- Order: Perciformes
- Family: Anthiadidae
- Genus: Sayonara
- Species: S. xanthomaculata

Binomial name
- Sayonara xanthomaculata (K. Y. Wu, J. E. Randall & J. P. Chen, 2011)

Synonyms
- Plectranthias xanthomaculatus

Species of fish

Sayonara xanthomaculata is a species of fish in the family Anthiadidae occurring in the north-western Pacific Ocean.

== Size ==
This species reaches a length of 5.8 cm (2.3 in).
