= Mitchell gudgeon =

Conservation status
- Vulnerable (IUCN 3.1)

Scientific classification
- Kingdom: Animalia
- Phylum: Chordata
- Class: Actinopterygii
- Order: Gobiiformes
- Family: Eleotridae
- Genus: Hypseleotris
- Species: H. hutchinsi

Binomial name
- Hypseleotris hutchinsi Hoese & G. R. Allen, 1987

Species of fish

The Mitchell gudgeon (Hypseleotris hutchinsi) is a species of fish in the family Eleotridae endemic to the Kimberley region of Australia, where it is only known from the Mitchell River system. This species can reach a length of 4 cm (1.6 in). The specific name honours the ichthyologist J. Barry Hutchins (b. 1946) of the Western Australian Museum, who collected the type.

This species was formerly assigned to the genus Kimberleyeleotris but was synonymized with Hypseleotris in 2023.
