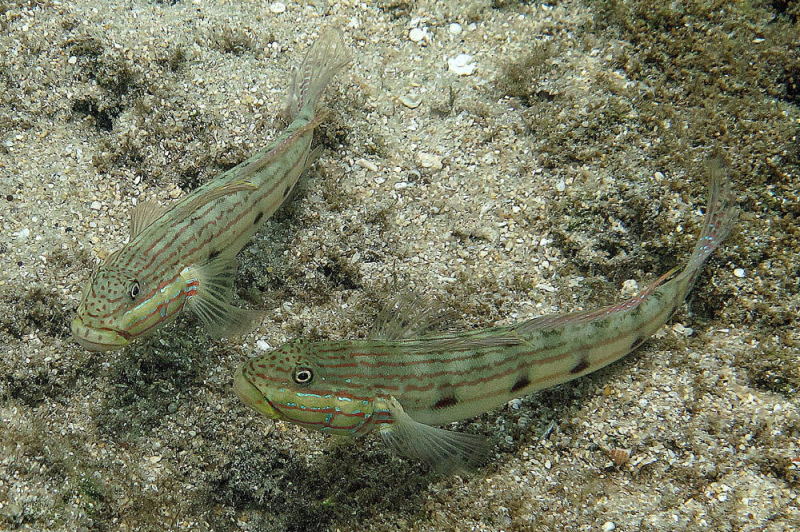

Scientific classification
- Kingdom: Animalia
- Phylum: Chordata
- Class: Actinopterygii
- Division: Teleostei
- Order: Gobiiformes
- Family: Gobiidae
- Genus: Valenciennea
- Species: V. longipinnis

Binomial name
- Valenciennea longipinnis (Lay & E. T. Bennett, 1839)

Synonyms
- Eleotris longipinnis Lay & E. T. Bennett, 1839; Calleleotris longipinnis (Lay & E. T. Bennett, 1839); Eleotriodes longipinnis (Lay & E. T. Bennett, 1839); Eleotris ikeineur Montrouzier, 1857; Eleotris lineatooculatus Kner, 1867; Eleotris taeniura W. J. Macleay, 1881

= Valenciennea longipinnis =

Species of fish

Valenciennea longipinnis, the long-finned goby, is a species of goby native to the Indian Ocean and the western Pacific Ocean. The long-finned goby can be found in lagoons and areas with substrates of fine sand at depths less than 3 metres (9.8 ft), occasionally down to 6 metres (20 ft) but only rarely deeper than that. This species can reach a length of 18 centimetres (7.1 in) SL. The long-finned goby is of minor importance to local commercial fisheries and can also be found in the aquarium trade.

== See also ==
- Maned goby
