= Drysdale gudgeon =

Conservation status
- Critically endangered, possibly extinct (IUCN 3.1)

Scientific classification
- Kingdom: Animalia
- Phylum: Chordata
- Class: Actinopterygii
- Order: Gobiiformes
- Family: Eleotridae
- Genus: Hypseleotris
- Species: H. notata

Binomial name
- Hypseleotris notata Hoese & G. R. Allen, 1987

Species of fish

The Drysdale gudgeon (Hypseleotris notata) is a species of fish in the family Eleotridae endemic to the Kimberley region of Australia, where it is only known from the Drysdale River system. It inhabits rocky pools and slow flowing streams. The species can reach a length of 4 cm (1.6 in). It has a light brown to purplish coloration, whitish along the belly. A series of dark brown to black bars are present along the sides, which become V-shaped towards the posterior.

This species was formerly assigned to the genus Kimberleyeleotris but was synonymized with Hypseleotris in 2023.
