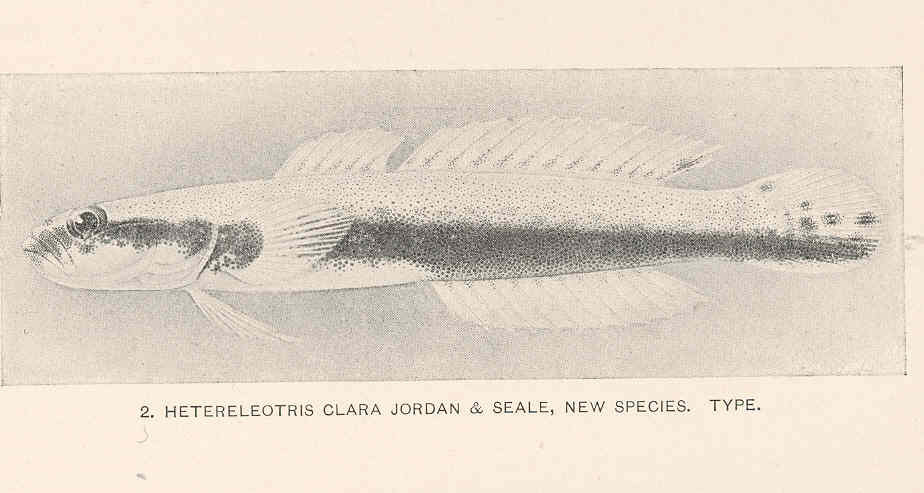
- Hetereleotris clara Jordan & Seale

Scientific classification
- Kingdom: Animalia
- Phylum: Chordata
- Class: Actinopterygii
- Order: Gobiiformes
- Family: Gobiidae
- Genus: Hetereleotris; Bleeker, 1874

Type species
- Gobius diadematus Rüppell, 1830

Synonyms
- Chriolepidops Smith, 1958; Dactyleleotris Smith, 1958; Leioeleotris Fowler, 1934; Lioteres Smith, 1958; Pseudolioteres Smith, 1958; Riukiuia Fowler, 1946; Satulinus Smith, 1958

= Hetereleotris =

Genus of fishes

Hetereleotris is a genus of gobies native to the western Indian Ocean and the western Pacific Ocean.

== Species ==
There are currently 18 recognized species in this genus:

- Hetereleotris apora Hoese & R. Winterbottom, 1979 (Poreless goby)
- Hetereleotris bipunctata Tortonese, 1976
- Hetereleotris caminata J. L. B. Smith, 1958 (Mourner)
- Hetereleotris diademata Rüppell, 1830
- Hetereleotris dorsovittata Kovačić & Bogorodsky, 2014
- Hetereleotris exilis Shibukawa, 2010
- Hetereleotris georgegilli A. C. Gill, 1998 (Gill's goby)
- Hetereleotris kenyae J. L. B. Smith, 1958
- Hetereleotris margaretae Hoese, 1986 (Smooth-scale goby)
- Hetereleotris nebulofasciata J. L. B. Smith, 1958
- Hetereleotris poecila Fowler, 1946
- Hetereleotris psammophila Kovačić & Bogorodsky, 2014
- Hetereleotris readerae Hoese & Larson, 2005
- Hetereleotris tentaculata J. L. B. Smith, 1958 (Locusthead)
- Hetereleotris vinsoni Hoese, 1986 (Vinson's goby)
- Hetereleotris vulgaris Klunzinger, 1871
- Hetereleotris zanzibarensis J. L. B. Smith, 1958 (Goggle goby)
- Hetereleotris zonata Fowler, 1934 (Goggles)
