= Douglass F. Hoese =

American ichthyologist (born 1942)

- Born: Douglass Fielding Hoese; April 17, 1942 (age 84); Bexar County, Texas, United States
- Education: University of Texas (B.A., Zoology); University of California, San Diego (Ph.D., Marine Biology)
- Known for: Taxonomy and systematics of gobioid fishes (Gobiodei)
- Scientific career
- Fields: Ichthyology, Marine biology
- Workplaces: Australian Museum, Scripps Institution of Oceanography
- Thesis: A Revision of the Eastern Pacific Species of the Gobiid Fish Genus Gobiosoma: With a Discussion of Relationships of the Genus (1971)

Douglass Fielding Hoese (born April 17, 1942, in Bexar County, Texas) is an American ichthyologist and marine biologist who has worked extensively in Australia. He is frequently cited as Douglass F. Hoese.

== Biography ==
Hoese is the son of Adolph Hermann Hoese and Feliciana Douglas Dickson. He received a B.A. in zoology from the University of Texas in 1964, and earned his Ph.D. in marine biology at the University of California, San Diego in 1971 with the dissertation A Revision of the Eastern Pacific Species of the Gobiid Fish Genus Gobiosoma: With a Discussion of Relationships of the Genus.

From 1965 to 1970, Hoese worked part-time as a research assistant in fish systematics at the Scripps Institution of Oceanography. In 1971, he was appointed assistant curator of fishes at the Australian Museum in Sydney. That same year, the Australian Society for Fish Biology (ASFB) was officially founded, and in 1973 Hoese was elected its third president after John Sydney Lake and Gilbert Percy Whitley. He also served as secretary from 1975 to 1977 and as a council member in 1977 and 1978.

From 1976 to 1981, Hoese was curator of fishes at the Australian Museum, but also held various other positions as the museum reorganized its staff and research groups. He was head of the Marine Group in 1981, scientific officer from 1982 to 1988, chair of the Vertebrate Zoology department from 1983 to 1987, principal research scientist from 1988 to 1999, head of Vertebrate Zoology and Scientific Services from 1989 to 1998, and director of Science from 1999 to 2004. He retired in 2004 but continues as a research associate at the museum.

Hoese’s research focuses primarily on the systematics of Gobiodei (gobioid fishes), a group with over 2,500 species. This group represents about 10% of all known recent fish species, about 15% of all reef-dwelling fishes in Australia, and 20–40% of species in Australian estuaries. His studies have provided an improved taxonomic framework for gobioids, which has facilitated other research. Over more than four decades, he has compiled a database of all described and recognized genera and species, as well as an extensive bibliography of the group.

His taxonomic research has concentrated on three main areas:

- Taxonomic revisions of genera, especially Glossogobius and Eleotris.
- Defining genera and their relationships: earlier classifications recognized many monotypic Indo-Pacific gobioid genera with little agreement in the literature. Hoese’s studies reduced the number of accepted genera by about 30%, resulting in broad consensus in current literature.
- Higher classification and relationships of major taxonomic groups (families and subfamilies). To support this, Hoese assembled a large specimen collection, including osteological material and radiographs of about 70% of recognized genera.

In 1981, Hoese and John R. Paxton co-organized the first International Conference on Indo-Pacific Fishes (IPFC) at the Australian Museum. This highly successful conference series has continued every four years. In 2009, the first joint conference with the ASFB was held in Fremantle.

Hoese has co-authored the descriptions of 136 fish species. In 2010, with Helen K. Larson, he described Priolepis akihitoi, a goby named in honor of Emperor Akihito of Japan.

== Eponymous taxa ==
Thirteen species have been named in Hoese’s honor, including:

- Alabes hoesei (Springer & Fraser, 1976)
- Allomogurnda hoesei (Allen, 2003)
- Dermatopsis hoesei (Møller & Schwarzhans, 2006)
- Eviota hoesei (Gill & Jewett, 2004)
- Glossogobius hoesei (Allen & Boeseman, 1982)
- Istigobius hoesei (Murdy & McEachran, 1982)
- Koumansetta hoesei (Kovačić, Bogorodsky, Mal & Alpermann, 2018)
- Pseudogobius hoesei (Larson & Hammer, 2021)
- Schismatogobius hoesei (Keith, Lord & Larson, 2017)
- Silhouettea hoesei (Larson & Miller, 1986)
- Starksia hoesei (Rosenblatt & Taylor, 1971)
- Stenogobius hoesei (Watson, 1991)
- Trimma hoesei (Winterbottom, 1984)

== Species described by Douglass F. Hoese ==
- Aioliops (Rennis & Hoese, 1987)
- Aioliops brachypterus (Rennis & Hoese, 1987)
- Aioliops megastigma (Rennis & Hoese, 1987)
- Aioliops novaeguineae (Rennis & Hoese, 1987)
- Aioliops tetrophthalmus (Rennis & Hoese, 1987)
- Allomogurnda multicincta (Allen & Hoese, 2017)
- Amblyeleotris randalli (Hoese & Steene, 1978)
- Barbulifer mexicanus (Hoese & Larson, 1985)
- Bostrychus microphthalmus (Hoese & Kottelat, 2005)
- Calumia profunda (Larson & Hoese, 1980)
- Cryptocentrus altipinna (Hoese, 2019)
- Cryptocentrus tentaculatus (Hoese & Larson, 2004)
- Discordipinna (Hoese & Fourmanoir, 1978)
- Discordipinna griessingeri (Hoese & Fourmanoir, 1978)
- Egglestonichthys bombylios (Larson & Hoese, 1997)
- Eviota kermadecensis (Hoese & Stewart, 2012)
- Fusigobius duospilus (Hoese & Reader, 1985)
- Fusigobius signipinnis (Hoese & Obika, 1988)
- Glossogobius bellendenensis (Hoese & Allen, 2009)
- Glossogobius clitellus (Hoese & Allen, 2012)
- Glossogobius coatesi (Hoese & Allen, 1990)
- Glossogobius gnomus (Hoese, Allen & Hadiaty, 2017)
- Glossogobius illimis (Hoese & Allen, 2012)
- Glossogobius macrocephalus (Hoese & Allen, 2015)
- Glossogobius mahalonensis (Hoese, Hadiaty & Herder, 2015)
- Glossogobius multipapillus (Hoese & Allen, 2015)
- Glossogobius munroi (Hoese & Allen, 2012)
- Glossogobius muscorum (Hoese & Allen, 2009)
- Glossogobius nanus (Hoese, Allen & Hadiaty, 2017)
- Glossogobius pumilus (Hoese, Allen & Hadiaty, 2017)
- Glossogobius robertsi (Hoese & Allen, 2009)
- Glossogobius sentaniensis (Hoese & Allen, 2015)
- Glossogobius torrentis (Hoese & Allen, 1990)
- Gobulus birdsongi (Hoese & Reader, 2001)
- Hetereleotris apora (Hoese & Winterbottom, 1979)
- Hetereleotris margaretae (Hoese, 1986)
- Hetereleotris readerae (Hoese & Larson, 2005)
- Hetereleotris vinsoni (Hoese, 1986)
- Heteroclinus argyrospilos (Hoese & Pogonoski, 2021)
- Heteroclinus kuiteri (Hoese & Rennis, 2006)
- Heteroclinus macrophthalmus (Hoese, 1976)
- Hyporthodus perplexus (Randall, Hoese & Last, 1991)
- Hypseleotris ejuncida (Hoese & Allen, 1982)
- Hypseleotris kimberleyensis (Hoese & Allen, 1982)
- Hypseleotris regalis (Hoese & Allen, 1982)
- Istigobius murdyi (Hoese & Erdmann, 2018)
- Kimberleyeleotris (Hoese & Allen, 1987)
- Kimberleyeleotris hutchinsi (Hoese & Allen, 1987)
- Kimberleyeleotris notata (Hoese & Allen, 1987)
- Larsonella pumilus (Larson & Hoese, 1980)
- Mogurnda cingulata (Allen & Hoese, 1991)
- Mogurnda furva (Allen & Hoese, 1986)
- Mogurnda kutubuensis (Allen & Hoese, 1986)
- Mogurnda lineata (Allen & Hoese, 1991)
- Mogurnda orientalis (Allen & Hoese, 1991)
- Mogurnda spilota (Allen & Hoese, 1986)
- Mogurnda vitta (Allen & Hoese, 1986)
- Myersina lachneri (Hoese & Lubbock, 1982)
- Navigobius (Hoese & Motomura, 2009)
- Navigobius dewa (Hoese & Motomura, 2009)
- Nesogobius greeni (Hoese & Larson, 2006)
- Nesogobius maccullochi (Hoese & Larson, 2006)
- Nesogobius tigrinus (Hammer, Hoese & Bertozii, 2015)
- Odontobutidae (Hoese & Gill, 1993)
- Ophiogobius jenynsi (Hoese, 1976)
- Ostorhinchus limenus (Randall & Hoese, 1988)
- Paraplesiops alisonae (Hoese & Kuiter, 1984)
- Paratrimma (Hoese & Brothers, 1976)
- Paratrimma nigrimenta (Hoese & Brothers, 1976)
- Paratrimma urospila (Hoese & Brothers, 1976)
- Paraxenisthmus (Gill & Hoese, 1993)
- Paraxenisthmus springeri (Gill & Hoese, 1993)
- Parioglossus aporos (Rennis & Hoese, 1985)
- Parioglossus lineatus (Rennis & Hoese, 1985)
- Parioglossus marginalis (Rennis & Hoese, 1985)
- Parioglossus nudus (Rennis & Hoese, 1985)
- Parioglossus triquetrus (Rennis & Hoese, 1985)
- Parioglossus verticalis (Rennis & Hoese, 1985)
- Parma alboscapularis (Allen & Hoese, 1975)
- Parma occidentalis (Allen & Hoese, 1975)
- Pascua sticta (Hoese & Larson, 2005)
- Philypnodon macrostomus (Hoese & Reader, 2006)
- Plectranthias lasti (Randall & Hoese, 1995)
- Plectranthias pallidus (Randall & Hoese, 1995)
- Plectranthias robertsi (Randall & Hoese, 1995)
- Plectropomus marisrubri (Randall & Hoese, 1986)
- Porcellio anagae (Hoese, 1985)
- Porcellio gruneri (Hoese, 1978)
- Porcellio palmae (Hoese, 1985)
- Porcellio studienstiftius (Hoese, 1985)
- Priolepis akihitoi (Hoese & Larson, 2010)
- Priolepis cyanocephala (Hoese & Larson, 2010)
- Ptereleotris arabica (Randall & Hoese, 1985)
- Ptereleotris melanopogon (Randall & Hoese, 1985)
- Ptereleotris monoptera (Randall & Hoese, 1985)
- Ptereleotris uroditaenia (Randall & Hoese, 1985)
- Pterocerdale (Hoese & Motomura, 2009)
- Pterocerdale insolita (Hoese & Motomura, 2009)
- Signigobius (Hoese & Allen, 1977)
- Signigobius biocellatus (Hoese & Allen, 1977)
- Stonogobiops medon (Hoese & Randall, 1982)
- Stonogobiops nematodes (Hoese & Randall, 1982)
- Stonogobiops xanthorhinicus (Hoese & Randall, 1982)
- Sueviota (Winterbottom & Hoese, 1988)
- Sueviota aprica (Winterbottom & Hoese, 1988)
- Sueviota atrinasa (Winterbottom & Hoese, 1988)
- Sueviota lachneri (Winterbottom & Hoese, 1988)
- Sueviota larsonae (Winterbottom & Hoese, 1988)
- Tasmanogobius gloveri (Hoese, 1991)
- Tasmanogobius lasti (Hoese, 1991)
- Thalasseleotris (Hoese & Larson, 1987)
- Thalasseleotris adela (Hoese & Larson, 1987)
- Thalasseleotris iota (Hoese & Roberts, 2005)
- Tigrigobius limbaughi (Hoese & Reader, 2001)
- Tomiyamichthys levisquama (Hoese, Shibukawa & Johnson, 2016)
- Trimma insularum (Winterbottom & Hoese, 2015)
- Trimma kitrinum (Winterbottom & Hoese, 2015)
- Trimma maiandros (Hoese, Winterbottom & Reader, 2011)
- Trimma meristum (Winterbottom & Hoese, 2015)
- Trimma pentherum (Winterbottom & Hoese, 2015)
- Trimma quadrimaculatum (Hoese, Bogorodsky & Mal, 2015)
- Trimma readerae (Winterbottom & Hoese, 2015)
- Trimma xanthum (Winterbottom & Hoese, 2015)
- Tryssogobius (Larson & Hoese, 2001)
- Tryssogobius colini (Larson & Hoese, 2001)
- Tryssogobius longipes (Larson & Hoese, 2001)
- Valenciennea alleni (Hoese & Larson, 1994)
- Valenciennea bella (Hoese & Larson, 1994)
- Valenciennea decora (Hoese & Larson, 1994)
- Valenciennea limicola (Hoese & Larson, 1994)
- Valenciennea parva (Hoese & Larson, 1994)
- Valenciennea persica (Hoese & Larson, 1994)
- Valenciennea randalli (Hoese & Larson, 1994)
- Xenisthmus chi (Gill & Hoese, 2004)
- Xenisthmus eirospilus (Gill & Hoese, 2004)
- Xenisthmus semicinctus (Gill & Hoese, 2004)
