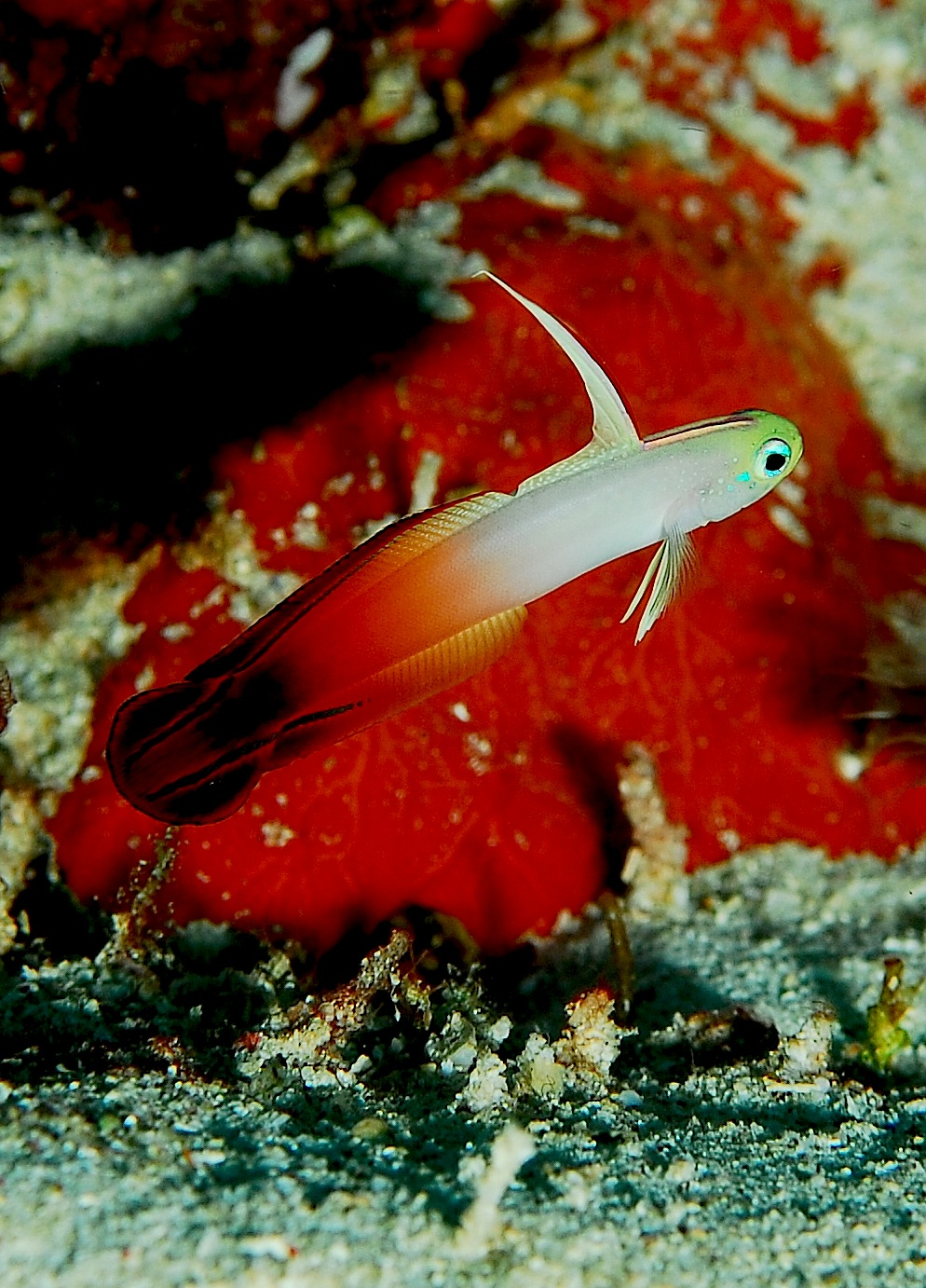
- Nemateleotris magnifica

Scientific classification
- Kingdom: Animalia
- Phylum: Chordata
- Class: Actinopterygii
- Order: Gobiiformes
- Suborder: Gobioidei
- Family: Microdesmidae; Regan, 1912

Subfamilies and genera
- Subfamily Ptereleotrinae: Aioliops; Navigobius; Nemateleotris; Oxymetopon; Parioglossus; Ptereleotris; Pterocerdale; Zagadkogobius; Subfamily Microdesminae: Cerdale; Clarkichthys; Gunnellichthys; Microdesmus; Paragunnellichthys

= Microdesmidae =

Family of fishes

The Microdesmidae, the wormfishes and dartfishes, were a family of goby-like fishes in the order Gobiiformes, more recent workers have placed this taxon within the Gobiidae, although the researchers do not define the taxonomic status of this grouping within that family. Two subfamilies in this family were briefly treated as full families - the Ptereleotrinae (dartfishes) and Microdesminae (wormfishes). The family includes about 82 species.

They are found in shallow tropical waters, both marine and brackish, often burrowing in estuarine mud. They are small fish, the largest species reaching only about 12 cm in length.
