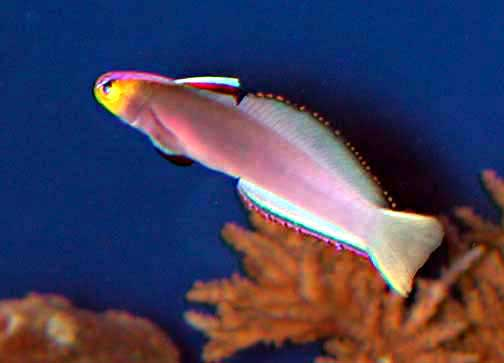

Conservation status
- Least Concern (IUCN 3.1)

Scientific classification
- Domain: Eukaryota
- Kingdom: Animalia
- Phylum: Chordata
- Class: Actinopterygii
- Order: Gobiiformes
- Family: Gobiidae
- Genus: Nemateleotris
- Species: N. helfrichi

Binomial name
- Nemateleotris helfrichi J. E. Randall & G. R. Allen, 1973

= Nemateleotris helfrichi =

Species of fish

Nemateleotris helfrichi, Helfrich's Dartfish, is a species of dartfish native to the Pacific Ocean.

== Description ==
They are small fishes that grow to a maximum length of 6 centimetres (2.4 in). They have bright yellow head with purple forehead with purple and white shades on body. They have 7 dorsal spines 28-31 dorsal soft rays and 1 anal spine 26-28 anal soft rays.

== Distribution and habitat ==
They are present in the Pacific Ocean between latitudes 16°N and 28°S. Their range extends from Indonesia to Tuamotu Archipelago. They prefer deeper waters than other Nemateleotris. They are found swimming a few meters above the water bed. They are found at a depths between and are rarely found above 40 metres (130 ft).

== Diet ==
They are carnivorous. N. helfrichi mainly feed on zooplanktons, amphipods, copepods, small crustaceans and shrimp larvae. They are said to lose their bright colour if their dietary requirements are not met.

== Behaviour ==
The species is monogamous and are usually found in pairs. They are territorial and will fight with conspecifics unless they are a pair. The species is shy and hides in small caves when threatened.

== In the aquarium ==
Due to their bright colour they are very popular as a marine aquarium fish. They are also more delicate and rare form than other more common firefish species (as evidenced by their price) and should be kept by marine-aquarists of intermediate expertise or higher.

== Name ==
The specific name honours Philip Helfrich, an Emeritus Director and Researcher, Hawaii Institute of Marine Biology (University of Hawaii), and the director of the Eniwetok Marine Biological Laboratory, who collected some of the first specimens of this species.
