= Ptereleotris arabica =

Scientific classification
- Kingdom: Animalia
- Phylum: Chordata
- Class: Actinopterygii
- Order: Gobiiformes
- Family: Gobiidae
- Genus: Ptereleotris
- Species: P. arabica

Binomial name
- Ptereleotris arabica Randall & Hoese, 1985

Species of fish

Ptereleotris arabica is a species of dartfish in the family Microdesmidae.
