= Ptereleotris brachyptera =

Scientific classification
- Kingdom: Animalia
- Phylum: Chordata
- Class: Actinopterygii
- Order: Gobiiformes
- Family: Gobiidae
- Genus: Ptereleotris
- Species: P. brachyptera

Binomial name
- Ptereleotris brachyptera Randall & Suzuki, 2008

Species of fish

Ptereleotris brachyptera is a species of dartfish in the family Microdesmidae.
