= Nemateleotris exquisita =

Scientific classification
- Domain: Eukaryota
- Kingdom: Animalia
- Phylum: Chordata
- Class: Actinopterygii
- Order: Gobiiformes
- Family: Gobiidae
- Genus: Nemateleotris
- Species: N. exquisita

Binomial name
- Nemateleotris exquisita J. E. Randall & Connell, 2013

Species of fish

Nemateleotris exquisita is a species of dartfish which was described in 2013 from specimens collected in the Red Sea, off Mauritius and Kwa-Zulu Natal, South Africa. Formerly, the elegant firefish (Nemateleotris decora) was thought to be found in the western Indian Ocean but N. exquisita was found to be larger, with a more slender body and longer snout, as well as the having a shorter first spine on the first dorsal fin. They also differ in colour with this species being yellow in the anterior part of the body and this colour extends further towards the tail than the analogous coloured area on N. decora. A hybrid N. decora x esquisita is thought to have been photographed in the Maldives in 1988, while the IUCN states that further taxonomic research is required to ascertain the validity of N. exquisita.
