= Parioglossus galzini =

Scientific classification
- Kingdom: Animalia
- Phylum: Chordata
- Class: Actinopterygii
- Order: Gobiiformes
- Family: Gobiidae
- Genus: Parioglossus
- Species: P. galzini

Binomial name
- Parioglossus galzini J. T. Williams & Lecchini, 2004

Species of fish

Parioglossus galzini is a species of dartfish presently known only from the island of Rapa Iti, French Polynesia.

This tiny fish (up to 2.3 centimetres (0.91 in) SL) is found on substrates of mud and rubble in shallow inshore waters of less than 1.5 metres (4.9 ft) in depth. It can be distinguished from its congeners in several ways, most notably by the complete absence of a dark lateral stripe and the presence of a membrane linking the two dorsal fins in both sexes.
