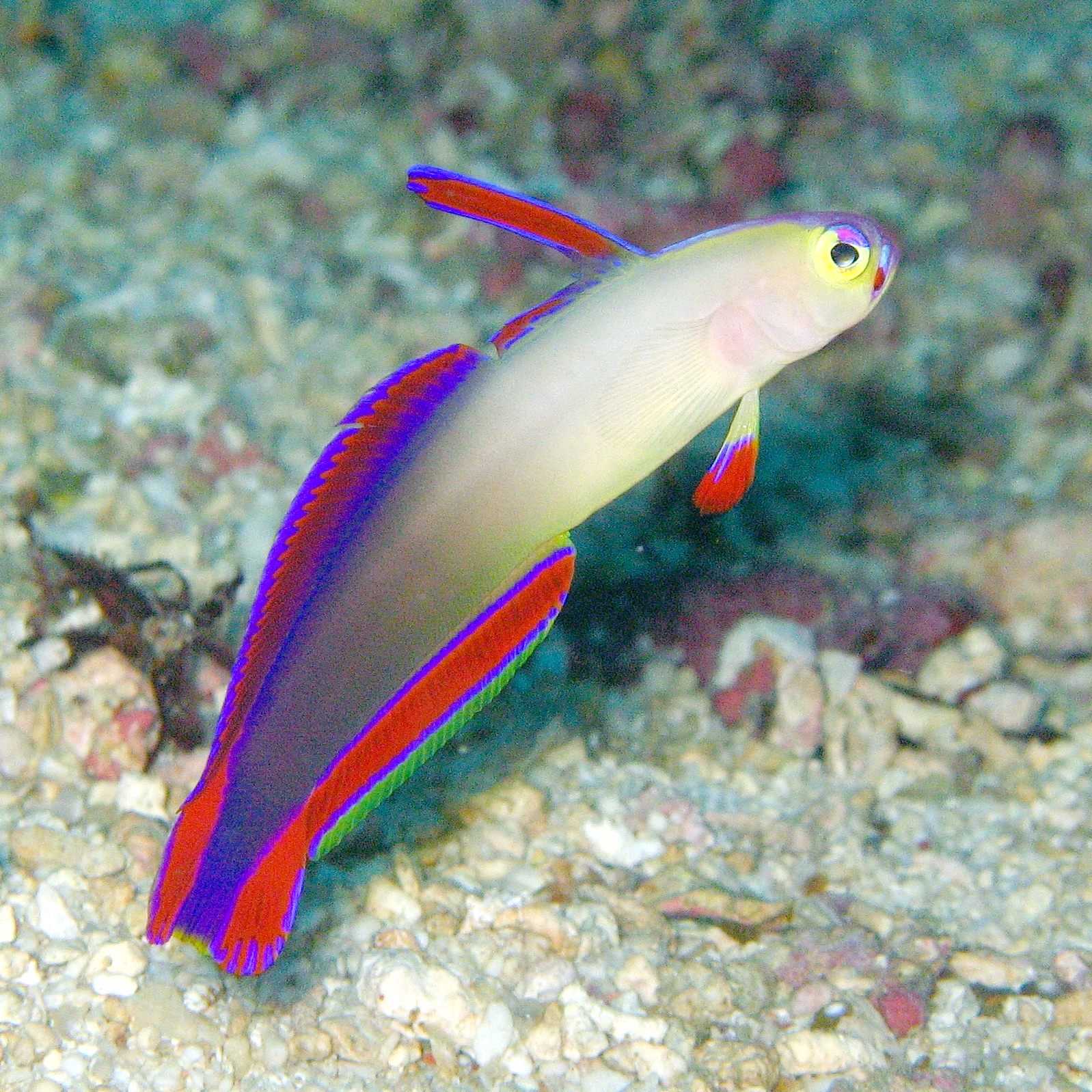

Conservation status
- Least Concern (IUCN 3.1)

Scientific classification
- Domain: Eukaryota
- Kingdom: Animalia
- Phylum: Chordata
- Class: Actinopterygii
- Order: Gobiiformes
- Family: Gobiidae
- Genus: Nemateleotris
- Species: N. decora

Binomial name
- Nemateleotris decora J. E. Randall & G. R. Allen, 1973

= Elegant firefish =

Species of fish

Nemateleotris decora, the elegant firefish or purple firefish, is a species of dartfish native to tropical waters in the Indo-West Pacific, from Mauritius to Samoa, north to Ryukyu Islands, and south to New Caledonia, from depths ranging between 25 and 70 m (82 and 230 ft). It is found over hard, open bottoms of reefs, sandy patches and rubble, as well as deeper coastal outer reef drop-offs where there are strong currents. It reaches a maximum length of 9 cm (3 in). This species is often found in pairs and is monogamous. They feed on zooplankton, especially the larvae of copepods and crustaceans. They will dart into holes when alarmed. The populations of this species from the western Indian Ocean have been recognised by some workers as a distinct species, Nemateleotris exquisita, however, the validity of this taxon needs more taxonomic research.

== Description ==
The elegant firefish is a slender, colourful fish. The dorsal fin has 7 spines and 27 to 32 soft rays while the anal fin has a single spine and 28 to 31 soft rays. The head is purple and the body colour is whitish or yellowish, gradually darkening to deep grey towards the tail. The fins have longitudinal bands of purple, red, black and orange.

== In the aquarium ==
This fish is popular in reef aquariums and is resistant to diseases. These fish are relatively docile and will not attack tankmates where kept in a suitably sized aquarium; however, if kept in confined quarters these fish may squabble over territory. Firefish are commonly kept in nano reef aquariums.

Firefish are prolific leapers. Thus, require aquarium hoods that will not easily allow the firefish to leap from the tank and expire. These fish should also be provided with rockwork to hide in.

This and other species of firefish are occasionally spawned in captivity.
