= Nemateleotris lavandula =

Scientific classification
- Kingdom: Animalia
- Phylum: Chordata
- Class: Actinopterygii
- Order: Gobiiformes
- Family: Gobiidae
- Genus: Nemateleotris
- Species: N. lavandula

Binomial name
- Nemateleotris lavandula Tea & Helen K. Larson, 2023

Newly discovered species of fish

Nemateleotris lavandula, known by lavender-blushed dartfish, is a species of dartfish which was described in 2023 on the basis of the holotype from Augulupelu Reef, Palau, and twelve paratypes from across the western and central Pacific Ocean, including Fiji, Guam, Japan, and the Marshall Islands. It was previously confused with the Helfrich's dartfish (Nemateleotris helfrichi).

== Description ==
Members of this species measures 5 cm in length has a lavender to lilac body, becoming increasingly pale toward caudal peduncle.

== Distribution ==
Its distribution follows the northwestern contours of the Pacific Plate, from Yakushima Island in southern Japan, throughout the Ryukyu and the Ogasawara Islands, and south to Taiwan and the northern Philippines, extending east across Micronesia, including the Caroline Islands, the Marshall Islands, and the Mariana Islands.
