= Aioliops brachypterus =

Conservation status
- Vulnerable (IUCN 3.1)

Scientific classification
- Kingdom: Animalia
- Phylum: Chordata
- Class: Actinopterygii
- Order: Gobiiformes
- Family: Gobiidae
- Genus: Aioliops
- Species: A. brachypterus

Binomial name
- Aioliops brachypterus Rennis & Hoese, 1987

Species of fish from the Philippines

Aioliops brachypterus, commonly known as the shortfin minidartfish, is a species of dartfish endemic to the lagoons of Miniloc Island, El Nido, Philippines. It is a small fish measuring around 17 to 24 mm (0.67 to 0.94 in) in length. It has a grayish to pink body with a bright yellow stripe on the side and a dark spot on the tail fin. They swim in schools of up to 50 individuals.

== Taxonomy ==
Aioliops brachypterus was first described by Denise S. Rennis and Douglass F Hoese in 1987. The type specimens were collected from Miniloc Island in El Nido, Palawan, Philippines in 1984. It belongs to the genus Aioliops in the family Gobiidae (gobies). The specific epithet is derived from Greek brachy- ("short") and pteron ("fin"), in reference to the relatively short dorsal, caudal, and pelvic fins.

== Distribution and habitat ==
Aioliops brachypterus is endemic to lagoons in Miniloc Island in the Philippines. They occur to a depth of around 3 to 10 m (9.8 to 32.8 ft) in groups of up to 50 individuals. It is currently assessed as Vulnerable by the IUCN Red List.

== Description ==
Aioliops brachypterus is a small fish, averaging at 17 to 20 mm (0.67 to 0.79 in) in length, with a maximum length of 24 mm (0.94 in). It can be distinguished from other members of the genus in that its body has no scales. It has a rounded snout and short fins (in comparison to other Aioliops species, hence its name). The body is colored gray to pinkish with a bright yellow strip in the middle of the body from the snout to the beginning of the tail fin. The fins are bluish in color. The tail fin has a large dark spot at the base. Males and females have similar coloration but males are distinguished by having a darker head and back part and a wider yellow stripe; while in females the yellow stripe is thinner extends into the head beyond the gill openings. The pelvic fins are also longer in males.
