= Parioglossus palustris =

Scientific classification
- Kingdom: Animalia
- Phylum: Chordata
- Class: Actinopterygii
- Order: Gobiiformes
- Family: Gobiidae
- Genus: Parioglossus
- Species: P. palustris

Binomial name
- Parioglossus palustris Herre, 1945

Species of fish

Parioglossus palustris, the Borneo hoverer goby, is a species of dartfish native to the Andaman Sea and West Pacific.

This fish is usually found near mangrove trees.
