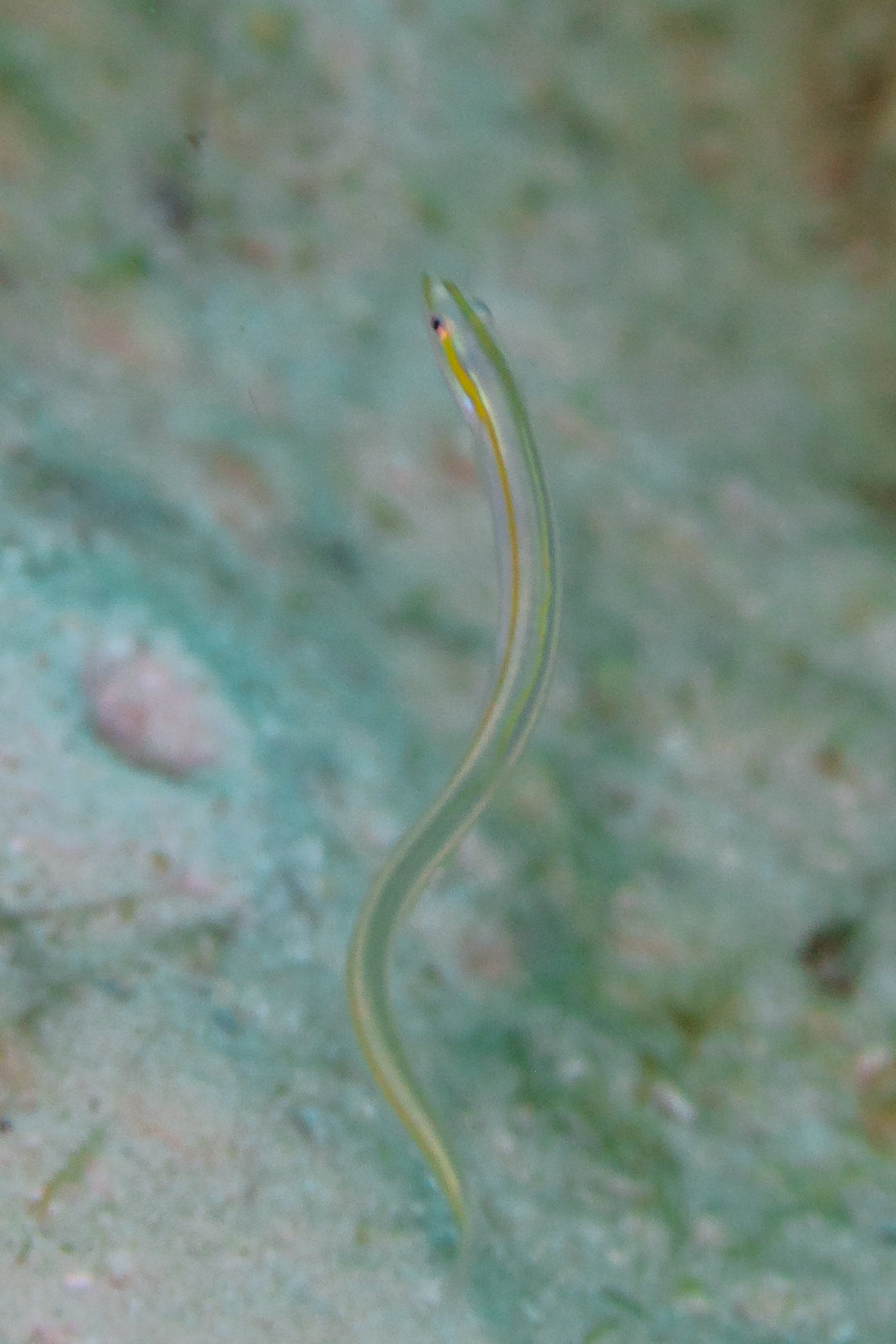

Conservation status
- Least Concern (IUCN 3.1)

Scientific classification
- Kingdom: Animalia
- Phylum: Chordata
- Class: Actinopterygii
- Division: Teleostei
- Order: Gobiiformes
- Family: Gobiidae
- Genus: Gunnellichthys
- Species: G. curiosus

Binomial name
- Gunnellichthys curiosus C. E. Dawson, 1968

Synonyms
- Gunnelichthys curiosus Dawson, 1968; Gunnelichtys curiosus Dawson, 1968

= Gunnellichthys curiosus =

Species of ray-finned fish

Gunnellichthys curiosus, the curious wormfish, is a species of wormfish native to the Indian Ocean from the Seychelles and Mauritius to the Hawaiian Islands in the central Pacific Ocean. It is an inhabitant of reefs and can be found at depths of from 9 to 60 m (30 to 197 ft). It occurs in areas with substrates that allow it to conceal itself in burrows. It reaches a length of 12 cm (4.7 in) SL. This fish can also be found in the aquarium trade.
