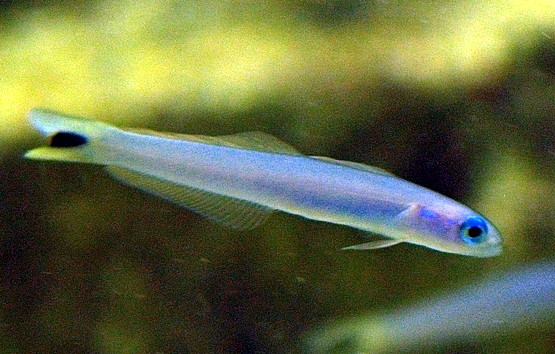

Conservation status
- Least Concern (IUCN 3.1)

Scientific classification
- Kingdom: Animalia
- Phylum: Chordata
- Class: Actinopterygii
- Division: Teleostei
- Order: Gobiiformes
- Family: Gobiidae
- Genus: Ptereleotris
- Species: P. heteroptera

Binomial name
- Ptereleotris heteroptera (Bleeker, 1855)

Synonyms
- Eleotris heteropterus Bleeker, 1855

= Ptereleotris heteroptera =

Species of ray-finned fish

Ptereleotris heteroptera is a species of fish in the family Microdesmidae.
