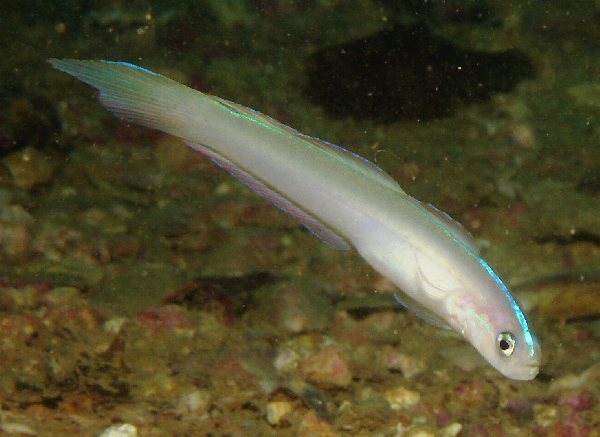

Scientific classification
- Domain: Eukaryota
- Kingdom: Animalia
- Phylum: Chordata
- Class: Actinopterygii
- Order: Gobiiformes
- Family: Gobiidae
- Genus: Ptereleotris
- Species: P. randalli

Binomial name
- Ptereleotris randalli Gasparini, Rocha & Floeter, 2001

= Ptereleotris randalli =

Species of fish

Ptereleotris randalli, the Brazilian dartfish, is a fish belonging to the family Gobiidae and subfamily Ptereleotrinae. Like other dartfishes, it lives over sand and rubble bottoms, and quickly retreats into holes when approached. It was originally thought to be restricted to Brazil, south to Santa Catarina, but recently reported for the southern Caribbean, where it's found at depths of 8-60m.
