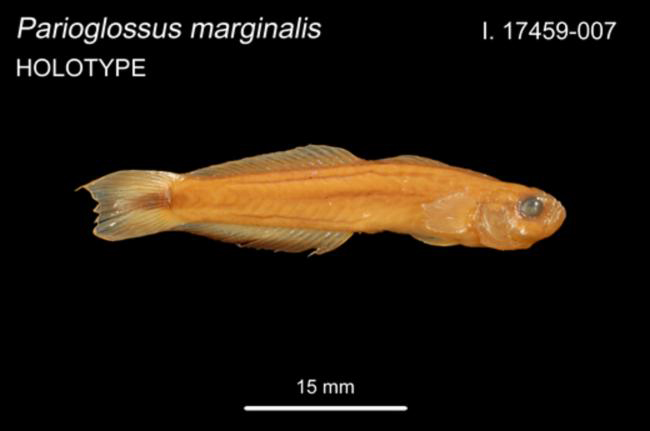

Conservation status
- Least Concern (IUCN 3.1)

Scientific classification
- Kingdom: Animalia
- Phylum: Chordata
- Class: Actinopterygii
- Division: Teleostei
- Order: Gobiiformes
- Family: Gobiidae
- Genus: Parioglossus
- Species: P. marginalis

Binomial name
- Parioglossus marginalis Rennis & Hoese, 1985

= Parioglossus marginalis =

Species of fish

Parioglossus marginalis, also known as the blackmargin dartfish, is a species of dartfish native to the brackish waters of the coast of New South Wales, Australia and around the northern part of the North Island and Great Barrier Island in New Zealand, This may be an introduced species in New Zealand, being brought from Australia in ship's ballast water. The species can reach a length of 3.3 centimetres (1.3 in) SL. It is thought by some workers that Parioglossus neoclaedonicus from New Caledonia may be a synonym of P. marginalis and that the Caroline Islands species Parioglossus verticalis, which is known form just a single specimen, may also be synonymous with this species. To resolve these taxonomic uncertainties molecular studies will be required.
