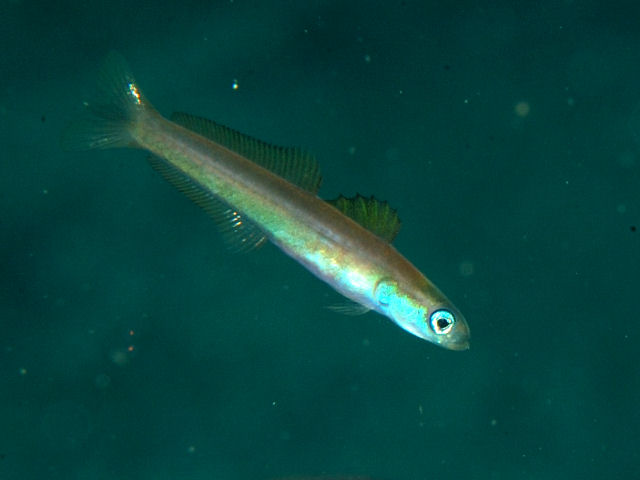

Scientific classification
- Kingdom: Animalia
- Phylum: Chordata
- Class: Actinopterygii
- Order: Gobiiformes
- Family: Gobiidae
- Genus: Ptereleotris
- Species: P. hanae

Binomial name
- Ptereleotris hanae (D. S. Jordan & Snyder, 1901)

Synonyms
- Vireosa hanae D. S. Jordan & Snyder, 1901

= Ptereleotris hanae =

Species of fish

Ptereleotris hanae, commonly known as the blue gudgeon dartfish or blue hana goby, is a species of dartfish native to the western Pacific Ocean. It is a reef inhabitant, being found at depths of from 3 to 50 metres (9.8 to 164.0 ft), though usually no shallower than 6 metres (20 ft). It inhabits burrows made by alpheid shrimp, but unlike the Amblyeleotris gobies who normally associate with these shrimp, this species has no interactions with their shrimp hosts. This species can reach a length of 12 centimetres (4.7 in) TL. It can also be found in the aquarium trade.
