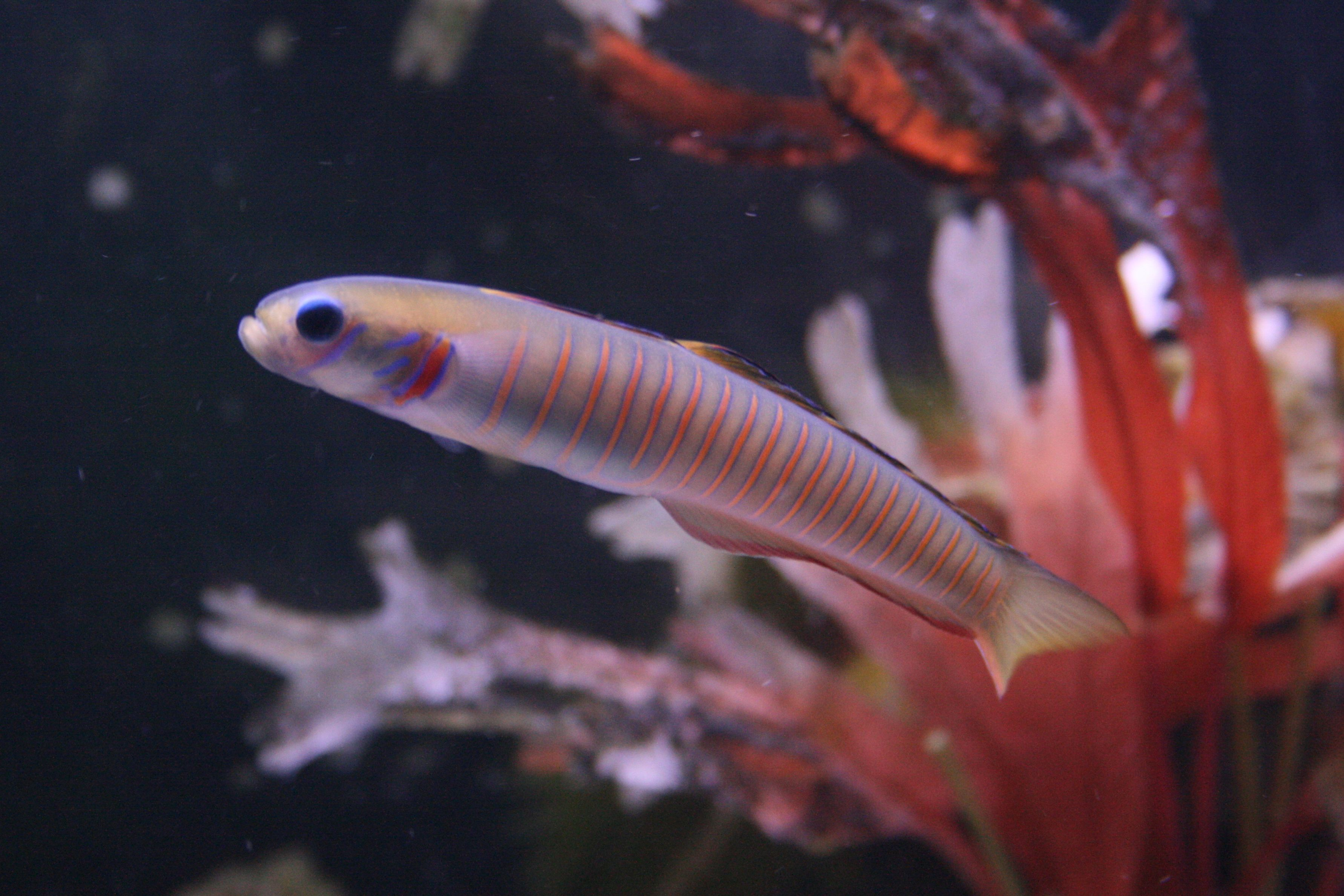

Conservation status
- Least Concern (IUCN 3.1)

Scientific classification
- Kingdom: Animalia
- Phylum: Chordata
- Class: Actinopterygii
- Order: Gobiiformes
- Family: Gobiidae
- Genus: Ptereleotris
- Species: P. zebra

Binomial name
- Ptereleotris zebra (Fowler, 1938)

Synonyms
- Pogonoculius zebra Fowler, 1938

= Ptereleotris zebra =

Species of fish

Ptereleotris zebra, the Zebra barred dartfish or Chinese zebra goby, is a species of dartfish native to the Indian Ocean and the western Pacific Ocean. An inhabitant of reefs, it can be found in schools at depths of 2–31 m (6.6–101.7 ft), though usually it does not venture deeper than 4 m (13 ft). This species can reach 12 cm (4.7 in) SL, and may be found in the aquarium trade.
