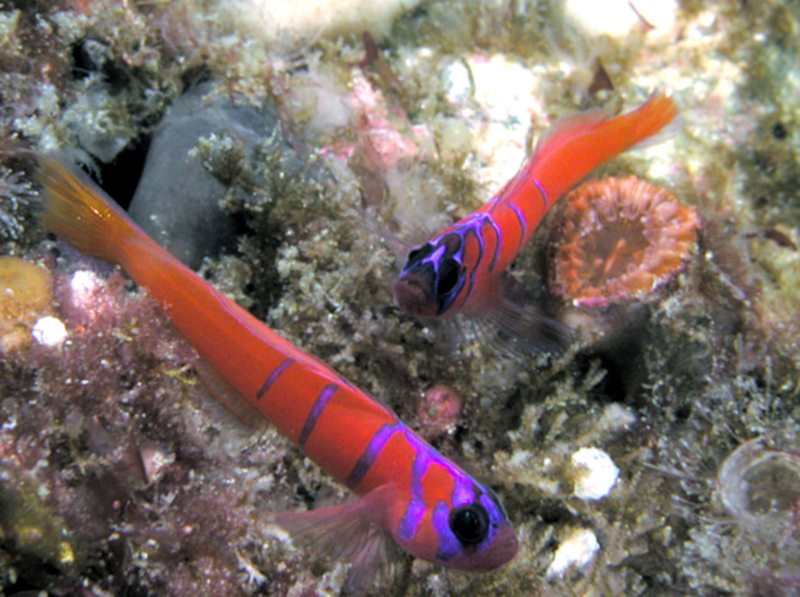
- Bluebanded Gobies Lythrypnus dalli, San Clemente Island, Channel Islands, California.

Scientific classification
- Kingdom: Animalia
- Phylum: Chordata
- Class: Actinopterygii
- Order: Gobiiformes
- Family: Gobiidae
- Genus: Lythrypnus; D. S. Jordan & Evermann, 1896

Type species
- Gobius dalli C. H. Gilbert 1890

= Lythrypnus =

Genus of fishes

Lythrypnus is a genus of gobies native to the Atlantic and Pacific coasts of the Americas including Cocos Island and the Galapagos Islands. Lythrypnus is a hermaphroditic fish that is able to change sex. Depending on its size and shape, Lythrypnus Dalli is able to have both male and female reproductive function.

== Species ==
There are currently 20 recognized species in this genus:

- Lythrypnus alphigena W. A. Bussing, 1990
- Lythrypnus brasiliensis D. W. Greenfield, 1988
- Lythrypnus cobalus W. A. Bussing, 1990
- Lythrypnus crocodilus (Beebe & Tee-Van, 1928) (Mahogany goby)
- Lythrypnus dalli (C. H. Gilbert, 1890) (Bluebanded goby)
- Lythrypnus elasson J. E. Böhlke & C. R. Robins, 1960 (Dwarf goby)
- Lythrypnus gilberti (Heller & Snodgrass, 1903) (Galapagos blue-banded goby)
- Lythrypnus heterochroma Ginsburg, 1939 (Diphasic goby)
- Lythrypnus insularis W. A. Bussing, 1990 (Distant goby)
- Lythrypnus lavenbergi W. A. Bussing, 1990
- Lythrypnus minimus Garzón & Acero P., 1988 (Pygmy goby)
- Lythrypnus mowbrayi (T. H. Bean, 1906)
- Lythrypnus nesiotes J. E. Böhlke & C. R. Robins, 1960 (Island goby)
- Lythrypnus okapia C. R. Robins & J. E. Böhlke, 1964 (Okapi goby)
- Lythrypnus phorellus J. E. Böhlke & C. R. Robins, 1960 (Convict goby)
- Lythrypnus pulchellus Ginsburg, 1938 (Gorgeous goby)
- Lythrypnus rhizophora (Heller & Snodgrass, 1903) (Spotcheek goby)
- Lythrypnus solanensis Acero P., 1981
- Lythrypnus spilus J. E. Böhlke & C. R. Robins, 1960 (Bluegold goby)
- Lythrypnus zebra (C. H. Gilbert, 1890) (Zebra goby)
