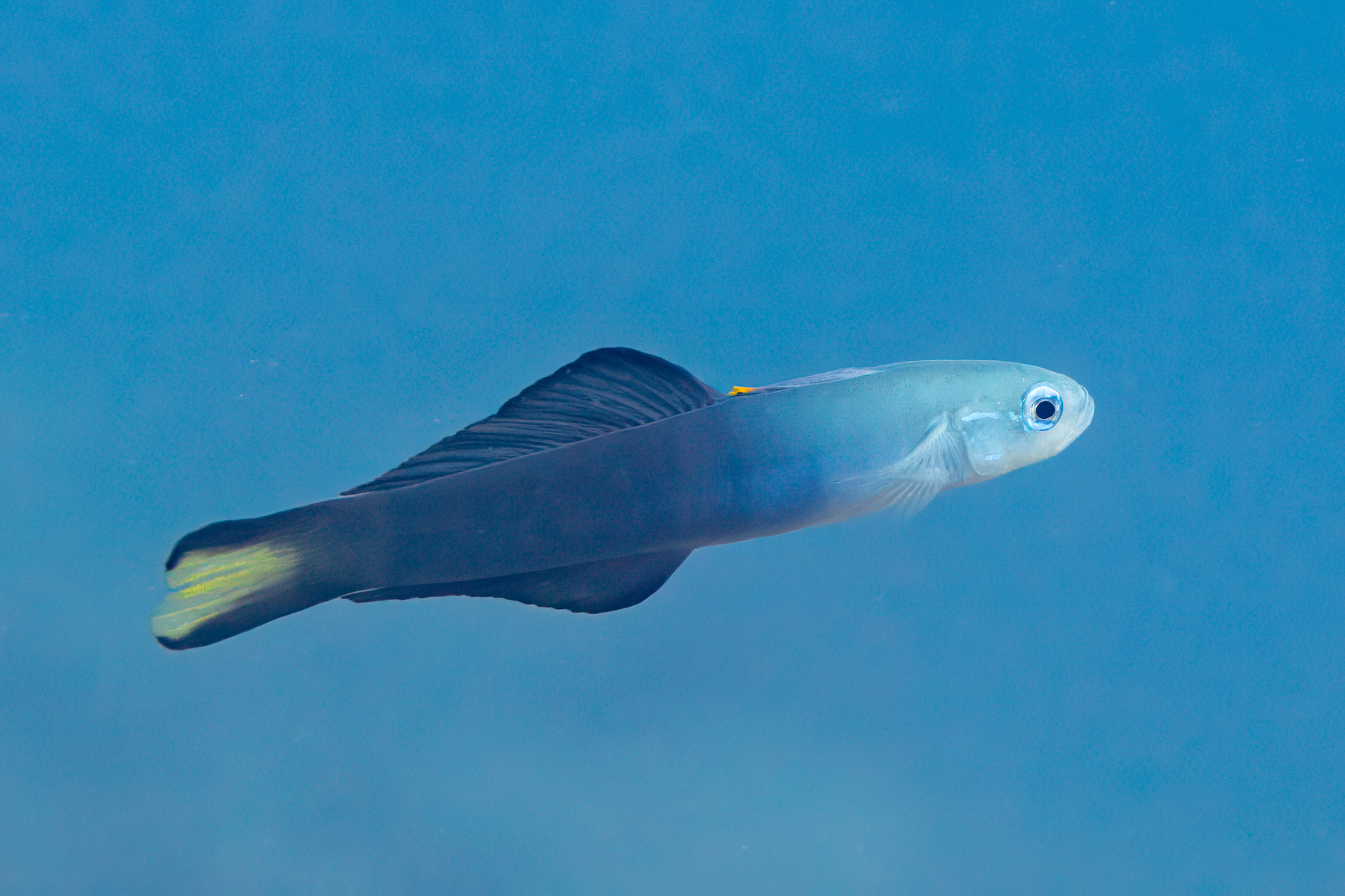

Conservation status
- Least Concern (IUCN 3.1)

Scientific classification
- Kingdom: Animalia
- Phylum: Chordata
- Class: Actinopterygii
- Order: Gobiiformes
- Family: Gobiidae
- Genus: Ptereleotris
- Species: P. evides

Binomial name
- Ptereleotris evides (Jordan & Hubbs, 1925)

Synonyms
- Encaeura evides Jordan & Hubbs, 1925; Ptereleotris dispersus Herre, 1927; Vireosa sakurai Schmidt, 1931; Ptereleotris microlepis sakurai (Schmidt, 1931); Ptereleotris tricolor Smith, 1957

= Ptereleotris evides =

Species of fish

Ptereleotris evides, the blackfin dartfish or scissortail goby, is a species of dartfish native to the Indian Ocean and the western Pacific Ocean. It is a reef inhabitant and can be found at depths of 2–15 m (6.6–49.2 ft). This species can reach 14 cm (5.5 in) TL and may be found in the aquarium trade.
