= Flagtail wormfish =

Conservation status
- Least Concern (IUCN 3.1)

Scientific classification
- Kingdom: Animalia
- Phylum: Chordata
- Class: Actinopterygii
- Order: Gobiiformes
- Family: Gobiidae
- Genus: Clarkichthys; J. L. B. Smith, 1958
- Species: C. bilineatus

Binomial name
- Clarkichthys bilineatus (H. W. Clark, 1936)

Synonyms
- Cerdale bilineatus H. W. Clark, 1936

Species of fish

The flagtail wormfish (Clarkichthys bilineatus) is a species of wormfish native to the Pacific coast of the Americas from Mexico to Colombia as well as the Galápagos Islands. It is an inhabitant of tide pools and reefs being found down to a depth of about 8 metres (26 ft). This species grows to a length of 6.2 centimetres (2.4 in) SL. This species is the only known member of the genus Clarkichthys. The generic name is a compound noun made up of the surname Clark, to honour the American ichthyologist H. Walton Clark (1870–1941) who described the species and ichthys the Greek for "fish".
