= Paragunnellichthys =

Scientific classification
- Kingdom: Animalia
- Phylum: Chordata
- Class: Actinopterygii
- Division: Teleostei
- Order: Gobiiformes
- Family: Gobiidae
- Genus: Paragunnellichthys; C. E. Dawson, 1967

Type species
- Paragunnellichthys seychellensis C. E. Dawson, 1967

Genus of fishes

Paragunnellichthys is a genus of wormfishes native to the Indian Ocean and the western Pacific Ocean.

== Species ==
There are currently two recognized species in this genus on Fishbase with a third recognised by other authorities:

- Paragunnellichthys fehlmanni C.E. Dawson, 1969
- Paragunnellichthys seychellensis C.E. Dawson, 1969 (Seychelles wormfish)
- Paragunnellichthys springeri C.E. Dawson, 1969
