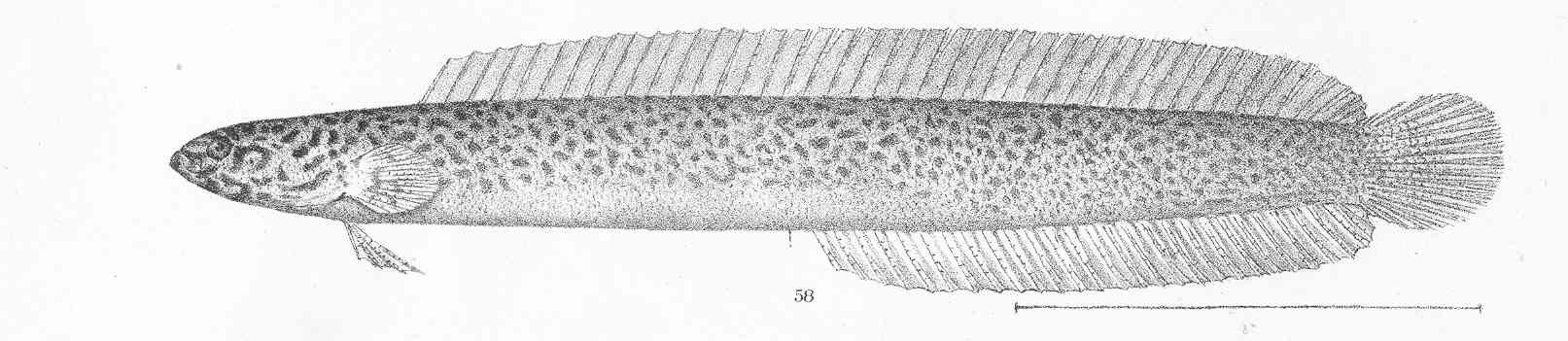
- Cerdale ionthas

Scientific classification
- Domain: Eukaryota
- Kingdom: Animalia
- Phylum: Chordata
- Class: Actinopterygii
- Order: Gobiiformes
- Family: Gobiidae
- Subfamily: Microdesminae
- Genus: Cerdale; D. S. Jordan & C. H. Gilbert, 1882

Type species
- Cerdale ionthas D. S. Jordan & C. H. Gilbert, 1882

= Cerdale =

Genus of fishes

Cerdale is a genus of wormfishes native to the western Atlantic Ocean and the eastern Pacific Ocean.

== Species ==
There are currently five recognized species in this genus:

- Cerdale fasciata C. E. Dawson, 1974
- Cerdale floridana Longley, 1934 (Pugjaw wormfish)
- Cerdale ionthas D. S. Jordan & C. H. Gilbert, 1882 (Spotted worm goby)
- Cerdale paludicola C. E. Dawson, 1974
- Cerdale prolata C. E. Dawson, 1974
