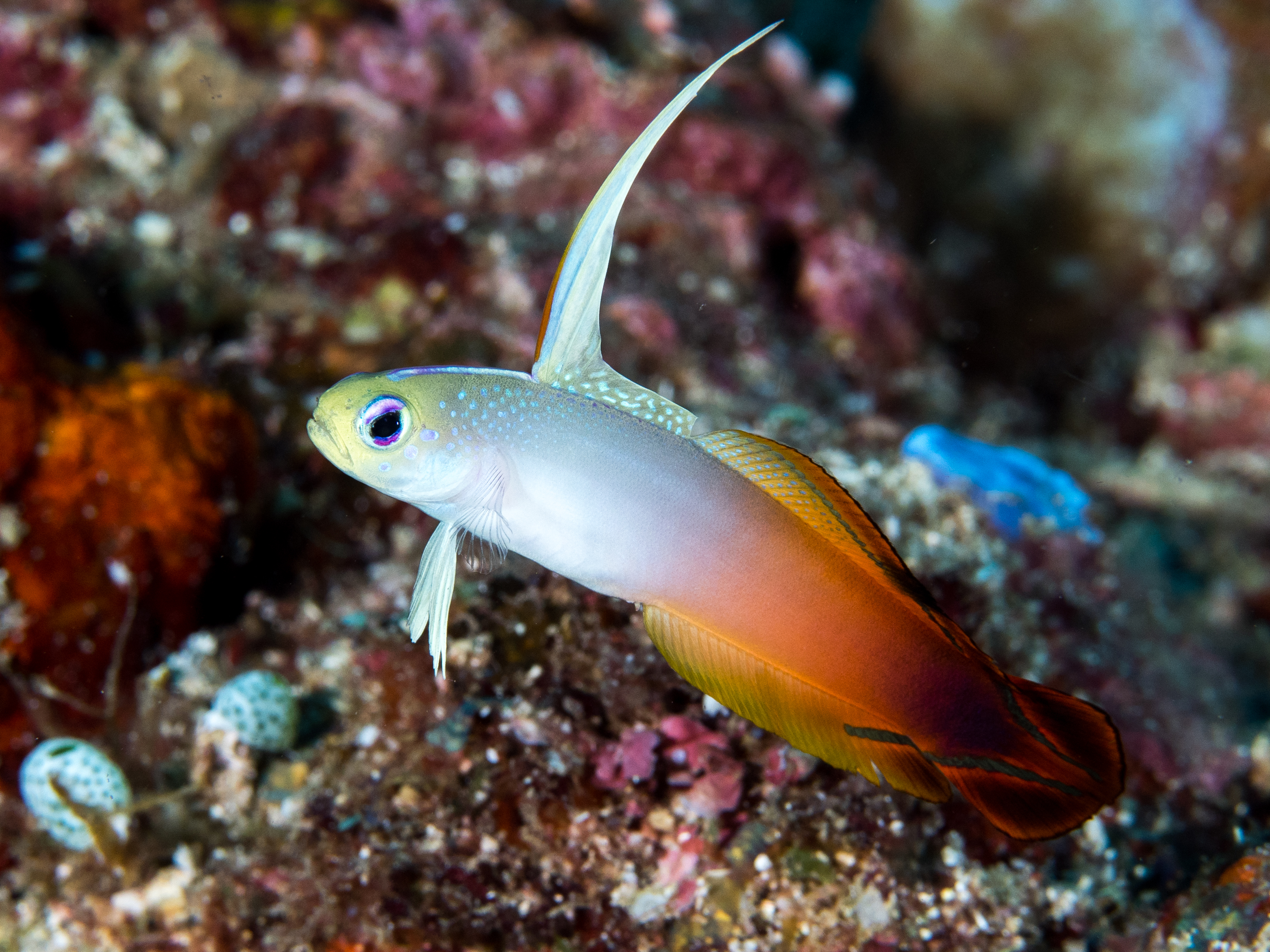

Conservation status
- Least Concern (IUCN 3.1)

Scientific classification
- Kingdom: Animalia
- Phylum: Chordata
- Class: Actinopterygii
- Order: Gobiiformes
- Family: Gobiidae
- Genus: Nemateleotris
- Species: N. magnifica

Binomial name
- Nemateleotris magnifica Fowler, 1938

= Nemateleotris magnifica =

Species of fish

Nemateleotris magnifica, known by a variety of common names including fire goby, magnificent fire fish, fire dartfish, or red fire goby, is a species of dartfish native to coral reefs of the Indian and Pacific oceans.

== Description ==
Members of this species usually have a bright yellow head, merging into a white body, gradually shading into a red-orange tail. Their dorsal fins are very long, and the fish flicks it back and forth. This is used as a signal to conspecifics. As a full grown adult, it reaches a maximum length of 9 centimetres (3.5 in).

== Distribution ==
Nemateleotris magnifica inhabits parts of the Indian and Pacific oceans. Specifically, it occurs as far west as the East African coast, in the Indian Ocean, to as far east as the Hawaiian Islands of the Pacific Ocean. Within the Pacific Ocean it occurs as far south as the Austral Islands, French Polynesia, to as far north as the Ryukyu Islands, Japan.

== Behaviour ==
It is an inhabitant of coral reefs where it can be found at depths of 6 to 70 metres (20 to 230 ft). It is usually found just above the bottom, facing into the current, where it awaits its prey of small invertebrates. Adults occupy sandy burrows alone or in pairs, while the juveniles live in small groups. These fish are monogamous and they will retreat to burrows if threatened.

== Care ==
Nemateleotris magnifica feeds on brine shrimp, mysis shrimp, and sometimes zooplankton growing in aquaria. They should be fed two times per day. They are considered reef-safe and they are peaceful and sociable. They can be found at many online and local fish or pet stores; they are suitable for novice marine fishkeepers, although an appropriate tank is required as they sometimes jump from the water. They will also form schools if many are put into the same tank.
