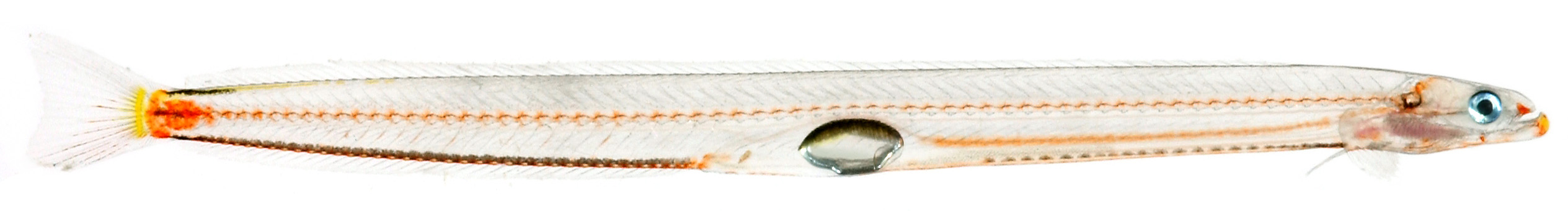
- Microdesmus carri, Larval (Wormfish).jpg

Scientific classification
- Kingdom: Animalia
- Phylum: Chordata
- Class: Actinopterygii
- Order: Gobiiformes
- Family: Gobiidae
- Subfamily: Microdesminae

Genera
- Cerdale; Clarkichthys; Gunnellichthys; Microdesmus; Paragunnellichthys

= Wormfish =

Wormfishes

Subfamily of small, slender fishes

Wormfishes were a subfamily, Microdesminae, which are formerly classified in the family Microdesmidae and are also currently classified, with no intervening rank, in the family Gobiidae and the order Gobiiformes.

They are found in shallow tropical waters, both marine and brackish, often burrowing in estuarine mud. They are small fishes, the largest species reaching only about 12 cm in length.
