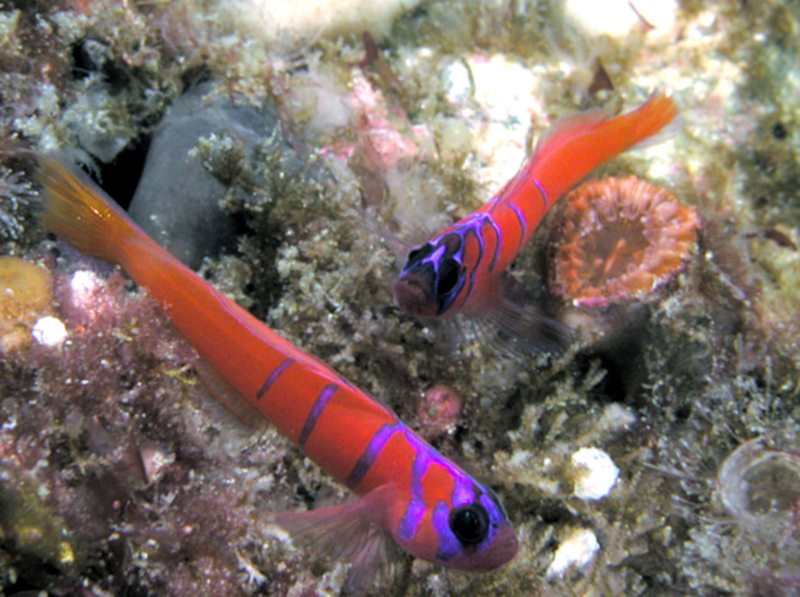

Conservation status
- Least Concern (IUCN 3.1)

Scientific classification
- Kingdom: Animalia
- Phylum: Chordata
- Class: Actinopterygii
- Order: Gobiiformes
- Family: Gobiidae
- Genus: Lythrypnus
- Species: L. dalli

Binomial name
- Lythrypnus dalli (C. H. Gilbert, 1890)

Synonyms
- Gobius dalli C. H. Gilbert, 1890; Microgobius cinctus Nichols, 1952

= Lythrypnus dalli =

Species of fish

The blue-banded goby (Lythrypnus dalli) is a member of the Gobiidae family, found abundantly in rocky reefs of the Pacific Ocean, ranging from Morro Bay, California to the Galápagos Islands, Ecuador.

== Description ==
Blue-banded goby reach a maximum adult size of around 64mm (roughly 2.5 inches), with standard ranges varying from 18-45mm (0.7-1.8 in). They are brightly colored coral-red, with 5-9 blue bands present towards the front of their bodies. They have two dorsal fins, with a tall, spiny fin placed towards the head, and a longer soft-rayed fin extending down the back. Like the round goby, they have a wide pelvic fin on either side of their body, which they use as a suction cup to cling to rocks in fast-moving currents.

As a defense mechanism, lythrypnus dalli secrete a mild toxin, making them irritating to eat. Other species of goby mimic their coloration and pattern to utilize this protection.

== Habitat ==
Lythrypnus dalli is commonly found in rocky reef environments, preferring hard substrates and sloped surfaces for their dwelling. Often found in open rocky areas and caves close to the ocean floor, they live at depths of around 0-76m (0-250 feet) below sea level. When approached or threatened, they often retreat into small crevices, sometimes taking refuge within the spines of Sea urchin.

== Diet ==
Being so small, the blue-banded goby feeds mainly on small creatures like zooplankton and miniature crustaceans. In some cases, they serve as cleaner fish, eating ectoparasites from other organisms. Their feeding behavior consists of swimming a short distance away from their reef and grabbing items to quickly take back into the reef, which includes amphipods and small crabs.

== Reproduction ==
The blue-banded goby exhibits a controlled reproductive system using bidirectional sex change. They can function as either a female or a male, depending on the social environment. Blue-banded gobies typically form harems consisting of one male and multiple females, where elimination of males due to predation or absence of males results in the largest female goby switching sex to assume the male role. Courtship behavior involves a male rushing at a female and nipping their genital area and locking jaws. Eggs are found along the walls of the brood chamber until a shell is found for the eggs to be deposited into. Males assume a strict task of guarding nests, using fanning motions of their pectoral fins to help develop eggs while warding off intruders. Breeding season starts around February and ends by about September. Blue-banded goby eggs can be expected to hatch in 4 days when temperatures are around 21°C, and then mature after 3 months.

== Life cycle ==
Blue-banded goby embryos typically hatch within 4-10 days, depending on the temperature the embryos are in. The embryo begins to develop a distinct head bulge and tail bud by the 6-somite stage. During the pharyngula period, bits of pigmentation can be observed along the embryo as well as muscle movement and a heartbeat by the 9-14 prim stage. The hatching period follows this period and is identifiable when pectoral fin buds and jaws begin growing. Caudal fin rays begin to develop by the flexion period. Following this is the juvenile stage, where both jaws extend forward.
