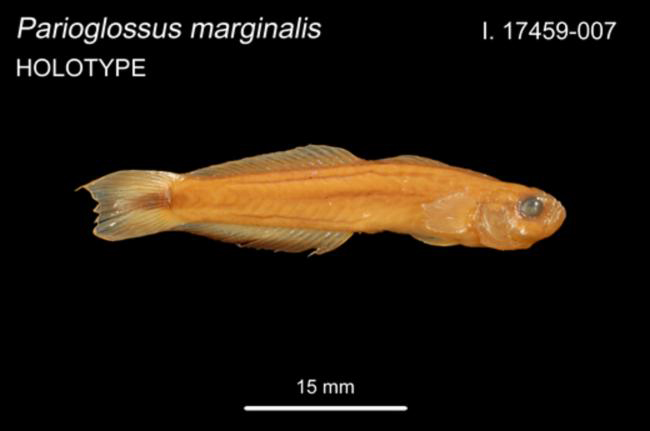
- Holotype of the Blackmargin Dartfish, Parioglossus marginalis Source: Mark Allen/Australian Museum.

Scientific classification
- Domain: Eukaryota
- Kingdom: Animalia
- Phylum: Chordata
- Class: Actinopterygii
- Order: Gobiiformes
- Family: Gobiidae
- Genus: Parioglossus; Regan, 1912

Type species
- Parioglossus taeniatus Regan, 1912

Synonyms
- Herreichthys Koumans, 1931; Herrea H. M. Smith, 1931; Herreolus H. M. Smith, 1931; Andameleotris Herre, 1939

= Parioglossus =

Genus of fishes

Parioglossus is a genus of dartfishes native to the Indian and Pacific oceans.

== Species ==
There are currently 21 recognized species in this genus:

- Parioglossus aporos Rennis & Hoese, 1985 (Poreless dartfish)
- Parioglossus caeruleolineatus T. Suzuki, Yonezawa & Sakaue, 2010
- Parioglossus dotui Tomiyama, 1958
- Parioglossus formosus (H. M. Smith, 1931) (Beautiful hover goby)
- Parioglossus galzini J. T. Williams & Lecchini, 2004
- Parioglossus interruptus T. Suzuki & Senou, 1994 (Interrupted dartfish)
- Parioglossus lineatus Rennis & Hoese, 1985 (Lined hover goby)
- Parioglossus marginalis Rennis & Hoese, 1985
- Parioglossus multiradiatus Keith, P. Bosc & Valade, 2004
- Parioglossus neocaledonicus Dingerkus & Séret, 1992
- Parioglossus nudus Rennis & Hoese, 1985 (Naked hover goby)
- Parioglossus palustris (Herre, 1945) (Borneo hoverer)
- Parioglossus philippinus (Herre, 1945) (Philippine dartfish)
- Parioglossus rainfordi McCulloch, 1921 (Rainford's dartfish)
- Parioglossus raoi (Herre, 1939) (Rao's hover goby)
- Parioglossus senoui T. Suzuki, Yonezawa & Sakaue, 2010
- Parioglossus sinensis J. S. Zhong, 1994
- Parioglossus taeniatus Regan, 1912 (Taeniatus dartfish)
- Parioglossus triquetrus Rennis & Hoese, 1985
- Parioglossus verticalis Rennis & Hoese (Vertical hover goby)
- Parioglossus winterbottomi T. Suzuki, Yonezawa & Sakaue, 2010
