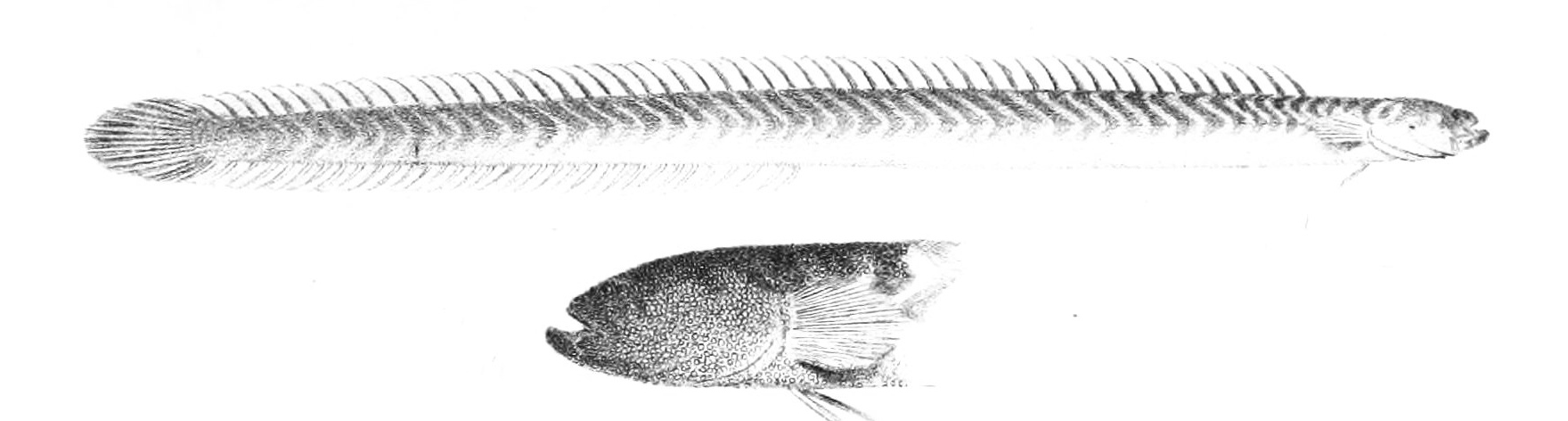
- Microdesmus dipus

Scientific classification
- Domain: Eukaryota
- Kingdom: Animalia
- Phylum: Chordata
- Class: Actinopterygii
- Order: Gobiiformes
- Family: Gobiidae
- Genus: Microdesmus; Günther, 1864

Type species
- Microdesmus dipus Günther, 1864

Synonyms
- Leptocerdale Weymouth, 1910

= Microdesmus =

Genus of fishes

Microdesmus is a genus of wormfishes native to the Atlantic Ocean and the eastern Pacific Ocean.

== Species ==
There are currently 16 recognized species in this genus:

- Microdesmus aethiopicus (Chabanaud, 1927)
- Microdesmus affinis Meek & Hildebrand, 1928 (Olivaceous wormfish)
- Microdesmus africanus C. E. Dawson, 1979
- Microdesmus bahianus C. E. Dawson, 1973
- Microdesmus carri C. R. Gilbert, 1966 (Stippled wormfish)
- Microdesmus dipus Günther, 1864 (Banded worm goby)
- Microdesmus dorsipunctatus C. E. Dawson, 1968 (Spotback wormfish)
- Microdesmus hildebrandi Reid, 1936
- Microdesmus intermedius Meek & Hildebrand, 1928
- Microdesmus knappi C. E. Dawson, 1972
- Microdesmus lanceolatus C. E. Dawson, 1962 (Lancetail wormfish)
- Microdesmus longipinnis (Weymouth, 1910) (Pink wormfish)
- Microdesmus luscus C. E. Dawson, 1977 (Blind wormfish)
- Microdesmus multiradiatus Meek & Hildebrand, 1928
- Microdesmus retropinnis D. S. Jordan & C. H. Gilbert, 1882 (Rearfin wormfish)
- Microdesmus suttkusi C. R. Gilbert, 1966 (Spotside wormfish)
