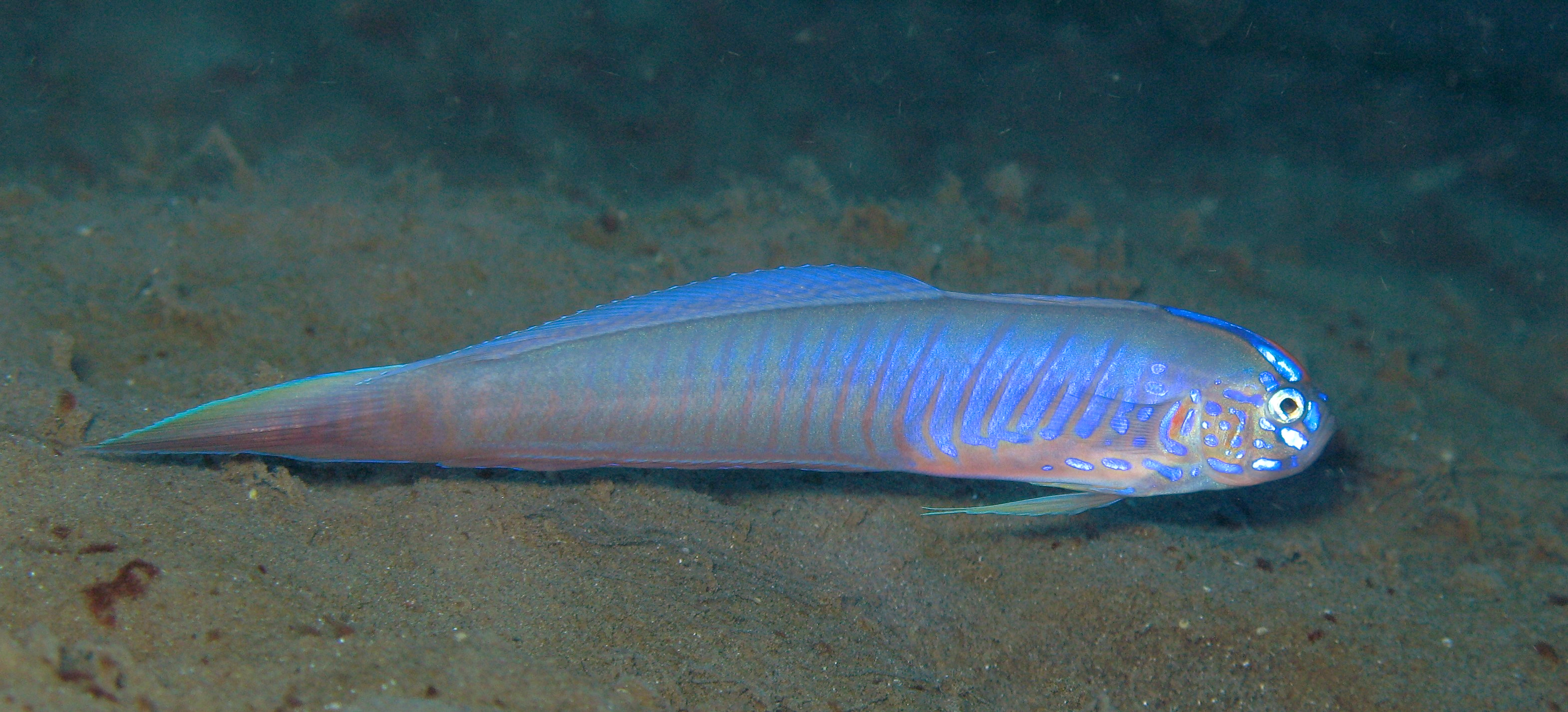
- Oxymetopon cyanoctenosum

Scientific classification
- Kingdom: Animalia
- Phylum: Chordata
- Class: Actinopterygii
- Order: Gobiiformes
- Family: Gobiidae
- Genus: Oxymetopon; Bleeker, 1861

Type species
- Oxymetopon typus Bleeker, 1861

= Oxymetopon =

Genus of fishes

Oxymetopon is a genus of fish formerly classified in the family Microdesmidae but now classified in the Gobiidae. They are native to the western Pacific Ocean. They are sometimes called ribbon-gobies.

== Species ==
There are currently 5 recognized species in this genus:

- Oxymetopon compressum W. L. Y. Chan, 1966 (Robust ribbongoby)
- Oxymetopon curticauda Prokofiev, 2016
- Oxymetopon cyanoctenosum Klausewitz & Condé, 1981 (Blue-barred ribbongoby)
- Oxymetopon filamentosum Fourmanoir, 1967
- Oxymetopon typus Bleeker, 1861 (Sail-fin ribbongoby)
