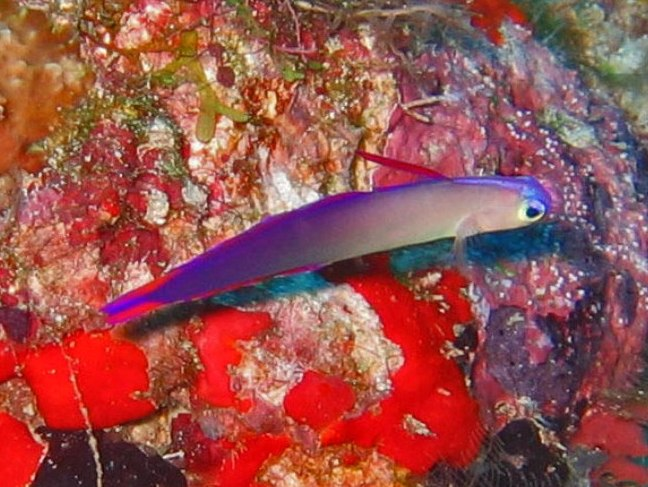
- Elegant Firefish (N. decora)

Scientific classification
- Domain: Eukaryota
- Kingdom: Animalia
- Phylum: Chordata
- Class: Actinopterygii
- Order: Gobiiformes
- Family: Gobiidae
- Genus: Nemateleotris; Fowler, 1938

Type species
- Nemateleotris magnifica Fowler, 1938

= Nemateleotris =

Genus of fishes

Nemateleotris is a genus of dartfishes native to the Indian and Pacific oceans.

== Species ==
There are currently four recognized species in this genus:

- Nemateleotris decora J. E. Randall & G. R. Allen, 1973 (Elegant firefish)
- Nemateleotris exquisita J. E. Randall & Connell, 2013
- Nemateleotris helfrichi J. E. Randall & G. R. Allen, 1973 (Helfrichs' dartfish)
- Nemateleotris magnifica Fowler, 1938 (Fire goby)
- Nemateleotris lavandula Yi-Kai Tea & Helen K. Larson, 2023 (Lavender-blushed dartfish)
