= Aioliops =

Scientific classification
- Kingdom: Animalia
- Phylum: Chordata
- Class: Actinopterygii
- Order: Gobiiformes
- Family: Gobiidae
- Subfamily: Ptereleotrinae
- Genus: Aioliops; Rennis & Hoese, 1987

Type species
- Aioliops tetrophthalmus Rennis & Hoese, 1987

Genus of fishes

Aioliops is a genus of dartfishes native to the central western Pacific Ocean.

== Species ==
There are currently four recognized species in this genus:

- Aioliops brachypterus Rennis & Hoese, 1987 (Shortfin minidartfish)
- Aioliops megastigma Rennis & Hoese, 1987 (Bigspot minidartfish)
- Aioliops novaeguineae Rennis & Hoese, 1987 (New guinea minidartfish)
- Aioliops tetrophthalmus Rennis & Hoese, 1987
