= Zagadkogobius =

Zagadkogobius ourlazon

Conservation status
- Data Deficient (IUCN 3.1)

Scientific classification
- Kingdom: Animalia
- Phylum: Chordata
- Class: Actinopterygii
- Order: Gobiiformes
- Family: Gobiidae
- Genus: Zagadkogobius; Prokofiev, 2017
- Species: Z. ourlazon

Binomial name
- Zagadkogobius ourlazon Prokofiev, 2017

Species of fish

Zagadkogobius ourlazon is a species of fish in the family Microdesmidae native to the deep-water of southwestern South China Sea. This species is the only member of its genus.
