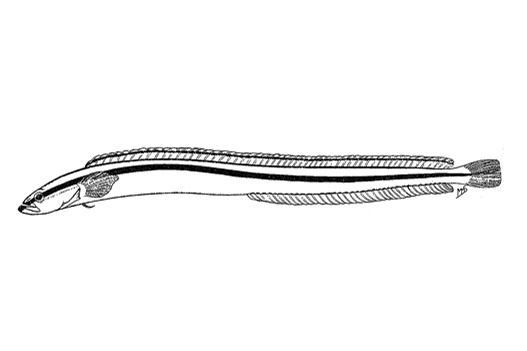
- Gunnellichthys copleyi

Scientific classification
- Domain: Eukaryota
- Kingdom: Animalia
- Phylum: Chordata
- Class: Actinopterygii
- Order: Gobiiformes
- Family: Gobiidae
- Genus: Gunnellichthys; Bleeker, 1858

Type species
- Gunnellichthys pleurotaenia Bleeker, 1858

Synonyms
- Paragobioides Kendall & Goldsborough, 1911

= Gunnellichthys =

Genus of fishes

Gunnellichthys is a genus of wormfishes native to the Indian Ocean to the central Pacific Ocean.

== Species ==
There are currently seven recognized species in this genus:

- Gunnellichthys copleyi (J. L. B. Smith, 1951)
- Gunnellichthys curiosus C. E. Dawson, 1968 (Curious wormfish)
- Gunnellichthys grandoculis (Kendall & Goldsborough, 1911)
- Gunnellichthys irideus J. L. B. Smith, 1958
- Gunnellichthys monostigma J. L. B. Smith, 1958 (Onespot wormfish)
- Gunnellichthys pleurotaenia Bleeker, 1858 (Onestripe wormfish)
- Gunnellichthys viridescens C. E. Dawson, 1968 (Yellowstripe wormfish)
