= Pterocerdale =

Conservation status
- Data Deficient (IUCN 3.1)

Scientific classification
- Kingdom: Animalia
- Phylum: Chordata
- Class: Actinopterygii
- Division: Teleostei
- Order: Gobiiformes
- Family: Gobiidae
- Genus: Pterocerdale; Hoese & Motomura, 2009
- Species: P. insolita

Binomial name
- Pterocerdale insolita Hoese & Motomura, 2009

Species of fish

Pterocerdale insolita is a species of freshwater dartfish known only from Weipa, Queensland, Australia. This species grows to a length of 43.5 centimetres (17.1 in) SL. This species is the only known member of its genus.
