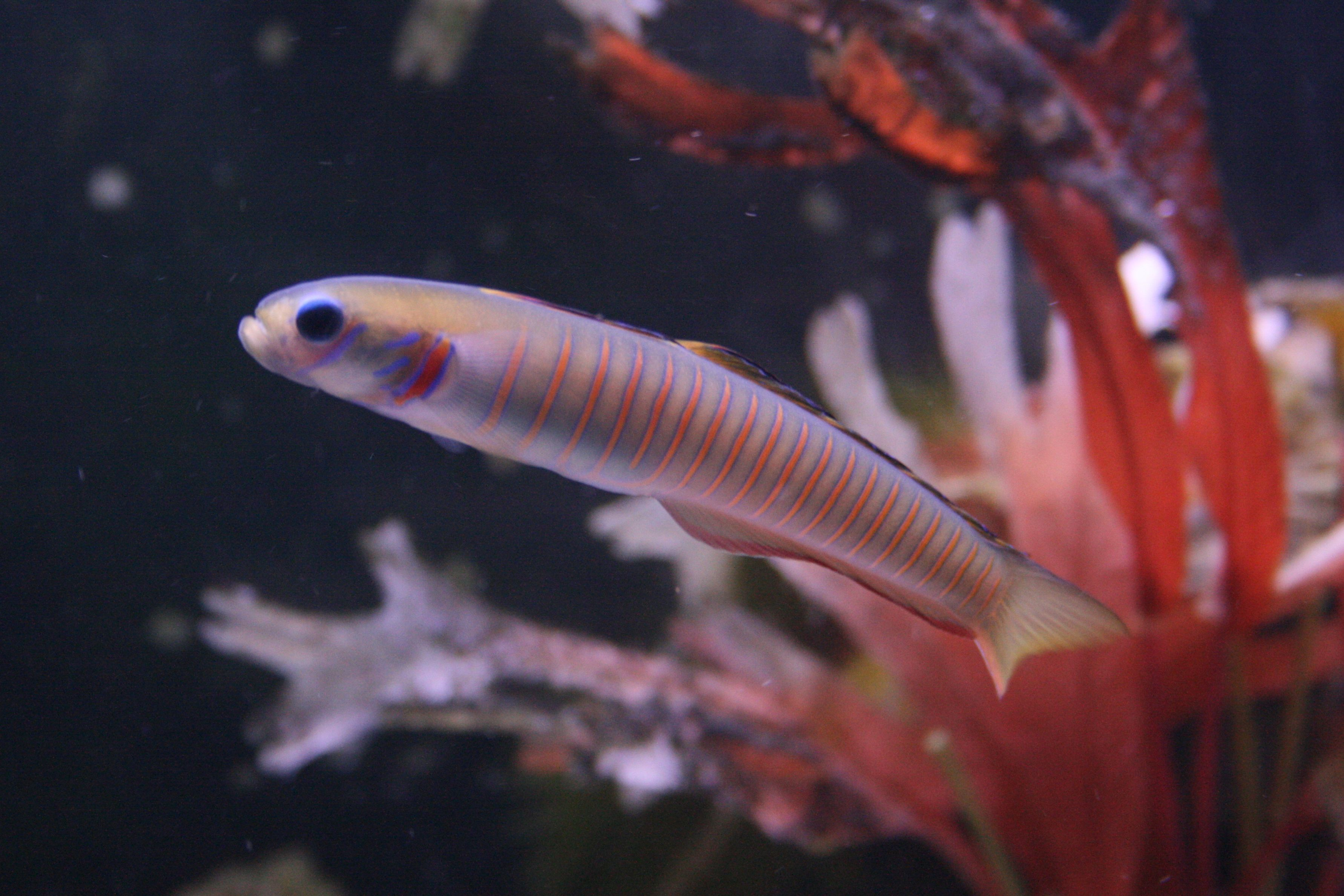
- Chinese zebra goby (P. zebra)

Scientific classification
- Kingdom: Animalia
- Phylum: Chordata
- Class: Actinopterygii
- Order: Gobiiformes
- Family: Gobiidae
- Genus: Ptereleotris; T. N. Gill, 1863

Type species
- Eleotris microlepis Bleeker, 1856

Synonyms
- Ioglossus T. H. Bean, 1882; Vireosa D. S. Jordan & Snyder, 1901; Encaeura D. S. Jordan & C. L. Hubbs, 1925; Laccoeleotris Fowler, 1935; Pogonoculius Fowler, 1938; Gracileotris Herre, 1953

= Ptereleotris =

Genus of fishes

Ptereleotris is a genus of dartfishes found in the Atlantic, Indian and Pacific oceans.

== Species ==
There are currently 20 recognized species in this genus:

- Ptereleotris arabica J. E. Randall & Hoese, 1985
- Ptereleotris brachyptera J. E. Randall & T. Suzuki, 2008 (Lowfin dartfish)
- Ptereleotris caeruleomarginata G. R. Allen, Erdmann & Cahyani, 2012 (Bluemargin dartfish)
- Ptereleotris calliura (D. S. Jordan & C. H. Gilbert, 1882) (Blue goby)
- Ptereleotris carinata W. A. Bussing, 2001 (Panamic dartfish)
- Ptereleotris crossogenion J. E. Randall & T. Suzuki, 2008 (Fringechin dartfish)
- Ptereleotris evides (D. S. Jordan & C. L. Hubbs, 1925) (Blackfin dartfish)
- Ptereleotris grammica J. E. Randall & Lubbock, 1982 (Lined dartfish)
- Ptereleotris hanae (D. S. Jordan & Snyder, 1901) (Blue hana goby)
- Ptereleotris helenae (J. E. Randall, 1968) (Hovering goby)
- Ptereleotris heteroptera (Bleeker, 1855) (Blacktail goby)
- Ptereleotris kallista J. E. Randall & T. Suzuki, 2008 (Beautiful Dartfish)
- Ptereleotris lineopinnis (Fowler, 1935) (Sad glider)
- Ptereleotris melanopogon J. E. Randall & Hoese, 1985
- Ptereleotris microlepis (Bleeker, 1856) (Blue gudgeon)
- Ptereleotris monoptera J. E. Randall & Hoese, 1985 (Lyre-tail dart-goby)
- Ptereleotris randalli Gasparini, L. A. Rocha & Floeter, 2001 (Brazilian dartfish)
- Ptereleotris rubristigma G. R. Allen, Erdmann & Cahyani, 2012 (Redspot dartfish)
- Ptereleotris uroditaenia J. E. Randall & Hoese, 1985 (Flagtail dartfish)
- Ptereleotris zebra (Fowler, 1938) (Chinese zebra goby)
