= Mid-Pacific Research Laboratory =

The Mid-Pacific Research Laboratory was a marine research facility located in a former US Coast Guard LORAN station on the northern tip of Enewetak Island, part of the Enewetak Atoll in the Marshall Islands. It was opened in 1952, when it was called the Eniwetok Marine Biological Laboratory, on the island of Medren, and in the early part of its operation, it was typically staffed and active when nuclear testing by the United States was being carried out. In the years following the end of nuclear testing in 1958, the facility was moved to Enewetak Island, where it was still staffed for only part of the year until 1974, when it gained full-time research staff. In 1979, its name was changed to the Mid-Pacific Research Laboratory. Research carried out at the lab included studies on energy relationships, symbiosis, colonization of the land by marine organisms, metabolic adaptations of marine organisms, and taxonomy. The lab was funded by the University of Hawaii and the US Department of Energy The laboratory was closed down after the Department of Energy ceased funding it in 1983, although research was still carried out for some years afterwards with alternative sponsorships.

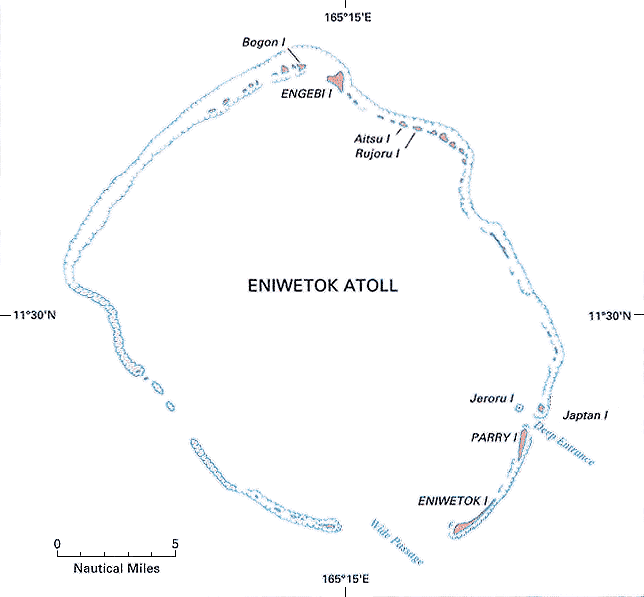
Enewetak map
