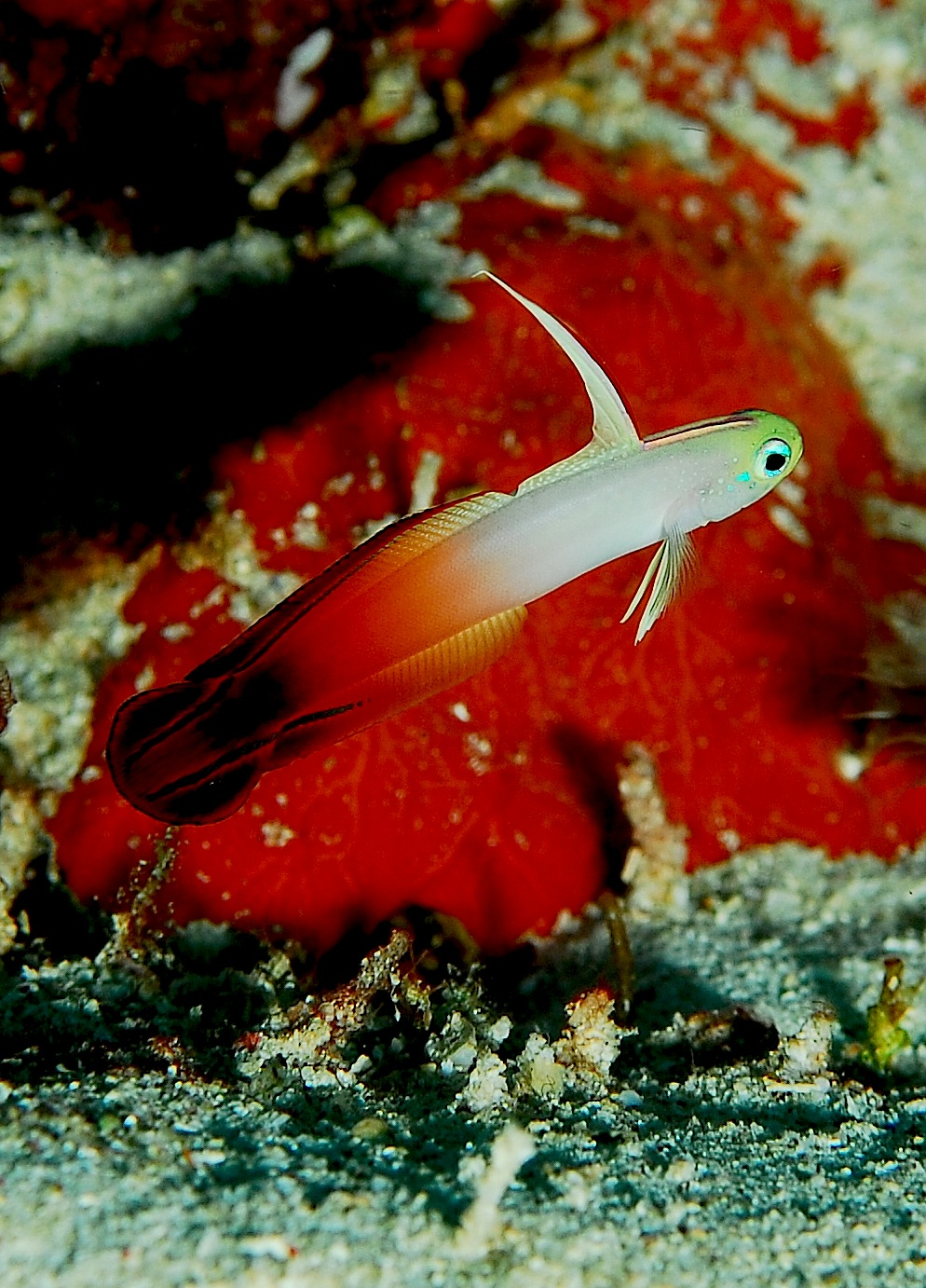
- Nemateleotris magnifica

Scientific classification
- Kingdom: Animalia
- Phylum: Chordata
- Class: Actinopterygii
- Order: Gobiiformes
- Family: Gobiidae
- Subfamily: Ptereleotrinae

Genera
- Aioliops; Navigobius; Nemateleotris; Oxymetopon; Parioglossus; Ptereleotris; Pterocerdale; Zagadkogobius

= Dartfish =

Dartfishes

Subfamily of fishes

Dartfishes are a group of fish, formerly considered to be a subfamily, Ptereleotrinae, of goby-like fishes in the family Microdesmidae of the order Gobiiformes, Authorities now consider the species in the family Microdesmidae are within the Gobiidae, although the researchers do not define the taxonomic status of this grouping within that family. They are saltwater fish.

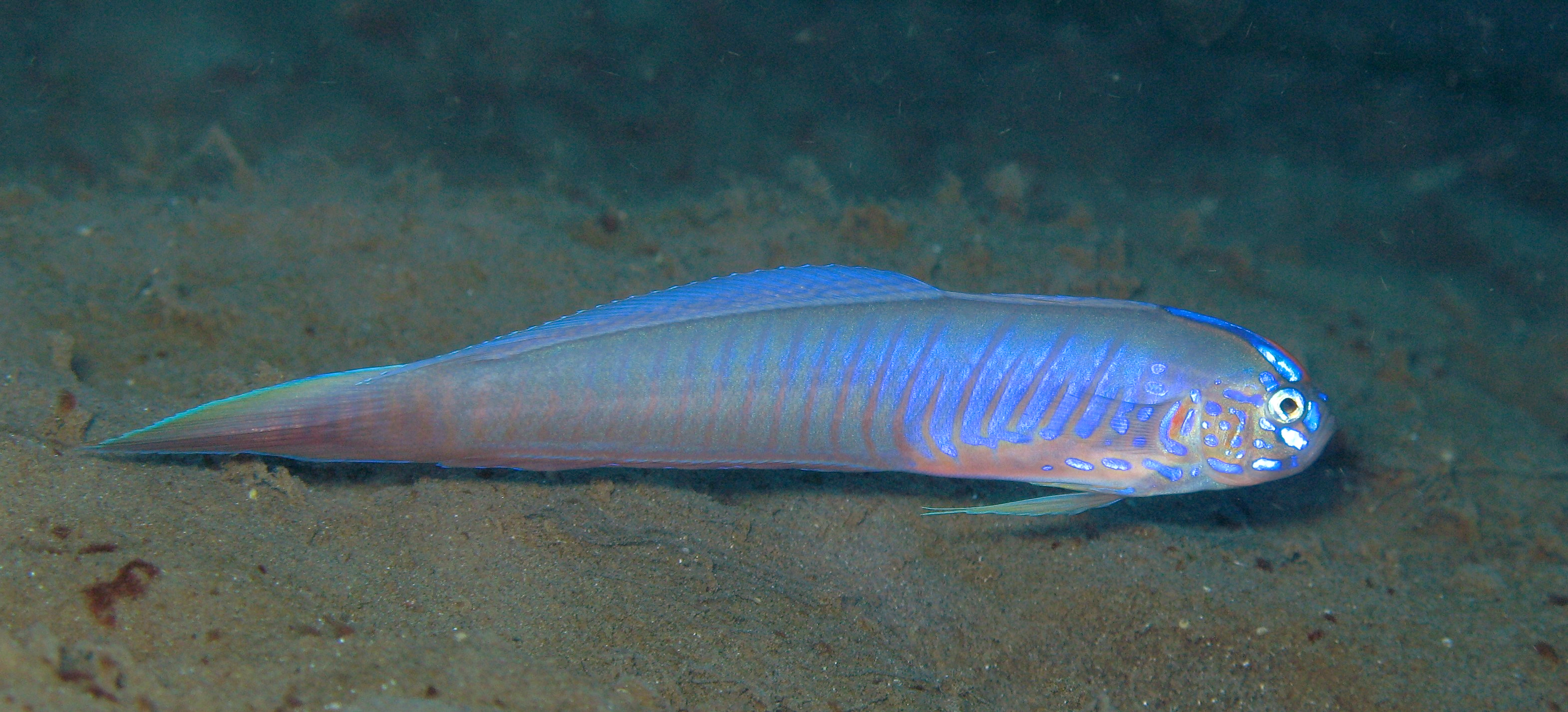
Oxymetopon cyanoctenosum
