= List of freshwater fish of Russia =

List of freshwater fish of Russia includes species of freshwater fish found in Russian Federation, and includes those introduced.

== Acipenseriformes ==
=== Acipenseridae (Sturgeons) ===
- Acipenser
  - Acipenser baerii — Siberian sturgeon
  - Acipenser gueldenstaedtii — Russian sturgeon
  - Acipenser mikadoi — Sakhalin sturgeon
  - Acipenser nudiventris — Fringebarbel sturgeon
  - Acipenser persicus — Persian sturgeon
  - Acipenser ruthenus — Sterlet
  - Acipenser schrenckii — Japanese sturgeon
  - Acipenser stellatus — Starry sturgeon
  - Acipenser sturio — European sea sturgeon
- Huso
  - Huso dauricus — Kaluga sturgeon
  - Huso huso — Beluga sturgeon

=== Polyodontidae (Paddlefishes) ===
- Polyodon
  - Polyodon spathula — American paddlefish; North American species, acclimatized

== Clupeiformes ==
=== Clupeidae (Herring, shads, sardines, and menhadens)) ===
- Alosa (River herrings)
  - Alosa alosa — Allis shad
  - Alosa caspia — Caspian shad
  - Alosa immaculata — Pontic shad
  - Alosa kessleri — Caspian anadromous shad
- Clupeonella
  - Clupeonella abrau — Abrau sprat
  - Clupeonella cultriventris — Black Sea sprat

== Salmoniformes ==
=== Salmonidae ===
==== Subfamily Salmoninae ====
- Brachymystax (Lenoks)
  - Brachymystax lenok — Sharp-snouted lenok
  - Brachymystax tumensis — Blunt-snouted lenok
- Hucho
  - Hucho perryi — Japanese huchen, Sakhalin taimen
  - Hucho taimen — Taimen
- Oncorhynchus (Pacific salmon and Pacific trout)
  - Oncorhynchus gorbuscha — Pink salmon, humpback salmon
  - Oncorhynchus keta — Chum salmon, dog salmon, keta salmon, silverbrite salmon
  - Oncorhynchus kisutch — Coho salmon, silver salmon, silvers
  - Oncorhynchus masou — masu salmon, cherry salmon, Japanese salmon, seema
  - Oncorhynchus mykiss — Rainbow trout
  - Oncorhynchus nerka — Sockeye salmon, red salmon, blueback salmon, kokanee
  - Oncorhynchus tshawytscha — Chinook salmon
- Salmo
  - Salmo ezenami — Kezenoi-am trout
  - Salmo labrax — Black Sea salmon
  - Salmo salar — Atlantic salmon
  - Salmo trutta — Brown trout
- Salvelinus (Char)
  - Salvelinus albus — White char
  - Salvelinus alpinus — Arctic char
  - Salvelinus andriashevi — Chukot char
  - Salvelinus boganidae — Boganida char
  - Salvelinus czerskii — Cherskii's char
  - Salvelinus drjagini — Dryagin's char
  - Salvelinus elgyticus — Small-mouth char
  - Salvelinus jacuticus — Yakutian char
  - Salvelinus kronocius
  - Salvelinus lepechini
  - Salvelinus leucomaenis — Whitespotted char
  - Salvelinus levanidovi
  - Salvelinus malma — Dolly Varden trout
  - Salvelinus neiva — Neiva
  - Salvelinus schmidti
  - Salvelinus taimyricus
  - Salvelinus taranetzi — Taranets char
  - Salvelinus tolmachoffi — Lake Yessey char
- Salvethymus
  - Salvethymus svetovidovi — Long-finned charr

==== Subfamily Coregoninae ====
- Coregonus (Whitefishes)
  - Coregonus albula — Vendace
  - Coregonus autumnalis — Arctic cisco
  - Coregonus baicalensis
  - Coregonus chadary — Khadary whitefish
  - Coregonus laurettae — Bering cisco
  - Coregonus lavaretus — common whitefish, European whitefish; lavaret
  - Coregonus migratorius — Omul
  - Coregonus muksun — Muksun
  - Coregonus nasus — Broad whitefish
  - Coregonus peled — Peled
  - Coregonus sardinella — Sardine cisco
  - Coregonus tugun — Tugun
  - Coregonus ussuriensis — Amur whitefish
- Prosopium
  - Prosopium coulterii — Pygmy whitefish
  - Prosopium cylindraceum — Round whitefish
- Stenodus
  - Stenodus leucichthys — Beloribitsa
  - Stenodus nelma — Nelma, sheefish, or inconnu

==== Subfamily Thymallinae ====
- Thymallus (Graylings)
  - Thymallus arcticus — Arctic grayling
  - Thymallus baicalensis — Baikal black grayling
  - Thymallus brevipinnis — Baikal white grayling
  - Thymallus brevirostris — Mongolian grayling
  - Thymallus burejensis — Bureya grayling
  - Thymallus flavomaculatus — Yellow-spotted grayling
  - Thymallus grubii — Amur grayling
  - Thymallus mertensii
  - Thymallus pallasii — East Siberian grayling
  - Thymallus svetovidovi — Upper Yenisei grayling
  - Thymallus thymallus — Grayling
  - Thymallus tugarinae — Lower Amur grayling

== Osmeriformes ==
=== Osmeridae (Freshwater smelts, typical smelts) ===
- Hypomesus
  - Hypomesus japonicus
  - Hypomesus nipponensis — Japanese smelt
  - Hypomesus olidus — Pond smelt
- Osmerus
  - Osmerus eperlanus — European smelt
  - Osmerus mordax — Rainbow smelt

== Esociformes ==
=== Esocidae (Pikes) ===
- Esox
  - Esox lucius — Northern pike
  - Esox reichertii — Amur pike

=== Umbridae (Mudminnows) ===
- Dallia
  - Dallia admirabilis
  - Dallia delicatissima
  - Dallia pectoralis — Alaska blackfish

== Anguilliformes ==
=== Anguillidae (Freshwater eels) ===
- Anguilla
  - Anguilla anguilla — European eel

== Cypriniformes ==
=== Cyprinidae ===
- Abbottina (False gudgeons)
  - Abbottina rivularis — Chinese false gudgeon
- Abramis
  - Abramis brama — Common bream
- Acanthorhodeus (Spiny bitterlings)
  - Acanthorhodeus chankaensis — Khanka spiny bitterling
- Acheilognathus (Bitterlings)
  - Acheilognathus asmussii — Russian bitterling
- Alburnoides (Bleaks)
  - Alburnoides bipunctatus — Schneider, spirlin, bleak, riffle minnow
- Alburnus (Bleaks)
  - Alburnus alburnus — Common bleak
  - Alburnus chalcoides — Danube bleak or Caspian shemaya
- Aphyocypris
  - Aphyocypris chinensis — Chinese bleak
- Aspius
  - Aspius aspius — Asp
- Ballerus (Breams)
  - Ballerus ballerus — Zope, blue bream
  - Ballerus sapa — White-eye bream
- Barbus (Typical barbels and barbs)
  - Barbus barbus — Common barbel
  - Barbus ciscaucasicus — Terek barbel
  - Barbus tauricus — Crimean barbel
- Blicca
  - Blicca bjoerkna — Silver bream
- Carassius
  - Carassius carassius — Crucian carp
  - Carassius gibelio — Prussian carp
- Chanodichthys
  - Chanodichthys dabryi — Humpback
  - Chanodichthys erythropterus — Predatory carp
  - Chanodichthys mongolicus — Mongolian redfin
- Chondrostoma (Nases)
  - Chondrostoma colchicum — Colchic nase
  - Chondrostoma nasus — Common nase, sneep
  - Chondrostoma oxyrhynchum — Terek nase
  - Chondrostoma variabile — Volga undermouth
- Ctenopharyngodon
  - Ctenopharyngodon idella — Grass carp, white amur
- Culter
  - Culter alburnus
- Cyprinus (Typical carps)
  - Cyprinus carpio — Common carp
- Elopichthys
  - Elopichthys bambusa — Yellowcheek or kanyu
- Gnathopogon
  - Gnathopogon strigatus — Manchurian gudgeon
- Gobio (Typical gudgeons)
  - Gobio gobio — Gudgeon
  - Gobio soldatovi — Soldatov's gudgeon
- Gobiobotia
  - Gobiobotia pappenheimi — Eightbarbel gudgeon
- Hemibarbus
  - Hemibarbus labeo — Barbel steed
  - Hemibarbus maculatus — Spotted steed
- Hemiculter
  - Hemiculter leucisculus — Sharpbelly
  - Hemiculter lucidus — Ussuri Sharpbelly
- Hypophthalmichthys
  - Hypophthalmichthys molitrix — Silver carp
  - Hypophthalmichthys nobilis — Bighead carp; Chinese species, introduced into Amur River basin, acclimatized in European part of Russia
- Ladislavia
  - Ladislavia taczanowskii — Taczanowski's gudgeon
- Leucaspius
  - Leucaspius delineatus — Sunbleak, belica, moderlieschen
- Leuciscus (Eurasian daces)
  - Leuciscus danilewskii — Danilevskii's dace
  - Leuciscus idus — Ide
  - Leuciscus leuciscus — Common dace
  - Leuciscus waleckii — Amur ide
- Luciobarbus
  - Luciobarbus brachycephalus — Aral barbel
  - Luciobarbus capito — Bulatmai barbel
- Megalobrama
  - Megalobrama terminalis — Black Amur bream
- Microphysogobio
  - Microphysogobio tungtingensis — Long-nosed gudgeon
- Mylopharyngodon
  - Mylopharyngodon piceus — Black carp, black Chinese roach
- Ochetobius
  - Ochetobius elongatus, introduced into Lake Khanka
- Opsariichthys
  - Opsariichthys uncirostris — Three-lips
- Oreoleuciscus
  - Oreoleuciscus humilis — Dwarf Altai osman
  - Oreoleuciscus potanini — Altai osman
- Parabramis
  - Parabramis pekinensis — White Amur bream
- Pelecus
  - Pelecus cultratus — Sichel, ziege, sabre carp, sabrefish
- Petroleuciscus
  - Petroleuciscus borysthenicus — Dnieper chub, Black Sea chub
- Phoxinus
  - Phoxinus phoxinus — Eurasian minnow
- Plagiognathops
  - Plagiognathops microlepis — Smallscale yellowfin
- Pseudaspius
  - Pseudaspius leptocephalus — Redfin
- Pseudorasbora
  - Pseudorasbora parva — Stone moroko
- Rhodeus (Bitterlings)
  - Rhodeus lighti — Light's bitterling
  - Rhodeus sericeus — Amur bitterling
- Rhynchocypris
  - Rhynchocypris czekanowskii — Czekanowski's minnow
  - Rhynchocypris lagowskii — Amur minnow
  - Rhynchocypris percnurus — Lake minnow
- Romanogobio
  - Romanogobio albipinnatus — White-finned gudgeon
  - Romanogobio ciscaucasicus — North Caucasian long-barbelled gudgeon
  - Romanogobio pentatrichus — Kuban long-barbelled gudgeon
  - Romanogobio tenuicorpus — Amur whitefin gudgeon
- Rutilus (Roaches)
  - Rutilus caspicus — Vobla, Caspian roach
  - Rutilus frisii — vyrezub, Black Sea roach, kutum
  - Rutilus kutum — Caspian kutum
  - Rutilus rutilus — Common roach
- Sarcocheilichthys
  - Sarcocheilichthys czerskii — Cherskii's thicklip gudgeon
  - Sarcocheilichthys sinensis — Chinese lake gudgeon
  - Sarcocheilichthys soldatovi — Soldatov's thicklip gudgeon
- Saurogobio
  - Saurogobio dabryi — Chinese lizard gudgeon
- Scardinius (Rudds)
  - Scardinius erythrophthalmus — Common Rudd
- Squalidus
  - Squalidus chankaensis — Khanka gudgeon
- Squaliobarbus
  - Squaliobarbus curriculus — Barbel chub
- Squalius (European chubs)
  - Squalius aphipsi — Aphips chub
  - Squalius cephalus — European chub
- Tinca
  - Tinca tinca — Tench
- Tribolodon
  - Tribolodon brandtii — Pacific redfin
  - Tribolodon hakonensis — Big-scaled redfin
  - Tribolodon sachalinensis
- Vimba
  - Vimba vimba — Vimba bream
- Xenocypris
  - Xenocypris argentea —

=== Catostomidae (Suckers) ===
- Catostomus
  - Catostomus catostomus — Longnose sucker
- Ictiobus (Buffalo fish)
  - Ictiobus bubalus — Smallmouth buffalo; North American species, acclimatized
  - Ictiobus cyprinellus — Bigmouth buffalo; North American species, acclimatized
  - Ictiobus niger — Black buffalo; North American species, acclimatized

=== Nemacheilidae (Stone loaches) ===
- Barbatula
  - Barbatula barbatula — Stone loach
  - Barbatula toni
- Lefua
  - Lefua costata — Eightbarbel loach
- Oxynoemacheilus
  - Oxynoemacheilus merga — Krynicki's loach

=== Cobitidae (True loaches) ===
- Cobitis (Typical spiny loaches)
  - Cobitis choii — Choi's spiny loach
  - Cobitis lutheri — Luther's spiny loach
  - Cobitis melanoleuca
  - Cobitis rossomeridionalis
  - Cobitis taenia — Spined loach
- Misgurnus (Weatherfishes, weather loaches)
  - Misgurnus anguillicaudatus — Pond loach
  - Misgurnus fossilis — Weatherfish
- Sabanejewia (Golden loaches)
  - Sabanejewia aurata — Golden spined loach
  - Sabanejewia caucasica — Ciscaucasian spined loach

=== Botiidae ===
- Parabotia
  - Parabotia mantschurica — Manchurian spiny loach

== Siluriformes ==
=== Siluridae ===
- Silurus
  - Silurus asotus — Amur catfish
  - Silurus glanis — Wels catfish
  - Silurus soldatovi — Soldatov's catfish

=== Bagridae (Naked catfishes, bagrid catfishes) ===
- Leiocassis
  - Leiocassis brashnikowi
  - Leiocassis herzensteini
  - Leiocassis ussuriensis
- Mystus
  - Mystus mica
- Tachysurus
  - Tachysurus fulvidraco — Yellowhead catfish, Korean bullhead

=== Ictaluridae ===
- Ameiurus
  - Ameiurus nebulosus — Brown bullhead; North American species, acclimatized
- Ictalurus
  - Ictalurus punctatus — Channel catfish; North American species, acclimatized

== Beloniformes ==
=== Adrianichthyidae (Ricefishes) ===
- Oryzias
  - Oryzias latipes — Japanese ricefish; acclimatized in Krasnodar Krai

== Cyprinodontiformes ==
=== Poeciliidae ===
- Gambusia (Mosquitofishes)
  - Gambusia holbrooki — Eastern mosquitofish; acclimatized in Krasnodar Krai; some populations are reported from central Russia
- Poecilia
  - Poecilia reticulata — Guppy; self-replicating populations are reported from Moskva River and Volga River

== Gadiformes ==
=== Lotidae (Rocklings) ===
- Lota
  - Lota lota — Burbot

== Gasterosteiformes ==
=== Gasterosteidae (Sticklebacks) ===
- Gasterosteus
  - Gasterosteus aculeatus — Three-spined stickleback
- Pungitius
  - Pungitius platygaster — Southern ninespined stickleback
  - Pungitius pungitius — Ninespined stickleback
  - Pungitius sinensis — Amur stickleback
  - Pungitius tymensis — Sakhalin stickleback

== Syngnathiformes ==
=== Syngnathidae ===
- Syngnathus (Seaweed pipefish)
  - Syngnathus abaster — Black-striped pipefish

== Perciformes ==
=== Percichthyidae (Temperate perches) ===
- Siniperca
  - Siniperca chuatsi — Mandarin fish, Chinese perch

=== Moronidae (Temperate basses) ===
- Morone
  - Morone saxatilis — Striped bass; North American species, acclimatized in Krasnodar Krai

=== Centrarchidae ===
- Micropterus (Black basses)
  - Micropterus salmoides — Largemouth black bass; North American species, acclimatized

=== Percidae ===
- Gymnocephalus (Ruffes)
  - Gymnocephalus acerina — Donets ruffe
  - Gymnocephalus cernua — Eurasian ruffe
- Perca (Perches)
  - Perca fluviatilis — European perch
- Percarina
  - Percarina demidoffi — Common percarina
  - Percarina maeotica — Azov percarina
- Sander
  - Sander lucioperca — Zander, pike-perch
  - Sander volgensis — Volga pikeperch, Volga zander

=== Cichlidae (Cichlids) ===
- Oreochromis
  - Oreochromis mossambicus — Mozambique tilapia; African species, acclimatized in Krasnodar Krai

=== Odontobutidae (Freshwater sleepers) ===
- Micropercops
  - Micropercops cinctus
- Perccottus
  - Perccottus glenii — Chinese sleeper, Amur sleeper

=== Gobiidae (Gobies) ===
- Acanthogobius
  - Acanthogobius flavimanus — Yellowfin goby
  - Acanthogobius lactipes
- Babka
  - Babka gymnotrachelus — Racer goby
- Benthophilus (Tadpole-gobies, pugolovkas)
  - Benthophilus baeri — Baer pugolovka
  - Benthophilus casachicus
  - Benthophilus granulosus — Granular pugolovka
  - Benthophilus macrocephalus — Caspian tadpole goby
  - Benthophilus magistri — Azov tadpole goby
  - Benthophilus mahmudbejovi — Small-spine tadpole-goby
  - Benthophilus stellatus — Stellate tadpole-goby
- Caspiosoma
  - Caspiosoma caspium
- Chaenogobius
  - Chaenogobius annularis — Forktongue goby
- Gymnogobius
  - Gymnogobius castaneus — Biringo
  - Gymnogobius macrognathus
  - Gymnogobius taranetzi
  - Gymnogobius urotaenia
- Hyrcanogobius
  - Hyrcanogobius bergi — Volga dwarf goby; the smallest Russian fish
- Knipowitschia
  - Knipowitschia caucasica — Caucasian dwarf goby
  - Knipowitschia longecaudata — Longtail dwarf goby
- Mesogobius
  - Mesogobius batrachocephalus — Knout goby
- Neogobius
  - Neogobius fluviatilis — Monkey goby
  - Neogobius melanostomus — Round goby
- Pomatoschistus
  - Pomatoschistus marmoratus — Marbled goby
- Ponticola
  - Ponticola gorlap — Caspian bighead goby
  - Ponticola platyrostris — Flatsnout goby
  - Ponticola rhodioni — Riverine goby
  - Ponticola syrman — Syrman goby
- Proterorhinus
  - Proterorhinus marmoratus — Tubenose goby
  - Proterorhinus nasalis — Eastern tubenose goby
  - Proterorhinus semilunaris — Western tubenose goby
- Rhinogobius
  - Rhinogobius brunneus — Amur goby
- Tridentiger (Tripletooth gobies)
  - Tridentiger obscurus — Dusky tripletooth goby
  - Tridentiger trigonocephalus — Chameleon goby

=== Channidae (Snakeheads) ===
- Channa
  - Channa argus — Northern snakehead

== Scorpaeniformes ==
=== Cottidae (Cottids) ===
- Cottus
  - Cottus amblystomopsis — Sakhalin sculpin
  - Cottus cognatus — Slimy sculpin
  - Cottus czerskii — Cherskii's sculpin
  - Cottus gobio — Bullhead
  - Cottus hangiongensis
  - Cottus poecilopus — Alpine bullhead
  - Cottus sibiricus — Siberian sculpin
- Mesocottus
  - Mesocottus haitej — Amur sculpin
- Myoxocephalus
  - Myoxocephalus quadricornis — Fourhorn sculpin

=== Cottocomephoridae (Bighead sculpins, Baikal sculpins) ===
This entire family is mostly endemic to Russia, where it found in Lake Baikal and surrounding lakes and rivers.

- Batrachocottus
  - Batrachocottus baicalensis — Bighead sculpin
  - Batrachocottus multiradiatus
  - Batrachocottus nikolskii — Fat sculpin
  - Batrachocottus talievi
- Cottocomephorus
  - Cottocomephorus alexandrae
  - Cottocomephorus grewingkii — Baikal yellowfin
  - Cottocomephorus inermis — Longfin Baikal sculpin
- Leocottus
  - Leocottus kesslerii — Kessler's sculpin
- Paracottus
  - Paracottus knerii — Stone sculpin

=== Comephoridae ===
This entire family is endemic to Russia, Lake Baikal.

- Comephorus (Golomyankas, Baikal oilfish)
  - Comephorus baikalensis — Big Baikal oilfish
  - Comephorus dybowskii — Little Baikal oilfish

=== Abyssocottidae (Deep-water sculpins) ===
This entire family is endemic to Russia, Lake Baikal.

- Abyssocottus
  - Abyssocottus elochini
  - Abyssocottus gibbosus
  - Abyssocottus korotneffi
- Asprocottus
  - Asprocottus abyssalis
  - Asprocottus herzensteini — Herzenstein's rough sculpin
  - Asprocottus korjakovi
  - Asprocottus parmiferus
  - Asprocottus platycephalus
  - Asprocottus pulcher
- Cottinella
  - Cottinella boulengeri — Short-headed sculpin
- Cyphocottus
  - Cyphocottus eurystomus
  - Cyphocottus megalops — Vitim sculpin
- Limnocottus
  - Limnocottus bergianus
  - Limnocottus godlewskii
  - Limnocottus griseus
  - Limnocottus pallidus
- Neocottus
  - Neocottus thermalis
  - Neocottus werestschagini
- Procottus
  - Procottus gotoi
  - Procottus gurwici — Dwarf sculpin
  - Procottus jeittelesii — Red sculpin
  - Procottus major
