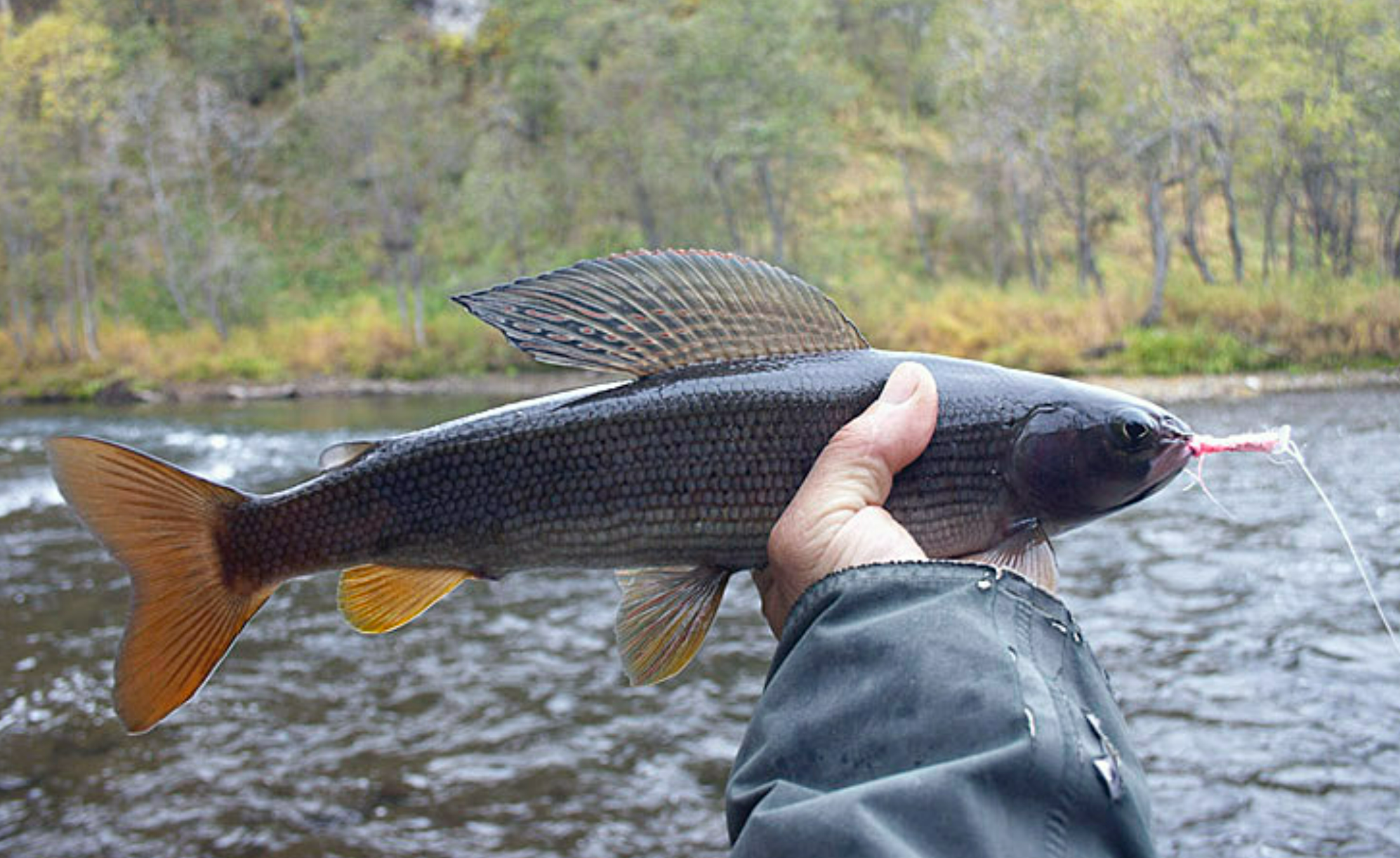
- Kamchatka grayling caught by an angler

Conservation status
- Not evaluated (IUCN 3.1)

Scientific classification
- Kingdom: Animalia
- Phylum: Chordata
- Class: Actinopterygii
- Order: Salmoniformes
- Family: Salmonidae
- Genus: Thymallus
- Species: T. mertensii

Binomial name
- Thymallus mertensii Valenciennes, 1848

Synonyms
- Thymallus arcticus mertensi (Valenciennes, 1848)

= Kamchatka grayling =

Species of fish

The Kamchatka grayling (Thymallus mertensii) is a grayling in the salmon family Salmonidae. The fish grows up to 50 cm (20 in). It is found in freshwater habitats of the Russian Far East, including the Kamchatka Peninsula, eastern part of Magadan Oblast and northwards to the southern Chukchi Peninsula.

== Description ==
Kamchatka grayling has a typically very long and high back fin, big head and mouth. Its body is covered with large and firmly set scales. The species has monotonous color which gets darker with age.

Grayling can reach 50 cm (20”) of length, 1.5 kg (3.3 lb) of weight, and the age of 18 years. The average size of the fish is 30-42 cm (12-17”) of length and .6 kg (1.3 lb). Kamchatka grayling becomes mature in 5-9 years old. The spawning season is usually from the late June to the mid of September.

== See also ==
- List of freshwater fish of Russia
