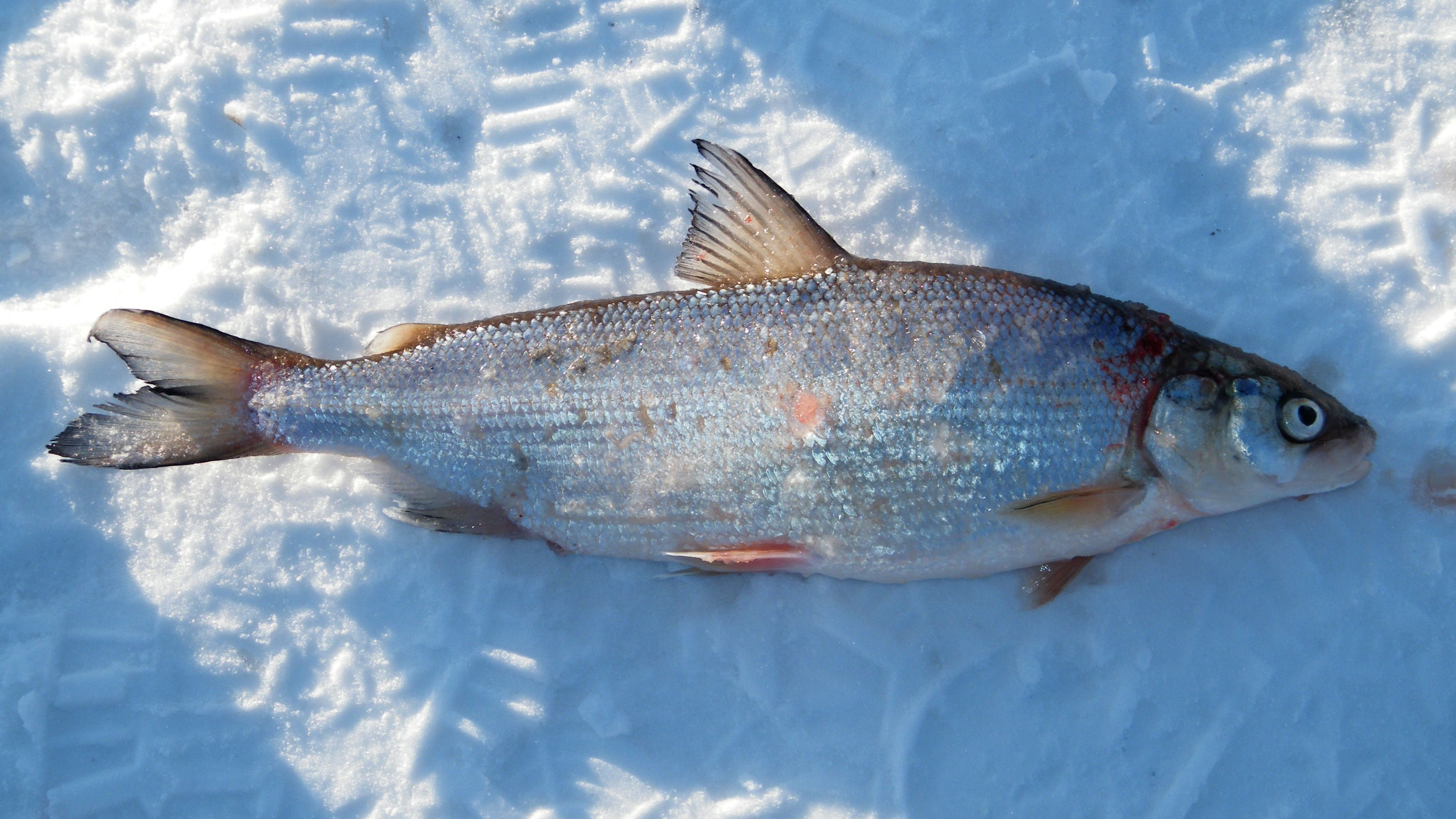

Conservation status
- Least Concern (IUCN 3.1)

Scientific classification
- Kingdom: Animalia
- Phylum: Chordata
- Class: Actinopterygii
- Order: Salmoniformes
- Family: Salmonidae
- Genus: Coregonus
- Species: C. ussuriensis

Binomial name
- Coregonus ussuriensis L. S. Berg, 1906

= Coregonus ussuriensis =

Species of fish

The Amur whitefish (Coregonus ussuriensis) is a species of freshwater whitefish. It can withstand significant salinity levels. It reaches a maximum size of 60 cm (24 in), with a maximum weight of 2 kg (4.4 lb). Its life expectancy is 10 to 11 years. The Amur whitefish is usually eaten salted or smoked.

== Distribution ==
Its distribution includes the middle reaches of the Amur, downstream of Blagoveshchensk, all along the lower reaches and including its estuary. It lives as well in the Kukhtuy river, the Tatar Strait and the southern part of the Sea of Okhotsk. It also has been recorded in Sakhalin, in the lagoons of the northwestern and northeastern coasts, as well as in the Ainskoe and Sladkoe coastal lakes. It is also found in the Zeya and Sungari rivers, and in the Ussuri River and Lake Khanka.

== See also ==
- List of freshwater fish of Russia
