= Bureya grayling =

Scientific classification
- Kingdom: Animalia
- Phylum: Chordata
- Class: Actinopterygii
- Order: Salmoniformes
- Family: Salmonidae
- Genus: Thymallus
- Species: T. burejensis

Binomial name
- Thymallus burejensis Antonov, 2004

Species of fish

The Bureya grayling (Thymallus burejensis) is a grayling in the salmon family Salmonidae. It is found in the basin of the Bureya, a tributary of the Amur, Russian Far East. In its natural freshwater habitat it is sympatric with other grayling species.

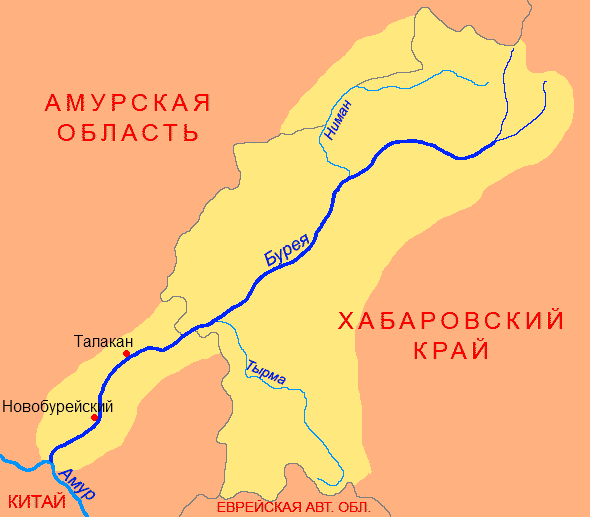
Basin of the Bureya river.

== See also ==
- List of freshwater fish of Russia
