= Salvethymus =

Conservation status
- Least Concern (IUCN 3.1)

Scientific classification
- Kingdom: Animalia
- Phylum: Chordata
- Class: Actinopterygii
- Order: Salmoniformes
- Family: Salmonidae
- Subfamily: Salmoninae
- Genus: Salvethymus; Chereshnev & Skopets, 1990
- Species: S. svetovidovi

Binomial name
- Salvethymus svetovidovi Chereshnev & Skopets, 1990

Monotypic genus of fish

Salvethymus svetovidovi, also called the long-finned charr, is a species of salmonid fish. It is endemic to Elgygytgyn Lake in Chukotka, Far East of Russia, together with two other species, the small-mouth char Salvelinus elgyticus, and the Boganid char, Salvelinus boganidae.

== Taxonomy ==
The long-finned char is a morphologically aberrant type of char; when scientifically first described in 1990, it was placed as the single species in Salvethymus, a new monotypic genus. It is closely related to the true chars in the genus Salvelinus and is phylogenetically placed within this genus; it is probably a sister lineage to the Arctic char (Salvelinus alpinus) complex.
