= East Siberian grayling =

Scientific classification
- Kingdom: Animalia
- Phylum: Chordata
- Class: Actinopterygii
- Order: Salmoniformes
- Family: Salmonidae
- Genus: Thymallus
- Species: T. pallasii

Binomial name
- Thymallus pallasii Valenciennes, 1848

Species of fish

The East Siberian grayling (Thymallus pallasii) is a grayling in the salmon family Salmonidae. Males can reach a size of 44 cm (17 in).

== Distribution ==
East Siberian grayling was first described to be found at the Kolyma River basin by Peter Simon Pallas. Its distribution range is still insufficiently understood, and is believed to include most of the rivers flowing to the Arctic coast eastward from the Khatanga River, across the East Siberian Plain, and further east to easternmost Siberia, including the rivers in the Chukotka Peninsula as well as rivers of the Sea of Okhotsk basin, such as the Ola River in the Magadan Oblast and the Kukhtuy in Khabarovsk Krai.

== Description ==
Thymallus can be distinguished by their elongated, often cylindrical body, greatly enlarged dorsal fin, small mouth and striking dorsal coloration. Adult dorsum color ranges from dark purple to blue/black, and claret red spots are sometimes observed above ventral fins and on the caudal peduncle. Adults can have dark lateral spotting, and the lower caudal lobe is often longer than the upper lobe East-Siberian grayling were first described by Valenciennes (1828) and were described as having a less acute pectoral fin, radiating streaks on the operculum, longer dorsal fin rays, and narrower maxillae than other Thymallus sp.. Additionally, Thymallus sp. can be distinguished by the extension of the upper jaw beyond the anterior of the eye but not to the midpoint of the eye. Thymallus sp. including T. pallasii often have plastic phenotypes distinguished by differences in relative length, rows of spots on dorsal fins and caudal peduncle color.

== Reproduction and development ==
Thymallus spawn polygamously in the spring in rivers and lakes, with males guarding independent territories. Eggs are laid in shallow areas of clear, fast-moving streams with rocky or sandy bottoms, and incubate for between 13 and 18 days before hatching. Adults do not perform any parental care. Juveniles reach sexual maturity at around 2 – 6 years old, and maximum sizes recorded are 515 mm and 488 mm, for females and males, respectively. Grayling live up to 22 years, and are known to have complex local migrations corresponding with the seasons.

== Behavior, diet and predation ==
Adults are visual predators and stay in depths of 110 – 152 cm. Grayling feed primarily on aquatic and terrestrial insects, aquatic insect larvae, fish, small mammals, and crustacean zooplankton, and often require clear streams to feed. East-Siberian grayling predators include humans, as well as pike (Esox sp.).

== Economic importance and conservation status ==
While Thymallus do not have significant commercial economic importance, they are culturally relevant and are harvested massively by anglers. Additionally, grayling require rocky or sandy bottom streams and well oxygenated water- giving them important potential as an indicator species. Thymallus pallasii are considered a species of least concern, and recent genetic work indicates T. pallasii may be part of a larger group, T. arcticus sl., composed of T. mertensii, pallasii and signifer.

== See also ==
- List of freshwater fish of Russia
