= Kessler's sculpin =

Conservation status
- Least Concern (IUCN 3.1)

Scientific classification
- Kingdom: Animalia
- Phylum: Chordata
- Class: Actinopterygii
- Order: Perciformes
- Suborder: Cottoidei
- Superfamily: Cottoidea
- Family: Cottidae
- Genus: Leocottus; Palmer, 1961
- Species: L. kesslerii

Binomial name
- Leocottus kesslerii (Dybowski, 1874)

Synonyms
- Cottus kesslerii Dybowski, 1874; Cottus kesslerii kesslerii Dybowski, 1874; Cottus trigonocephalus Gratzianov, 1902; Cottus kesslerii bauntovi Taliev, 1946; Paracottus pelagicus Taliev, 1955; Paracottus kessleri arachlensis Tarchova, 1962; Paracottus kessleri gussinensis Tarchova, 1962

Species of fish

Kessler's sculpin (Leocottus kesslerii) is a species of Baikal sculpin, a freshwater fish native to Russia and Mongolia where it occurs in Lake Baikal and surrounding lakes as well as the Selenga, Angara and Bain Gol rivers. It is the only member of its genus. In Lake Baikal it occurs on sandy, rocky-sandy or sandy-muddy bottoms, ranging from relatively shallow water to depths of 70 m (230 ft). In rivers they mainly occur in slow-flowing channels and floodplains.

This species grows to a total length of 14 cm (5.5 in), but typically is 9–11 cm (3.5–4.3 in). Adults are crepuscular, and feed on gammarids, chironomids, and young fish. Spawning takes place in May to June at 3–5 m (9.8–16.4 ft) depths. Eggs are deposited under stones, and the male stays guarding the eggs. The pelagic larvae feed on plankton.

The Kessler's sculpin is sometimes caught by commercial fishers, and it is eaten by the Baikal seal, comprising about 0.3% of its diet in the winter and spring, and significantly more in the autumn.

Kessler's sculpin was first formally described as Cottus kessleri in 1874 by the Polish zoologist Benedykt Dybowski with its type locality given as Lake Baikal and the Angara, Irkut and Selenga rivers in Siberia. In 1955 the name Leocottus was posthumously published by Dmitrii Nikolaevich Taliev, as a subgenus of Paracottus, but he did not designate a type species so the name was unavailable under the ICZN. In 1961 the British ichthyologist Geoffrey Palmer published the name in The Zoological Record. It is now regarded as a valid monospecific genus which was classified in the family Cottocomephoridae but the 5th edition of Fishes of the World states that this taxon forms a clade arising from within the genus Cottus.
