= Cherskii's sculpin =

Conservation status
- Least Concern (IUCN 3.1)

Scientific classification
- Kingdom: Animalia
- Phylum: Chordata
- Class: Actinopterygii
- Order: Perciformes
- Suborder: Cottoidei
- Family: Cottidae
- Genus: Cottus
- Species: C. czerskii

Binomial name
- Cottus czerskii Berg, 1913

Species of fish

Cherskii's sculpin (Cottus czerskii) is a species of fish in the family Cottidae. It is found in rivers flowing into the Sea of Japan from Primorsky Krai to Korea. It reaches a maximum length of 19.5 cm.

== See also ==
- Cottus
- Cottidae
