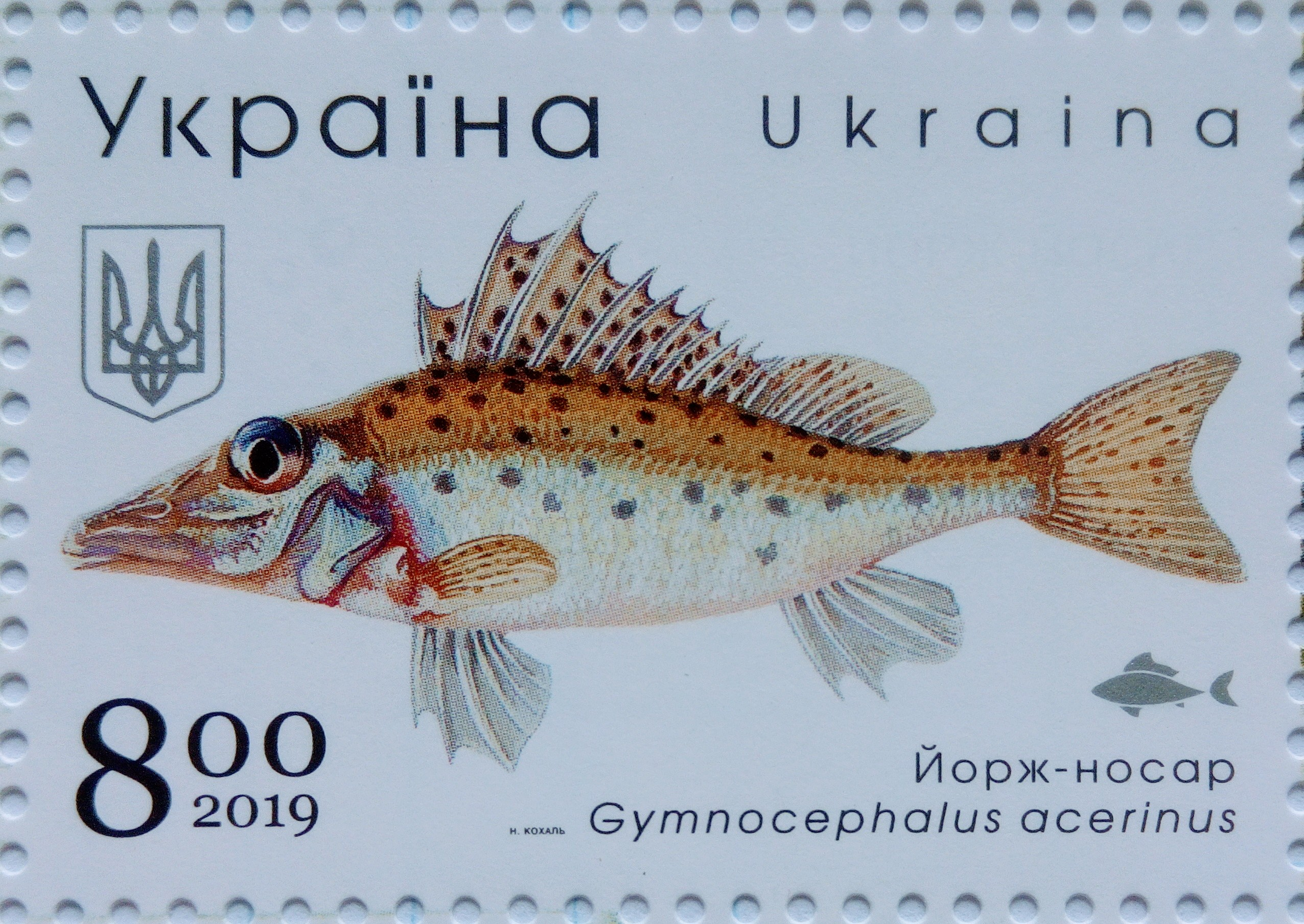

Conservation status
- Least Concern (IUCN 3.1)

Scientific classification
- Kingdom: Animalia
- Phylum: Chordata
- Class: Actinopterygii
- Order: Perciformes
- Family: Percidae
- Genus: Gymnocephalus
- Species: G. acerina

Binomial name
- Gymnocephalus acerina (J. F. Gmelin, 1789)

Synonyms
- Perca acerina Güldenstädt, 1774 (ambiguous); Acerina acerina (Güldenstädt, 1774) (ambiguous); Perca acerina J. F. Gmelin, 1789

= Donets ruffe =

Species of fish

The Donets ruffe (Gymnocephalus acerina) is a species of perch native to eastern Europe where it occurs in the basins of the Black Sea and the Sea of Azov. They inhabit freshwater lakes and rivers usually over hard compacted sand. They are predominantly crepuscular and prey mostly on invertebrates (crustaceans, insect larvae, mollusks), rarely on fish. They are inactive during winter months, and usually move to deeper places until the ice melts. Spawning occurs in small rivers with heavy currents. This species reaches a length of 21 centimetres (8.3 in) SL.
