= Sakhalin sculpin =

Conservation status
- Least Concern (IUCN 3.1)

Scientific classification
- Kingdom: Animalia
- Phylum: Chordata
- Class: Actinopterygii
- Order: Perciformes
- Suborder: Cottoidei
- Family: Cottidae
- Genus: Cottus
- Species: C. amblystomopsis

Binomial name
- Cottus amblystomopsis Schmidt, 1904

Species of fish

The Sakhalin sculpin (Cottus amblystomopsis) is a species of amphidromous ray-finned fish belonging to the family Cottidae, the typical sculpins. It is found in eastern Russia to northern Japan. It reaches a maximum length of 20.8 cm. The Sakhalin sculpin was first formally described in 1904 by the Russian zoologist Peter Yulievich Schmidt with its type locality given as the Lyutoga River on Sakhalin. This species is sometimes placed in the subgenus Cephalocottus. The specific name is a misspelling of Ambystoma, the axolotl (Ambystoma mexicanus) combined with opsis, meaning "having the look of", and Schmidt described it as having a head that is "strongly dorsoventrally depressed, wide, nearly flat dorsally, abruptly sloping laterally, similar to the head of an axolotl" (translation).
