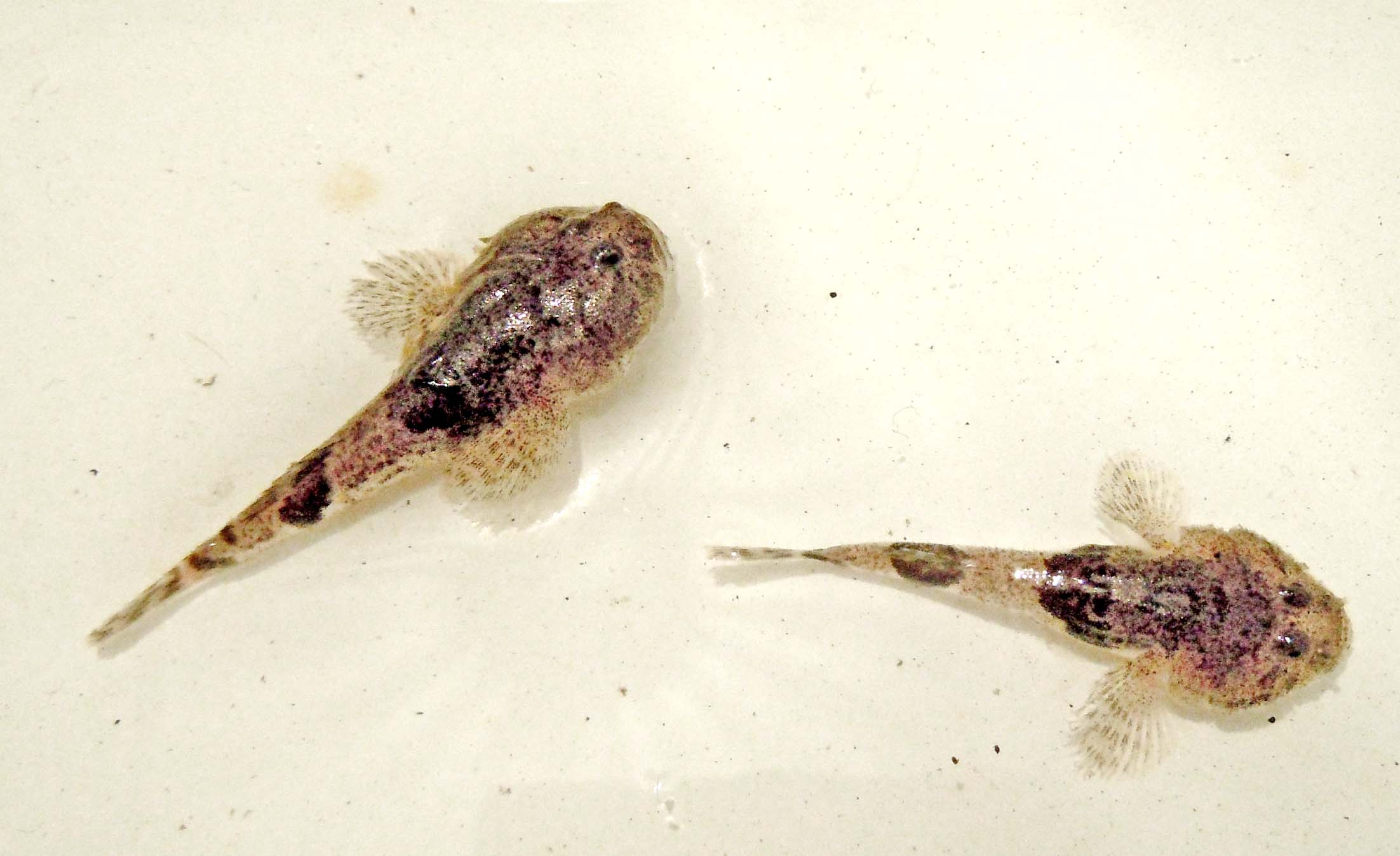

Conservation status
- Least Concern (IUCN 3.1)

Scientific classification
- Kingdom: Animalia
- Phylum: Chordata
- Class: Actinopterygii
- Division: Teleostei
- Order: Gobiiformes
- Family: Gobiidae
- Genus: Benthophilus
- Species: B. granulosus

Binomial name
- Benthophilus granulosus Kessler, 1877
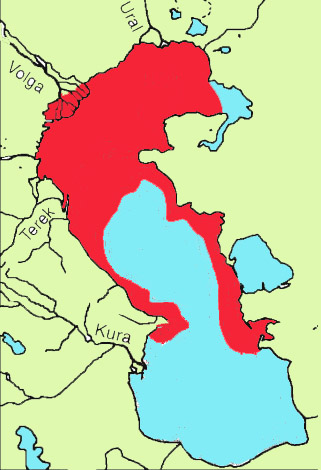
- The range of the granular pugolovka

= Granular pugolovka =

Species of fish

The granular pugolovka (Benthophilus granulosus) is a species of gobiid fish found throughout the Caspian Sea. It is a small fish, with a length of up to 5.6 centimetres (2.2 in) TL. It was listed as Least Concern by the IUCN in 2008: there are no known major threats. Granular pugolovkas are very abundant in their habitat due to their size and lack of natural predators. The common name 'pugolovka' is a Ukrainian word for tadpole.

== Description ==
Benthophilus granulosus has a flat head with a flat barbel on the chin that is often described as being leathery. The body colors depend on the habitat in which the fish lives. Benthophilus granulosus can be distinguished from its relatives by their body being covered in thorny granules which are closely compacted, containing three dark blotches on their midline. Benthophilus granulosus also has black dots on the head and back Granular pugolovka starts its life cycle off as a tadpole, this tadpole stage of life is identified by the body of this fish and the absence of scales. The body of the tadpole stage also is covered with variable sized bony portions protruding out of the body, which will eventually disappear in only the males who have reached sexual maturity.

== Habitat ==
Benthophilus granulosus lives in both brackish and fresh waters; low-salinity zones seem to be preferred. It prefers river deltas and estuaries as well as shallow coastal waters (0.5 to 20 metres (1.6 to 65.6 ft)) in the summer, and moves deeper (down to 70 metres (230 ft)) in the winter. Granular pugolovka is abundant along northern and eastern coasts around Ural and Volga rivers.

== Life cycle ==
Benthophilus granulosus has a life span of about a year, and reaches maturity at about 6–7 months. It spawns during April through July in shallow waters. Benthophilus granulosus starts life as a "tadpole" and matures into a goby fish. The granular pugolovka life cycle is about a year, which is normally how long it takes for their spawning season to start after their birth. The granular pugolovka all die shortly after spawning with the females dying before the males due to the more costly act of laying eggs as opposed to the males role of releasing sperm.

== Diet ==
Benthophilus granulosus is a bottom dweller and has a fairly limited diet or zoobenthos. They eat mysids, amphipods, bivalves, insects, and other foods.
