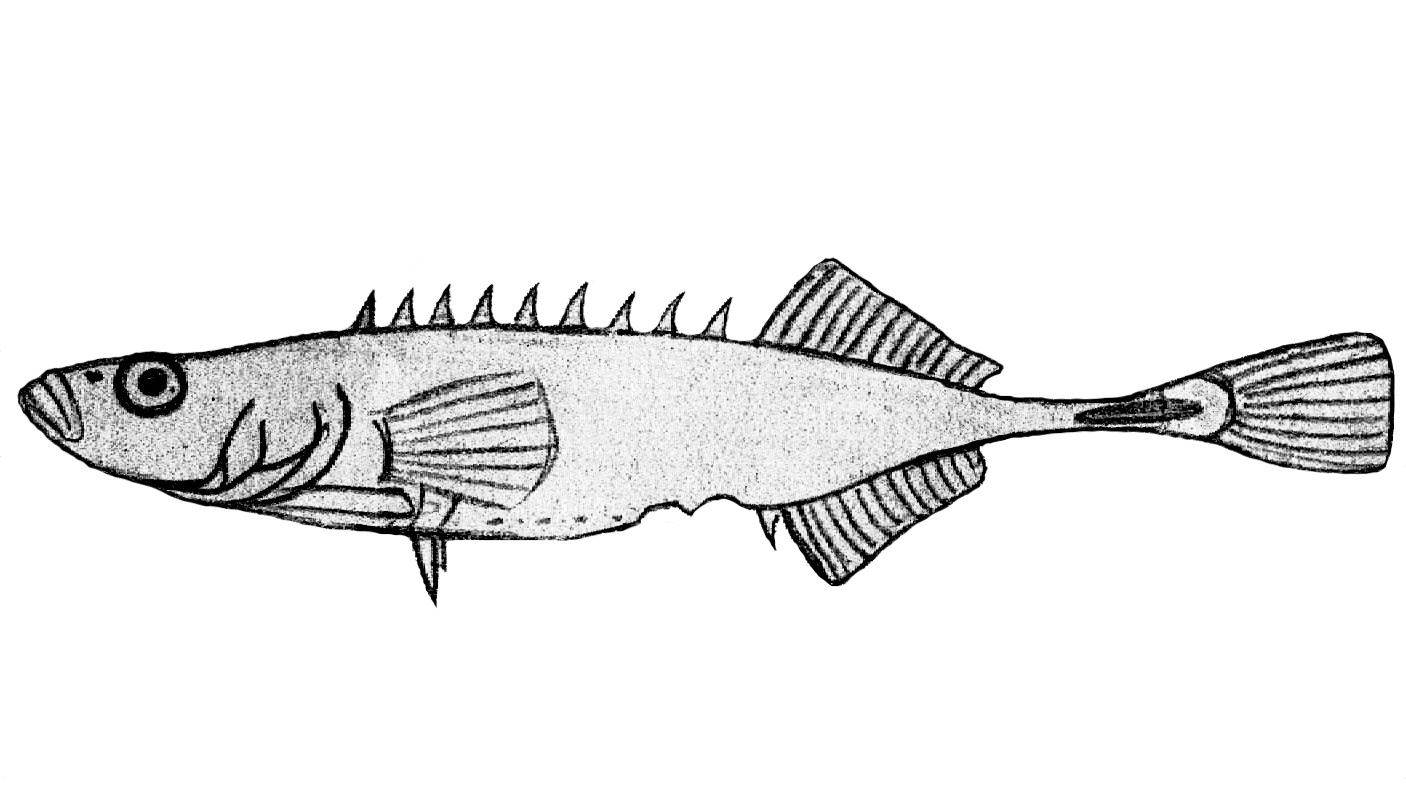

Conservation status
- Vulnerable (IUCN 3.1)

Scientific classification
- Kingdom: Animalia
- Phylum: Chordata
- Class: Actinopterygii
- Division: Teleostei
- Order: Perciformes
- Family: Gasterosteidae
- Genus: Pungitius
- Species: P. sinensis

Binomial name
- Pungitius sinensis (Guichenot, 1869)

Synonyms
- Gasterosteus sinensis Guichenot, 1869; Pungitius pungitius sinensis (Guichenot, 1869); Pungitius sinensis sinensis (Guichenot, 1869); Pygosteus pungitius sinensis (Guichenot, 1869); Pygosteus sinensis (Guichenot, 1869); Pygosteus kaibarae Tanaka, 1915; Pungitius kaibarae (Tanaka, 1915); Pungitius sinensis kaibarae (Tanaka, 1915)

= Amur stickleback =

Species of fish

The Amur stickleback (Pungitius sinensis) or gasigogi (Korean: 가시고기) is a species of fish in the family Gasterosteidae.

== Characteristics ==
This benthopelagic fish inhabits freshwater, brackish water, and marine environments, and typically reaches a length of around 6.5 cm (up to 9 cm), though some individuals can grow up to 9 cm. However, specimens found in Korea, particularly in the Namdaecheon stream in Gangwon Province, have been reported to reach lengths of up to 15 cm.

It is characterized by a series of sharp spines along its back, which serve as a defense mechanism. Its dorsal area is brown, while its ventral side is yellow.

== Ecology ==
It is widespread in East Asia: off the Korean Peninsula, northeast and north China, Japan, the Kuril Islands, the Kamchatka peninsula, and the basin of the Amur River. It shows a preference for clean freshwater habitats like the Namdaecheon stream, rather than saline marine waters.

During the breeding season, which lasts from April to August, male gasigogi construct nests using aquatic plants and leaves to attract females. After the female deposits her eggs, the male guards them diligently, aerating them with his pectoral fins by circulating fresh water. Remarkably, the male refrains from eating for about fifteen days during this period, focusing entirely on protecting and tending to the eggs.

== Use ==
In Korean cuisine, it is traditionally consumed grilled or used as an ingredient in soups.
