= Salvelinus andriashevi =

Scientific classification
- Kingdom: Animalia
- Phylum: Chordata
- Class: Actinopterygii
- Order: Salmoniformes
- Family: Salmonidae
- Genus: Salvelinus
- Species: S. andriashevi

Binomial name
- Salvelinus andriashevi Berg, 1948

Species of fish

Salvelinus andriashevi, also called the Chukot char, is a species of bony fish in the family Salmonidae. It is found only in Lake Istikhed, located on the southeastern Chukchi Peninsula in the Chukotka Autonomous Okrug of the Russian Federation. The fish grows up to 29.9 cm (11.8 in).
