= Sichel =

Sichel is a surname of German origin. Individuals with the name "Sichel" include:

- Alice Model, philanthropist born Alice Sichel
- Edith Helen Sichel, author
- Ernest Leopold Sichel, artist
- Frédéric Jules Sichel, established the first ophthalmic clinic in Paris; entomologist
- Herbert Sichel, statistician, developed the Sichel-t estimator and the Sichel distribution
- Jennifer Sichel, coxswain
- John Sichel, director
- Michael Sichel, fencer
- Peter Sichel, the CIA’s Distinguished Intelligence Medal recipient, created success of the once largest wine brand in the world
- Philip Sichel, early settler of Los Angeles and namesake of Los Angeles' Sichel Street
- Sebastián Sichel, Chilean politician and lawyer, born Sebastián Iglesias
- Walter Sichel, biographer and lawyer
- William Sichel, ultra marathon runner, has set 716 ultra running records as of 9/4/19

== See also ==
- Pelecus, a fish with multiple common names including "sichel"
- Seychelles
