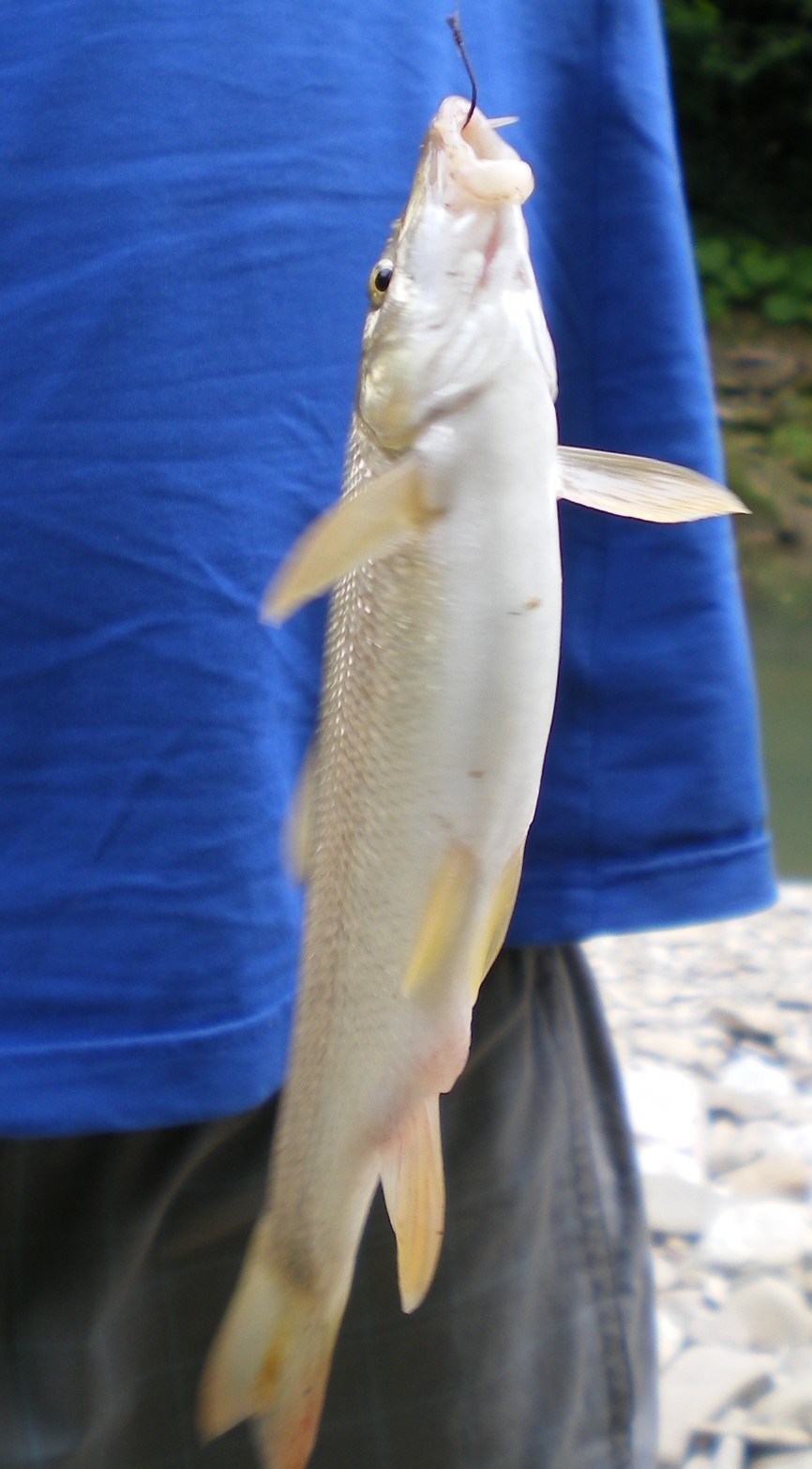

Conservation status
- Least Concern (IUCN 3.1)

Scientific classification
- Kingdom: Animalia
- Phylum: Chordata
- Class: Actinopterygii
- Order: Cypriniformes
- Family: Cyprinidae
- Subfamily: Barbinae
- Genus: Barbus
- Species: B. tauricus

Binomial name
- Barbus tauricus Kessler, 1877

= Crimean barbel =

Species of fish

The Crimean barbel (Barbus tauricus) is a species of ray-finned fish in the genus Barbus.
