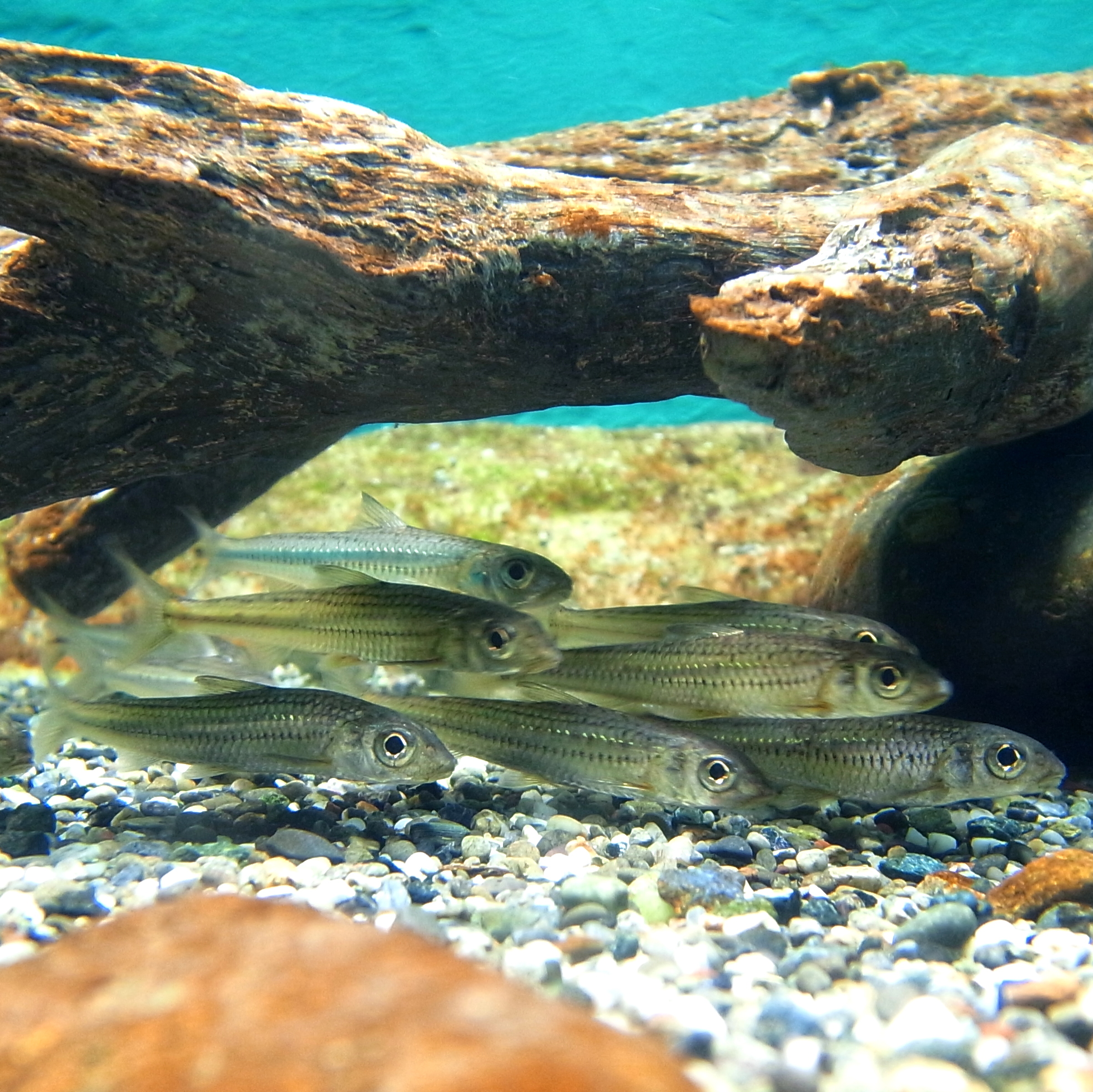
- Squalidus chankaensis biwae of Lake Biwa, Japan

Conservation status
- Least Concern (IUCN 3.1)

Scientific classification
- Kingdom: Animalia
- Phylum: Chordata
- Class: Actinopterygii
- Order: Cypriniformes
- Suborder: Cyprinoidei
- Family: Gobionidae
- Genus: Squalidus
- Species: S. chankaensis

Binomial name
- Squalidus chankaensis Dybowski, 1872

Synonyms
- Gnathopogon chankaensis (Dybowski, 1872); Gobio biwae D. S. Jordan & Snyder, 1900; Gnathopogon biwae (D. S. Jordan & Snyder, 1900); Gobio ussuriensis Berg, 1914

= Khanka gudgeon =

Species of fish

The Khanka gudgeon (Squalidus chankaensis) is a species of freshwater ray-finned fish belonging to the family Gobionidae, the gudgeons. This species is an East Asian freshwater fish that occurs from the Amur basin in Russia, through China, Mongolia and Japan, to Vietnam. It reaches up to 13.6 cm (5.4 in) in total length.
