= Salvelinus elgyticus =

Conservation status
- Least Concern (IUCN 3.1)

Scientific classification
- Kingdom: Animalia
- Phylum: Chordata
- Class: Actinopterygii
- Order: Salmoniformes
- Family: Salmonidae
- Genus: Salvelinus
- Species: S. elgyticus

Binomial name
- Salvelinus elgyticus (Viktorovsky & Glubokovsky, 1981)

Species of fish

Salvelinus elgyticus is a species of fish in the salmon family, Salmonidae. It is a member of genus Salvelinus, the chars. It is known commonly as the small-mouth char (Russian: малоротая палия). It is endemic to Lake Elgygytgyn in eastern Siberia in Russia.

== Description ==
It is a small char species, dark colored with light spots, reaching a maximum length of just over 23 centimetres (9.1 in). Little is known about its habits and life cycle.

== Biology ==
This cold water fish is named after its native lake, which is located in Chukotka, Russian Federation. This species and its relative, the long-finned char (Salvethymus svetovidovi) are limited to this remote lake, which is an impact crater. They are adapted to its very cold waters, which are generally just above the freezing point. The surface is frozen for about 10 months of the year. It may start to melt in the summer, but some years it never fully thaws. This fish spends most of the year in total darkness.

Salvelinus elgyticus is considered a threatened species by some authors, but it has not yet been evaluated by International Union for Conservation of Nature.
