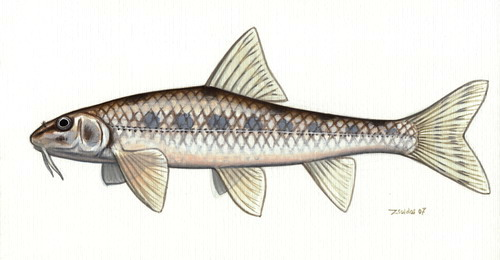

Conservation status
- Least Concern (IUCN 3.1)

Scientific classification
- Kingdom: Animalia
- Phylum: Chordata
- Class: Actinopterygii
- Order: Cypriniformes
- Suborder: Cyprinoidei
- Family: Gobionidae
- Genus: Romanogobio
- Species: R. albipinnatus

Binomial name
- Romanogobio albipinnatus (Lukasch, 1933)

Synonyms
- Gobio albipinnatus Lukasch, 1933

= White-finned gudgeon =

Species of fish

The white-finned gudgeon (Romanogobio albipinnatus) is a species of freshwater ray-finned fish belonging to the family Gobionidae, the gudgeons. It lives in the North Caspian basin in lower parts of the Volga and Ural River drainages. They can reach 13 cm in length.
