= Salvelinus jacuticus =

Yakutian char

Scientific classification
- Domain: Eukaryota
- Kingdom: Animalia
- Phylum: Chordata
- Class: Actinopterygii
- Order: Salmoniformes
- Family: Salmonidae
- Genus: Salvelinus
- Species: S. jacuticus

Binomial name
- Salvelinus jacuticus Borisov, 1935

Species of fish

Salvelinus jacuticus, commonly known as Yakutian char, is a species of freshwater fish in the salmon family. It is endemic to the mountain lakes in the Lena Delta, Russia. It was reported that the population of the species declined due to overfishing and the rise of temperature in the arctic region.

== Description ==
Yakutian char feed on the larvae and pupae of chironomid flies. The species may grow to a recorded length of 20cm (7.9 inches). The fish usually have a long dark grey body with orange spots on the sides. The species is benthopelagic, residing at or near the bottom of the lake.
