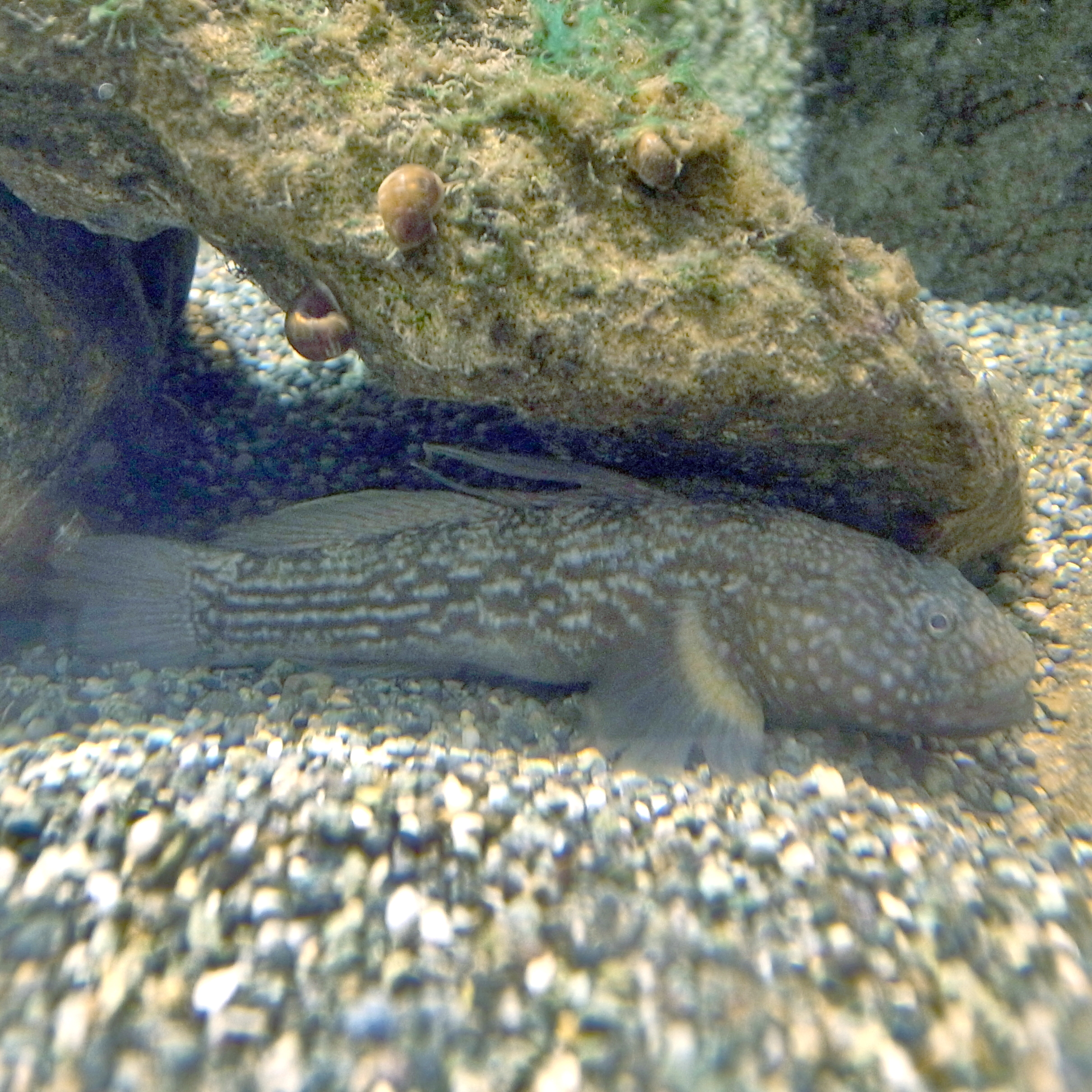

Scientific classification
- Kingdom: Animalia
- Phylum: Chordata
- Class: Actinopterygii
- Division: Teleostei
- Order: Gobiiformes
- Family: Oxudercidae
- Genus: Tridentiger
- Species: T. obscurus

Binomial name
- Tridentiger obscurus (Temminck & Schlegel, 1845)

Synonyms
- Sicydium obscurum Temminck & Schlegel, 1845; Tridentiger obscurus obscurus (Temminck & Schlegel, 1845)

= Dusky tripletooth goby =

Species of fish

The dusky tripletooth goby (Tridentiger obscurus) is a species of goby native to marine, fresh and brackish waters along the coasts of Korea and Japan. This species can reach a length of 14 centimetres (5.5 in) TL. This species is of minor importance to local commercial fisheries.
