= Volga undermouth =

Conservation status
- Least Concern (IUCN 3.1)

Scientific classification
- Kingdom: Animalia
- Phylum: Chordata
- Class: Actinopterygii
- Order: Cypriniformes
- Family: Leuciscidae
- Subfamily: Leuciscinae
- Genus: Chondrostoma
- Species: C. variabile

Binomial name
- Chondrostoma variabile Yakovlev, 1870

Species of fish

The Volga undermouth or Volga nase (Chondrostoma variabile) is a species of freshwater ray-finned fish belonging to the family Leuciscidae. This species is found in the Emba, Ural, and Volga drainages of the Caspian Sea basin and the Don River drainage of the Black Sea basin.

It is a riverine fish but is also found in reservoirs. The distribution is in lowland areas and foothills, and the fish prefer river stretches with strong currents, including rapids. Larvae and juveniles have a superior mouth, but at 3–4 months, they change to adult feeding mode (undermouth) and start grazing the bottom, eating benthic diatoms and detritus from the hard substrate. Breeding females deposit sticky eggs on gravel bottoms in shallow parts of rivers with moderate to strong currents.
