= Riverine goby =

Scientific classification
- Domain: Eukaryota
- Kingdom: Animalia
- Phylum: Chordata
- Class: Actinopterygii
- Order: Gobiiformes
- Family: Gobiidae
- Genus: Ponticola
- Species: P. rhodioni

Binomial name
- Ponticola rhodioni (Vasil'eva & Vasil'ev, 1994)

Synonyms
- Neogobius rhodioni Vasil'eva & Vasil'ev, 1994

Species of fish

The riverine goby (Ponticola rhodioni) is a species of gobiid fish native to rivers in the north-eastern part of the Black Sea basin at the border of Europe and Asia. It is one of the numerous species of benthophiline gobies endemic to the Ponto-Caspian region. It is known to occur in the basins of rivers north of the Bzyb Range and also in the Kuban River basin. This fish can be found in both fresh and brackish waters. It can reach a length of 14 centimetres (5.5 in) TL.
