= Ochetobius =

Conservation status
- Least Concern (IUCN 3.1)

Scientific classification
- Kingdom: Animalia
- Phylum: Chordata
- Class: Actinopterygii
- Order: Cypriniformes
- Family: Xenocyprididae
- Genus: Ochetobius; Günther, 1868
- Species: O. elongatus

Binomial name
- Ochetobius elongatus (Kner, 1867)

Synonyms
- Opsarius elongatus Kner, 1867; Agenigobio halsoueti Sauvage, 1878; Ochetobius lucens Jordan & Starks, 1905

Species of fish

Ochetobius is a monospecific genus of freshwater ray-finned fish belonging to the family Xenocyprididae, the East Asian minnows or sharpbellies. The only species in the genus is Ochetobius elongatus, a fish found in eastern Asia.
