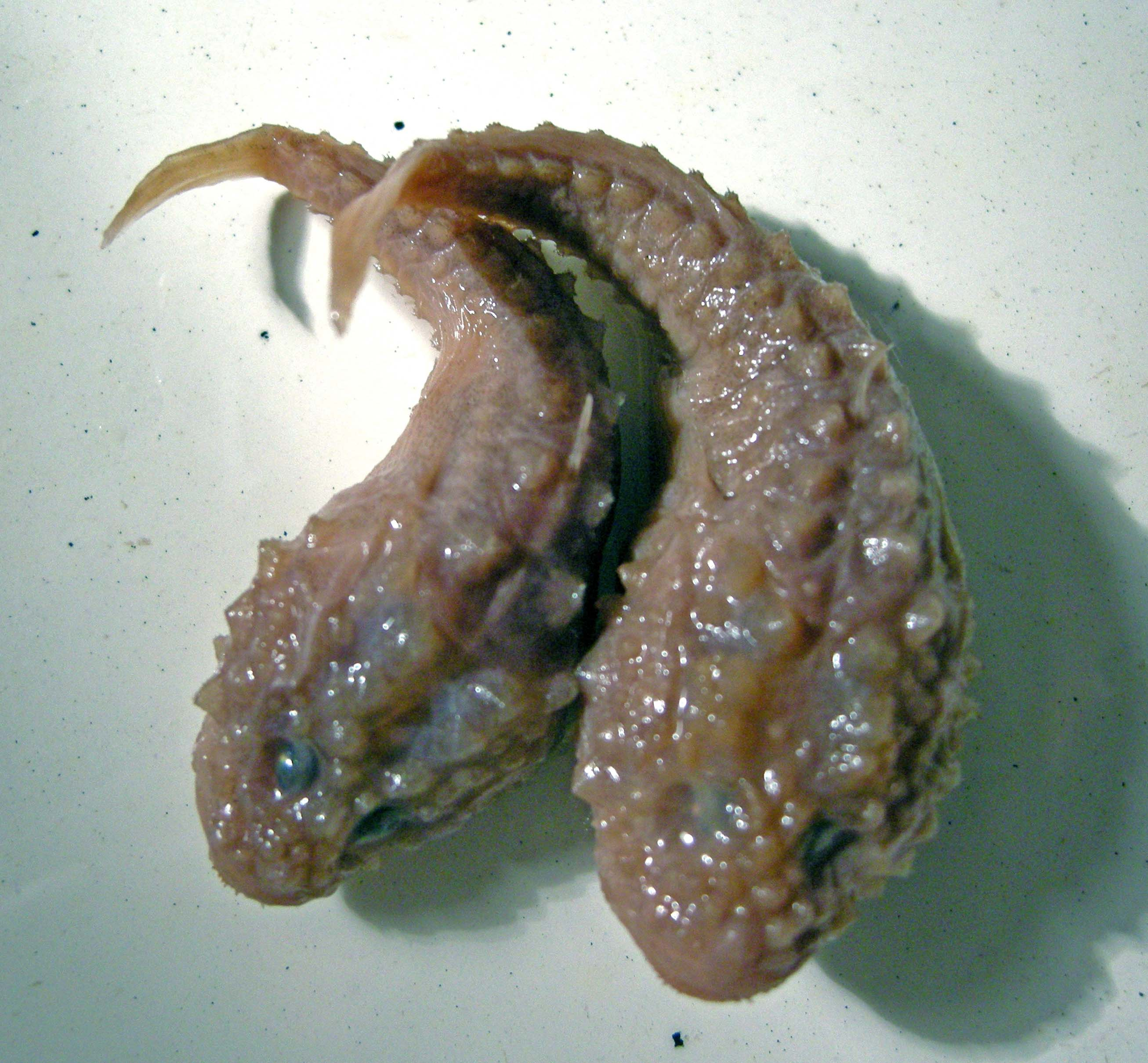

Scientific classification
- Domain: Eukaryota
- Kingdom: Animalia
- Phylum: Chordata
- Class: Actinopterygii
- Order: Gobiiformes
- Family: Gobiidae
- Genus: Benthophilus
- Species: B. baeri

Binomial name
- Benthophilus baeri Kessler, 1877
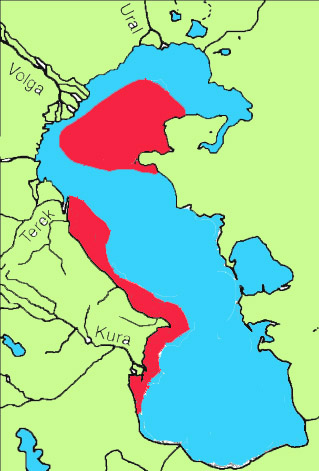
- The range of the Baer pugolovka

= Baer pugolovka =

Species of fish

The Baer pugolovka (Benthophilus baeri) is a species of goby widespread in the southern and central Caspian Sea, to Lenkoran in south. Also near the Chechen Island, Tyuleniy Islands, and in Bakhtemirovskaya Borozdina in north. This species occurs at depths of from 15 to 81 metres (49 to 266 ft). Males can reach a length of 8 centimetres (3.1 in) TL while females only reach 6 centimetres (2.4 in) TL.
