= Ladislavia =

Conservation status
- Least Concern (IUCN 3.1)

Scientific classification
- Kingdom: Animalia
- Phylum: Chordata
- Class: Actinopterygii
- Order: Cypriniformes
- Suborder: Cyprinoidei
- Family: Gobionidae
- Genus: Ladislavia; Dybowski, 1869
- Species: L. taczanowskii

Binomial name
- Ladislavia taczanowskii Dybowski, 1869

Species of fish

Ladislavia is a monospecific genus of freshwater ray-finned fish belonging to the family Gobionidae, the gudgeons. The only species in the genus is Ladislavia taczanowskii, the Taczanowski's gudgeon, which is found in the Yalu and Amur drainages in Eastern Asia. The specific name honours the Polish zoologist Władysław Taczanowski.
