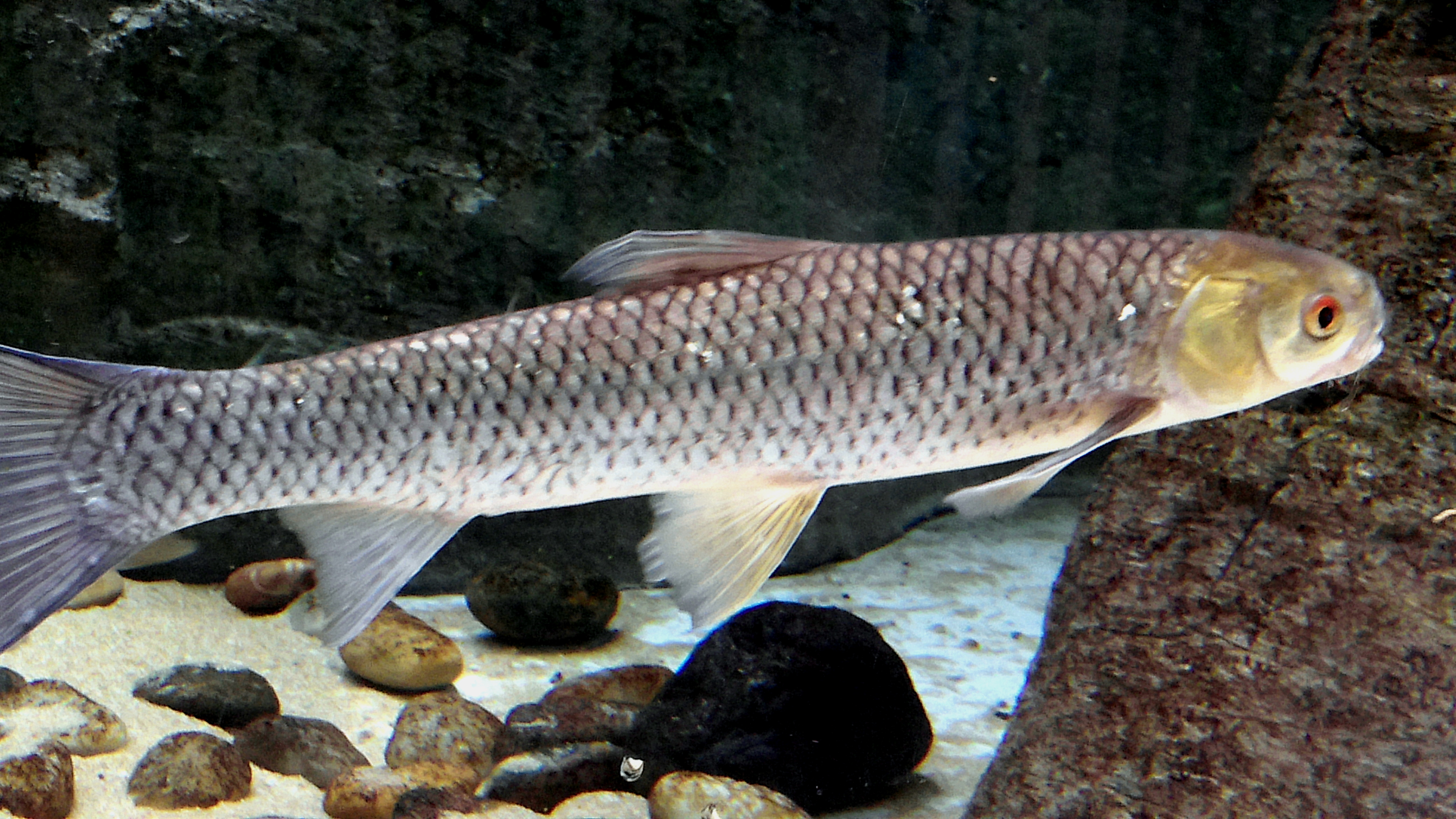

Conservation status
- Least Concern (IUCN 3.1)

Scientific classification
- Kingdom: Animalia
- Phylum: Chordata
- Class: Actinopterygii
- Order: Cypriniformes
- Family: Xenocyprididae
- Genus: Squaliobarbus; Günther, 1868
- Species: S. curriculus

Binomial name
- Squaliobarbus curriculus (J. Richardson, 1846)

Synonyms
- Leuciscus curriculus Richardson, 1846; Leuciscus teretiusculus Basilewsky, 1855; Squaliobarbus caudalis Sauvage, 1884; Squaliobarbus jordani Evermann & Shaw, 1927

= Barbel chub =

Species of fish

The barbel chub (Squaliobarbus curriculus) is a species of freshwater ray-finned fish belonging to the family Xenocyprididae/ which is found in China, North Korea, South Korea, eastern Russia, and Vietnam. It is the only member of the genus Squaliobarbus.

The standard length of a barbel chub is 40 to 350 mm (mean ± SD = 185.1 ± 53.4 mm). The standard weight ranges from 1.00 to 986.21 g (mean ± SD = 147.3 ± 127.0 g). Life expectancy for females is one to seven years while males live from one to six years.
