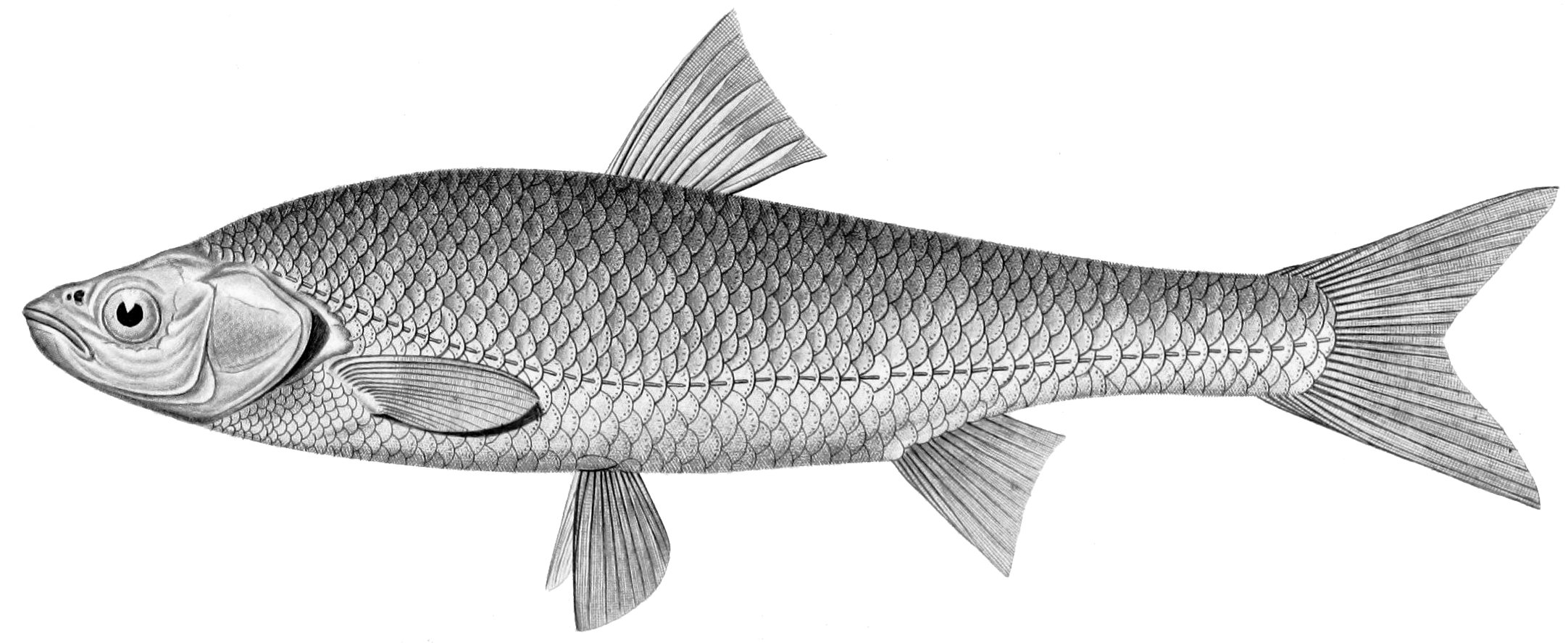

Conservation status
- Least Concern (IUCN 3.1)

Scientific classification
- Kingdom: Animalia
- Phylum: Chordata
- Class: Actinopterygii
- Order: Cypriniformes
- Family: Leuciscidae
- Subfamily: Leuciscinae
- Genus: Leuciscus
- Species: L. waleckii

Binomial name
- Leuciscus waleckii (Dybowski, 1869)

Synonyms
- Idus waleckii Dybowski, 1869; Leuciscus farnumi Fowler, 1899; Leuciscus waleckii sinensis Rendahl, 1925; Leuciscus mongolicus Oshima, 1926; Leuciscus brevirostris Mori, 1927; Leuciscus waleckii tumensis Mori, 1930; Leuciscus jeholi Howes, 1984

= Amur ide =

Species of fish

The Amur ide (Leuciscus waleckii). also known as Amur chebak is a species of freshwater ray-finned fish belonging to the family Leuciscidae. This species is found in the Amur River basin in Russia, Mongolia, China and Korea. The population found in Hulun Lake is capable of tolerating the very high levels of alkalinity in the lake. The transcriptome of the species has been sequenced in order to better understand this tolerance.
