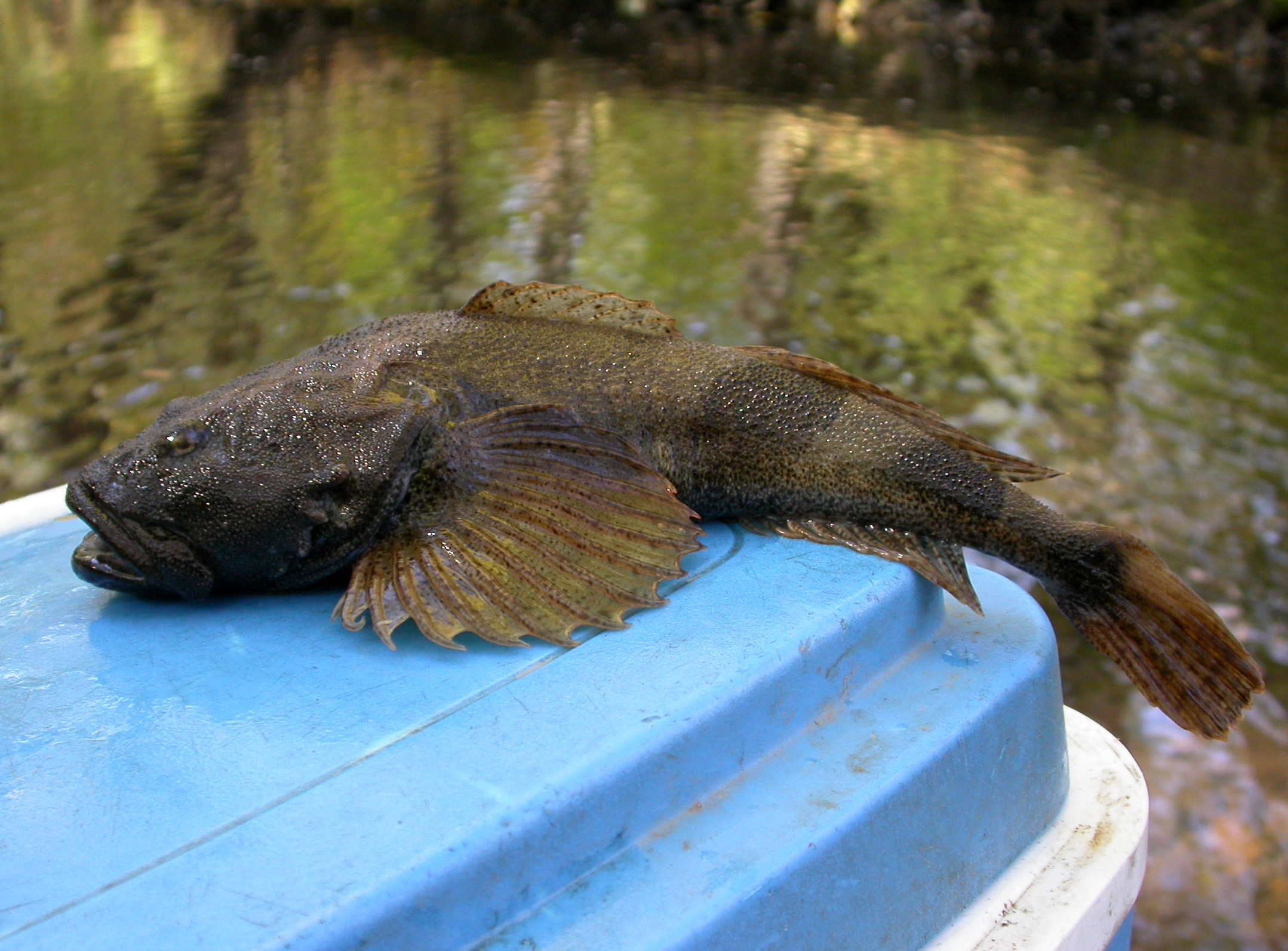

Conservation status
- Least Concern (IUCN 3.1)

Scientific classification
- Kingdom: Animalia
- Phylum: Chordata
- Class: Actinopterygii
- Division: Teleostei
- Order: Perciformes
- Suborder: Cottoidei
- Family: Cottidae
- Subfamily: Cottinae
- Genus: Mesocottus; Gratzianov, 1907
- Species: M. haitej

Binomial name
- Mesocottus haitej (Dybowski, 1869)

Synonyms
- Cottus haitej Dybowski, 1869

= Amur sculpin =

Species of fish

The Amur sculpin (Mesocottus haitej), also known as the Ussuri sculpin, is a species of freshwater ray-finned fish belonging to the family Cottidae, the typical sculpins. This species is found in eastern Asia where it is found in Russia, China and Mongolia - in the Amur River basin and some adjacent territories (the Tugur and the Uda Rivers flowing into the Sea of Okhotsk north from the Amur River, north-west of Sakhalin Island opposite the mouth of the Amur River). The Amur sculpin grows to a maximum published total length of 20 cm (7.9 in). This species is the only known member of its genus, Mesocottus. According to the result of a pilot phylogenetic analysis, the freshwater Mesocottus is a sister lineage to the Cottus clade.
