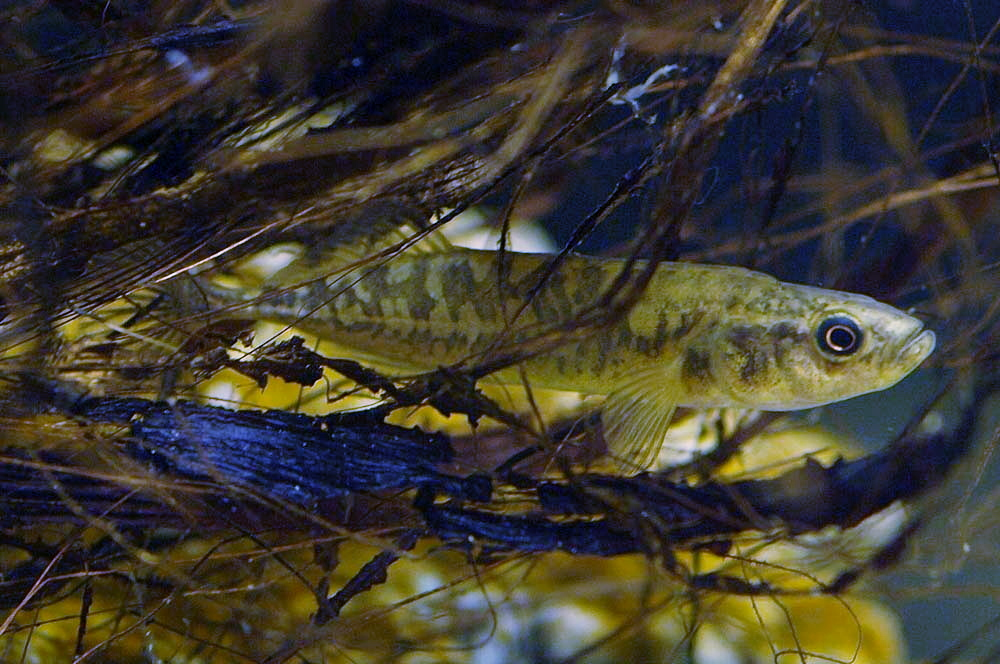
- Sakhalin stickleback (Pungitius tymensis)

Conservation status
- Data Deficient (IUCN 3.1)

Scientific classification
- Kingdom: Animalia
- Phylum: Chordata
- Class: Actinopterygii
- Order: Perciformes
- Family: Gasterosteidae
- Genus: Pungitius
- Species: P. tymensis

Binomial name
- Pungitius tymensis (A. M. Nikolskii, 1889)

Synonyms
- Gasterosteus tymensis A. M. Nikolskii, 1889; Pungitius pungitius tymensis (A. M. Nikolskii, 1889)

= Sakhalin stickleback =

Species of fish

The Sakhalin Stickleback (Pungitius tymensis) is a fish of the family Gasterosteidae. It is a freshwater benthopelagic fish, that grows up to 7.0 cm in length. It is endemic to the islands of Hokkaido and Sakhalin.
