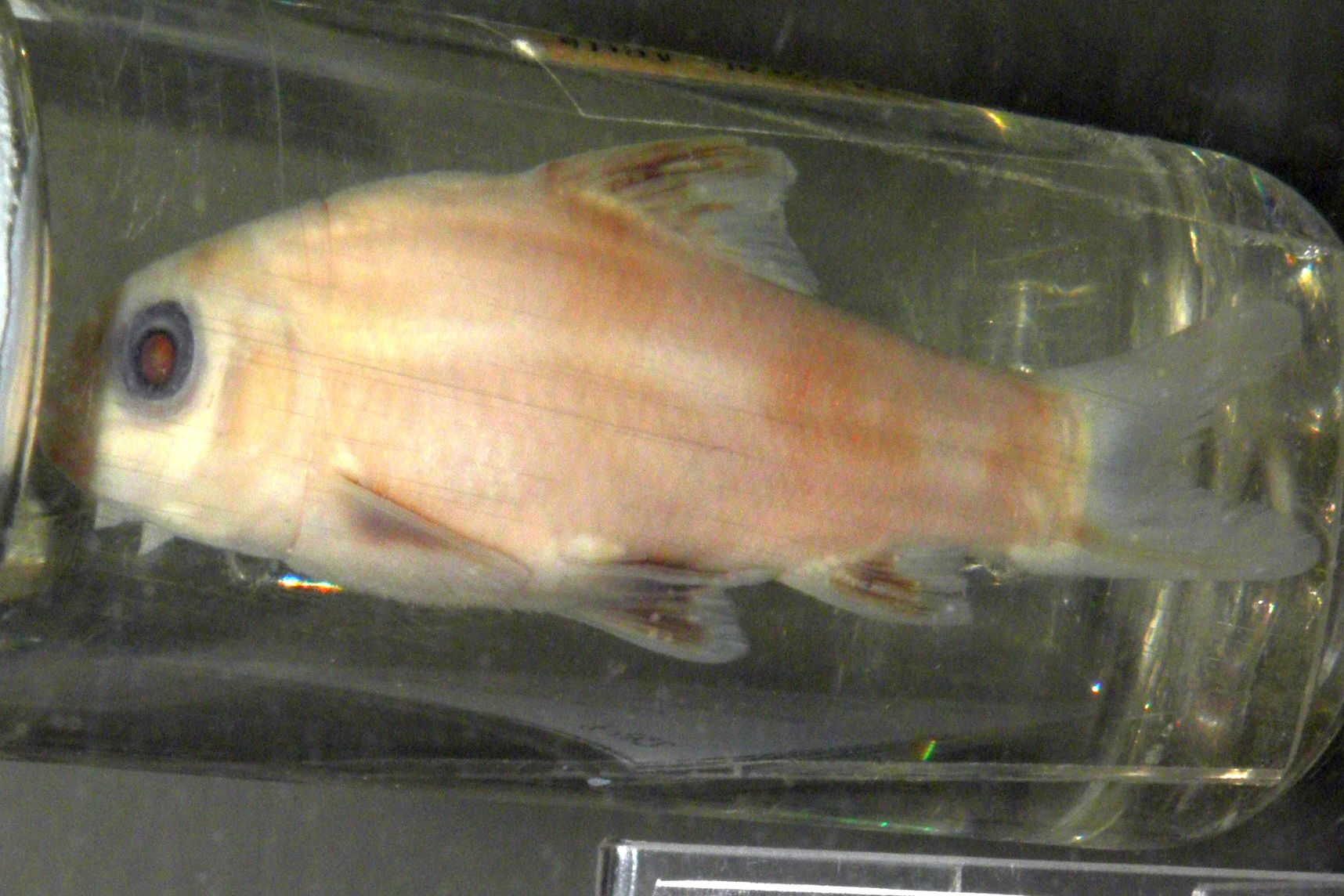
- Faded museum specimen (living individuals have blackish markings, often appearing as distinct bands)

Conservation status
- Least Concern (IUCN 3.1)

Scientific classification
- Kingdom: Animalia
- Phylum: Chordata
- Class: Actinopterygii
- Order: Cypriniformes
- Suborder: Cyprinoidei
- Family: Gobionidae
- Genus: Sarcocheilichthys
- Species: S. sinensis

Binomial name
- Sarcocheilichthys sinensis Bleeker, 1871

= Chinese lake gudgeon =

Species of fish

Chinese lake gudgeon (Sarcocheilichthys sinensis) is a species of freshwater ray-finned fish belonging to the family Gobionidae, the gudgeons. This species is found in various freshwater habitats with little current from the Amur basin to Korea and China.
