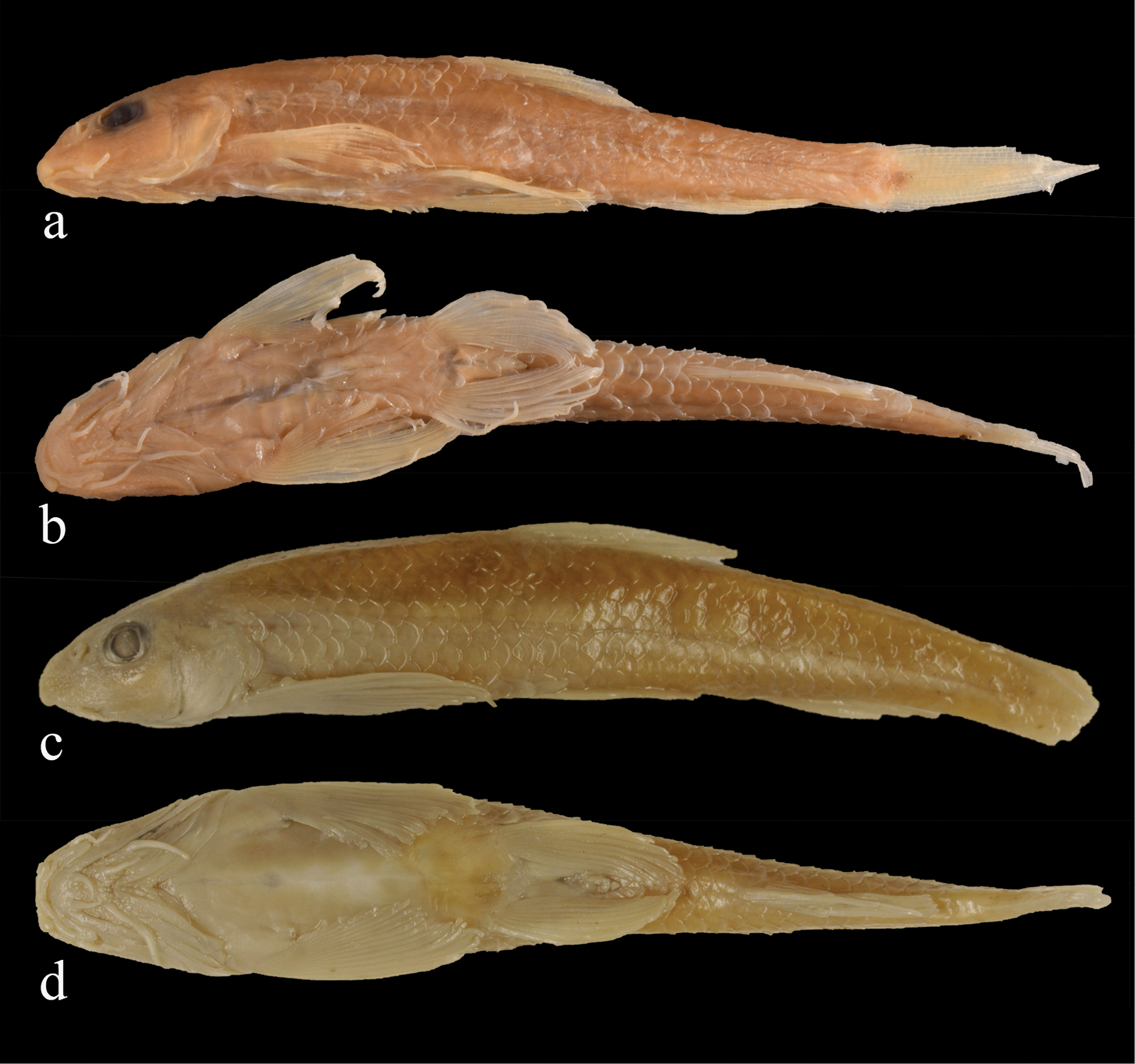

Conservation status
- Least Concern (IUCN 3.1)

Scientific classification
- Kingdom: Animalia
- Phylum: Chordata
- Class: Actinopterygii
- Order: Cypriniformes
- Suborder: Cyprinoidei
- Family: Gobionidae
- Genus: Gobiobotia
- Species: G. pappenheimi

Binomial name
- Gobiobotia pappenheimi Kreyenberg, 1911

= Eightbarbel gudgeon =

Species of freshwater fish from Asia

The eightbarbel gudgeon (Gobiobotia pappenheimi) is a species of small freshwater ray-finned fish belonging to the family Gobionidae, the gudgeons. It is found in the Yangtze and Amur basins in Asia.

== Morphology ==
Males can reach 6.3 cm in total length.
