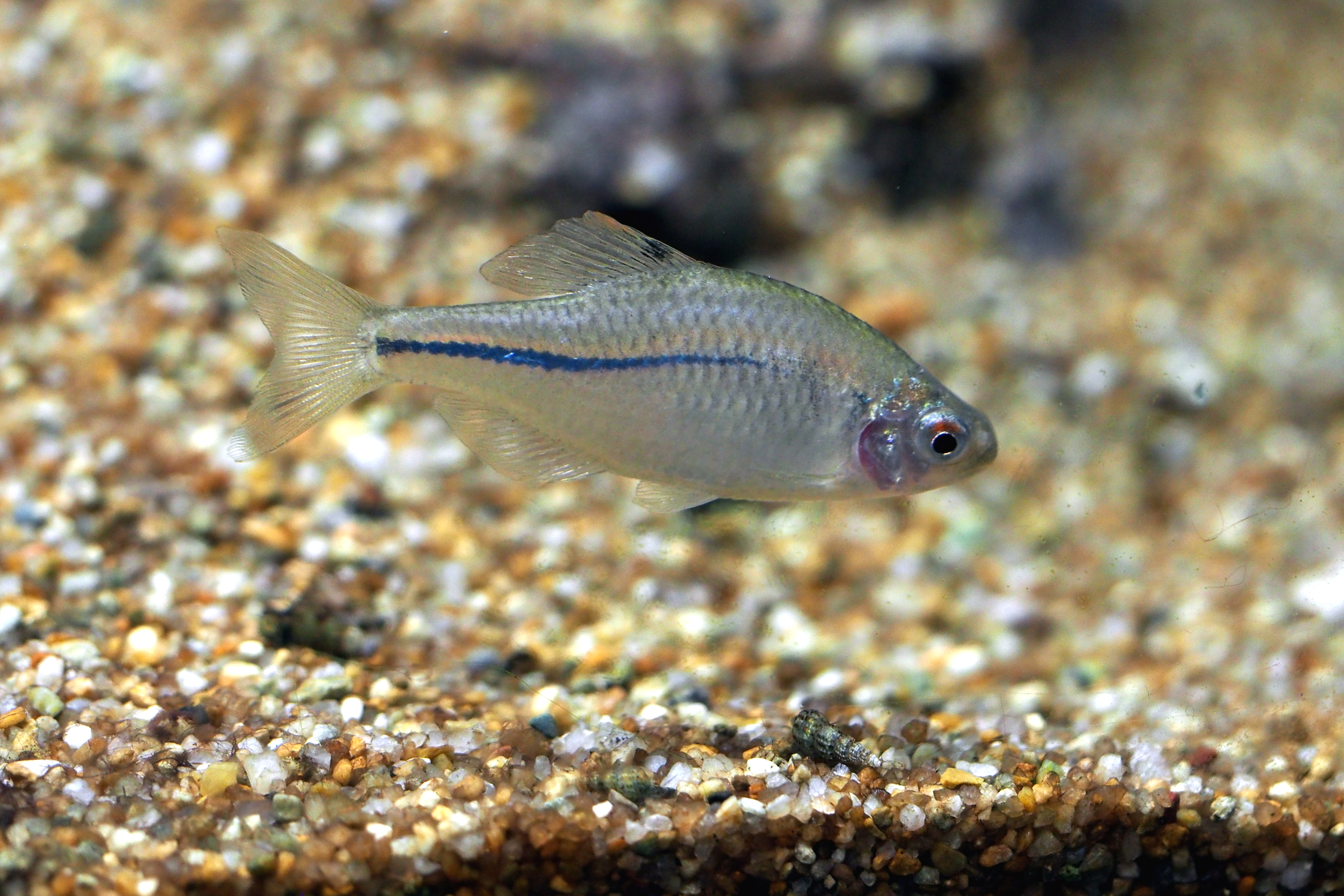

Conservation status
- Least Concern (IUCN 3.1)

Scientific classification
- Kingdom: Animalia
- Phylum: Chordata
- Class: Actinopterygii
- Order: Cypriniformes
- Suborder: Cyprinoidei
- Family: Acheilognathidae
- Genus: Rhodeus
- Species: R. lighti

Binomial name
- Rhodeus lighti (H. W. Wu, 1931)

Synonyms
- Pseudoperilampus lighti H.W Wu, 1931

= Light's bitterling =

Species of fish

Light's bitterling (Rhodeus lighti) is a temperate freshwater ray-finned fish belonging to the family Acheilognathidae, the bitterlings. It originates in Russia and China, from the Amur River basin to southern China. It was originally described as Pseudoperilampus lighti by H.W. Wu in 1931.

The fish is named in honor of zoologist S. F. Light (1886–1947), University of California, Berkeley, for his "constant help and encouragement" in Wu's zoological studies during their three-year association at the University of Amoy (now Xiamen University).

The fish reaches a length up to 7.2 cm (2.8 in), and is native to freshwater habitats with a temperature of 10 to 25 °C (50 to 77 °F). When spawning, the females deposit their eggs inside bivalves, where they hatch and the young remain in the bivalves until they can swim.
