= Cottus =

Cottus may refer to:

- Cottus, one of the Hecatoncheires of Greek mythology
- Cottus (fish), a genus of sculpin fish
