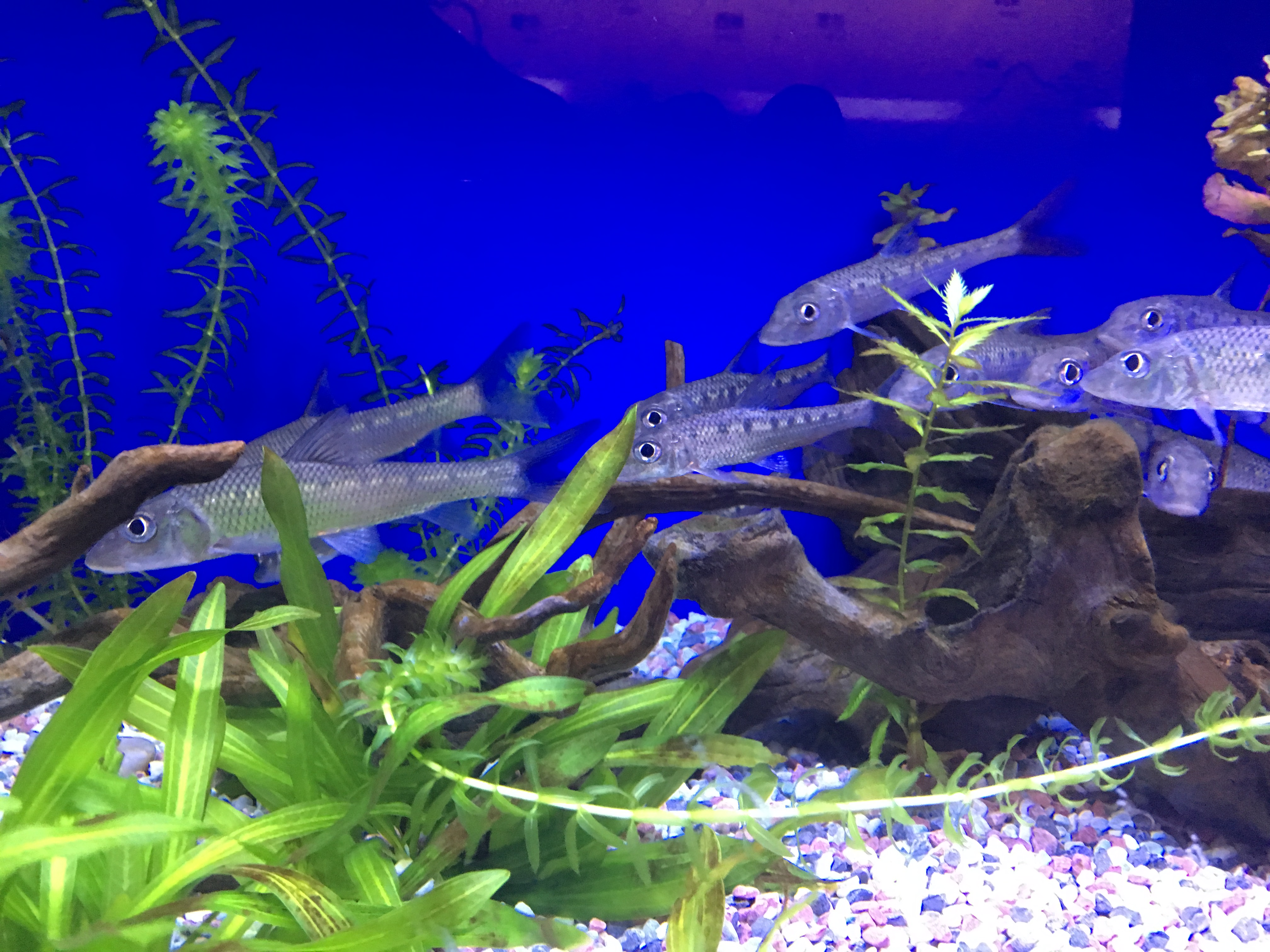

Conservation status
- Least Concern (IUCN 3.1)

Scientific classification
- Kingdom: Animalia
- Phylum: Chordata
- Class: Actinopterygii
- Order: Cypriniformes
- Suborder: Cyprinoidei
- Family: Gobionidae
- Genus: Hemibarbus
- Species: H. maculatus

Binomial name
- Hemibarbus maculatus Bleeker, 1871

Synonyms
- Barbus semibarbus Günther, 1889; Hemibarbus joiteni D. S. Jordan & Starks, 1904; Acanthogobio paltschevskii Nikolskii, 1904; Hemibarbus longibarbis P.-W. Weng, 1938

= Spotted steed =

Species of fish

The spotted steed (Hemibarbus maculatus) is a species of small freshwater fish in the family Cyprinidae. It is found throughout the Amur basin in eastern Asia to China, the Korean peninsula, and Japan. The generic name, Hemibarbus, is a combination of Ancient Greek hemi, meaning "half", and Barbus, which is another cyprinid genus. The specific name, maculatus, means "spotted" in latin.

== Taxonomy and classification ==
The spotted steed is a ray-finned fish in the family Gobionidae, this is classified within the suborder Cyprinoidei of the order Cypriniformes.

== Identification and characteristics ==
The spotted steed can be distinguished from similar species through various physical and behavioral characteristics. The spotted steed has 7-11 large blackish spots on each flank, underdeveloped lips, and their dorsal fin is closer to the tip of their snout than to their caudal-fin base. Also, they have six and a half branched anal-fin rays.

== Diet ==
The spotted steed is known to feed on benthic crustaceans, insects and molluscs. They have been recorded to feed mainly on insects and molluscs during the summer and crustaceans during the winter.

== Reproduction and lifecycle ==
The spotted steed becomes mature at 3 years of age, naturally breeding during May and June, Their eggs are deposited among aquatic vegetation and develop in approximately four days, and the larvae live in the pelagic stage for their first six days of life.

== Range ==
The spotted steed is native to China, Korea, Japan and the Amur basin, but it has been introduced to various other countries and regions. For example, it is believed to have invaded the freshwater habitats of some lakes and rivers of Russia (then a part of the USSR) due to an accidental introduction in 1988 along with Chinese carp fry from the Yangtze River. The spotted steed has also been intentionally introduced in certain Asian countries, and so as a result, it can currently also been found in Cambodia, Laos, Mongolia (where it is widely distributed in Lake Buir and Rivers Onon, Kherlen, and Khalkhiin), Uzbekistan, and Vietnam.

== Ecological role ==
The spotted steed has been recorded to be a serious competitor and threat to the native benthic fish where it is introduced, and this is especially true when it was introduced into the former USSR. Some impacts this species has had on habitats include causing habitat alteration, modification of natural benthic communities, negatively impacting aquaculture and fisheries, causing a reduction in native biodiversity, and engaging in competition with native species. The spotted steed is an excellent invader due to its rapid growth rate and higher fecundity than native fish species. Within its native ecosystem it engages in competition, however, it does not have as strong of an effect on other species as it does in the habitats it invades.

== Factors in establishment ==
Some factors that are known to influence the successful establishment of the spotted steed are its high fecundity and rapid growth rate. The species also has a very non-specific diet that consists of snails, aquatic insects, clams, and small fish. As such, it is able to obtain its resources easier than other species with more specific diets. These factors aid in the species ability to invade other habitats.
