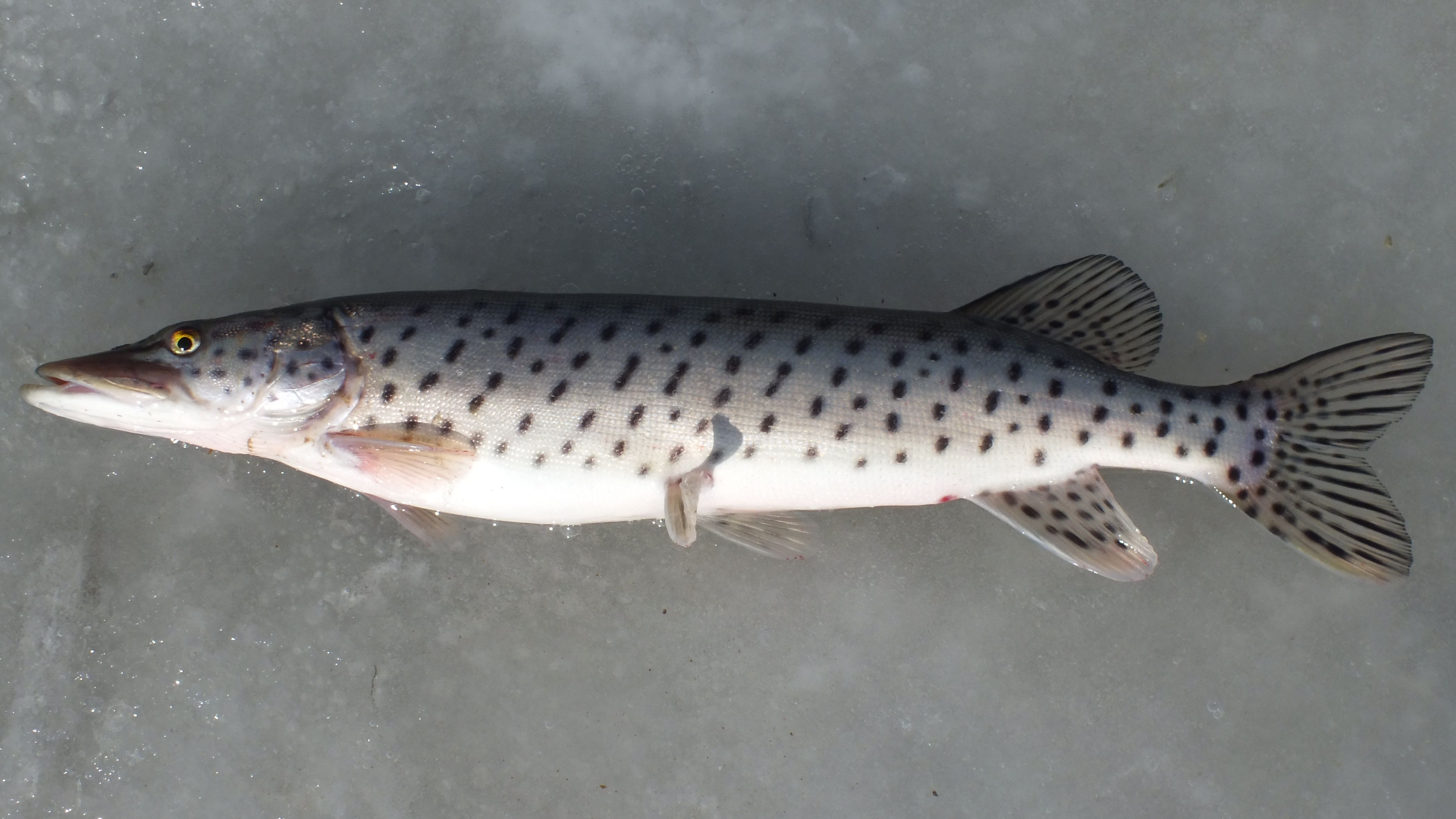

Conservation status
- Least Concern (IUCN 3.1)

Scientific classification
- Kingdom: Animalia
- Phylum: Chordata
- Class: Actinopterygii
- Order: Salmoniformes
- Family: Esocidae
- Genus: Esox
- Species: E. reichertii

Binomial name
- Esox reichertii (Dybowski, 1869)

= Amur pike =

Species of fish

The Amur pike (Esox reichertii), also known as the blackspotted pike, is a pike native to the Amur River system in east Asia, as well as freshwater habitat on the island of Sakhalin. Closely related to the northern pike, it reaches a length of 115 cm (3 ft 9 in), a weight of 12.5 kg (28 lb), sporting a silvery body with small, black spots. Like other pike, this species is prized for sport fishing.

It is not commonly found outside its native range. However, it was introduced to Glendale Lake, Cambria County, Pennsylvania (United States), by the Pennsylvania Fish and Boat Commission (PFBC) in 1968. The lake is just south of the native range of the northern pike. Pure Amur pike were last spawned in 1971. All of the Pennsylvania Fish Commission's brood stock was lost in the summer of 1976. That same year the world record Amur pike was caught from the lake. The year after, the PFBC also stocked 168 northern pike x Amur pike hybrids into the lake. With a lack of success, the Amur pike program was cancelled. Glendale Lake was chosen because its outflow leads into heavily polluted waters in which fish cannot survive. Pure northern pike are found in the lake today, however it is likely no pure or hybrid Amur pike remain.

Some Amur pike escaped from the Benner Spring Fish Hatchery where the original eggs and subsequent brood stock were hatched and kept. The hatchery is in the Delaware River watershed, so it's possible Amur pike could be present in that river system. However, none have ever been caught and no signs of reproduction of Amur pike in the wild in America has been documented, even in Glendale Lake.
