= Amur whitefin gudgeon =

Scientific classification
- Kingdom: Animalia
- Phylum: Chordata
- Class: Actinopterygii
- Order: Cypriniformes
- Suborder: Cyprinoidei
- Family: Gobionidae
- Genus: Romanogobio
- Species: R. tenuicorpus

Binomial name
- Romanogobio tenuicorpus (Mori, 1934)

Synonyms
- Gobio albipinnatus tenuicorpus; Gobio coriparoides tenuicorpus; Gobio gobio tenuicorpus; Gobio tenuicorpus

Species of fish

The Amur whitefin gudgeon (Romanogobio tenuicorpus) s a species of freshwater ray-finned fish belonging to the family Gobionidae, the gudgeons. This fish is found in the Amur and Luang Ho drainages.

This species reaches a length of 25.6 cm (10.1 in).
