= Long-nosed gudgeon =

Conservation status
- Near Threatened (IUCN 3.1)

Scientific classification
- Kingdom: Animalia
- Phylum: Chordata
- Class: Actinopterygii
- Order: Cypriniformes
- Suborder: Cyprinoidei
- Family: Gobionidae
- Genus: Microphysogobio
- Species: M. tungtingensis

Binomial name
- Microphysogobio tungtingensis (Nichols, 1926)

Synonyms
- Pseudogobio tungtingensis Nichols, 1926; Abbottina elongata Yao & Yang, 1977; Microphysogobio elongatus (Yao & Yang, 1977)

Species of fish

The long-nosed gudgeon (Microphysogobio tungtingensis) is a species of freshwater ray-finned fish belonging to the family Gobionidae, the gudgeons. This species is endemic to China.
