= Smallscale yellowfin =

Conservation status
- Least Concern (IUCN 3.1)

Scientific classification
- Kingdom: Animalia
- Phylum: Chordata
- Class: Actinopterygii
- Order: Cypriniformes
- Suborder: Cyprinoidei
- Family: Xenocyprididae
- Genus: Plagiognathops; Berg, 1907
- Species: P. microlepis

Binomial name
- Plagiognathops microlepis (Bleeker, 1871)

Synonyms
- Genus: Plagiognathus Dybowski, 1872; Species: Xenocypris microlepis Bleeker, 1871; Plagiognathus jelskii Dybowski, 1872

Species of fish

The smallscale yellowfin (Plagiognathops microlepis) is a species of freshwater ray-finned fish belonging to the family Xenocyprididae, the East Asian minnows or sharpbellies. This species is found from the southern part of the Amur drainage systems, including the Ussuri and Lake Khanka, and along the major river drainages of China south to the Xi River in southwestern China and northern Viet Nam. The smallscale yellowfin has a maximum published total length of 70 cm (28 in). This species was first formally described in 1872 as Plagiognathus jelskii by the Polish naturalist and physician Benedykt Dybowski with its type locality given as Lake Khanka and the Ussuri River. Dybowski's genus name was objectively invalid as it was preoccupied by Plagiognathus Fieber, 1858 in Hemiptera and in 1907 Lev Berg proposed the genus name Plagiognathops for this taxon.
