= White Amur bream =

Conservation status
- Least Concern (IUCN 3.1)

Scientific classification
- Kingdom: Animalia
- Phylum: Chordata
- Class: Actinopterygii
- Order: Cypriniformes
- Suborder: Cyprinoidei
- Family: Xenocyprididae
- Genus: Parabramis; Bleeker, 1865
- Species: P. pekinensis

Binomial name
- Parabramis pekinensis (Basilewsky, 1855)

Synonyms
- Leuciscus bramula Valenciennes in Cuvier & Valenciennes, 1844; Leuciscus rhomboidalis Valenciennes in Cuvier & Valenciennes, 1844; Abramis pekinensis Basilewsky, 1855; Megalobrama skolkovii var. carinatus Dybowski, 1872; Chanodichthys stenzii Popta, 1907; Parabramis liaohonensis Yih & Wu, 1964; Parabramis pekinensis f. strenosomus Yu, Xie & Yih, 1959

Species of fish

The white Amur bream (Parabramis pekinensis) is a species of freshwater ray-finned fish belonging to the family Xenocyprididae, the East Asian minnows or sharpbellies This is the only species in the monospecific genus Parabramis. It is native to eastern Asia, where found from the Amur River basin in Russia south to Ningbo and Shanghai in China. It is an important food fish, and has been introduced to regions outside its native range.

The species was originally described as Abramis pekinensis by the Russian physician, zoologist and ichthyologist Stepan Ivanovich Basilewsky with its type locality given as the rivers flowing into Tschili Bay. In 1865 Pieter Bleeker proposed the monotypic genus Parabramis for this taxon. The genus name is derived from the Greek word para, meaning "the side of ", and the Old French word breme, a type of freshwater fish.
