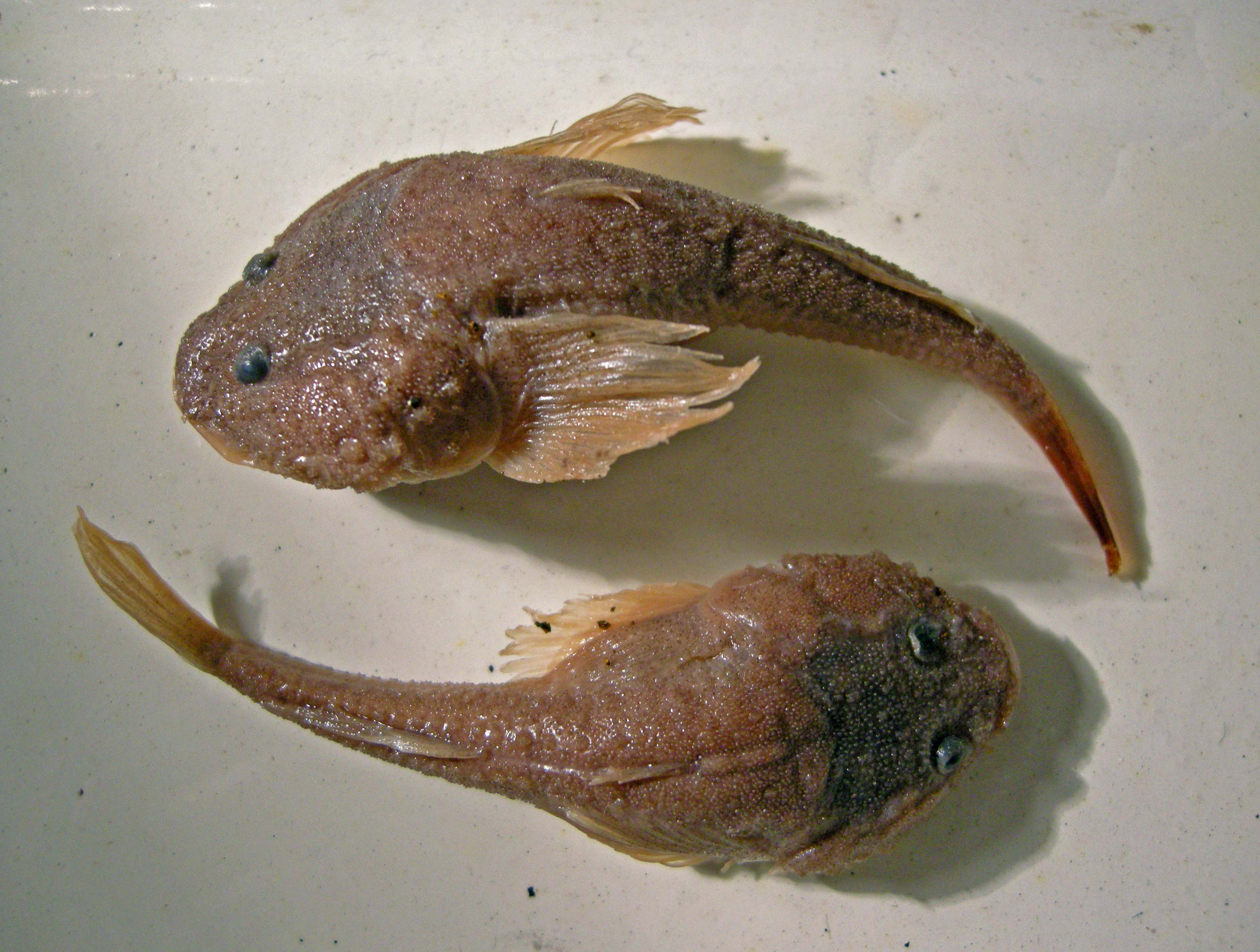

Conservation status
- Least Concern (IUCN 3.1)

Scientific classification
- Kingdom: Animalia
- Phylum: Chordata
- Class: Actinopterygii
- Order: Gobiiformes
- Family: Gobiidae
- Genus: Benthophilus
- Species: B. macrocephalus

Binomial name
- Benthophilus macrocephalus (Pallas, 1787)
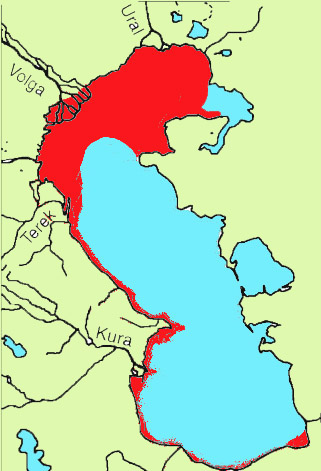
- The range of the Caspian tadpole goby

Synonyms
- Gobius macrocephalus Pallas, 1787

= Caspian tadpole goby =

Species of fish

The Caspian tadpole goby (Benthophilus macrocephalus) is a species of goby which is widespread in the basin of the Caspian Sea, specifically in the near-estuary zone of the rivers and in small bays. It is a common species in the Volga River delta near Astrakhan, occurred in the deltas of rivers Terek, Ural, Samur. During the warmer months, this species prefers to live at depths of from .5 to 10 metres (1.6 to 32.8 ft), moving in the colder months to depths of 20 to 25 metres (66 to 82 ft). It can reach a length of 11.6 centimetres (4.6 in) TL.
