= Short-headed sculpin =

Conservation status
- Least Concern (IUCN 3.1)

Scientific classification
- Kingdom: Animalia
- Phylum: Chordata
- Class: Actinopterygii
- Order: Perciformes
- Suborder: Cottoidei
- Superfamily: Cottoidea
- Family: Cottidae
- Genus: Cottinella; Berg, 1907
- Species: C. boulengeri

Binomial name
- Cottinella boulengeri (Berg, 1906)

Synonyms
- Abyssocottus boulengeri Berg, 1906

Species of fish

The short-headed sculpin (Cottinella boulengeri) is a species of ray-finned fish belonging to the family Cottidae, the typical sculpins. This species is endemic to Lake Baikal in Russia. It lives at depths of from 400 to 1,600 metres (1,310 to 5,250 ft), and is not longer than 12.2 centimetres (4.8 in) TL. This species is the only known member of its genus.
