= Terek barbel =

Conservation status
- Least Concern (IUCN 3.1)

Scientific classification
- Kingdom: Animalia
- Phylum: Chordata
- Class: Actinopterygii
- Order: Cypriniformes
- Family: Cyprinidae
- Genus: Barbus
- Species: B. ciscaucasicus

Binomial name
- Barbus ciscaucasicus Kessler, 1877

Species of fish

The Terek barbel (Barbus ciscaucasicus) is a species of ray-finned fish in the genus Barbus which is found in the western drainage basin of the Caspian Sea from the Terek basin to the Samur basin in Dagestan, Georgia and Azerbaijan.
