= Chinese lizard gudgeon =

Conservation status
- Least Concern (IUCN 3.1)

Scientific classification
- Kingdom: Animalia
- Phylum: Chordata
- Class: Actinopterygii
- Order: Cypriniformes
- Suborder: Cyprinoidei
- Family: Gobionidae
- Genus: Saurogobio
- Species: S. dabryi

Binomial name
- Saurogobio dabryi Bleeker, 1871

Synonyms
- Gobiosoma amurensis Dybowski, 1872; Pseudogobio productus Peters, 1881; Longurio athymius D. S. Jordan & Starks, 1905; Pseudogobio drakei Abbot, 1901; Saurogobio longirostris H.-W. Wu & K.-F. Wang, 1931: Saurogobio dabryi chenghaiensis Y.-G. Dai & J.-X. Yang, 2002

Species of fish

The Chinese lizard gudgeon (Saurogobio dabryi) is a species of freshwater ray-finned fish belonging to the family Gobionidae, the gudgeons. found in the Amur basin to the Pearl River in China, Mongolia and the Korean peninsula. It is also found in Vietnam.

== Etymology ==
Named in honor of Pierre Dabry de Thiersant (1826-1898), fish culturist, French counsel to China, and student of Chinese fishes, who sent specimens to the Muséum d'Histoire naturelle de Paris.
