= Kuban long-barbelled gudgeon =

Conservation status
- Least Concern (IUCN 3.1)

Scientific classification
- Kingdom: Animalia
- Phylum: Chordata
- Class: Actinopterygii
- Order: Cypriniformes
- Suborder: Cyprinoidei
- Family: Gobionidae
- Genus: Romanogobio
- Species: R. pentatrichus

Binomial name
- Romanogobio pentatrichus Naseka & Bogutskaya, 1998

Species of fish

The Kuban long-barbelled gudgeon (Romanogobio pentatrichus) is a species of freshwater ray-finned fish belonging to the family Gobionidae, the gudgeons. It is endemic to the middle reaches of the Kuban River in Russia.

This species reaches a length of 13.0 cm (5.1 in).
