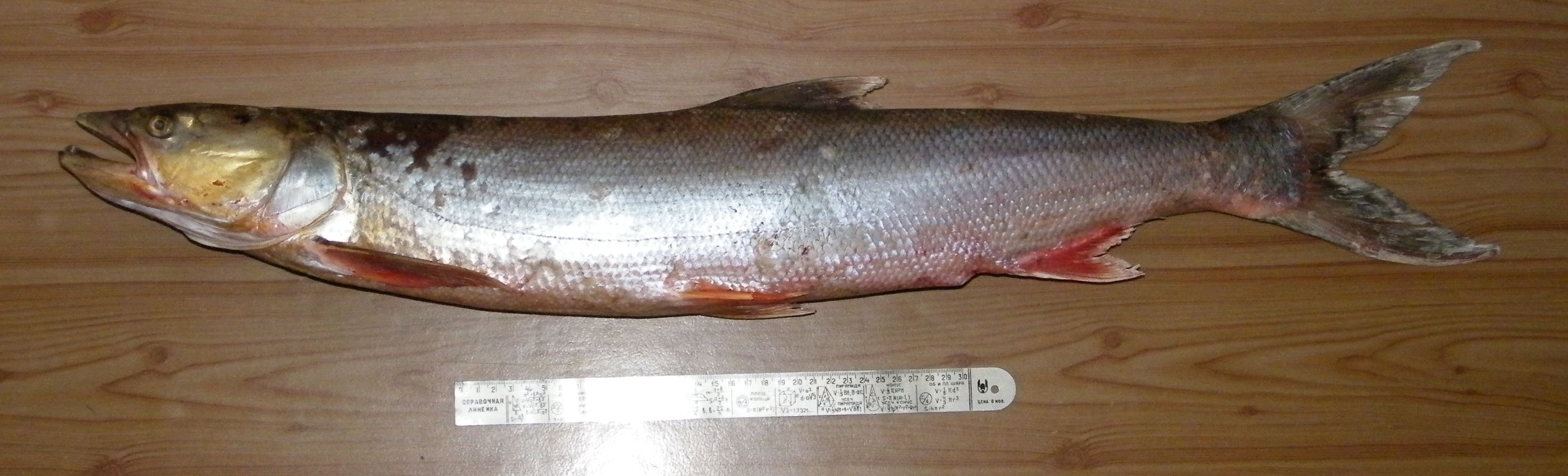

Conservation status
- Least Concern (IUCN 3.1)

Scientific classification
- Kingdom: Animalia
- Phylum: Chordata
- Class: Actinopterygii
- Division: Teleostei
- Order: Cypriniformes
- Family: Xenocyprididae
- Genus: Elopichthys; Bleeker, 1860
- Species: E. bambusa

Binomial name
- Elopichthys bambusa (J. Richardson, 1845)

Synonyms
- Genus: Gymnognathus Sauvage, 1884; Scombrocypris Günther, 1889; Species: Leuciscus bambusa J. Richardson, 1845; Nasus dahuricus Basilewsky, 1855; Elopichthys dahuricus (Basilewsky, 1855); Gymnognathus harmandi Sauvage, 1884; Scombrocypris styani Günther, 1889

= Elopichthys =

Species of fish

Elopichthys is a monospecific genus of freshwater ray-finned fish belonging to the family Xenocyprididae, the East Asian minnows or sharpbellies. The only species in the genus is Elopichthys bambusa, the yellowcheek or kanyu (Chinese: 鱤魚; pinyin: gǎnyú), a large fish that is found in freshwater habitats in eastern Asia. It ranges from the Amur River in Russia, through China to the Red and Lam Rivers in Vietnam. It prefers relatively warm waters, entirely avoiding colder highlands. It is considered an important food fish where it occurs, reaching up to 2 m (6 ft 7 in) in total length and 52.2 kg (115 lb) in weight.

This fish spawns in the summer, mainly in streams in places like the mid-Amur, Songhua and Ussuri basins. In the Amur, young are found in the lower sections. They mature after 6 years, and after this time they tend to live in floodplains and winter in the main rivers. This is a fast and agile predator. They mainly consume smaller fish.

From the 1970s to 1990s, the population of yellowcheeks drastically decreased, but in the 2010s the population was observed to increase. The species appears to have disappeared entirely from the Yellow River basin. Major threats are dam construction, pollution, and overfishing. However, little is known about the overall trends of this species. As of 2012 there were no conservation measures in place, and it is unknown if such measures are necessary.

The yellowcheek was first formally described as Leuciscus bambusa by the Scottish naval surgeon, Arctic explorer and naturalist Sir John Richardson in 1845 with its type locality given as Canton. In 1860 Pieter Bleeker classified L. bambusa in the monotypic genus Elopichthys, this genus is now classified in the family Xenocyprididae in the suborder Cyprinoidei, in the order Cypriniformes.
