= Salvelinus boganidae =

Conservation status
- Least Concern (IUCN 3.1)

Scientific classification
- Kingdom: Animalia
- Phylum: Chordata
- Class: Actinopterygii
- Order: Salmoniformes
- Family: Salmonidae
- Genus: Salvelinus
- Species: S. boganidae

Binomial name
- Salvelinus boganidae Berg, 1926

Species of fish

Salvelinus boganidae is a species of bony fish in the family Salmonidae. The fish is endemic to Russia. It is found only in Katanga Lake, the Piasina River Basin in the Taimyr Peninsula and in the Anadyr River Basin in the Chukchi Peninsula. The fish grows up to 46.5 cm long.
