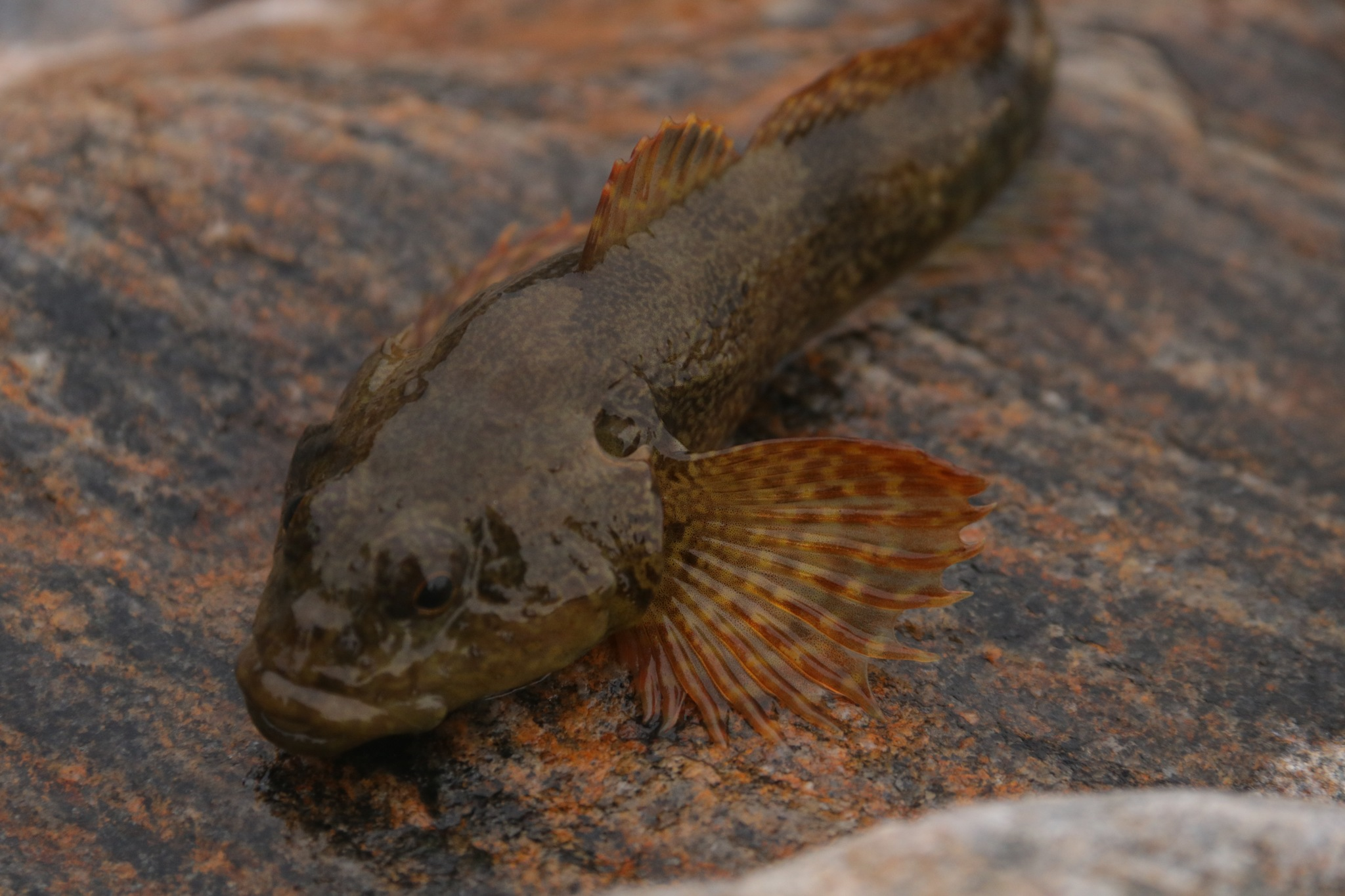

Conservation status
- Least Concern (IUCN 3.1)

Scientific classification
- Kingdom: Animalia
- Phylum: Chordata
- Class: Actinopterygii
- Order: Perciformes
- Suborder: Cottoidei
- Family: Cottidae
- Subfamily: Cottinae
- Genus: Paracottus; Taliev, 1949
- Species: P. knerii

Binomial name
- Paracottus knerii (Dybowski, 1874)

Synonyms
- Cottus knerii Dybowski, 1874; Cottus knerii var. nudus Dybowski, 1908; Paracottus insularis Taliev, 1955; Paracottus kneri putorania Koryakov & Sidelov, 1976

= Stone sculpin =

Species of fish

The stone sculpin (Paracottus knerii) is a species of cottoid fish. It is endemic to Russia, where it is found in Lake Baikal and surrounding tributaries as well as the Gramninskie Lakes, Lake Verkhnaya Agata and the Enisei River and various lakes in Tuva. The stone sculpin is the only recognised species in the monotypic genus Paracottus .

It is often eaten by the Baikal seal, especially in the autumn.

== Taxonomy ==
The stone sculpin was first formally described as Cottus knerii in 1874 by the Polish zoologist Benedykt Dybowski with its type locality given as Lake Baikal and the Angara, Irkut and Selenga rivers in Siberia. In 1949, Dmitrii Nikolaevich Taliev classified the stone sculpin in the genus Paracottus. The genus was classified in the family Cottocomephoridae, however, the 5th edition of Fishes of the World classifies the genus within the subfamily Cottinae of the family Cottidae, studies having found that the genera formerly included in the Cottocomephoridae were a clade arising from the genus Cottus.

== Appearance ==
Maximum total length of the stone sculpin is 14.4 cm (5.7 in), but most are 7–9 cm (2.8–3.5 in). Its colour varies from olive to brown or grey, and it has several dark spots and bands.

== Habitat ==
The stone sculpin is most common in the southern part of Lake Baikal and prefers areas with a stony bottom, but may also occur over sand. It is typically found from shallow water to a depth of 50 m (160 ft), but can occur to 100 m (330 ft).

== Behavior ==
The stone sculpin breeds in the late spring and summer in water that is 6–10 °C (43–50 °F), and up to 1.5 m (5 ft) deep. The female lays 200–700 eggs in a crevice under a stone, which are guarded by the male and hatch after about one month. This sculpin feeds on small animals such as copepods and amphipods.
