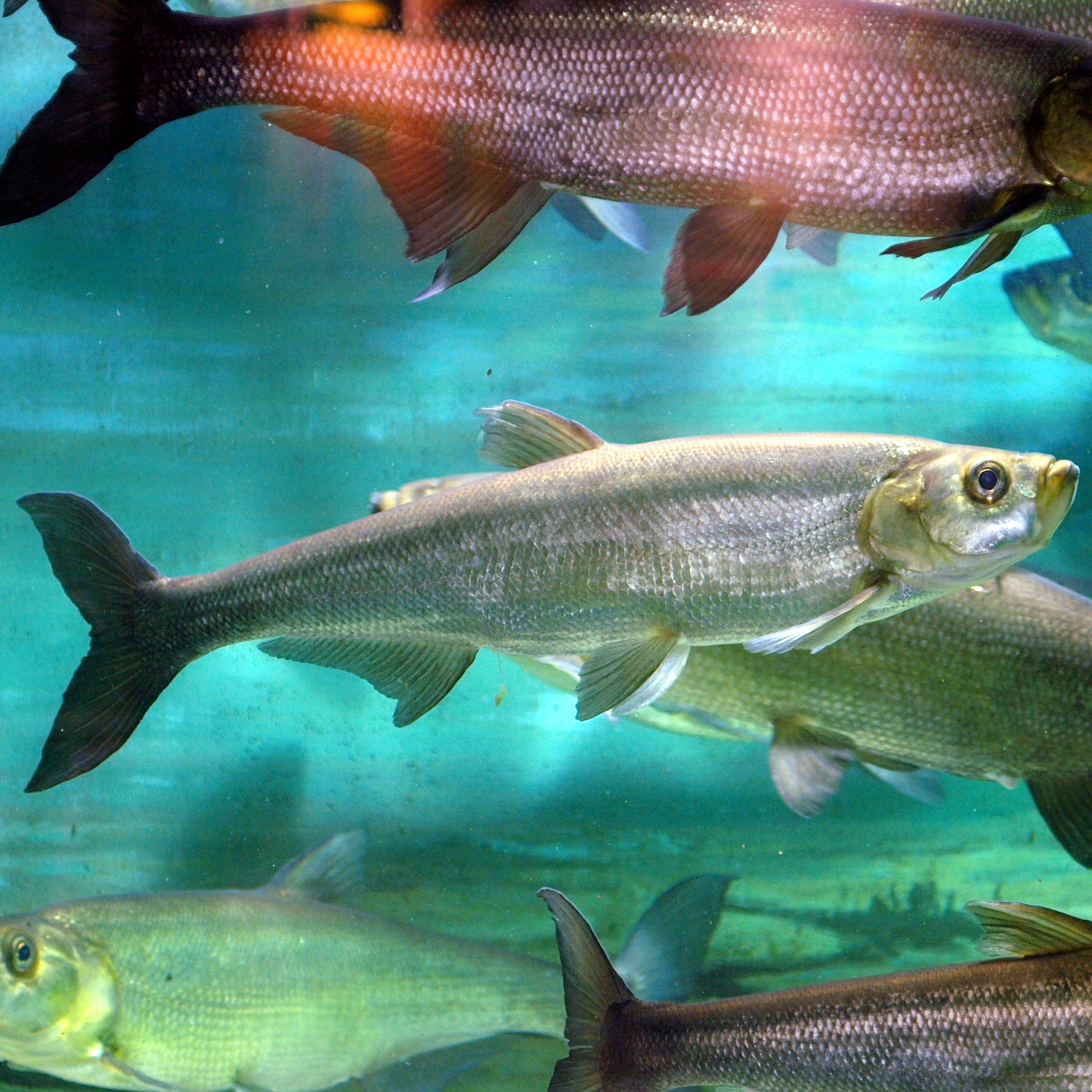
- Chanodichthys erythropterus

Scientific classification
- Kingdom: Animalia
- Phylum: Chordata
- Class: Actinopterygii
- Order: Cypriniformes
- Family: Xenocyprididae
- Subfamily: Cultrinae; Kryzanowsky, 1947

= Cultrinae =

Subfamily of fishes

The Cultrinae are one of at least 13 subfamilies of cyprinid fish. It contains ten genera.

== Recognized genera ==
- Anabarilius (21 species)
- Ancherythroculter (5 species)
- Chanodichthys (5 species)
- Culter (4 species)
- Cultrichthys (monotypic)
- Erythroculter (monotypic)
- Hainania (monotypic)
- Hemiculter (8 species)
- Ischikauia (monotypic)
- Megalobrama (5 species)
- Parabramis – white Amur bream (monotypic)
- Paralaubuca (5 species)
- Pseudohemiculter (4 species)
- Pseudolaubuca (4 species)
- Sinibrama (6 species)
- Toxabramis (7 species)
