= Sinibrama melrosei =

Conservation status
- Data Deficient (IUCN 3.1)

Scientific classification
- Kingdom: Animalia
- Phylum: Chordata
- Class: Actinopterygii
- Order: Cypriniformes
- Suborder: Cyprinoidei
- Family: Xenocyprididae
- Genus: Sinibrama
- Species: S. melrosei

Binomial name
- Sinibrama melrosei (Nichols & Pope, 1927)

Synonyms
- Megalobrama melrosei Nichols & Pope, 1927

Species of fish

Sinibrama melrosei is a species of ray-finned fish in the genus Sinibrama. It is found in southern China (Yunnan, Guangxi, Guangdong, Hong Kong, Hainan), Vietnam, and Laos. It inhabits rivers.
