= Metzia formosae =

Conservation status
- Least Concern (IUCN 3.1)

Scientific classification
- Kingdom: Animalia
- Phylum: Chordata
- Class: Actinopterygii
- Order: Cypriniformes
- Family: Xenocyprididae
- Genus: Metzia
- Species: M. formosae

Binomial name
- Metzia formosae (Ōshima, 1920)

Synonyms
- Rasborinus formosae (Ōshima, 1920); Ischikauia hainanensis (Nichols & Pope, 1927); Metzia fanlingensis (S. Y. Lin, 1939); Rasborinus yaii (Harada, 1943)

Species of fish

Metzia formosae is a species of freshwater ray-finned fish belonging to the family Xenocyprididae, the East Asian minnows or sharpbellies. It is considered "least concern" by the IUCN Red List. It inhabits small rivers in still or slow-moving waters and can be found in Yunnan, China and Taiwan. The mitogenome of Metzia formosae measures 16,614 base pairs, comprising 13 genes responsible for coding proteins, 22 transfer RNA genes, 2 ribosomal RNA genes, and a noncoding control region.
