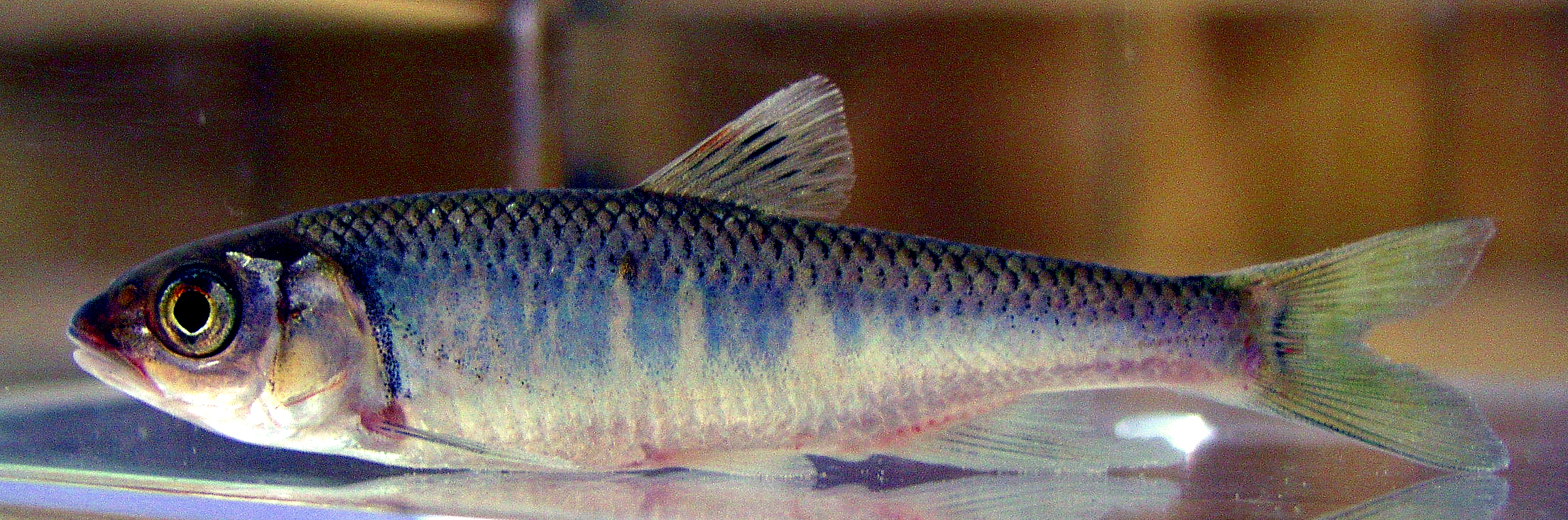
- Pale chub (Z. platypus)

Scientific classification
- Kingdom: Animalia
- Phylum: Chordata
- Class: Actinopterygii
- Order: Cypriniformes
- Family: Xenocyprididae
- Genus: Zacco; D. S. Jordan & Evermann, 1902

Type species
- Leuciscus platypus Temminck & Schlegel, 1846

Species
- See text

= Zacco (fish) =

Genus of fishes

Zacco is a genus of small freshwater ray-finned fishes belonging to the family Xenocyprididae, the East Asian minnows or sharpbellies. They are found in freshwater habitats in China and northern Vietnam. The generic name Zacco derives from the Japanese Zako 雑魚 (Coarse fish).

== Species ==
The following species are currently placed in the genus:

- Zacco acanthogenys (Boulenger, 1901)
- Zacco platypus (Temminck & Schlegel, 1846) (Freshwater minnow)
- Zacco sinensis L. Zhu, D. Yu & H. Z. Liu, 2020
- Zacco tiaoxiensis Y. Zhang, J.-J. Zhou & J. Q. Yang, 2023

Other species formerly placed here are now in Candidia, Nipponocypris, Opsariichthys and Parazacco.
