= Zacco acutipinnis =

Scientific classification
- Kingdom: Animalia
- Phylum: Chordata
- Class: Actinopterygii
- Order: Cypriniformes
- Family: Xenocyprididae
- Genus: Zacco
- Species: Z. acutipinnis

Binomial name
- Zacco acutipinnis Bleeker, 1871

Species of fish

Zacco acutipinnis is a species of cyprinid of the genus Zacco. It inhabits southern China and has a maximum length of 7.8 inches (20 cm) among unsexed males. Described in 1871 by Pieter Bleeker, it is considered harmless to humans. It has 10 dorsal soft rays, 12 anal soft rays and 39-41 vertebrae and has not been classified on the IUCN Red List.
