= Metzia lineata =

Conservation status
- Least Concern (IUCN 3.1)

Scientific classification
- Kingdom: Animalia
- Phylum: Chordata
- Class: Actinopterygii
- Order: Cypriniformes
- Family: Xenocyprididae
- Genus: Metzia
- Species: M. lineata

Binomial name
- Metzia lineata (Pellegrin, 1907)

Synonyms
- Ischikauia lineata Pellegrin, 1907; Rasborinus lineatus (Pellegrin 1907); Rasborichthys altior Regan, 1913; Rasborinus fukiensis Nichols, 1925; Rasborinus hainanensis Nichols, & Pope, 1927; Clupea huae Tirant, 1883; Chela huae (Tirant, 1883); Clupeoides hueensis Chevey, 1932

Species of fish

Metzia lineata is a species of freshwater ray-finned fish belonging to the family Xenocyprididae, the East Asian minnows or sharpbellies. It inhabits medium-sized and small rivers of southern China, Taiwan, Laos, and Vietnam and is considered "least concern" by the IUCN Red List. It has a maximum standard length of 10.0 centimetres (3.9 in).
