= Siniichthys bleekeri =

Scientific classification
- Kingdom: Animalia
- Phylum: Chordata
- Class: Actinopterygii
- Order: Cypriniformes
- Family: Xenocyprididae
- Genus: Siniichthys
- Species: S. bleekeri

Binomial name
- Siniichthys bleekeri Warpachowski, 1887

Species of fish

Siniichthys bleekeri is a species of freshwater ray-finned fish belonging to the family Xenocyprididae, the East Asian minnows or sharpbellies. It originates in the Amur River, Yangtze River, and the Yellow River basins in China. It was originally described by N. A. Warpachowski in 1887 but it may be a junior synonym of Ussuri sharpbelly (Siniichthys lucidus).

The fish reaches a size of up to 17.0 cm (6.7 in) long. Its diet primarily consists of plants and detritus.
