= Hainania =

Hainania is the scientific name of two genera of organisms and may refer to:

- Hainania (fish), a genus of fishes in the family Cyprinidae
- Hainania (plant), a member of the subfamily Brownlowioideae
