= Megalobrama pellegrini =

Conservation status
- Vulnerable (IUCN 3.1)

Scientific classification
- Kingdom: Animalia
- Phylum: Chordata
- Class: Actinopterygii
- Order: Cypriniformes
- Suborder: Cyprinoidei
- Family: Xenocyprididae
- Genus: Megalobrama
- Species: M. pellegrini

Binomial name
- Megalobrama pellegrini (T. L. Tchang, 1930)

Synonyms
- Parosteobrama pellegrini Tchang, 1930

Species of fish

Megalobrama pellegrini is a species of freshwater ray-finned fish belonging to the family Xenocyprididae, the East Asian minnows or sharpbellies. This fish is endemic to upper reaches of the Yangtze River. It grows to 25 cm (9.8 in) TL.
