= Xenocypris yunnanensis =

Conservation status
- Critically Endangered (IUCN 3.1)

Scientific classification
- Kingdom: Animalia
- Phylum: Chordata
- Class: Actinopterygii
- Order: Cypriniformes
- Suborder: Cyprinoidei
- Family: Xenocyprididae
- Genus: Xenocypris
- Species: X. yunnanensis

Binomial name
- Xenocypris yunnanensis Nichols, 1925

Species of fish

Xenocypris yunnanensis, the Kunming nase, is a species of ray-finned fish in the genus Xenocypris. It is endemic to Lake Dianchi in Yunnan Province, China. The species started to decline in the 1970s and has not been caught in the lake after two specimens were collected in 1985; it may be extinct. Its demise is likely due to introduced fish species, grass carp. It was also impacted by over-fishing and pollution. They grow to a maximum length of 23 cm (9.1 in). They are dark grayish with a silvery white belly, gray dorsal fin, reddish anal fin and orange red caudal fin. They have a rounded belly, blunt snout, eyes on the lateral part of their heads, and a small transverse mouth.
