= Candidia pingtungensis =

Scientific classification
- Kingdom: Animalia
- Phylum: Chordata
- Class: Actinopterygii
- Order: Cypriniformes
- Family: Xenocyprididae
- Genus: Candidia
- Species: C. pingtungensis

Binomial name
- Candidia pingtungensis I. S. Chen, J. H. Wu & C. H. Hsu, 2008

Species of fish

Candidia pingtungensis is a species of freshwater ray-finned fishes belonging to the family Xenocyprididae. This fish is endemic to Taiwan where it occurs in the Tongkang River southwards to all of the western drainage systems of the Hengchun Peninsula, as well as the eastern drainage of the Kongkou River and much of Pingtung County.
