= Pseudohemiculter hainanensis =

Conservation status
- Least Concern (IUCN 3.1)

Scientific classification
- Kingdom: Animalia
- Phylum: Chordata
- Class: Actinopterygii
- Order: Cypriniformes
- Suborder: Cyprinoidei
- Family: Xenocyprididae
- Genus: Pseudohemiculter
- Species: P. hainanensis

Binomial name
- Pseudohemiculter hainanensis (Boulenger, 1900)

Synonyms
- Barilius hainanensis Boulenger, 1900; Hemiculter hainanensis (Boulenger, 1900); Hemiculter hunanensis T. L. Tchang, 1930; Hemiculter kinghwaensis K. F. Wang, 1935

Species of fish

Pseudohemiculter hainanensis is a species of freshwater ray-finned fish from the family Xenocyprididae, the East Asian minnows or sharpbellies, from south east Asia. It occurs in the Yuanjiang, Zhujiang, Hainan Island, and middle reaches of Changjiang River in China and Vietnam.
