= Hemiculterella wui =

Conservation status
- Least Concern (IUCN 3.1)

Scientific classification
- Kingdom: Animalia
- Phylum: Chordata
- Class: Actinopterygii
- Order: Cypriniformes
- Family: Xenocyprididae
- Genus: Hemiculterella
- Species: H. wui

Binomial name
- Hemiculterella wui (Ki. Fu. Wang, 1935)

Synonyms
- Nicholsiculter wui K. F. Wang, 1935; Anabarilius wui (K. F. Wang, 1935)

Species of fish

Hemiculterella wui is a species of freshwater ray-finned fish belonging to the family Xenocyprididae, the East Asian minnows or sharpbellies. This species is fiund in the Pearl River and Qiantang rivers in Zhejiang, Guizhou and Guangxi provinces of China. This species has a maximum published total length of 17.1 cm (6.7 in), although a standard length of 12.3 cm (4.8 in) is more typical.
