= Toxabramis houdemeri =

Conservation status
- Least Concern (IUCN 3.1)

Scientific classification
- Kingdom: Animalia
- Phylum: Chordata
- Class: Actinopterygii
- Order: Cypriniformes
- Family: Xenocyprididae
- Genus: Toxabramis
- Species: T. houdemeri

Binomial name
- Toxabramis houdemeri Pellegrin, 1932

Synonyms
- Toxabramis houdemeri var. abbreviata Pellegrin, 1934; Toxabramis hotayensis V. H. Nguyễn, 2001

Species of fish

Toxabramis houdemeri is a species of ray-finned fish in the genus Toxabramis. It is found in China and Vietnam.
