= Metzia mesembrinum =

Scientific classification
- Kingdom: Animalia
- Phylum: Chordata
- Class: Actinopterygii
- Order: Cypriniformes
- Family: Xenocyprididae
- Genus: Metzia
- Species: M. mesembrinum

Binomial name
- Metzia mesembrinum (D. S. Jordan & Evermann, 1902)

Synonyms
- Acheilognathus mesembrinum D. S. Jordan & Evermann, 1902; Ischikavia macrolepis Regan, 1908; Rasborinus macrolepis (Regan, 1908); Rasborinus takakii Ōshima, 1920

Species of fish

Metzia mesembrinum is a species of freshwater ray-finned fish belonging to the family Xenocyprididae, the East Asian minnows or sharpbellies. It was endemic to Taiwan but has been introduced to Singapore. This species has a maximum published standard length of 4.8 cm (1.9 in). The species was found on Taiwan proper until the 1920s, when its range was reduced to the outlying island of Kinmen.
