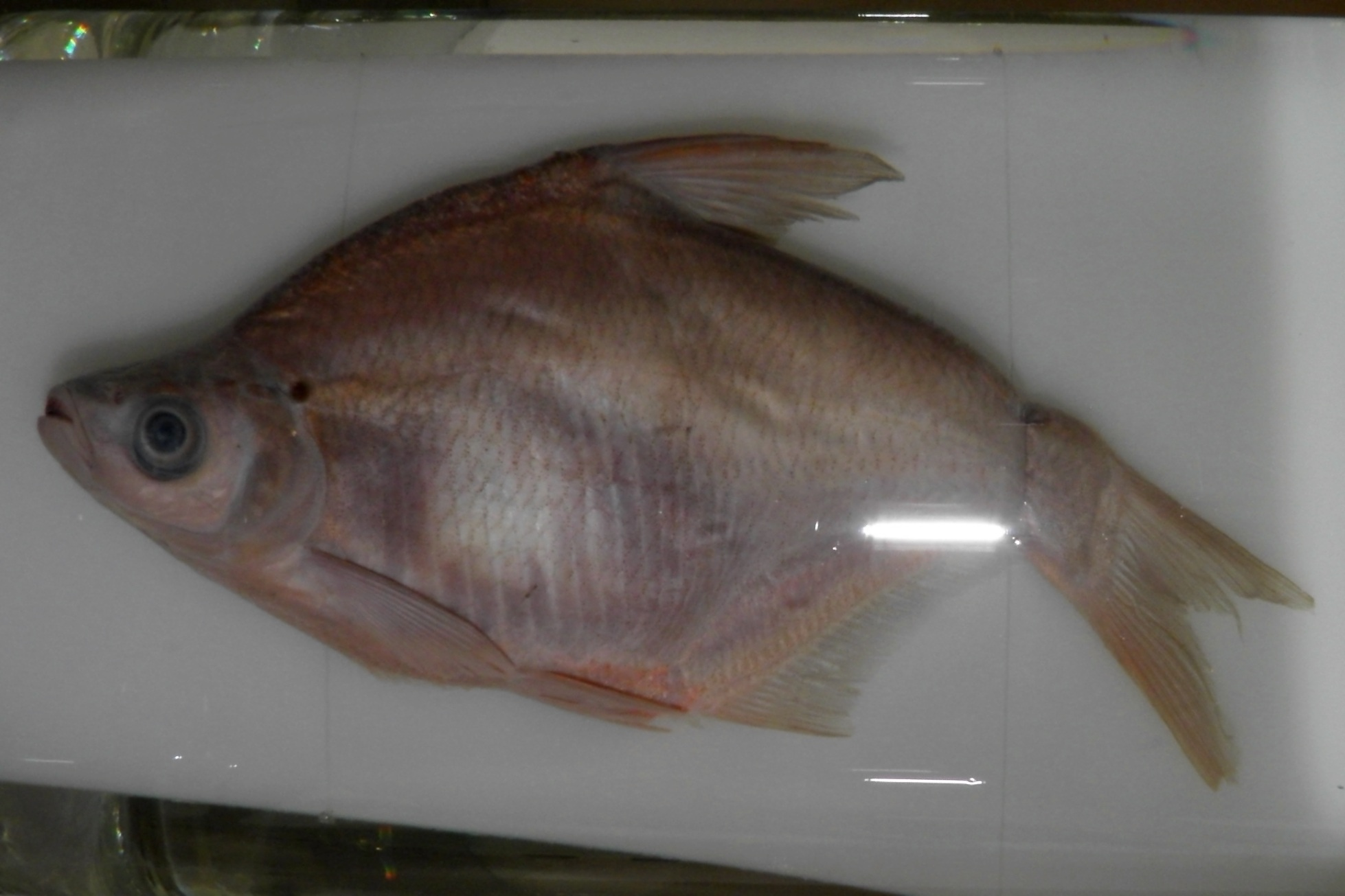

Scientific classification
- Kingdom: Animalia
- Phylum: Chordata
- Class: Actinopterygii
- Order: Cypriniformes
- Suborder: Cyprinoidei
- Family: Xenocyprididae
- Genus: Megalobrama
- Species: M. terminalis

Binomial name
- Megalobrama terminalis (J. Richardson, 1846)

Synonyms
- Abramis terminalis Richardson, 1846; Parabramis terminalis (Richardson, 1846); Megalobrama hoffmanni Herre & Myers, 1931

= Black Amur bream =

Species of fish

The black Amur bream (Megalobrama terminalis) is a species of freshwater cyprinid fish in the genus Megalobrama.

== Geographic distribution ==
It is found in the basin of the Amur, Ussuri, and Sungari Rivers, and in Lake Khanka.

== Footnotes ==
- Froese, Rainer; Pauly, Daniel (eds.). "Megalobrama terminalis". FishBase.
