= Pseudohemiculter kweichowensis =

Conservation status
- Data Deficient (IUCN 3.1)

Scientific classification
- Kingdom: Animalia
- Phylum: Chordata
- Class: Actinopterygii
- Order: Cypriniformes
- Suborder: Cyprinoidei
- Family: Xenocyprididae
- Genus: Pseudohemiculter
- Species: P. kweichowensis

Binomial name
- Pseudohemiculter kweichowensis (D. S. Tang, 1942)

Synonyms
- Hemiculter kweichowensis D. S. Tang, 1942

Species of fish

Pseudohemiculter kweichowensis is a species of freshwater ray-finned fish from the family Xenocyprididae, the East Asian minnows or sharpbellies. It is endemic to Guiyang, China.
