= Metzia longinasus =

Conservation status
- Near Threatened (IUCN 3.1)

Scientific classification
- Kingdom: Animalia
- Phylum: Chordata
- Class: Actinopterygii
- Order: Cypriniformes
- Family: Xenocyprididae
- Genus: Metzia
- Species: M. longinasus

Binomial name
- Metzia longinasus X. Gan, J. H. Lan & E. Zhang, 2009

Species of fish

Metzia longinasus is a species of freshwater ray-finned fish belonging to the family Xenocyprididae, the East Asian minnows or sharpbellies. This species is found in the Hongshui-He River in Guangxi.
