= Toxabramis swinhonis =

Scientific classification
- Kingdom: Animalia
- Phylum: Chordata
- Class: Actinopterygii
- Order: Cypriniformes
- Family: Xenocyprididae
- Genus: Toxabramis
- Species: T. swinhonis

Binomial name
- Toxabramis swinhonis Günther, 1873

Synonyms
- Toxabramis paiyantieni Mori, 1941

Species of fish

Toxabramis swinhonis is a species of ray-finned fish in the genus Toxabramis. It is found in the Yangtze, Yellow, and other rivers in China.
