= Xenocyprioides parvulus =

Conservation status
- Endangered (IUCN 3.1)

Scientific classification
- Kingdom: Animalia
- Phylum: Chordata
- Class: Actinopterygii
- Order: Cypriniformes
- Family: Xenocyprididae
- Genus: Xenocyprioides
- Species: X. parvulus

Binomial name
- Xenocyprioides parvulus Yi-Yu Chen, 1982

Species of fish

Xenocyprioides parvulus is a species of freshwater ray-finned fish belonging to the family Xenocyprididae, the East Asian minnows or sharpbellies. It inhabits Qinzhou, Guangxi province, China, and has a maximum length of 2.5 centimetres (0.98 in). It is considered harmless to humans.
