= Xenocyprioides carinatus =

Conservation status
- Least Concern (IUCN 3.1)

Scientific classification
- Kingdom: Animalia
- Phylum: Chordata
- Class: Actinopterygii
- Order: Cypriniformes
- Family: Xenocyprididae
- Genus: Xenocyprioides
- Species: X. carinatus

Binomial name
- Xenocyprioides carinatus Yi-Yu Chen & Huang, 1985

Species of fish

Xenocyprioides carinatus is a genus of freshwater ray-finned fish belonging to the family Xenocyprididae, the East Asian minnows or sharpbellies. It inhabits Longzhou in China's Guangxi province and has a maximum length of 4.0 centimetres (1.6 in). It is considered harmless to humans.
