= Ancherythroculter nigrocauda =

Scientific classification
- Kingdom: Animalia
- Phylum: Chordata
- Class: Actinopterygii
- Order: Cypriniformes
- Family: Xenocyprididae
- Genus: Ancherythroculter
- Species: A. nigrocauda

Binomial name
- Ancherythroculter nigrocauda P. L. Yih & C. K. Wu, 1964

Species of fish

Ancherythroculter nigrocauda is a species of freshwater ray-finned fish belonging to the family Xenocyprididae, the East Asian minnows or sharpbellies. This species is found in the basin of the Yangtze in China. The maximum published standard length of this fish is 27.5 cm (10.8 in).
