= Atrilinea macrolepis =

Conservation status
- Critically Endangered (IUCN 3.1)

Scientific classification
- Kingdom: Animalia
- Phylum: Chordata
- Class: Actinopterygii
- Order: Cypriniformes
- Family: Xenocyprididae
- Genus: Atrilinea
- Species: A. macrolepis

Binomial name
- Atrilinea macrolepis S. L. Song & S. M. Fang, 1987

Species of fish

Atrilinea macrolepis is a species of freshwater ray-finned fishes belonging to the family Xenocyprididae. This fish is endemic to China where it occurs in the upper Han Jiang basin in Shaanxi and Hubei. A. macrolepis is a small fish with a maximum published standard length of 10 cm (3.9 in).
