= Pseudolaubuca jouyi =

Scientific classification
- Kingdom: Animalia
- Phylum: Chordata
- Class: Actinopterygii
- Order: Cypriniformes
- Suborder: Cyprinoidei
- Family: Xenocyprididae
- Genus: Pseudolaubuca
- Species: P. jouyi

Binomial name
- Pseudolaubuca jouyi (D. S. Jordan & Starks, 1905)

Synonyms
- Parapelecus jouyi D. S. Jordan & Starks, 1905

Species of fish

Pseudolaubuca jouyi is a species of freshwater ray-finned fish from the family Xenocyprididae, the East Asian minnows or sharpbellies. It occurs in South Korea.
