= Xenocypris hupeinensis =

Conservation status
- Data Deficient (IUCN 3.1)

Scientific classification
- Kingdom: Animalia
- Phylum: Chordata
- Class: Actinopterygii
- Order: Cypriniformes
- Family: Xenocyprididae
- Genus: Xenocypris
- Species: X. hupeinensis

Binomial name
- Xenocypris hupeinensis P. L. Yih, 1964

Species of fish

Xenocypris hupeinensis is a species of freshwater ray-finned fish belonging to the family Xenocyprididae, the East Asian minnows or sharpbellies. It inhabits the upper and middle Changjiang River of China and has a maximum length among unsexed males of 25.6 centimetres (10.1 in). It is classified as "data deficient" by the IUCN.
