= Sinibrama wui =

Scientific classification
- Domain: Eukaryota
- Kingdom: Animalia
- Phylum: Chordata
- Class: Actinopterygii
- Order: Cypriniformes
- Suborder: Cyprinoidei
- Family: Xenocyprididae
- Genus: Sinibrama
- Species: S. wui

Binomial name
- Sinibrama wui (Rendahl (de), 1932)

Synonyms
- Chanodichthys wui Rendahl, 1933

Species of fish

Sinibrama wui is a species of ray-finned fish in the genus Sinibrama which is endemic to China. It is the type species of the genus Sinibrama but there is some controversy as to which form was described first. If the form described by S.Y Lin in 1932 is considered specifically distinct from that described by Rendahl then the form named by Rendahl should revert to the binomial Sinibrama typus.
