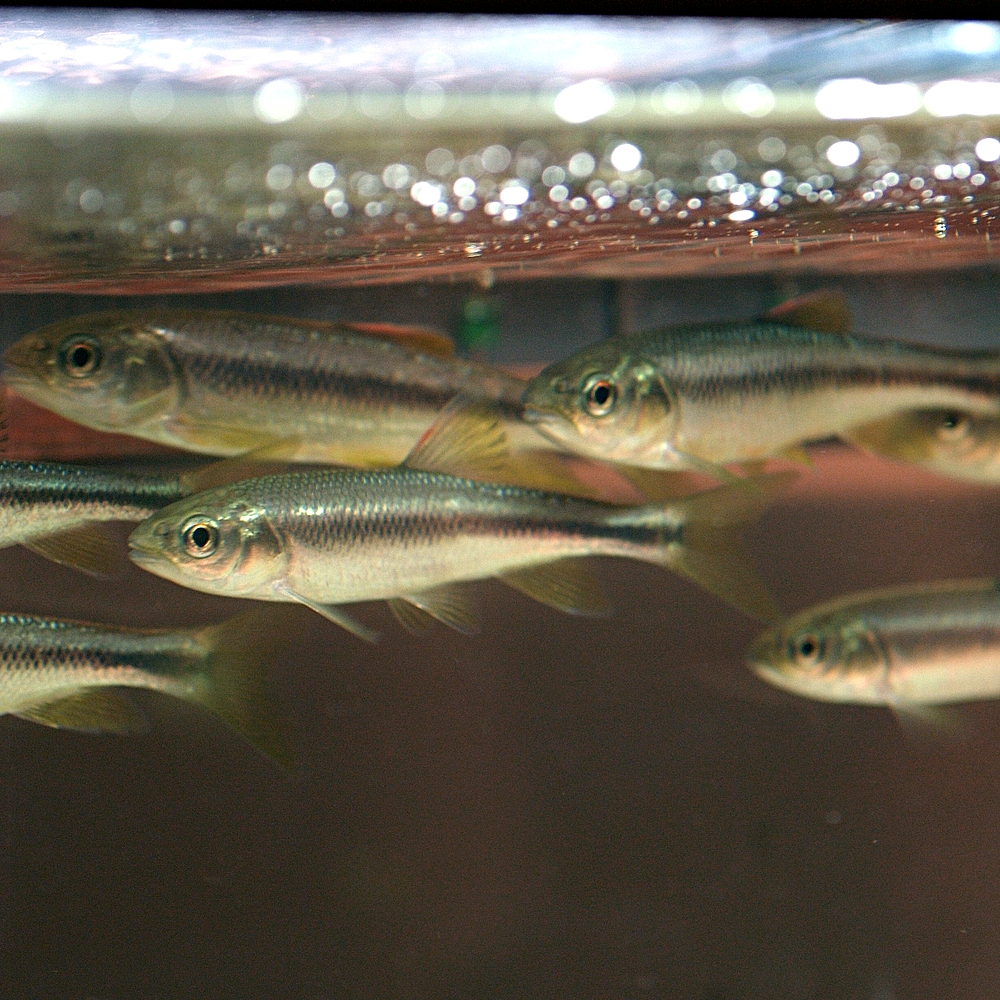

Scientific classification
- Kingdom: Animalia
- Phylum: Chordata
- Class: Actinopterygii
- Division: Teleostei
- Order: Cypriniformes
- Family: Xenocyprididae
- Genus: Nipponocypris
- Species: N. temminckii

Binomial name
- Nipponocypris temminckii (Temminck & Schlegel, 1846)

Synonyms
- Leuciscus temminckii Temminck & Schlegel, 1846; Zacco temminckii (Temminck & Schlegel, 1846)

= Nipponocypris temminckii =

Species of fish

Nipponocypris temminckii, the dark chub, is a species of freshwater ray-finned fish belonging to the family Xenocyprididae, the East Asian minnows or sharpbellies. It inhabits China, Japan and Korea and has a maximum length of 15.0 centimetres (5.9 in).

== Etymology ==
The fish is named in honor of Coenraad Jacob Temminck (1778–1858), the director of the Rijksmuseum van Natuurlijke Historie in Leiden, the Netherlands. Incidentally, Temminck did not name this species after himself; Schlegel wrote the description and used the name, yet the publication in which it appeared is credited to both authors.
