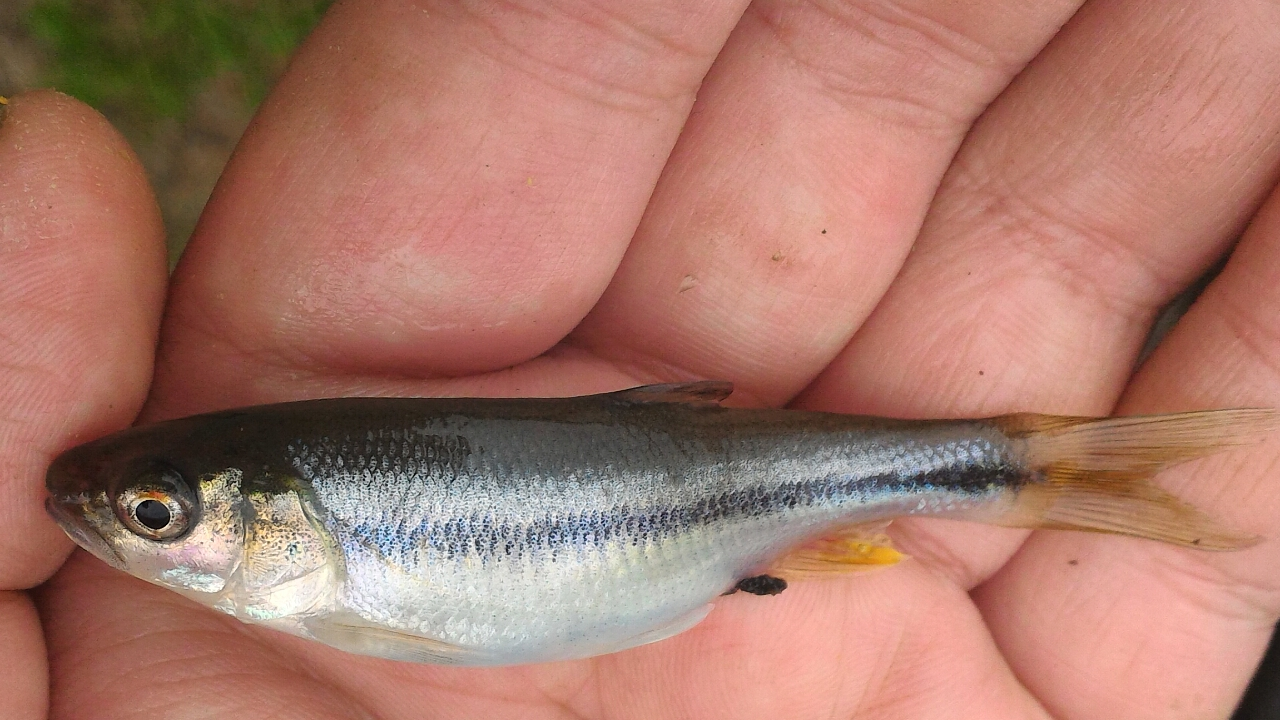

Scientific classification
- Kingdom: Animalia
- Phylum: Chordata
- Class: Actinopterygii
- Order: Cypriniformes
- Family: Xenocyprididae
- Genus: Candidia
- Species: C. barbata

Binomial name
- Candidia barbata (Regan, 1908)

Synonyms
- Opsariichthys barbatus Regan, 1908; Candidia barbatus (Regan, 1908); Zacco barbatus (Regan, 1908)

= Candidia barbata =

Species of fish

Candidia barbata is a species of freshwater ray-finned fishes belonging to the family Xenocyprididae. This species is endemic to Taiwan where it is found in the upper reaches of rivers, preferring to stay in cooler, clear waters.
