= Sinibrama longianalis =

Conservation status
- Least Concern (IUCN 3.1)

Scientific classification
- Kingdom: Animalia
- Phylum: Chordata
- Class: Actinopterygii
- Order: Cypriniformes
- Suborder: Cyprinoidei
- Family: Xenocyprididae
- Genus: Sinibrama
- Species: S. longianalis

Binomial name
- Sinibrama longianalis Z. G. Xie, C. X. Xie & E. Zhang, 2003

Species of fish

Sinibrama longianalis is a species of ray-finned fish in the genus Sinibrama. This species is endemic to Guizhou in China.
