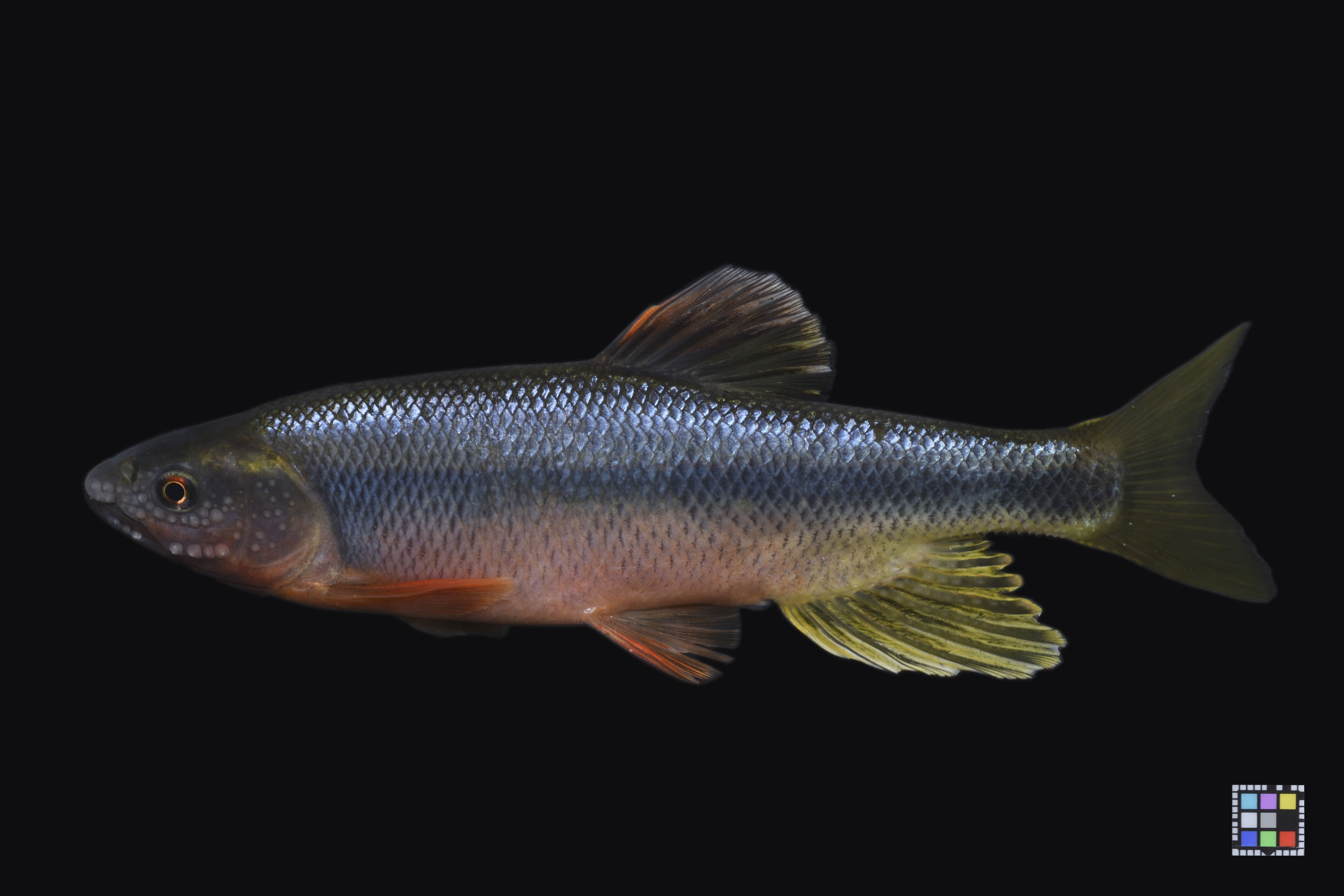

Conservation status
- Least Concern (IUCN 3.1)

Scientific classification
- Kingdom: Animalia
- Phylum: Chordata
- Class: Actinopterygii
- Order: Cypriniformes
- Family: Xenocyprididae
- Genus: Nipponocypris
- Species: N. sieboldii

Binomial name
- Nipponocypris sieboldii (Temminck & Schlegel, 1846)

Synonyms
- Zacco mitsukurii Ishikawa, 1904

= Nipponocypris sieboldii =

Species of fish

Nipponocypris sieboldii is a species of freshwater ray-finned fish belonging to the family Xenocyprididae, the East Asian minnows or sharpbellies. that is endemic to Japan. It has a maximum length of 12.5 centimetres (4.9 in).
