= Pseudolaubuca engraulis =

Conservation status
- Least Concern (IUCN 3.1)

Scientific classification
- Kingdom: Animalia
- Phylum: Chordata
- Class: Actinopterygii
- Order: Cypriniformes
- Suborder: Cyprinoidei
- Family: Xenocyprididae
- Genus: Pseudolaubuca
- Species: P. engraulis

Binomial name
- Pseudolaubuca engraulis (Nichols, 1925)

Synonyms
- Hemiculterella engraulis Nichols, 1925

Species of fish

Pseudolaubuca engraulis is a species of freshwater ray-finned fish from the family Xenocyprididae, the East Asian minnows or sharpbellies. It occurs in the Zhu Jiang, Yangtze, Yellow rivers and their drainages in China.
