= Pseudohemiculter pacboensis =

Scientific classification
- Kingdom: Animalia
- Phylum: Chordata
- Class: Actinopterygii
- Order: Cypriniformes
- Suborder: Cyprinoidei
- Family: Xenocyprididae
- Genus: Pseudohemiculter
- Species: P. pacboensis

Binomial name
- Pseudohemiculter pacboensis V. H. Nguyễn, 2001

Species of fish

Pseudohemiculter pacboensis s a species of freshwater ray-finned fish from the family Xenocyprididae, the East Asian minnows or sharpbellies, from south east Asia. It is endemic to Vietnam.
