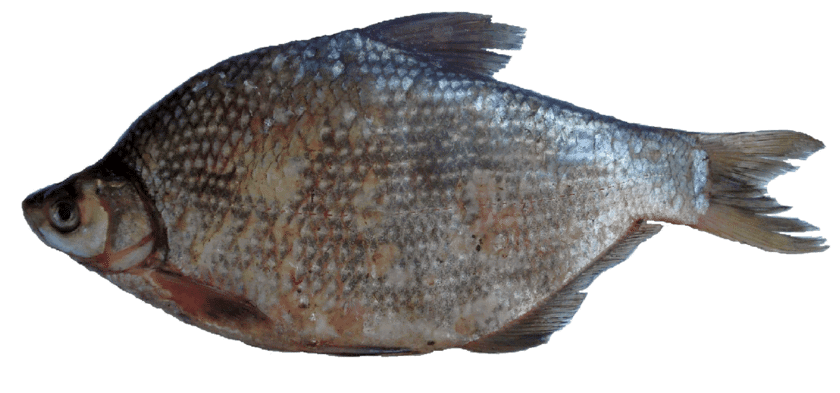

Conservation status
- Least Concern (IUCN 3.1)

Scientific classification
- Kingdom: Animalia
- Phylum: Chordata
- Class: Actinopterygii
- Order: Cypriniformes
- Suborder: Cyprinoidei
- Family: Xenocyprididae
- Genus: Megalobrama
- Species: M. mantschuricus

Binomial name
- Megalobrama mantschuricus (Basilewsky, 1855)

Synonyms
- Abramis mantschuricus Basilewsky, 1855

= Megalobrama mantschuricus =

Species of fish

Megalobrama mantschuricus, the black bream, is a species of freshwater ray-finned fish belonging to the family Xenocyprididae, the East Asian minnows or sharpbellies. This fish is found from the Amur river in eastern Russia south through the major rivers of China to northern Viet Nam.
