= Metzia parva =

Scientific classification
- Kingdom: Animalia
- Phylum: Chordata
- Class: Actinopterygii
- Order: Cypriniformes
- Family: Xenocyprididae
- Genus: Metzia
- Species: M. parva

Binomial name
- Metzia parva W. Luo, J. P. Sullivan, H. T. Zhao & Z. G. Peng, 2015

Species of fish

Metzia parva is a species of freshwater ray-finned fish belonging to the family Xenocyprididae, the East Asian minnows or sharpbellies. This species is known only from the Cheng-jiang River, a tributary of Hongshui He River in the Pearl River basin in Guangxi.
