= Atrilinea macrops =

Conservation status
- Data Deficient (IUCN 3.1)

Scientific classification
- Kingdom: Animalia
- Phylum: Chordata
- Class: Actinopterygii
- Order: Cypriniformes
- Family: Xenocyprididae
- Genus: Atrilinea
- Species: A. macrops

Binomial name
- Atrilinea macrops (S. Y. Lin, 1931)

Synonyms
- Barilius macrops S. Y. Lin, 1931

Species of fish

Atrilinea macrops is a species of freshwater ray-finned fishes belonging to the family Xenocyprididae. This species has been recordedonly from Dayaoshan in Guangxi.
