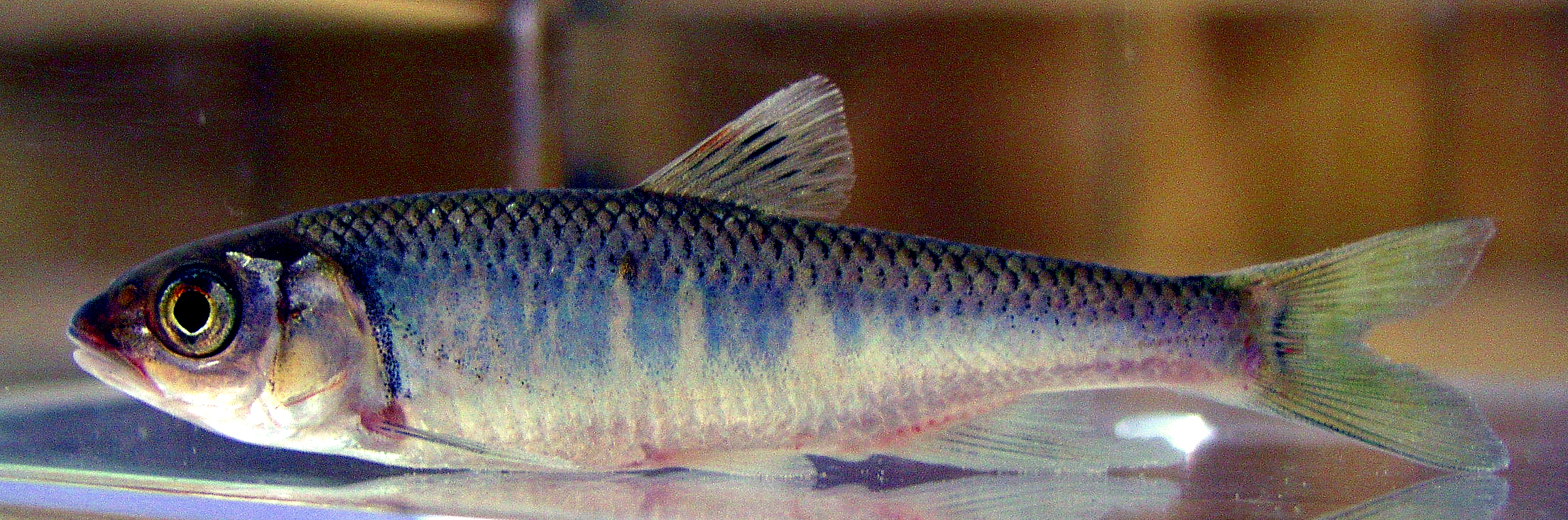

Conservation status
- Least Concern (IUCN 3.1)

Scientific classification
- Kingdom: Animalia
- Phylum: Chordata
- Class: Actinopterygii
- Division: Teleostei
- Order: Cypriniformes
- Family: Xenocyprididae
- Genus: Zacco
- Species: Z. platypus

Binomial name
- Zacco platypus (Temminck & Schlegel, 1846)

Synonyms
- Leuciscus platypus Temminck & Schlegel, 1846; Leuciscus macropus Temminck & Schlegel, 1846; Leuciscus minor Temminck & Schlegel, 1846

= Zacco platypus =

Species of fish

The pale chub (Zacco platypus), also known as pale bleak or fresh-water sprat, is one of the most extensively distributed Asiatic cyprinids and is found in Korea, Japan, Taiwan, and most of Southeast China. This species of fish is native to freshwater rivers and mountainous streams from northern China and Korea to northern Vietnam. They can grow up to 20 centimetres (7.9 in) but usually grow to 13 centimetres (5.1 in). Its diet consists of zooplankton, invertebrates, fish, and debris. It is an invasive species in Taiwan. Zacco platypus is called Oikawa オイカワ（追河、Opsariichthys platypus) in Japan.

== Description ==
The pale chub has a moderately large head with moderately large eyes that are located on the upper side of the head. They have a large mouth, so much so that the posterior end of the jaw reaches the anterior part of the eye. The pale chub has an elongated body that is more compressed at the posterior end and have a black longitudinal band. Their maximum length is 20 cm (7.9 in) and on average pale chubs are 13 cm (5.1 in) in length. The moderately large cycloid scales that are much larger on the sides than on other parts of the fish, and they have a complete lateral line. They have a forked caudal fin where its upper edge is shorter than the lower. Their fins are bright yellow on the pelvics and dirty on the pectorals and caudal fin. They have a grayish coloration close to the dorsal with the rest of the body being silvery. Zacco platypus have 7 dorsal fin rays and it is located near the midline between its snout tip and caudal peduncle end. Each spine of the first dorsal fin is slightly extended, and the first spine of the male fish is extended similarly like a thread; the edge of the second dorsal fin is straight, and the rays are all branched out. They have elongated anal fin rays with its longest reaching the caudal peduncle with 8-10 anal fin rays and 7-9 pelvic fin rays. They have one lateral line with 42-46 lateral line scales with 6.5-8.5 scales above it and 3 scales below the lateral line. There is a transverse lateral line in the occipital area which connects the lateral lines on both sides.

There are no scales on the head. The top of the Zacco platypus is quite rounded towards both sides and its muzzle narrows noticeably in the front of the nostrils, ending in a rather short, conical but rounded end. They have oblique mouths, where the posterior end of their upper jaw reaches the anterior margin of the eye. They have a dental formula of pharyngeal teeth of 1,4,4-4,4,3 which are conical and have a curved tip. Zacco platypus also have oral folds which are present at the bottom of the oral cavity, and they gradually develop and increase in number with growth. The occipital region has two bondy low ridges. When spawning, the males will have 10 or more vertical strips that are bluish in color. They can live for 6 or more years.

== Habitat ==
The pale chub live primarily in freshwater. The adults prefer shallow waters with a rapid water flow and tend to hide in cracks between rocks in order to remain in water areas with high food availability and low predation. They do not really like deep, stagnant water. They live in waters that have an average of 23–24 °C (73–75 °F). They mainly live by the bottom when adults because that is where their food source is located. However, due to environmental changes and pollution, the population is shrinking in many places.

== Distribution ==
They are widely distributed to northern China, Korea and northern Vietnam. They are also found in Japan and the northwestern part of Taiwan. They are mostly found in climates of 10–22 °C (50–72 °F).

== Lifespan and behaviors ==
The life expectancy of a Z. platypus is around 5 years and they are quite tolerant to various environmental stress factors. Male chubs become aggressive during mating season and will head butt, expel, rotational fight, and fight hile swimming parallel to any threatening organisms. Studies have shown that fish living in higher-predation environments led to less spontaneous swimming activity and risk-taking behaviors when compared to fish from low-predation populations.

== Diet and predation ==
They are omnivores but prefer eating other animals over eating plants. They feed on zooplankton, algae, small fish and detritus. When young, they mainly eat insects and larvae. The young tend to hunt in groups, and they tend to hunt at dawn. Adults tend to be more solitary in their hunting.

The main predators are piscivorous fish, such as Silurus meridionalis, the Southern catfish or Chanodichthys erythropterus, the predatory carp, and Silurus asotus, the Chinese catfish; additionally, there are potential avian threats.

== Reproduction ==
The genus Zacco all have similar mating patterns and have two major mating seasons: one in the spring (February to April) and another in the summer (June to August). In nature, males become vibrant around the time of breeding to attract females to mate. There have been no reports of successful breeding in an aquarium although it is possible for reproduction in an aquarium.

The larger GSI and number of yolk in the spring in comparison to the values in the summer prove that Zacco have an evolve reproductive style in which they invest more energy to mate in the spring in order to avoid the damage of summer floods.

At the beginning of their mating ritual, several males will chase a single female at a time, occasionally showing their dorsal and anal fins to threaten competitors, as well as speeding aggressively and fighting each other. After a while, the females will rest on the sandy floor and the male will press on her belly to make her tilt with her anus closer to the male. The male will then vibrate its body and stir up the riverbed while releasing its sperm and the female will scatter its eggs from the vibration. Subordinate males will often join the spawning to attempt to fertilize some of the eggs as well.

During their breeding season, male pale chubs will undergo sexual dimorphism by growing numerous sharp and colorful nuptial tubercles on their head, especially on their jaws, and fins. Their body shape also changes during this time; their anal fin extends and the body depth increases for both sexes during this season.

Z. platypus are free spawners and thus after spawning, both the males and females will cover their eggs with sand by vibrating their anal fins and "digging" up sand. There is no parental care of the eggs afterwards.

== Uses ==
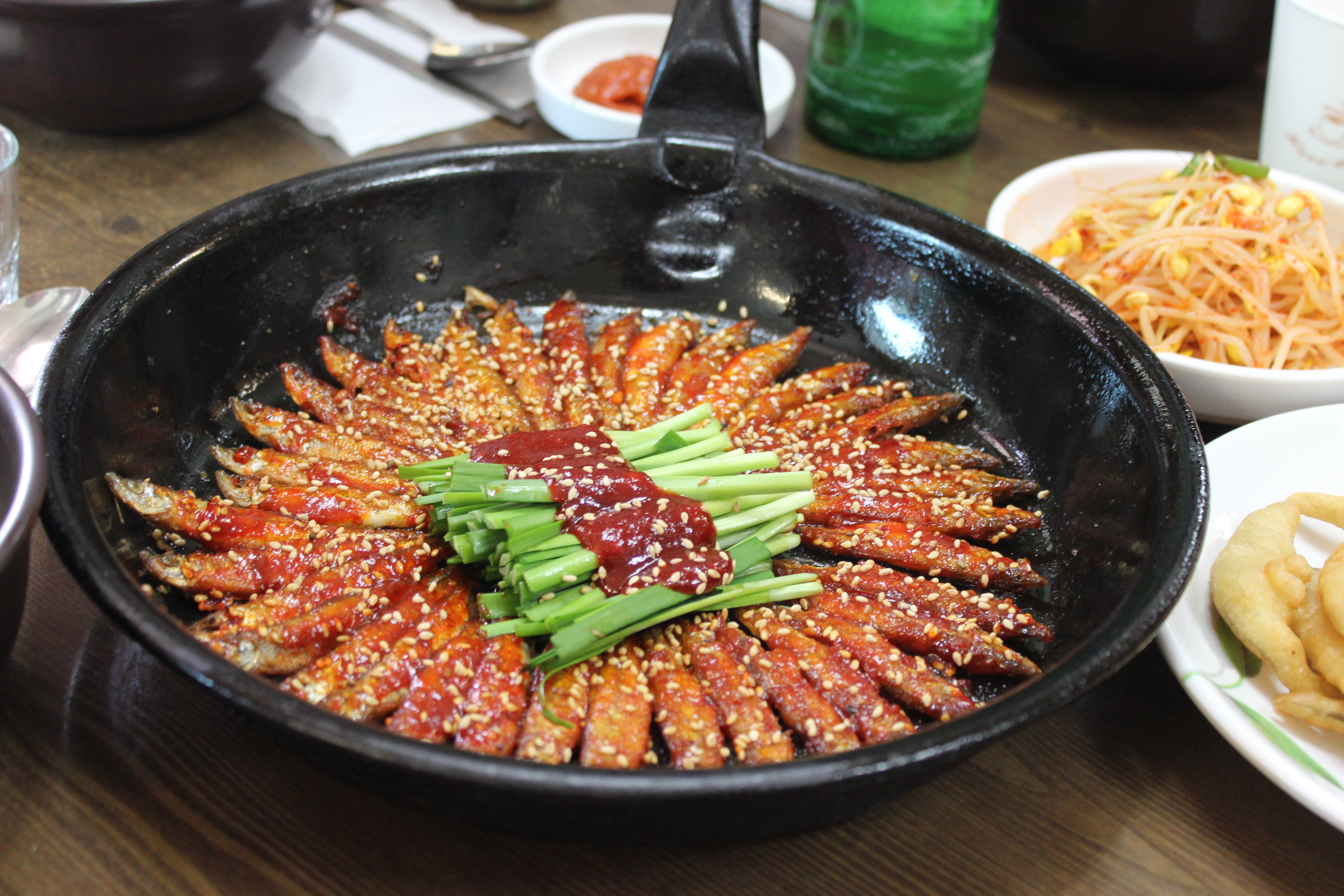
Dori-baengbaengi (pan-fried freshwater minnow)

Zacco platypus are used as bait for sport-fishing for larger fish. They are popular for fly fishers and are caught for consumption. Males are used for aquariums because of their vibrant coloring.
