= Ancherythroculter lini =

Scientific classification
- Kingdom: Animalia
- Phylum: Chordata
- Class: Actinopterygii
- Order: Cypriniformes
- Family: Xenocyprididae
- Genus: Ancherythroculter
- Species: A. lini

Binomial name
- Ancherythroculter lini Y. L. Luo, 1994

Species of fish

Ancherythroculter lini is a species of freshwater ray-finned fish belonging to the family Xenocyprididae, the East Asian minnows or sharpbellies. This species is found in the Zhujiang River in China and was described in 1994. The specific name honours the Chinese ichthyologist Lin Shu-Yen.
