= Hemiculterella macrolepis =

Conservation status
- Data Deficient (IUCN 3.1)

Scientific classification
- Kingdom: Animalia
- Phylum: Chordata
- Class: Actinopterygii
- Order: Cypriniformes
- Family: Xenocyprididae
- Genus: Hemiculterella
- Species: H. macrolepis

Binomial name
- Hemiculterella macrolepis Y. R. Chen, 1989

Species of fish

Hemiculterella macrolepis is a species of freshwater ray-finned fish belonging to the family Xenocyprididae, the East Asian minnows or sharpbellies. It is found in Laos and in the Mekong in the Yunnan province of China. Its maximum length is 13.5 centimetres (5.3 in).
