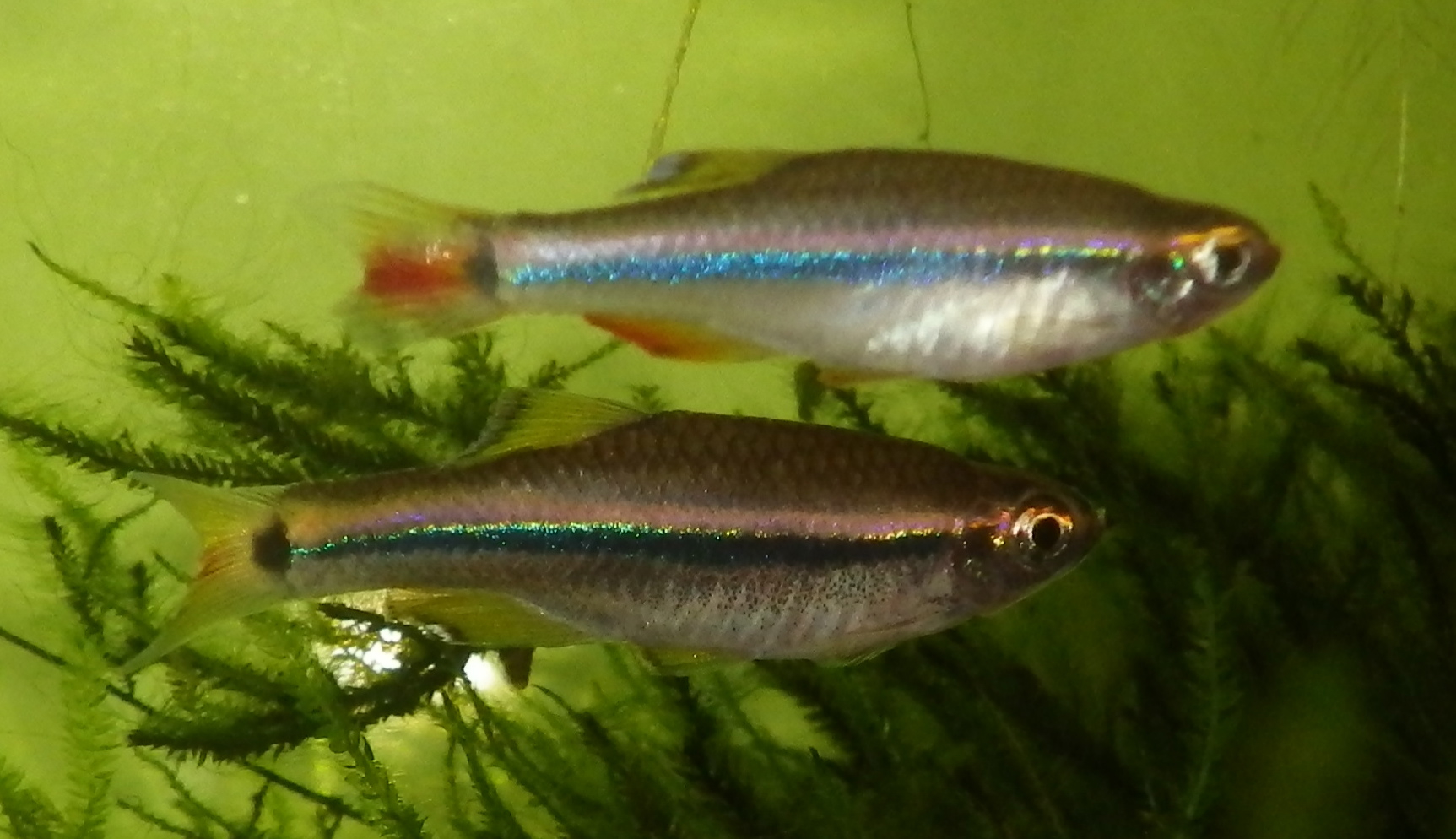

Conservation status
- Data Deficient (IUCN 3.1)

Scientific classification
- Kingdom: Animalia
- Phylum: Chordata
- Class: Actinopterygii
- Order: Cypriniformes
- Family: Xenocyprididae
- Genus: Alligarina
- Species: A. thacbaensis

Binomial name
- Alligarina thacbaensis (Nguyen & Ngo, 2001)

Synonyms
- Tanichthys thacbaensis

= Alligarina thacbaensis =

Species of fish

Alligarina thacbaensis is a species of freshwater ray-finned fish belonging to the family Xenocyprididae of the order Cypriniformes. It is native to Vietnam.
