= Distoechodon compressus =

Conservation status
- Least Concern (IUCN 3.1)

Scientific classification
- Kingdom: Animalia
- Phylum: Chordata
- Class: Actinopterygii
- Order: Cypriniformes
- Family: Xenocyprididae
- Genus: Distoechodon
- Species: D. compressus

Binomial name
- Distoechodon compressus (Nichols, 1925)

Synonyms
- Xenocypris compressus Nichols, 1925

Species of fish

Distoechodon compressus is a species of freshwater ray-finned fish belonging to the family Xenocyprididae, the East Asian minnows or sharpbellies. This species is found in costal rivers such as the Min Jiang, Jiulong Jiang, Ting Jiang and Ao Jiang in Fujian, Zhejiang and Jiangsu provinces in China and in the Yilan and Jilong Rivers in northern Taiwan.
