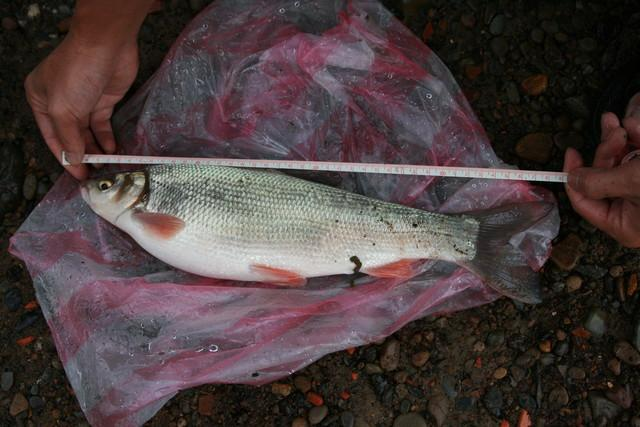

Conservation status
- Least Concern (IUCN 3.1)

Scientific classification
- Kingdom: Animalia
- Phylum: Chordata
- Class: Actinopterygii
- Order: Cypriniformes
- Family: Xenocyprididae
- Genus: Distoechodon
- Species: D. tumirostris

Binomial name
- Distoechodon tumirostris Peters, 1881

Synonyms
- Xenocypris tumirostris (Peters, 1881); Xenocypris tumirostris multispinnis Bănărescu, 1970

= Distoechodon tumirostris =

Species of fish

Distoechodon tumirostris is a species of freshwater ray-finned fish belonging to the family Xenocyprididae, the East Asian minnows or sharpbellies. It inhabits China and Taiwan. Its habitat is inland wetlands and it is used for food.
