= Ancherythroculter kurematsui =

Scientific classification
- Kingdom: Animalia
- Phylum: Chordata
- Class: Actinopterygii
- Order: Cypriniformes
- Family: Xenocyprididae
- Genus: Ancherythroculter
- Species: A. kurematsui

Binomial name
- Ancherythroculter kurematsui (Sh. Kimura, 1934)

Species of fish

Ancherythroculter kurematsui s a species of freshwater ray-finned fish belonging to the family Xenocyprididae, the East Asian minnows or sharpbellies. This species occurs in the Yangtze in China.

Ancherythroculter kurematsui honors U. Kurematsu, Japanese General Council of Chengtu (now Chingdu), capital of Sichuan Province, China, where it occurs in its specific name. This species was first formally described in 1934 by the Japanese ichthyologist Shigeru Kimura.
