= Xenocypris macrolepis =

Conservation status
- Least Concern (IUCN 3.1)

Scientific classification
- Kingdom: Animalia
- Phylum: Chordata
- Class: Actinopterygii
- Order: Cypriniformes
- Family: Xenocyprididae
- Genus: Xenocypris
- Species: X. macrolepis

Binomial name
- Xenocypris macrolepis Bleeker, 1871

Species of fish

Xenocypris macrolepis, also known as the yellowfin, is a species of is a genus of freshwater ray-finned fish belonging to the family Xenocyprididae, the East Asian minnows or sharpbellies. The fish is found in the Amur River and Vietnam. The fish is usually 10 cm (3.9 in) long (SL), the largest specimen of the fish ever recorded was 34.6 cm (13.6 in) long (SL).
