= Alligarina lini =

Conservation status
- Critically Endangered (IUCN 3.1)

Scientific classification
- Kingdom: Animalia
- Phylum: Chordata
- Class: Actinopterygii
- Division: Teleostei
- Order: Cypriniformes
- Family: Xenocyprididae
- Genus: Alligarina
- Species: A. lini

Binomial name
- Alligarina lini (Weitzman & Chan, 1966)

Synonyms
- Aphyocypris lini (Weitzman & Chan, 1966); Hemigrammocypris lini Weitzman & Chan, 1966; Aphyocypris pooni S. Y. Lin, 1939

Species of fish

Alligarina lini, the garnet minnow or Venus minnow, is a species of freshwater ray-finned fish belonging to the family Xenocyprididae, the East Asian minnows or sharpbellies. This species is endemic to China. It was first collected from Hong Kong by A.W. Herre in 1936. The introduction of mosquitofish (Gambusia affinis) and habitat destruction caused the extirpation of this species from Hong Kong and the species was considered to be extinct in the wild. The specific name of this fish honors the Chinese ichthyologist Lin Shu-Yen (1903–1974).

== Description ==
Alligarina lini is a small fish which has a yellowish-brown body with a bluish back and a white underside which are separated by a series of parallel stripes with the middle stripe being reddish-yellow, a bluish black stripe above and an iridescent green line below it. There is a large blue spot, edged with gold at the base of the caudal fin while the fins are white. It has pelvic scutes which run from the base of the pelvic fin to the anus. There is no lateral line but there are 30–32 scales along lateral axis. Adults grow to 50 mm (2.0 in) total length. It has three spines and seven soft rays in the dorsal fin with three spines and eight soft rays in the anal fin.

== Distribution ==
This species is endemic to southern China and it was first recorded in Fanling in the New Territories of Hong Kong in 1939, and was found in the Tai Mo Shan area in 1992, but since then there have been no records in the wild.

== Habitat ==
Alligarina lini is a benthopelagic fish species which lives ditches and rivers where there is clear, shallow water with dense aquatic vegetation. Spawning occurs in open water with sandy and gravel substrates.

== Conservation ==
The decline in the wild populations of Alligarina lini is thought to be due to habitat destruction by human development such as the construction of hydroelectric projects, water pollution and deforestation. They were possibly also affected by competition from introduced fish species such as the mosquitofish. The only currently known population of the garnet minnow are in captive breeding facilities in Hong Kong, Macau and some other southeastern Asia countries where they are bred for export in the aquarium trade. It is possible that the species could be reintroduced to the wild using captive bred fish after habitat restoration and the removal of invasive alien competitors.
