= Xenocypris fangi =

Conservation status
- Near Threatened (IUCN 3.1)

Scientific classification
- Kingdom: Animalia
- Phylum: Chordata
- Class: Actinopterygii
- Order: Cypriniformes
- Family: Xenocyprididae
- Genus: Xenocypris
- Species: X. fangi

Binomial name
- Xenocypris fangi T. L. Tchang, 1930

Species of fish

Xenocypris fangi is a species of freshwater ray-finned fish belonging to the family Xenocyprididae, the East Asian minnows or sharpbellies. It has a maximum total length of 20.0 centimetres (7.9 in) and a common standard length of 17.0 centimetres (6.7 in). It inhabits the upper Yangtze and is considered harmless to humans.
