= Metzia alba =

Conservation status
- Data Deficient (IUCN 3.1)

Scientific classification
- Kingdom: Animalia
- Phylum: Chordata
- Class: Actinopterygii
- Order: Cypriniformes
- Family: Xenocyprididae
- Genus: Metzia
- Species: M. alba

Binomial name
- Metzia alba (T. T. Nguyen, 1991)

Synonyms
- Rasborinus albus (T. T. Nguyen, 1991

Species of fish

Metzia alba is a species of freshwater ray-finned fish belonging to the family Xenocyprididae, the East Asian minnows or sharpbellies. This species is endemic to Viet Nam.
