= Pseudolaubuca hotaya =

Conservation status
- Vulnerable (IUCN 3.1)

Scientific classification
- Kingdom: Animalia
- Phylum: Chordata
- Class: Actinopterygii
- Order: Cypriniformes
- Suborder: Cyprinoidei
- Family: Xenocyprididae
- Genus: Pseudolaubuca
- Species: P. hotaya

Binomial name
- Pseudolaubuca hotaya Đ. Y. Mai, 1978

Species of fish

Pseudolaubuca hotaya is a species of freshwater ray-finned fish from the family Xenocyprididae, the East Asian minnows or sharpbellies, from south east Asia. It occurs in northern Vietnam.
