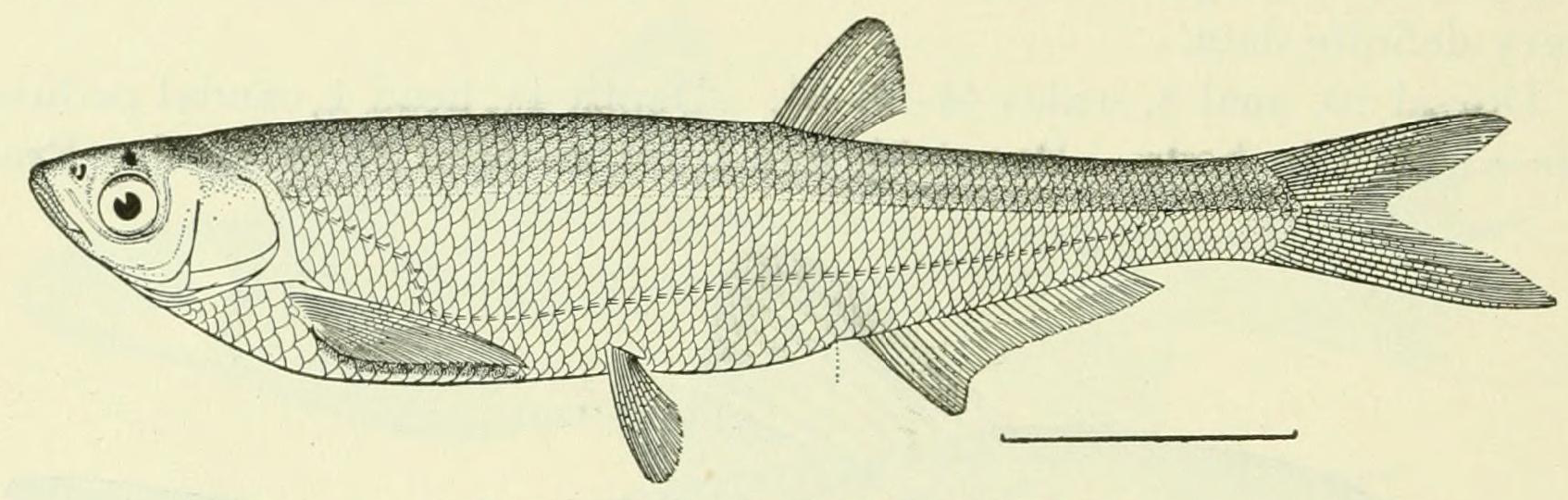

Conservation status
- Least Concern (IUCN 3.1)

Scientific classification
- Kingdom: Animalia
- Phylum: Chordata
- Class: Actinopterygii
- Order: Cypriniformes
- Suborder: Cyprinoidei
- Family: Xenocyprididae
- Genus: Pseudolaubuca
- Species: P. sinensis

Binomial name
- Pseudolaubuca sinensis Bleeker, 1864

Synonyms
- Parapelecus argenteus Günther, 1889; Parapelecus machaerius Abbott, 1901; Pseudolaubuca sinensis machaerius (Abbott, 1901); Chela nicholsi Fowler, 1923; Parapelecus nicholsi (Fowler, 1923); Parapelecus fukiensis Nichols, 1926; Parapelecus tungchowensis Tchang, 1932; Pseudolaubuca sinensis vietnamensis Mai, 1978

= Pseudolaubuca sinensis =

Species of fish

Pseudolaubuca sinensis is a species of freshwater ray-finned fish from the family Xenocyprididae, the East Asian minnows or sharpbellies. It occurs in China and Vietnam.
