= Megalobrama skolkovii =

Scientific classification
- Kingdom: Animalia
- Phylum: Chordata
- Class: Actinopterygii
- Order: Cypriniformes
- Family: Xenocyprididae
- Genus: Megalobrama
- Species: M. skolkovii

Binomial name
- Megalobrama skolkovii Dybowski, 1872

Species of fish

Megalobrama skolkovii is a species of freshwater ray-finned fish belonging to the family Xenocyprididae, the East Asian minnows or sharpbellies. It is the type species of the genus Megalobrama. This species is found in the upper reaches of Yangtze.
