= Toxabramis maensis =

Conservation status
- Data Deficient (IUCN 3.1)

Scientific classification
- Kingdom: Animalia
- Phylum: Chordata
- Class: Actinopterygii
- Order: Cypriniformes
- Family: Xenocyprididae
- Genus: Toxabramis
- Species: T. maensis

Binomial name
- Toxabramis maensis H. D. Nguyễn & N. A. Dương, 2006

Synonyms
- Toxabramis nhatleensis H. D. Nguyễn, Đ. H. Trần & T. T. Tạ, 2006

Species of fish

Toxabramis maensis is a species of ray-finned fish in the genus Toxabramis. It is found in Vietnam.
