= Siniichthys varpachovskii =

Scientific classification
- Kingdom: Animalia
- Phylum: Chordata
- Class: Actinopterygii
- Order: Cypriniformes
- Suborder: Cyprinoidei
- Family: Xenocyprididae
- Genus: Siniichthys
- Species: S. varpachovskii

Binomial name
- Siniichthys varpachovskii (A. M. Nikolskii, 1903)

Species of fish

Siniichthys varpachovskii is a species of freshwater ray-finned fish belonging to the family Xenocyprididae, the East Asian minnows or sharpbellies. This fish is found in the Khalkh River and Lake Buir in Mongolia and Lake Hulun in China. It may also occur in the upper drainage of the Argun River in Russia and China.

== Footnotes ==
- Froese, Rainer; Pauly, Daniel (eds.). "Hemiculter varpachovskii". FishBase.
