= Metzia bounthobi =

Scientific classification
- Kingdom: Animalia
- Phylum: Chordata
- Class: Actinopterygii
- Order: Cypriniformes
- Family: Xenocyprididae
- Genus: Metzia
- Species: M. bounthobi

Binomial name
- Metzia bounthobi Shibukawa, Phousavanh, Phongsa & Iwata, 2012

Species of fish

Metzia bounthobi is a species of freshwater ray-finned fish belonging to the family Xenocyprididae, the East Asian minnows or sharpbellies. This species is only known from the Ou River basin in Phongsaly and Luang Prabang provinces in Laos.
