= Hemiculterella sauvagei =

Conservation status
- Least Concern (IUCN 3.1)

Scientific classification
- Kingdom: Animalia
- Phylum: Chordata
- Class: Actinopterygii
- Division: Teleostei
- Order: Cypriniformes
- Family: Xenocyprididae
- Genus: Hemiculterella
- Species: H. sauvagei

Binomial name
- Hemiculterella sauvagei Warpachowski, 1888

Synonyms
- Nicholsiculter rendahli H. W. Wu, 1930

Species of fish

Hemiculterella sauvagei is a species of freshwater ray-finned fish belonging to the family Xenocyprididae, the East Asian minnows or sharpbellies. This fish lives in inland wetlands of China. It has a maximum length of 14.0 centimetres (5.5 in) and a common length of 12.0 centimetres (4.7 in). Its numbers are declining; however, it is not considered threatened or endangered.
