= Distoechodon macrophthalmus =

Conservation status
- Endangered (IUCN 3.1)

Scientific classification
- Kingdom: Animalia
- Phylum: Chordata
- Class: Actinopterygii
- Order: Cypriniformes
- Family: Xenocyprididae
- Genus: Distoechodon
- Species: D. macrophthalmus

Binomial name
- Distoechodon macrophthalmus Y. H. Zhao, F. F. Kullander, S. O. Kullander & C. G. Zhang, 2009

Species of fish

Distoechodon macrophthalmus, the red-wing fish, is a species of freshwater ray-finned fish belonging to the family Xenocyprididae, the East Asian minnows or sharpbellies. This species is only known from Chenghai Lake in the Yangtze basin in Yunnan. This lake has a decreasing water level and declining water quality, as well as invasive fish. These threats are causing a continued decline in the habitat of this species and so the Salangidae has assessed it as Endangered.
