= Ancherythroculter daovantieni =

Conservation status
- Data Deficient (IUCN 3.1)

Scientific classification
- Kingdom: Animalia
- Phylum: Chordata
- Class: Actinopterygii
- Order: Cypriniformes
- Family: Xenocyprididae
- Genus: Ancherythroculter
- Species: A. daovantieni

Binomial name
- Ancherythroculter daovantieni (Bănărescu, 1967)

Species of fish

Ancherythroculter daovantieni is a species of freshwater ray-finned fish belonging to the family Xenocyprididae, the East Asian minnows or sharpbellies, described in 1967. It is native to Vietnam.

Named in honor of biologist and professor Dao Van Tien, Hanoi, who provided the type specimen.
