= Ancherythroculter wangi =

Scientific classification
- Kingdom: Animalia
- Phylum: Chordata
- Class: Actinopterygii
- Order: Cypriniformes
- Family: Xenocyprididae
- Genus: Ancherythroculter
- Species: A. wangi

Binomial name
- Ancherythroculter wangi (T. L. Tchang, 1932)

Species of fish

Ancherythroculter wangi is a species of freshwater ray-finned fish belonging to the family Xenocyprididae, the East Asian minnows or sharpbellies. It lives in the upper Changjiang River in China.

The specific name of this fish honors Mr. F. T. Wang (no other information given), who collected the type specimen.
