= Atrilinea roulei =

Conservation status
- Least Concern (IUCN 3.1)

Scientific classification
- Kingdom: Animalia
- Phylum: Chordata
- Class: Actinopterygii
- Order: Cypriniformes
- Family: Xenocyprididae
- Genus: Atrilinea
- Species: A. roulei

Binomial name
- Atrilinea roulei (H. W. Wu, 1931)

Synonyms
- Barilius chenchiwei Y. T. Chu, 1931; Barilus roulei H. W. Wu, 1931

Species of fish

Atrilinea roulei, the black-stripe minnow, is a species of freshwater ray-finned fishes belonging to the family Xenocyprididae. This species is found in the Qiantang Jiang in Zhejiang; the Tayaoshan nature reserve and Shiwandashan in Guangxi); and also in Anhui. The maximum published standard length of this fish is 9.2 cm (3.6 in). The specific name of this species honours the French zoologist Louis Roule who was the chair of the ichthyology and herpetology departments, Muséum national d'Histoire naturelle in Paris, where Wu conducted his studies.
