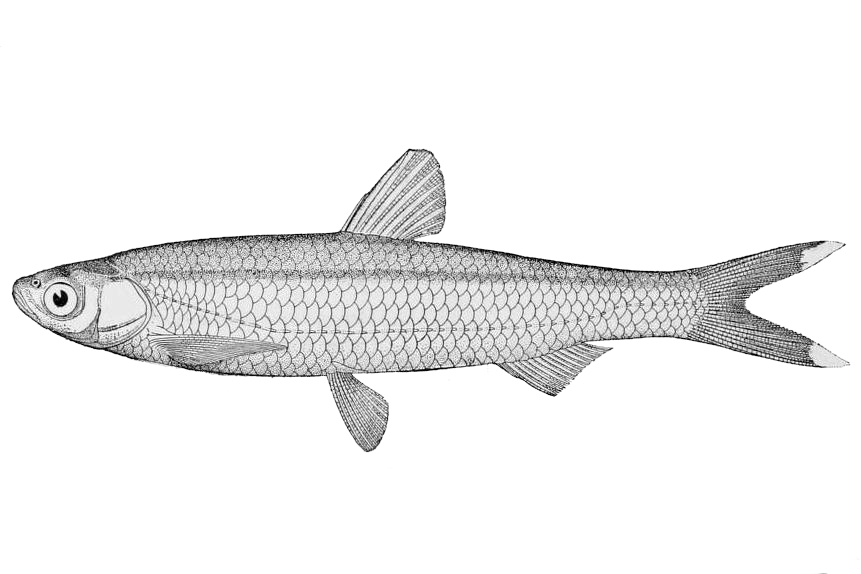

Scientific classification
- Domain: Eukaryota
- Kingdom: Animalia
- Phylum: Chordata
- Class: Actinopterygii
- Order: Cypriniformes
- Suborder: Cyprinoidei
- Family: Xenocyprididae
- Genus: Toxabramis
- Species: T. argentifer

Binomial name
- Toxabramis argentifer J. F. Abbott, 1901

= Toxabramis argentifer =

Species of fish

Toxabramis argentifer is a species of ray-finned fish in the genus Toxabramis. It is found in China.
