= Sinibrama affinis =

Conservation status
- Least Concern (IUCN 3.1)

Scientific classification
- Kingdom: Animalia
- Phylum: Chordata
- Class: Actinopterygii
- Division: Teleostei
- Order: Cypriniformes
- Suborder: Cyprinoidei
- Family: Xenocyprididae
- Genus: Sinibrama
- Species: S. affinis

Binomial name
- Sinibrama affinis (Vaillant, 1892)

Synonyms
- Chanodichthys affinis Vaillant, 1892; Megalobrama affinis (Vaillant, 1892); Megalobrama melrosei Chevey & Lemasson, 1937; Sinibrama melrosi Chen, 1989

Species of fish

Sinibrama affinis is a species of ray-finned fish in the genus Sinibrama. It is found in rivers in southern China (Guangdong, Guangxi, Hainan, Yunnan), northern Vietnam, and Laos.
