= Xenocypris medius =

Scientific classification
- Kingdom: Animalia
- Phylum: Chordata
- Class: Actinopterygii
- Order: Cypriniformes
- Family: Xenocyprididae
- Genus: Xenocypris
- Species: X. medius

Binomial name
- Xenocypris medius (Ōshima, 1920)

Synonyms
- Leuciscus medius Oshima, 1920

Species of fish

Xenocypris medius is a species of freshwater ray-finned fish belonging to the family Xenocyprididae, the East Asian minnows or sharpbellies. This fish is endemic to Taiwan.
