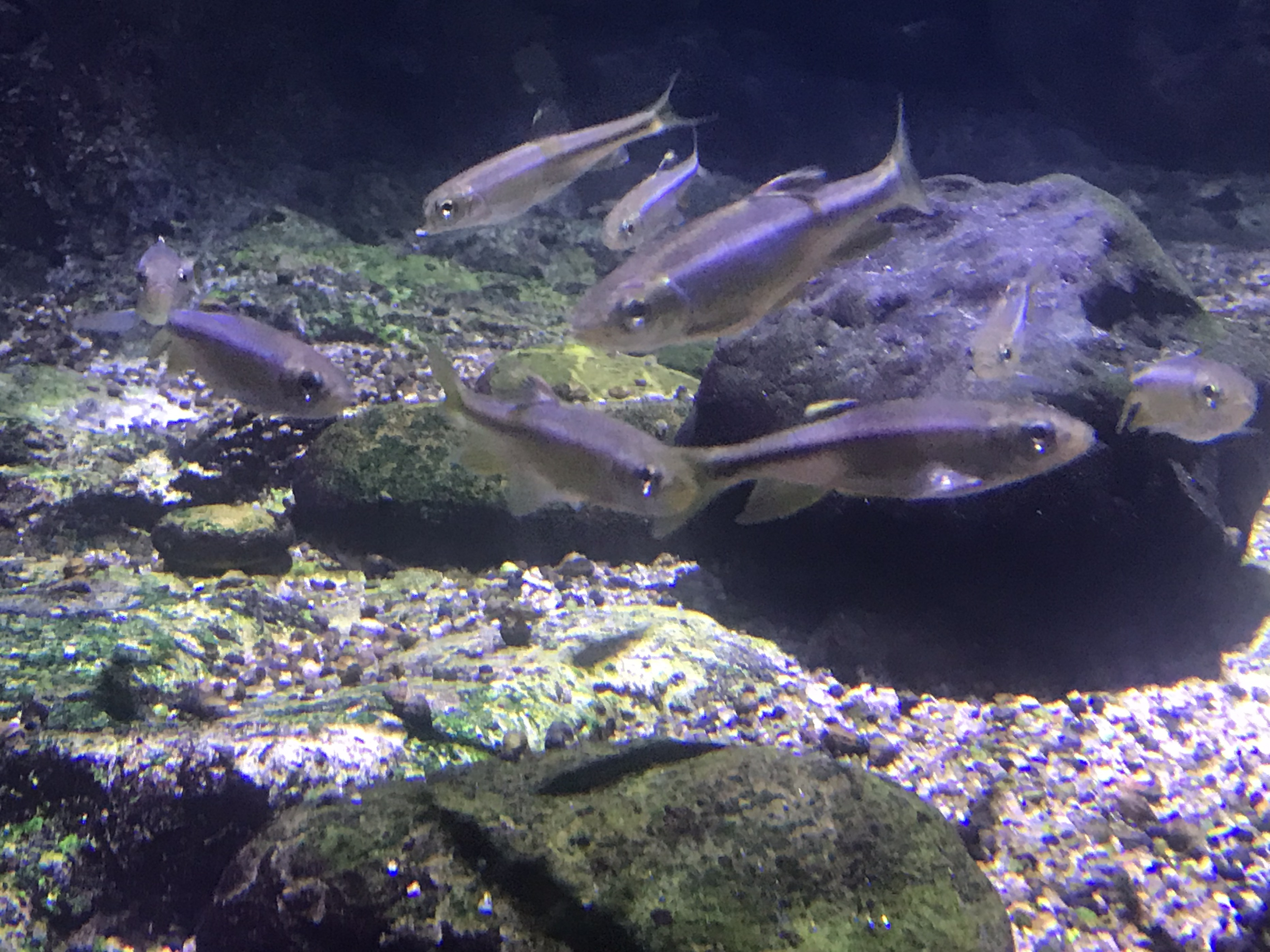

Scientific classification
- Kingdom: Animalia
- Phylum: Chordata
- Class: Actinopterygii
- Division: Teleostei
- Order: Cypriniformes
- Family: Xenocyprididae
- Genus: Nipponocypris
- Species: N. koreanus

Binomial name
- Nipponocypris koreanus (I. S. Kim, M. K. Oh & K. Hosoya, 2005)

Synonyms
- Zacco koreanus Kim, Oh & Hosoya, 2005

= Nipponocypris koreanus =

Species of fish

Nipponocypris koreanus, locally known as the chamgalgyeoni and commonly known as the dark chub, is a species of freshwater ray-finned fish belonging to the family Xenocyprididae, the East Asian minnows or sharpbellies. It inhabits South Korea and has a maximum length of 22.1 centimetres (8.7 in) and a maximum published weight of 51.02 grams (1.800 oz).
