= Toxabramis hoffmanni =

Conservation status
- Data Deficient (IUCN 3.1)

Scientific classification
- Kingdom: Animalia
- Phylum: Chordata
- Class: Actinopterygii
- Order: Cypriniformes
- Family: Xenocyprididae
- Genus: Toxabramis
- Species: T. hoffmanni

Binomial name
- Toxabramis hoffmanni S. Y. Lin, 1934

Species of fish

Toxabramis hoffmanni is a species of ray-finned fish in the genus Toxabramis. It is found in Guangxi, China.
