= Xenocypris davidi =

Scientific classification
- Kingdom: Animalia
- Phylum: Chordata
- Class: Actinopterygii
- Order: Cypriniformes
- Family: Xenocyprididae
- Genus: Xenocypris
- Species: X. davidi

Binomial name
- Xenocypris davidi Bleeker, 1871

Species of fish

Xenocypris davidi (Chinese: 黃尾鯝) is a freshwater fish native to the Pearl River, Hainan Island, the Yangtze River, the Yellow River and the southeast coast of China. It is the subject of artisanal fishing, sport fishing, and a nascent aquaculture attempt.

== Description ==
Xenocypris davidi is a small to medium-sized fish that grows in fresh water, living in the middle and lower layers of the water body. It has a slightly flat body, with a small and pointed head. Its mouth is round and protruding, and the lower jaw has a developed horny edge.

Its back side is gray, the abdomen white, and there is a pale yellow plaque on the trailing edge of the lid. It mainly feeds on plant debris, humus and algae, of which maximum length is 400 mm, and the average fish reaches about 200 mm in 2 years.
