= Sinibrama taeniatus =

Scientific classification
- Kingdom: Animalia
- Phylum: Chordata
- Class: Actinopterygii
- Order: Cypriniformes
- Suborder: Cyprinoidei
- Family: Xenocyprididae
- Genus: Sinibrama
- Species: S. taeniatus

Binomial name
- Sinibrama taeniatus (Nichols, 1941)

Synonyms
- Rasborinus taeniatus Nichols, 1941; Sinibrama changi Chang, 1944; Ancherythroculter brevianalis Bănărescu, 1968

Species of fish

Sinibrama taeniatus is a species of ray-finned fish in the genus Sinibrama.
