= Megalobrama elongata =

Scientific classification
- Kingdom: Animalia
- Phylum: Chordata
- Class: Actinopterygii
- Order: Cypriniformes
- Suborder: Cyprinoidei
- Family: Xenocyprididae
- Genus: Megalobrama
- Species: M. elongata

Binomial name
- Megalobrama elongata H. J. Huang & W. Zhang, 1986

Species of fish

Megalobrama elongata is a of freshwater ray-finned fish belonging to the family Xenocyprididae, the East Asian minnows or sharpbellies. This species is found in the Yangtze River basin.
