= Pseudohemiculter dispar =

Conservation status
- Vulnerable (IUCN 3.1)

Scientific classification
- Kingdom: Animalia
- Phylum: Chordata
- Class: Actinopterygii
- Order: Cypriniformes
- Suborder: Cyprinoidei
- Family: Xenocyprididae
- Genus: Pseudohemiculter
- Species: P. dispar

Binomial name
- Pseudohemiculter dispar (Peters, 1881)

Synonyms
- Hemiculter dispar Peters, 1881

Species of fish

Pseudohemiculter dispar is a species of freshwater ray-finned fish from the family Xenocyprididae, the East Asian minnows and sharpbellies, from south east Asia. It occurs in the Mekong and Nam Ma basins in Laos, central and northern Vietnam, and southern China.
