= Sinibrama macrops =

Conservation status
- Least Concern (IUCN 3.1)

Scientific classification
- Domain: Eukaryota
- Kingdom: Animalia
- Phylum: Chordata
- Class: Actinopterygii
- Order: Cypriniformes
- Family: Xenocyprididae
- Genus: Sinibrama
- Species: S. macrops

Binomial name
- Sinibrama macrops (Günther, 1868)

Synonyms
- Chanodichthys macrops Günther, 1868; Megalobrama macrops (Günther 1868); Erythroculter macrophthalmus Berg, 1934; Sinibrama wui polylepis P. L. Yih & C. K. Wu, 1964; Sinibrama wui typus P. L. Yih & C. K. Wu, 1964; Chanodichthys wui Lin, 1932

Species of fish

Sinibrama macrops is a species of ray-finned fish in the genus Sinibrama. It is found in southern and southeastern China (Hong Kong, Guangxi, Guangdong, Hainan, Fujian, Zhejiang) and in Taiwan. It lives in rivers in slow, deep water.
