= Gymnodanio =

Conservation status
- Endangered (IUCN 3.1)

Scientific classification
- Kingdom: Animalia
- Phylum: Chordata
- Class: Actinopterygii
- Order: Cypriniformes
- Family: Xenocyprididae
- Genus: Gymnodanio; Y. F. Chen & S. P. He, 1992
- Species: G. strigatus

Binomial name
- Gymnodanio strigatus Y. F. Chen & S. P. He, 1992

Monotypic genus of fish

Gymnodanio is a monospecific genus of freshwater ray-finned fish belonging to the family Xenocyprididae, the East Asian minnows or sharpbellies. The only species in the genus is Gymnodanio strigatus, a fish only found in the Mekong River in Yunnan, China.
