= Araiocypris =

Scientific classification
- Kingdom: Animalia
- Phylum: Chordata
- Class: Actinopterygii
- Order: Cypriniformes
- Family: Xenocyprididae
- Genus: Araiocypris; Conway & Kottelat, 2008
- Species: A. batodes

Binomial name
- Araiocypris batodes Conway & Kottelat, 2008

Species of fish

Araiocypris is a monospecific genus of freshwater ray-finned fish belonging to the family Xenocyprididae, the East Asian minnows or sharpbellies. The only species in the genus is Araiocypris batodes, a very small fish endemic to Vietnam.
