= Siniichthys =

Scientific classification
- Kingdom: Animalia
- Phylum: Chordata
- Class: Actinopterygii
- Order: Cypriniformes
- Family: Xenocyprididae
- Genus: Siniichthys; Bănărescu, 1970

Type species
- Siniichthys brevirostris Bănărescu, 1970

Genus of fishes

Siniichthys is a genus of freshwater ray-finned fish belonging to the family Xenocyprididae, the East Asian minnows or sharpbellies. These fishes are found in East Asia.

== Species ==
Siniichthys contains the following species:

- Siniichthys bleekeri (Warpachowski, 1887)
- Siniichthys lucidus (Dybowski, 1872)
- Siniichthys varpachovskii (Nikolskii, 1904)
