= Ussuri sharpbelly =

Conservation status
- Least Concern (IUCN 3.1)

Scientific classification
- Kingdom: Animalia
- Phylum: Chordata
- Class: Actinopterygii
- Order: Cypriniformes
- Suborder: Cyprinoidei
- Family: Xenocyprididae
- Genus: Siniichthys
- Species: S. lucidus

Binomial name
- Siniichthys lucidus (Dybowski, 1872)

Synonyms
- Culter lucidus Dybowski, 1872; Hemiculter lucidus (Dybowski, 1872)

Species of fish

The Ussuri sharpbelly (Siniichthys lucidus) is a species of freshwater ray-finned fish belonging to the family Xenocyprididae, the East Asian minnows or sharpbellies. It originates in the Amur River basin in Asia. It was originally described as Culter lucidus by B. I. Dybowski in 1872, and has also been referred to as Hemiculter leucisculus lucidus in scientific literature.

The fish reaches a size up to 25.0 cm (9.8 in) long, and a weight of 70.0 g (2.5 oz).
