= Pogobrama =

Conservation status
- Data Deficient (IUCN 3.1)

Scientific classification
- Kingdom: Animalia
- Phylum: Chordata
- Class: Actinopterygii
- Order: Cypriniformes
- Family: Xenocyprididae
- Genus: Pogobrama; Y. L. Luo, 1995
- Species: P. barbatula

Binomial name
- Pogobrama barbatula (Y. L. Luo & H. J. Huang, 1985)

Synonyms
- Sinibrama barbatula Luo & Huang, 1985

Monotypic genus of fish

Pogobrama is a monospecific genus of freshwater ray-finned fish belonging to the family Xenocyprididae, the East Asian minnows or sharpbellies. The only species in the genus is Pogobrama barbatula which is endemic to China.
