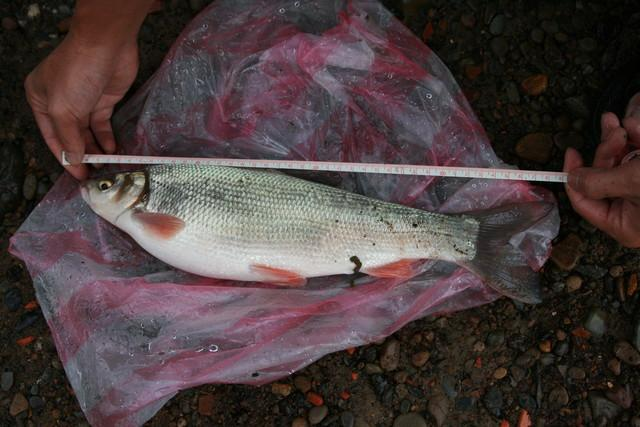
- Distoechodon tumirostris

Scientific classification
- Kingdom: Animalia
- Phylum: Chordata
- Class: Actinopterygii
- Order: Cypriniformes
- Family: Xenocyprididae
- Genus: Distoechodon; W. K. H. Peters, 1881

Type species
- Distoechodon tumirostris Peters, 1881

= Distoechodon =

Genus of fishes

Distoechodon is a genus of freshwater ray-finned fishes belonging to the family Xenocyprididae, the East Asian minnows or sharpbellies. The fishes in this genus are found in East Asia, one species endemic to mainland China and the other in both mainland China and Taiwan.

== Species ==
This genus contains the following species:

- Distoechodon compressus (Nichols, 1925)
- Distoechodon macrophthalmus Y. H. Zhao, F. F. Kullander, S. O. Kullander & C. G. Zhang, 2009 (Red-wing fish)
- Distoechodon tumirostris W. K. H. Peters, 1881
