= Cultrichthys =

Scientific classification
- Domain: Eukaryota
- Kingdom: Animalia
- Phylum: Chordata
- Class: Actinopterygii
- Order: Cypriniformes
- Family: Cyprinidae
- Subfamily: Cultrinae
- Genus: Cultrichthys; H. M. Smith, 1938
- Species: C. compressocorpus

Binomial name
- Cultrichthys compressocorpus (P. L. Yih & C. R. Chu, 1959)

Synonyms
- Culter compressocorpus Yih & Chu, 1959

Species of fish

Cultrichthys compressocorpus is a species of cyprinid fish that is only found in Xinkaihu Lake and Jinbohu Lake in China. It is the only member of its genus.
