= Alligarina =

Scientific classification
- Kingdom: Animalia
- Phylum: Chordata
- Class: Actinopterygii
- Order: Cypriniformes
- Family: Xenocyprididae
- Genus: Alligarina; Endruweit, 2025

Type species
- Alligarina alligarina Endruweit, 2025

Genus of fishes

Alligarina is a genus of freshwater ray-finned fishes belonging to the family Xenocyprididae. This is a small genus with three valid species, all of which are endemic to East Asia (China, Hong Kong and Vietnam).

== Species ==
These are the currently recognized species in this genus:

- Alligarina alligarina Endruweit, 2025
- Alligarina lini (S. H. Weitzman & L. L. Chan, 1966) (Garnet minnow)
- Alligarina thacbaensis (V. H. Nguyễn & S. V. Ngô, 2001)
