= Pseudobrama =

Scientific classification
- Kingdom: Animalia
- Phylum: Chordata
- Class: Actinopterygii
- Order: Cypriniformes
- Suborder: Cyprinoidei
- Family: Xenocyprididae
- Genus: Pseudobrama; Bleeker, 1870
- Species: P. simoni

Binomial name
- Pseudobrama simoni (Bleeker, 1864)

Synonyms
- Acanthobrama simoni Bleeker, 1864; Pseudobrama dumerili Bleeker, 1871; Acanthobrama dumerili (Bleeker, 1871); Culticula emmelas Abbott, 1901

Monotytpic genus of fish

Pseudobrama is a monospecific genus of freshwater ray-finned fish belonging to the family Xenocyprididae, the East Asian minnows or sharpbellies. The only species in the genus is Pseudobrama simoni, a fish endemic to China. This species is found in fresh and brackish water in the Yangtze and other rivers in Eastern China.
