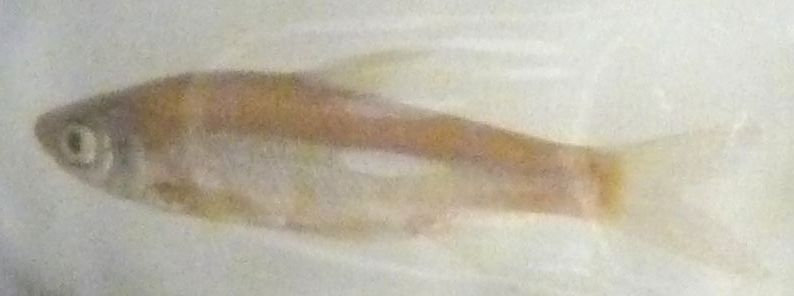

Conservation status
- Endangered (IUCN 3.1)

Scientific classification
- Kingdom: Animalia
- Phylum: Chordata
- Class: Actinopterygii
- Order: Cypriniformes
- Family: Xenocyprididae
- Subfamily: Cultrinae
- Genus: Ischikauia; D. S. Jordan and Snyder, 1900
- Species: I. steenackeri

Binomial name
- Ischikauia steenackeri (Sauvage, 1883)

Synonyms
- Opsariichthys steenackeri Sauvage, 1883

= Ischikauia =

Genus of fishes

Ischikauia is a monospecific genus of freshwater ray-finned fish belonging to the family Xenocyprididae, the East Asian minnows or sharpbellies. The only species in the genus is Ischikauia steenackeri, the wataka, which is endemic to Lake Biwa in Japan. This species was originally described as Opsariichthys steenackeri.

== Sources ==
- Froese, Rainer; Pauly, Daniel (eds.). "Ischikauia steenackeri". FishBase.
