= Metzia =

Scientific classification
- Kingdom: Animalia
- Phylum: Chordata
- Class: Actinopterygii
- Order: Cypriniformes
- Family: Xenocyprididae
- Genus: Metzia; D. S. Jordan & W. F. Thompson, 1914

Type species
- Acheilognathus mesembrinum Jordan & Evermann, 1902

Synonyms
- Rasborinus Oshima, 1920

Genus of fishes

Metzia is a genus of freshwater ray-finned fish belonging to the family Xenocyprididae, the East Asian minnows or sharpbellies. The fishes in this genus are found in Asia. The genus is named in honor of the American ichthyologist Charles William Metz of Stanford University.

== Species ==
These are the currently recognized species in this genus:

- Metzia alba (T. T. Nguyen, 1991)
- Metzia bounthobi Shibukawa, Phousavanh, Phongsa & Iwata, 2012
- Metzia formosae (Ōshima, 1920)
- Metzia hautus (T. T. Nguyen, 1991)
- Metzia lineata (Pellegrin, 1907)
- Metzia longinasus X. Gan, J. H. Lan & E. Zhang, 2009
- Metzia mesembrinum (D. S. Jordan & Evermann, 1902)
- Metzia parva W. Luo, J. P. Sullivan, H. T. Zhao & Z. G. Peng, 2015
