= Hemiculterella =

Scientific classification
- Kingdom: Animalia
- Phylum: Chordata
- Class: Actinopterygii
- Order: Cypriniformes
- Family: Xenocyprididae
- Genus: Hemiculterella; Warpachowski, 1888

Type species
- Hemiculterella sauvagei Warpachowski, 1888

Synonyms
- Semicultur Chu, 1935

Genus of fishes

Hemiculterella is a genus of freshwater ray-finned fishes belonging to the family Xenocyprididae, the East Asian minnows or sharpbellies. The fishes in this genus occur in eastern Asia. There are currently three species in this genus.

== Species ==
The following species are classified in Hemiculterella:

- Hemiculterella macrolepis Y. R. Chen, 1989
- Hemiculterella sauvagei Warpachowski, 1887
- Hemiculterella wui (Ki. Fu. Wang, 1935)
