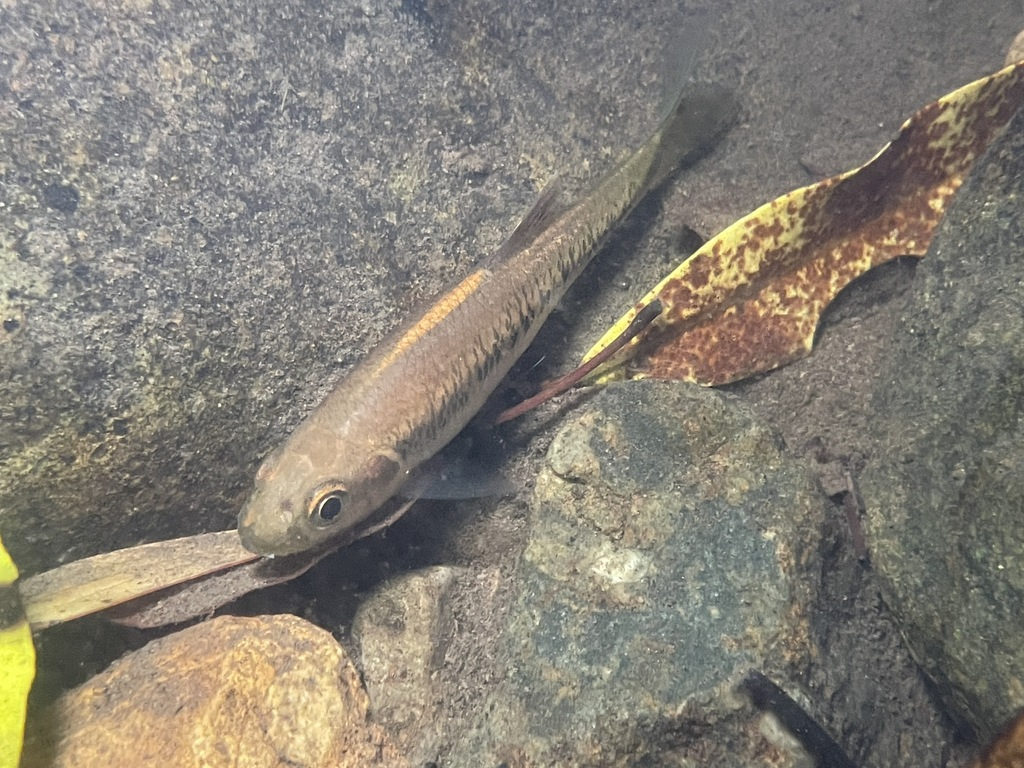
- Predaceous chub in Hong Kong

Conservation status
- Data Deficient (IUCN 3.1)

Scientific classification
- Kingdom: Animalia
- Phylum: Chordata
- Class: Actinopterygii
- Order: Cypriniformes
- Family: Xenocyprididae
- Genus: Parazacco; Y. Y. Chen, 1982
- Species: P. spilurus

Binomial name
- Parazacco spilurus (Günther, 1868)

Synonyms
- Genus: Carinozacco Y. T. Zhu, Y. H. Wang & Y. Ni, 1982; Species: Aspius spilurus Günther, 1868; Zacco spilurus (Günther, 1868); Aspius spilurus fasciatus Koller, 1927; Zacco asperus Nichols & Pope, 1927; Opsariichthys elegans Pellegrin & Chevey, 1934; Parazacco babeensis V. H. Nguyễn & T. D. Nguyễn, 2000; Parazacco vinhi V. H. Nguyen & T. D. Nguyễn, 2000; Parazacco vuquangensis T. T. Nguyen, 1995

= Parazacco =

Monotypic genus of fishes

Parazacco is a monospecific genus of freshwater ray-finned fish belonging to the family Xenocyprididae, the East Asian minnows or sharpbellies. The only species in the genus is Parazacco spilurus, the predaceous chub, a fish found in China and Vietnam. The International Union for Conservation of Nature has classified this species as Data Deficient but Parazacco fasciatus, now regarded as a synonym of P. spilurus, is classified as being Least Concern.
