= Pseudohemiculter =

Scientific classification
- Kingdom: Animalia
- Phylum: Chordata
- Class: Actinopterygii
- Order: Cypriniformes
- Family: Xenocyprididae
- Genus: Pseudohemiculter; Nichols & C. H. Pope, 1927

Type species
- Hemiculter hainanensis Boulenger, 1900

Genus of fishes

Pseudohemiculter is a genus of freshwater ray-finned fish belonging to the family Xenocyprididae, the East Asian minnows or sharpbellies. The four species in this genus are found in eastern Asia.

== Species ==
The following species are classified within Pseudohemiculter:

- Pseudohemiculter dispar (W. K. H. Peters, 1881)
- Pseudohemiculter hainanensis (Boulenger, 1900)
- Pseudohemiculter kweichowensis (D. S. Tang, 1942)
- Pseudohemiculter pacboensis V. H. Nguyễn, 2001
