= Rasborichthys =

Scientific classification
- Kingdom: Animalia
- Phylum: Chordata
- Class: Actinopterygii
- Division: Teleostei
- Order: Cypriniformes
- Family: Xenocyprididae
- Genus: Rasborichthys; Bleeker, 1860
- Species: R. helfricjii

Binomial name
- Rasborichthys helfricjii (Bleeker, 1857)

Synonyms
- Leuciscus helfrichii Bleeker, 1856

Species of fish

Rasborichthys is a monospecific genus of freshwater ray-finned fish belonging to the family Xenocyprididae, the East Asian minnows or sharpbellies. The only species in the genus is Rasborichthys helfrichii a fish found on the islands of Sumatra and Borneo in Southeast Asia.

== Habitat and biology ==
Rasborichthys helfrichii is a tropical freshwater fish found in lakes, rivers and streams. It is classified as a demersal species, meaning that it inhabits or remains close to the bottom of a body of water. The species has a recorded maximum standard length of 9.4 cm, measured from the tip of the snout to the base of the tail fin.
