= Hyla sanchiangensis =

Conservation status
- Least Concern (IUCN 3.1)

Scientific classification
- Kingdom: Animalia
- Phylum: Chordata
- Class: Amphibia
- Order: Anura
- Family: Hylidae
- Genus: Hyla
- Species: H. sanchiangensis

Binomial name
- Hyla sanchiangensis Pope, 1929

Species of amphibian

Hyla sanchiangensis (proposed common name: San Chiang tree frog) is a species of frog in the family Hylidae. It is endemic to central and southern China and known from Fujian, Guangdong, Guangxi, Guizhou, Anhui, Zhejiang, Hunan, Hubei, and Jiangxi provinces. The type locality is "San Chiang" (Chinese: 三港; pinyin: Sāngǎng) in what at present is the Wuyishan City. The type series was collected by Clifford H. Pope during the Third Asiatic Expedition of the American Museum of Natural History in 1926, and described in 1929, along with three other new amphibian species.

== Description ==
Males measure 31–35 mm (1.2–1.4 in) and females 33–38 mm (1.3–1.5 in) in snout–vent length. The back is leaf-green in colour. There are conspicuous black markings on the sides and on the limbs. The skin is smooth. The fingers are slightly webbed whereas the toes are two-thirds webbed. The males have two largish vocal sacks.

The tadpoles grow to 31 mm (1.2 in) total length.

== Habitat and conservation ==
Hyla sanchiangensis live in hilly areas in forest and rice paddies and their vicinity. By daytime they hide inside bamboo tubes or in holes in the ground, coming out in the evening to prey on insects. They are found at elevations of 500–1,560 m (1,640–5,120 ft) above sea level.

Hyla sanchiangensis is a common species. Habitat destruction and degradation are threats to it.
