= Atrilinea =

Scientific classification
- Kingdom: Animalia
- Phylum: Chordata
- Class: Actinopterygii
- Order: Cypriniformes
- Family: Xenocyprididae
- Genus: Atrilinea; Y. T. Chu, 1935

Type species
- Barilius chenchiwei Y. T. Chu, 1931

Genus of fishes

Atrilinea is a genus of freshwater ray-finned fishes belonging to the family Xenocyprididae. This is a small genus with three valid species, all of which are endemic to China.

== Species ==
Atrilinea contains the following species:

- Atrilinea macrolepis S. L. Song & S. M. Fang, 1987
- Atrilinea macrops (S. Y. Lin, 1931)
- Atrilinea roulei (H. W. Wu, 1931) (Black-stripe minnow)
