= Xenocypris =

Xenocypris Temporal range: Pliocene-recent

Scientific classification
- Kingdom: Animalia
- Phylum: Chordata
- Class: Actinopterygii
- Order: Cypriniformes
- Family: Xenocyprididae
- Genus: Xenocypris; Günther, 1868

Type species
- Xenocypris argentea Günther, 1868

Genus of fishes

Xenocypris is a genus of freshwater ray-finned fish belonging to the family Xenocyprididae, the East Asian minnows or sharpbellies. In addition to the extant species, X. yushensis, being known only from fossils, and one, X. yunnanensis, which is critically endangered or recently extinct.

== Species ==
Xenocypris contains the following species:

- Xenocypris davidi Bleeker, 1871
- Xenocypris fangi T. L. Tchang, 1930
- Xenocypris hupeinensis (P. L. Yih, 1964)
- Xenocypris macrolepis Bleeker, 1871
- Xenocypris medius (Ōshima, 1920)
- Xenocypris schisturus (Oshima, 1920)
- Xenocypris yunnanensis Nichols, 1925
- †Xenocypris yushensis Liu & Su, 1962 (Pliocene Shanxi Province)
