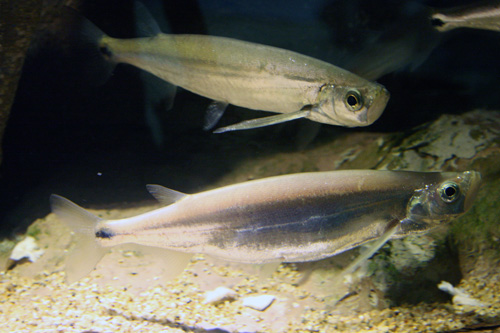

Conservation status
- Least Concern (IUCN 3.1)

Scientific classification
- Kingdom: Animalia
- Phylum: Chordata
- Class: Actinopterygii
- Order: Cypriniformes
- Family: Xenocyprididae
- Genus: Macrochirichthys; Bleeker, 1860
- Species: M. macrochirus

Binomial name
- Macrochirichthys macrochirus (Valenciennes, 1844)

Synonyms
- Leuciscus macrochirus Valenciennes, 1844; Leuciscus uranoscopus Bleeker, 1850; Macrochirichthys snyderi Fowler, 1905; Macrochirichthys laosensis Fowler, 1934

= Macrochirichthys =

Monotypic genus of fish

Macrochirichthys is a monospecific genus of freshwater ray-finned fish belonging to the family Xenocyprididae, the East Asian minnows or sharpbellies. The only species in the genus is Macrochirichthys macrochirus, the long pectoral-fin minnow and giant sword minnow or freshwater wolf-herring, a fish found in rivers and lakes in Southeast Asia (Vietnam and Thailand to the Greater Sundas) where it is used as a food fish. It is the only member of its genus. It is predatory and reaches up to 1 m (3.3 ft) in length.

== Range in Thailand ==
Found in the south of Thailand, Chao Phraya River, Mekong River, Nan River, Mae Klong River, and Tapee River Basin from Nonthaburi, Ayutthaya, Ratchaburi and Chiang Rai Provinces.

The common names of this species of minnow in Thai are pla fak pra (Thai: ปลาฝักพร้า, pronounced [plāː fàk práː], lit. 'machete fish') and pla darb lao (ปลาดาบลาว, pronounced [plāː dàːp lāːw], lit. 'Laotian blade fish') based on its shape, which resembles a blade or a sword leaf.
