= Luciobrama =

Conservation status
- Data Deficient (IUCN 3.1)

Scientific classification
- Kingdom: Animalia
- Phylum: Chordata
- Class: Actinopterygii
- Division: Teleostei
- Order: Cypriniformes
- Family: Xenocyprididae
- Genus: Luciobrama; Bleeker, 1870
- Species: L. macrocephalus

Binomial name
- Luciobrama macrocephalus (Lacépède, 1803)

Synonyms
- Synodus macrocephalus Lacepède, 1803; Luciobrama typus Bleeker, 1871; Luciobrama longiceps Pellegrin, 1907

Species of fish

Luciobrama is a monospecific genus of freshwater ray-finned fish belonging to the family Xenocyprididae, the East Asian minnows or sharpbellies. The only species in the genus is Luciobrama macrocephala, the long spiky-head carp, a fish that is found in China and Vietnam. It is classified as data deficient by the IUCN. It is found in rivers and lakes. Larger fish, over 30 centimetres (12 in) live nearer the bottom and the smaller specimens are found higher in the water column. They are partially migratory. It has not been recorded from four of its known spawning sites since 1988.
