= Longiculter =

Conservation status
- Data Deficient (IUCN 3.1)

Scientific classification
- Kingdom: Animalia
- Phylum: Chordata
- Class: Actinopterygii
- Order: Cypriniformes
- Family: Xenocyprididae
- Genus: Longiculter; Fowler, 1937
- Species: L. siahi

Binomial name
- Longiculter siahi Fowler, 1937

Monotypic genus of fish

Longiculter is a monospecific genus of freshwater ray-finned fish belonging to the family Xenocyprididae, the East Asian minnows or sharpbellies. The only species in the genus is Longiculter siahi. This fish is found in Southeast Asia where it is found in Cambodia, Laos and Thailand. It is the only member of its genus. It was described by the American ichthyologist Henry Weed Fowler from two specimens collected from central Thailand in 1937. There have been no further records of this species from Thailand and there is some doubt as to the validity of this species. There have been reports of this species from Cambodia in 1985 and from southern Lao PDR but the identification has yet to be confirmed. The IUCN therefore classify this species as Data Deficient.
