= Sinibrama =

Scientific classification
- Kingdom: Animalia
- Phylum: Chordata
- Class: Actinopterygii
- Order: Cypriniformes
- Family: Xenocyprididae
- Genus: Sinibrama; H. W. Wu, 1939

Type species
- Chanodichthys wui Rendahl, 1932

Genus of fishes

Sinibrama of freshwater ray-finned fish belonging to the family Xenocyprididae, the East Asian minnows or sharpbellies. The fihses in this genus are found in southern China, Taiwan, Laos, and Vietnam. These are silvery fishes with deep, laterally compressed bodies, large eyes, and terminal mouths. They tend to grow no larger than 20 cm in standard length.

The taxonomy of the group is frequently disputed, as all forms are very similar with more or less overlapping morphometric data.

== Species ==
The genus contains these species:

- Sinibrama affinis (Vaillant, 1892)
- Sinibrama longianalis Z. G. Xie, C. X. Xie & E. Zhang, 2003
- Sinibrama macrops (Günther, 1868)
- Sinibrama melrosei (Nichols & C. H. Pope, 1927)
- Sinibrama taeniatus (Nichols, 1941)
- Sinibrama wui (Rendahl (de), 1932)
