= Xenocyprioides =

Scientific classification
- Kingdom: Animalia
- Phylum: Chordata
- Class: Actinopterygii
- Order: Cypriniformes
- Family: Xenocyprididae
- Genus: Xenocyprioides; Y.-Y. Chen, 1982

Type species
- Xenocyprioides parvulus Y.-Y. Chen 1982

Genus of fishes

Xenocyprioides is a genus of freshwater ray-finned fish belonging to the family Xenocyprididae, the East Asian minnows or sharpbellies. The fishes in the genus are endemic to China.

== Species ==
Xenocyprioides contains the following species:

- Xenocyprioides carinatus Y.-Y. Chen & H. J. Huang, 1985
- Xenocyprioides parvulus Y.-Y. Chen, 1982
