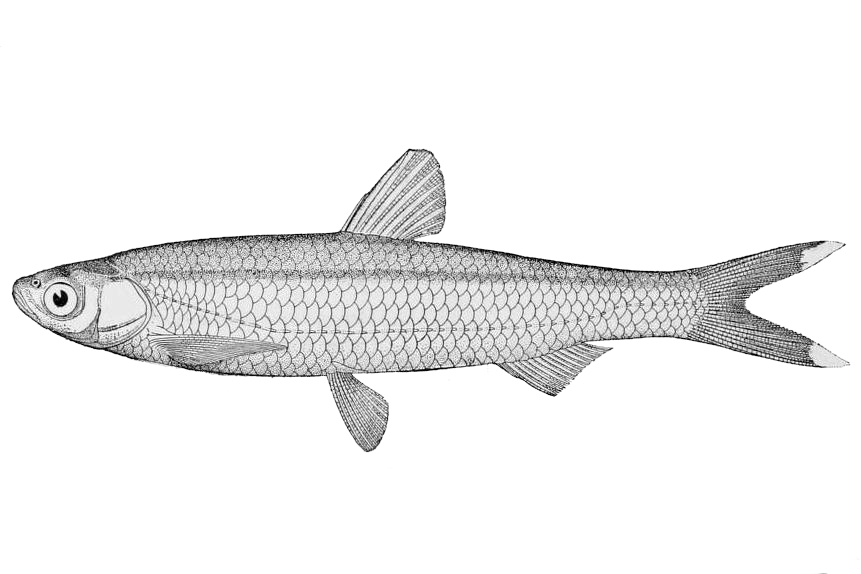
- Toxabramis argentifer

Scientific classification
- Kingdom: Animalia
- Phylum: Chordata
- Class: Actinopterygii
- Order: Cypriniformes
- Family: Xenocyprididae
- Genus: Toxabramis; Günther, 1873

Type species
- Toxabramis swinhonis Günther, 1873

= Toxabramis =

Genus of fishes

Toxabramis is a genus of freshwater ray-finned fish belonging to the family Xenocyprididae, the East Asian minnows or sharpbellies. These fishes are found in Eastern Asia,

== Species ==
Toxabrama contains the following species:

- Toxabramis argentifer J. F. Abbott, 1901
- Toxabramis hoffmanni S. Y. Lin, 1934
- Toxabramis houdemeri Pellegrin, 1932
- Toxabramis maensis H. D. Nguyễn & N. A. Dương, 2006
- Toxabramis swinhonis Günther, 1873
