= Ancherythroculter =

Scientific classification
- Kingdom: Animalia
- Phylum: Chordata
- Class: Actinopterygii
- Order: Cypriniformes
- Family: Xenocyprididae
- Genus: Ancherythroculter; P. L. Yih & C. K. Wu, 1964

Type species
- Chanodichthys kurematsui Kimura, 1934

Genus of fishes

Ancherythroculter is a genus of freshwater ray-finned fish belonging to the family Xenocyprididae, the East Asian minnows or sharpbellies. The fishes in this genus occur in eastern Asia in China and Vietnam. There are currently five recognized species in this genus, though the validity of A. lini was under some doubt.

== Species ==
There are currently five recognized species in this genus:

- Ancherythroculter daovantieni (Bănărescu, 1967)
- Ancherythroculter kurematsui (Sh. Kimura, 1934)
- Ancherythroculter lini Y. L. Luo, 1994
- Ancherythroculter nigrocauda P. L. Yih & C. K. Wu, 1964
- Ancherythroculter wangi (T. L. Tchang, 1932)
