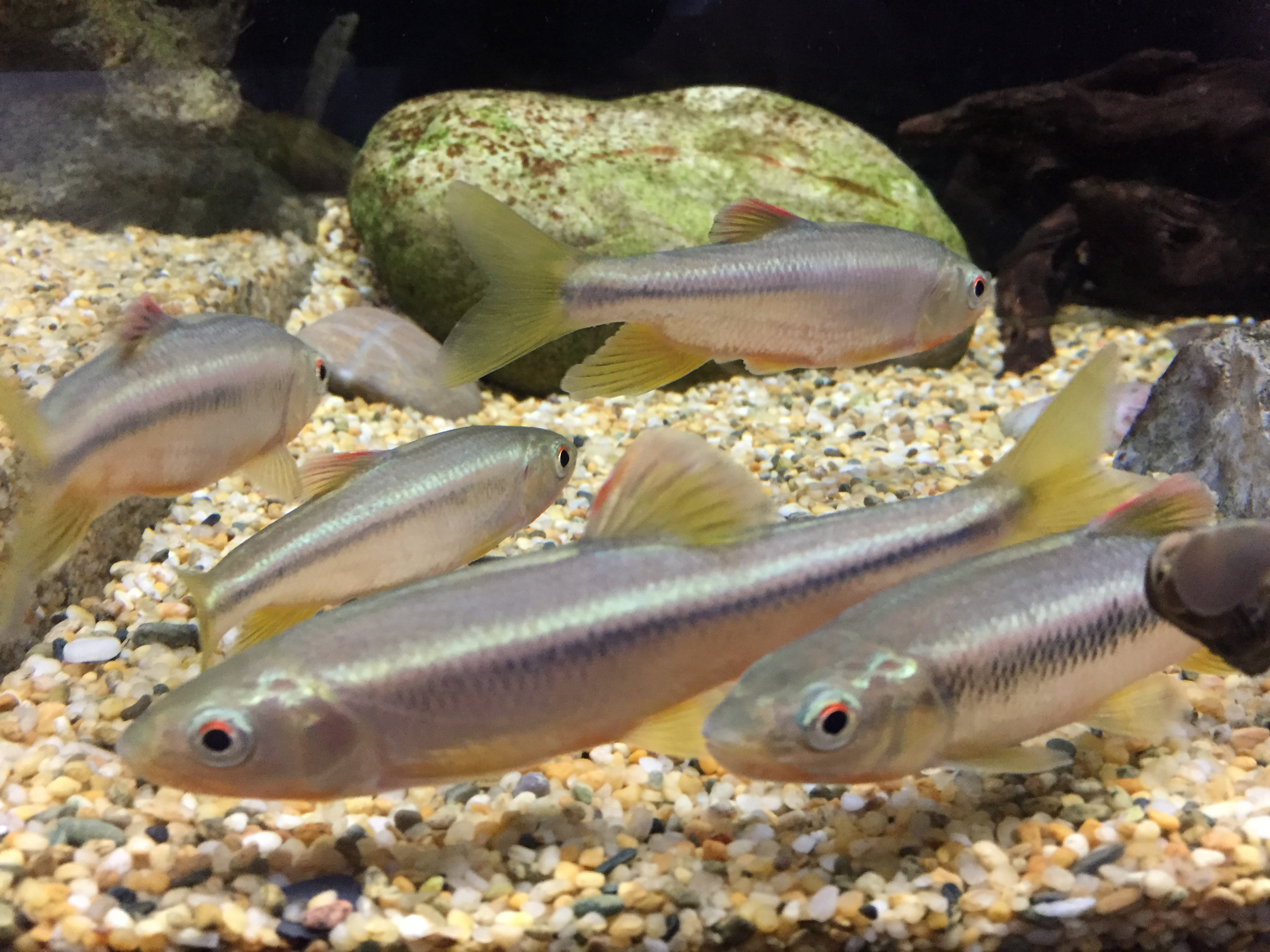
- Nipponocypris temmincki

Scientific classification
- Kingdom: Animalia
- Phylum: Chordata
- Class: Actinopterygii
- Order: Cypriniformes
- Family: Xenocyprididae
- Genus: Nipponocypris; I. S. Chen, J. H. Wu & C. H. Hsu, 2008

Type species
- Leuciscus temminckii Temminck & Schlegel, 1846

= Nipponocypris =

Nipponocypris Temporal range: Pleistocene-Holocene

Genus of fishes

Nipponocypris is a genus of freshwater ray-finned fish belonging to the family Xenocyprididae, the East Asian minnows or sharpbellies. This genus has three extant species from eastern Asia and a fourth, extinct species from Middle Pleistocene-aged freshwater strata from the Kusu Basin in Japan.

== Species ==
Nipponocypris contains the following species:

- Nipponocypris koreanus (I. S. Kim, M. K. Oh & K. Hosoya, 2005)
- Nipponocypris sieboldii (Temminck & Schlegel, 1846)
- †Nipponocypris takayamai Miyata, Yabumoto, and Hirano, 2019
- Nipponocypris temminckii (Temminck & Schlegel, 1846)
