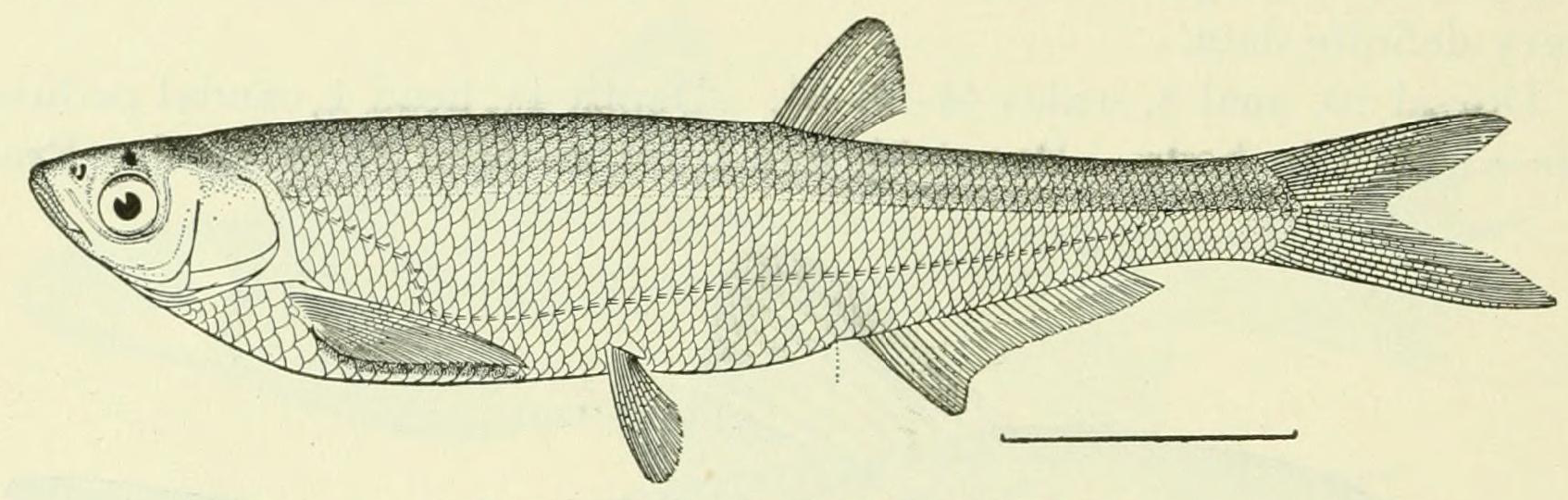
- Pseudolaubuca sinensis, 1864

Scientific classification
- Kingdom: Animalia
- Phylum: Chordata
- Class: Actinopterygii
- Order: Cypriniformes
- Family: Xenocyprididae
- Genus: Pseudolaubuca; Bleeker, 1864

Type species
- Pseudolaubuca sinensis Bleeker, 1864

Synonyms
- Parapelecus Günther, 1889

= Pseudolaubuca =

Genus of fishes

Pseudolaubuca is a genus of freshwater ray-finned fish belonging to the family Xenocyprididae, the East Asian minnows or sharpbellies. These fishes are found in East Asia.

== Species ==
- Pseudolaubuca engraulis (Nichols, 1925)
- Pseudolaubuca hotaya Đ. Y. Mai, 1978
- Pseudolaubuca jouyi (D. S. Jordan & Starks, 1905)
- Pseudolaubuca sinensis Bleeker, 1864
