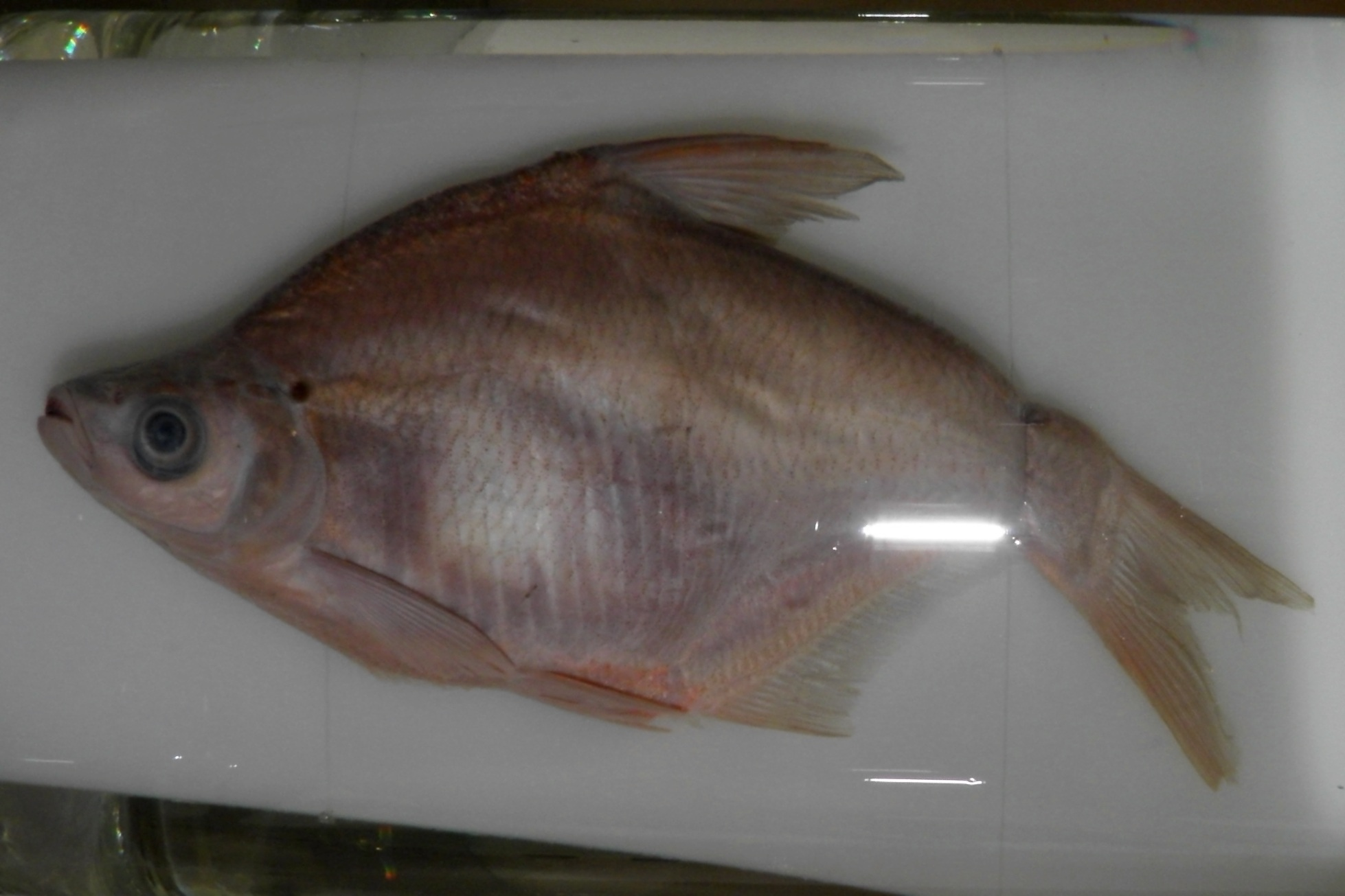
- Black Amur bream, Megalobrama terminalis

Scientific classification
- Kingdom: Animalia
- Phylum: Chordata
- Class: Actinopterygii
- Order: Cypriniformes
- Family: Xenocyprididae
- Genus: Megalobrama; Dybowski, 1872

Type species
- Megalobrama skolkovii Dybowski, 1872

= Megalobrama =

Genus of fishes

Megalobrama is a genus of freshwater ray-finned fish belonging to the family Xenocyprididae, the East Asian minnows or sharpbellies. The fishes in this genus are native to fresh water in China and eastern Russia. The name is derived from the Greek word megalos, meaning "great", and the Old French word breme, a type of freshwater fish.

== Species ==
Megalobrama contains the following species:

- Megalobrama amblycephala P. L. Yih, 1955 (Wuchang bream)
- Megalobrama elongata H. J. Huang & W. Zhang, 1986
- Megalobrama mantschuricus (Basilewsky, 1855)
- Megalobrama pellegrini (T. L. Tchang, 1930)
- Megalobrama skolkovii Dybowski, 1872
- Megalobrama terminalis (J. Richardson, 1846) (black Amur bream)
