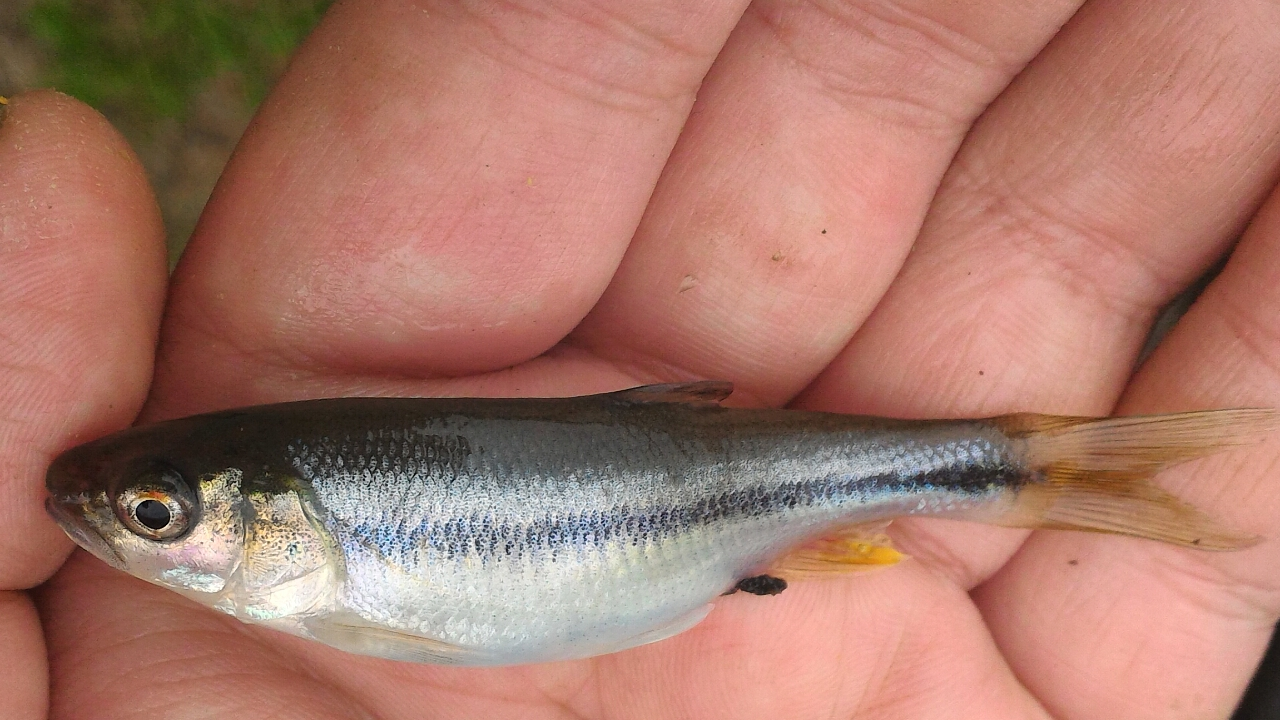
- Candidia barbata

Scientific classification
- Kingdom: Animalia
- Phylum: Chordata
- Class: Actinopterygii
- Order: Cypriniformes
- Family: Xenocyprididae
- Genus: Candidia; D. S. Jordan & R. E. Richardson, 1909

Type species
- Opsariichthys barbatus Regan, 1908

= Candidia =

Genus of fishes

Candidia is a genus of freshwater ray-finned fishes belonging to the family Xenocyprididae. This is a small genus with two valid species, all of which are endemic to Taiwan.

== Species ==
These are the currently recognized species in this genus:

- Candidia barbata (Regan, 1908)
- Candidia pingtungensis I. S. Chen, J. H. Wu & C. H. Hsu, 2008
