= Hainania serrata =

Conservation status
- Data Deficient (IUCN 3.1)

Scientific classification
- Kingdom: Animalia
- Phylum: Chordata
- Class: Actinopterygii
- Order: Cypriniformes
- Suborder: Cyprinoidei
- Family: Xenocyprididae
- Genus: Hainania; Koller, 1927
- Species: H. serrata

Binomial name
- Hainania serrata Koller, 1927

Synonyms
- Hemiculter serratus (Koller, 1927); Hemiculter serracanthus Koller, 1927; Pseudohemiculter serrata (Koller, 1927)

Species of fish

Hainania serrata, also known as the Hainan minnow, is a species of freshwater ray-finned fish belonging to the family Xenocyprididae. the East Asian minnows or sharpbellies. This fish is found in fast flowing hill streams in southern China and Vietnam. It is the only member of the genus Hainania.
