= Clifford H. Pope =

American herpetologist

Clifford Hillhouse Pope
- Born: April 11, 1899; Washington, Georgia, US
- Died: June 3, 1974 (aged 75); Escondido, California, US
- Known for: Study of snakes, reptiles, frogs, salamanders
- Scientific career
- Fields: Herpetologist
- Workplaces: American Museum of Natural History, Field Museum of Natural History
- Doctoral students: none

Clifford Hillhouse Pope (April 11, 1899 – June 3, 1974) was a noted American herpetologist. He was the son of Mark Cooper Pope and Harriett Alexander (Hull) Pope, and grew up in Washington, Georgia. While in college in the summers of 1919 and 1920 Pope went to the New York Zoological Society's Tropical Research Station at Katabo Point British Guiana, maintained by William Beebe. Starting in 1921, after graduating from the University of Virginia, he spent many years in China as part of the Central Asiatic Expeditions of the American Museum of Natural History, accompanying Roy Chapman Andrews on the expedition to the Gobi Desert that first discovered fossilized dinosaur eggs. Pope mastered the Chinese language and made a total of eight expeditions in Chinese territory prior to 1930. In China he gave scientific names to the Kuatun horned toad, Hyla sanchiangensis, Amolops chunganensis, Rana fukienensis, and others. He also did a great deal of work with Karl Patterson Schmidt. Pope worked at the American Museum of Natural History from 1921 to 1934. He was president and journal editor of the American Society of Ichthyologists and Herpetologists in 1935.

In 1927, the Boy Scouts of America made Pope an Honorary Scout, a new category of Scout created that same year. This distinction was given to "American citizens whose achievements in outdoor activity, exploration and worthwhile adventure are of such an exceptional character as to capture the imagination of boys..."

Starting in 1940 Pope worked at the Field Museum of Natural History in Chicago, Illinois, as Curator, Division of Amphibians and Reptiles, where his field efforts focused on plethodontid salamanders in Mexico, California, and the eastern United States. Pope and Archie Carr greatly expanded the knowledge of North American turtles, and Pope was one of the first herpetologists to write factually about the giant snakes for the general public. Pope retired from the Field Museum in 1954. Pope is the author of many books including Snakes Alive and How They Live (1937), Turtles of the United States and Canada (1939), China's Animal Frontier (1940), The Reptile World (1955) and The Giant Snakes (1961). Pope's keelback (Amphiesma popei ), Pope's emo skink (Emoia popei ), and Pope's skink (Eumeces popei ) are named in his honor. Popes' tree viper (Trimeresurus popeiorum) is named in honor of Pope and his wife Sarah H. Pope. A well-known quote from Pope is that "snakes are first cowards, then bluffers, and last of all warriors."
