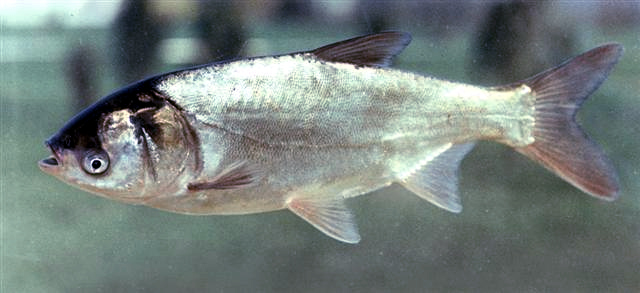
- Hypophthalmichthys molitrix

Scientific classification
- Kingdom: Animalia
- Phylum: Chordata
- Class: Actinopterygii
- Order: Cypriniformes
- Suborder: Cyprinoidei
- Family: Xenocyprididae; Günther, 1868

Synonyms
- Squaliobarbinae

= Xenocyprididae =

Xenocyprididae Temporal range: Middle Eocene to present

Family of fishes

Xenocyprididae is a family of freshwater ray-finned fishes, commonly called the East Asian minnows or sharpbellies. They have a natural distribution in Asia. This taxon, sometimes spelt Xenocypridae, was previously regarded to be a subfamily, Xenocyprinae, of the family Cyprinidae. Cyprinidae sensu lato is now divided into a number of smaller families within the suborder Cyprinoidei, in the order Cypriniformes.

== Taxonomy ==
Xenocyprididae was previously considered to be a part of the family Cyprinidae, along with the Danionidae, Leuciscidae, Tincidae, and other related fish taxa. Eschmeyer's Catalog of Fishes places all of these groups, formerly considered to be subfamilies of the Cyprinidae sensu lato, in the large, widespread and diverse suborder Cyprinoidei, consisting mainly of freshwater ray-finned fish. This conforms with the classification adopted by other authorities. The suborder Cyprinoidei is classified in the order Cypriniformes.

=== Genera ===
Xenocyprididae contains the following valid genera:

- Alligarina Endruweit, 2025
- Anabarilius Cockerell, 1923
- Ancherythroculter P. L. Yih & C. K. Wu, 1964
- Aphyocypris Günther, 1868
- Araiocypris Conway & Kottelat, 2008
- Atrilinea Y. T. Chu, 1935
- Candidia D. S. Jordan & R. E. Richardson 1909
- Chanodichthys Bleeker, 1860
- Ctenopharyngodon Steindachner, 1866
- Culter Basilewsky, 1855
- Distoechodon Peters, 1881
- Elopichthys Bleeker, 1860
- Gymnodanio Y. F. Chen & S. P. He, 1992
- Hainania Koller, 1927
- Hemiculter Bleeker, 1860
- Hemiculterella Warpachowski, 1888
- Hemigrammocypris Fowler, 1910
- Hypophthalmichthys Bleeker, 1860
- Ischikauia D. S. Jordan & Snyder, 1900
- Longiculter Fowler, 1937
- Luciobrama Bleeker, 1870
- Macrochirichthys Bleeker, 1859
- Megalobrama Dybowski, 1872
- Metzia D. S. Jordan & W. F. Thompson, 1914
- Mylopharyngodon Peters, 1881
- Nipponocypris I. S. Chen, J. H. Wu & C. H. Hsu, 2008
- Ochetobius Günther, 1868
- Opsariichthys Bleeker, 1863
- Oxygaster van Hasselt, 1823
- Parabramis Bleeker, 1864
- Paralaubuca Bleeker, 1864
- Parachela Steindachner, 1881
- Pararasbora Regan, 1908
- Parazacco Y. Y. Chen, 1982
- Plagiognathops Berg, 1907
- Pogobrama Y. L. Luo, 1995
- Pseudobrama Bleeker, 1870
- Pseudohemiculter Nichols & C. H. Pope, 1927
- Pseudolaubuca Bleeker, 1864
- Rasborichthys Bleeker, 1859
- Sinibrama H. W. Wu, 1939
- Siniichthys Bănărescu, 1970
- Squaliobarbus Günther, 1868
- Toxabramis Günther, 1873
- Xenocyprioides Y. Y. Chen, 1982
- Xenocypris Günther, 1868
- Zacco D. S. Jordan & Evermann, 1902

The following fossil genera are known:

- †Dezaoia Su, Chang & Chen, 2021 (Early Oligocene of Inner Mongolia, China)
- †Ecocarpia Chen, Fang & Chang, 2005 (Oligocene of Guangxi, China)
- †Eoctenopharyngodon Su, Chang & Chen, 2021 (Early Oligocene of Hebei, China)
- †Eoxenocypris Chang, Chen & Tong, 1996 (Middle Miocene of Heilongjiang, China)
- †Iquius Jordan, 1919 (Middle Miocene of Japan)
- †Ikiculter Yabumoto, 2010 (Middle Miocene of Japan)

A potential fossil genus of the Xenocyprinae is †Planktophaga Böhme et al., 2014 from the middle-late Eocene of Vietnam. Although initially classified under the East Asian group of Leuciscinae sensu lato (as Hypophthalmichthys was previously classified under it), it has unique pharyngeal teeth only shared with Hypophthalmichthys, and thus may represent a basal member of the group. Fossil teeth of indeterminate xenocyprines were found from the same site.
