= Small-spine tadpole-goby =

Conservation status
- Least Concern (IUCN 3.1)

Scientific classification
- Kingdom: Animalia
- Phylum: Chordata
- Class: Actinopterygii
- Order: Gobiiformes
- Family: Gobiidae
- Genus: Benthophilus
- Species: B. mahmudbejovi

Binomial name
- Benthophilus mahmudbejovi Ragimov, 1976
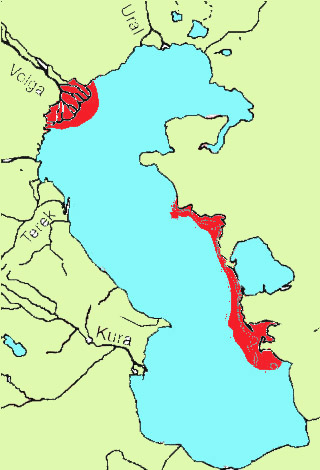
- The range of the Small-spine tadpole-goby

Species of fish

The small-spine tadpole-goby (Benthophilus mahmudbejovi) is a species of goby, a small fish native to the eastern coasts of the Caspian Sea and the lower reaches of the Volga River up to Volgograd. In the sea it is recorded from the Cape Peschany to the Çeleken Peninsula and Ogurja Ada Island in the south. It is abundant the Volga River delta. This species can be found at depths down to 50 metres (160 ft) although the adults generally are not found deeper than 11 metres (36 ft). This species can reach a length of 6.6 centimetres (2.6 in) TL. The specific name honours the Azerbaijani ichthyologist A. A. Mahmudbekov, studied the fish of the Caspian Sea for much of his life.
