= Sand goby (disambiguation) =

Sand goby may refer to several species of fishes of Gobioidei:

- Pomatoschistus minutus, a species related to true gobies (Gobiidae: Gobiinae)
- Favonigobius, a genus related to true gobies (Gobiidae: Gobiinae).
- Kraemeriidae, a family of Gobioidei, also called sand sleepers.
- Neogobius pallasi, the Caspian sand goby, or White goby a species of Benthophilinae.
- Oxyeleotris marmorata often eaten in South-East Asia
