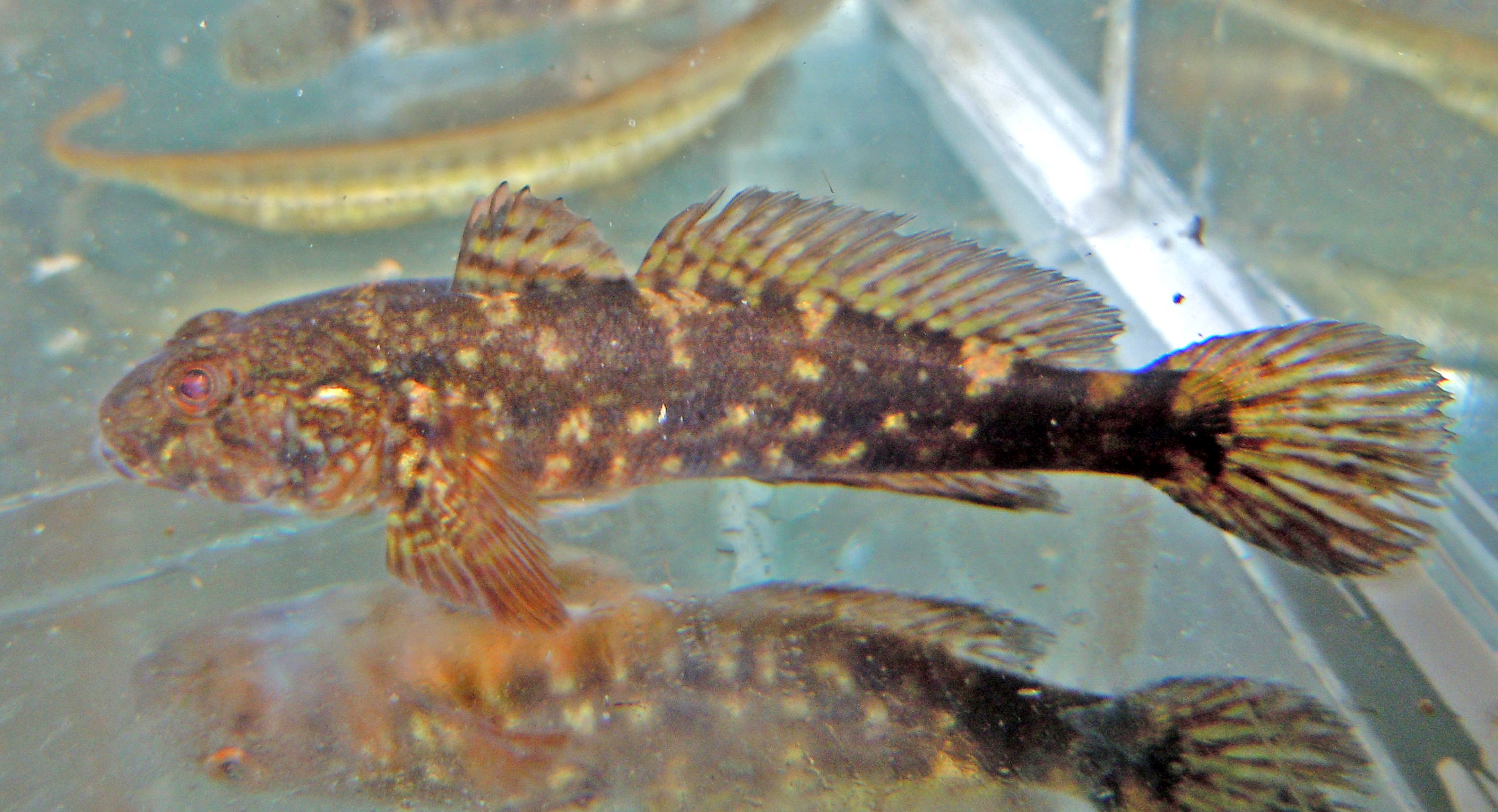
- From the Gulf of Odessa

Conservation status
- Data Deficient (IUCN 3.1)

Scientific classification
- Kingdom: Animalia
- Phylum: Chordata
- Class: Actinopterygii
- Division: Teleostei
- Order: Gobiiformes
- Family: Gobiidae
- Genus: Ponticola
- Species: P. cephalargoides

Binomial name
- Ponticola cephalargoides (Vitaly Iustinovich Pinchuk, 1976)

Synonyms
- Neogobius cephalargoides Pinchuk, 1976

= Pinchuk's goby =

Species of fish

Pinchuk's goby (Ponticola cephalargoides) is a species of goby native to the Black Sea and the Sea of Azov.

== Characteristics ==
The body of adults is prolonged, not very high. Only juveniles have high and short body. Сaudal peduncle is very high (highest between al representatives of genus Ponticola), short and flattened from sides (its high is equal its length). The scales on the caudal peduncle are not very big. Head is flattened from sides, snout profile is round, cheeks are round. Superior lip is broad, relatively short. Premaxilla short (especially in juveniles), with sparse strong lips. First dorsal fin is rounded, has a narrow yellow-orange stripe on the edge. This species can reach a length of 25 centimetres (9.8 in) NG.

== Range ==
In the northwestern and northeastern parts of the Black Sea, also in some parts of the Sea of Azov. Habits same habitats with the ratan goby Ponticola ratan. With the flatsnout goby Ponticola platyrostris is separated geographically.
