= Benthophilus pinchuki =

Scientific classification
- Kingdom: Animalia
- Phylum: Chordata
- Class: Actinopterygii
- Order: Gobiiformes
- Family: Gobiidae
- Genus: Benthophilus
- Species: B. pinchuki

Binomial name
- Benthophilus pinchuki Ragimov, 1982
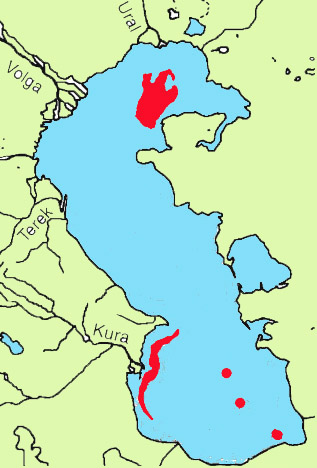
- The range of the Pinchuk's pugolovka

Synonyms
- Benthophilus ctenolepidus pinchuki Ragimov, 1982

Species of fish

Benthophilus pinchuki, Pinchuk's pugolovka, is a species of gobiid fish found along the eastern and western coasts of the Caspian Sea, but absent on the middle part. This species has been recorded along the western coast from the Absheron to Iran, and along the eastern coast near the Cape Bely Bugor (Akdepe, Akpatlawuk), Turkmenistan.

It was described initially as a subspecies of Benthophilus ctenolepidus, but later considered an independent species. The specific name honours the Russian ichthyologist Vitaly Iustinovich Pinchuk (1931–1992) of the USSR Academy of Sciences. In 1979 Pinchuk had collaborated with Ragimov in the description of Benthophilus svetovidovi.
