= Benthophilus svetovidovi =

Scientific classification
- Domain: Eukaryota
- Kingdom: Animalia
- Phylum: Chordata
- Class: Actinopterygii
- Order: Gobiiformes
- Family: Gobiidae
- Genus: Benthophilus
- Species: B. svetovidovi

Binomial name
- Benthophilus svetovidovi Pinchuk & Ragimov, 1979
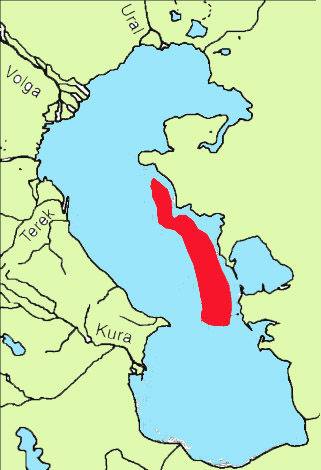
- The range of the species

Species of fish

Benthophilus svetovidovi is a species of goby native to the eastern coasts of the Caspian Sea: near the capes Sagandyk, Melovyi, Peschany, Karasyngyr, off Türkmenbaşy, probably near Ogurja Ada.
