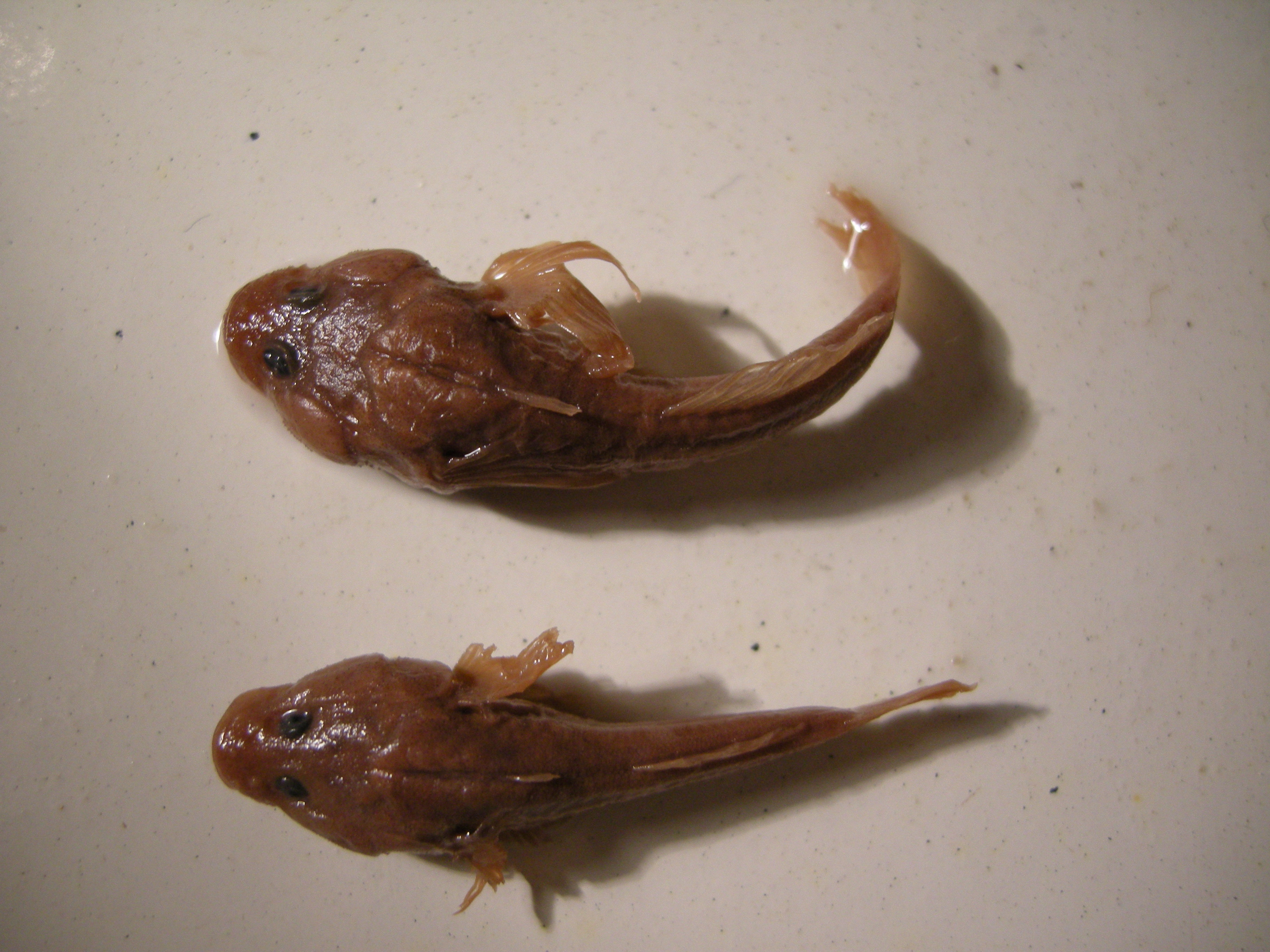

Scientific classification
- Domain: Eukaryota
- Kingdom: Animalia
- Phylum: Chordata
- Class: Actinopterygii
- Order: Gobiiformes
- Family: Gobiidae
- Genus: Benthophilus
- Species: B. ragimovi

Binomial name
- Benthophilus ragimovi Boldyrev & Bogutskaya, 2004
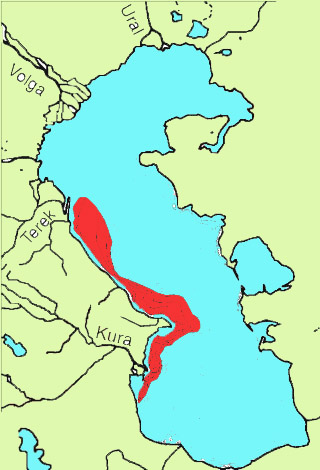
- The range of the species

= Benthophilus ragimovi =

Species of fish

Benthophilus ragimovi is a deepwater species of gobiid fish found along the western coasts of the Caspian Sea, from the Chechen Island to Astara, Azerbaijan. It is one of the numerous species of benthophiline gobies endemic to the Ponto-Caspian region (Caspian and Black Sea basins).
