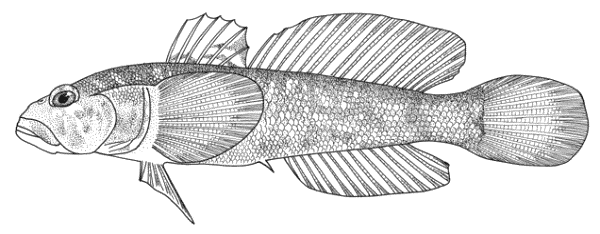

Conservation status
- Least Concern (IUCN 3.1)

Scientific classification
- Domain: Eukaryota
- Kingdom: Animalia
- Phylum: Chordata
- Class: Actinopterygii
- Order: Gobiiformes
- Family: Gobiidae
- Genus: Ponticola
- Species: P. cyrius

Binomial name
- Ponticola cyrius (Kessler, 1874)

Synonyms
- Gobius cyrius Kessler, 1874; Neogobius cyrius (Kessler, 1874); Gobius weidemanni Kessler, 1874

= Ponticola cyrius =

Species of fish

Ponticola cyrius, the Kura goby, is a species of gobiid fish endemic to the Kura River in the southern Caucasus countries of Georgia, Turkey, Iran and Azerbaijan. It reaches a length of 13 centimetres (5.1 in) SL. It lives in the upper parts of the Kura River, Massuleh River and the Pasikhan River and in the Anzali Mordab (Iran). Downstream in Kura it is replaced by Ponticola gorlap.
