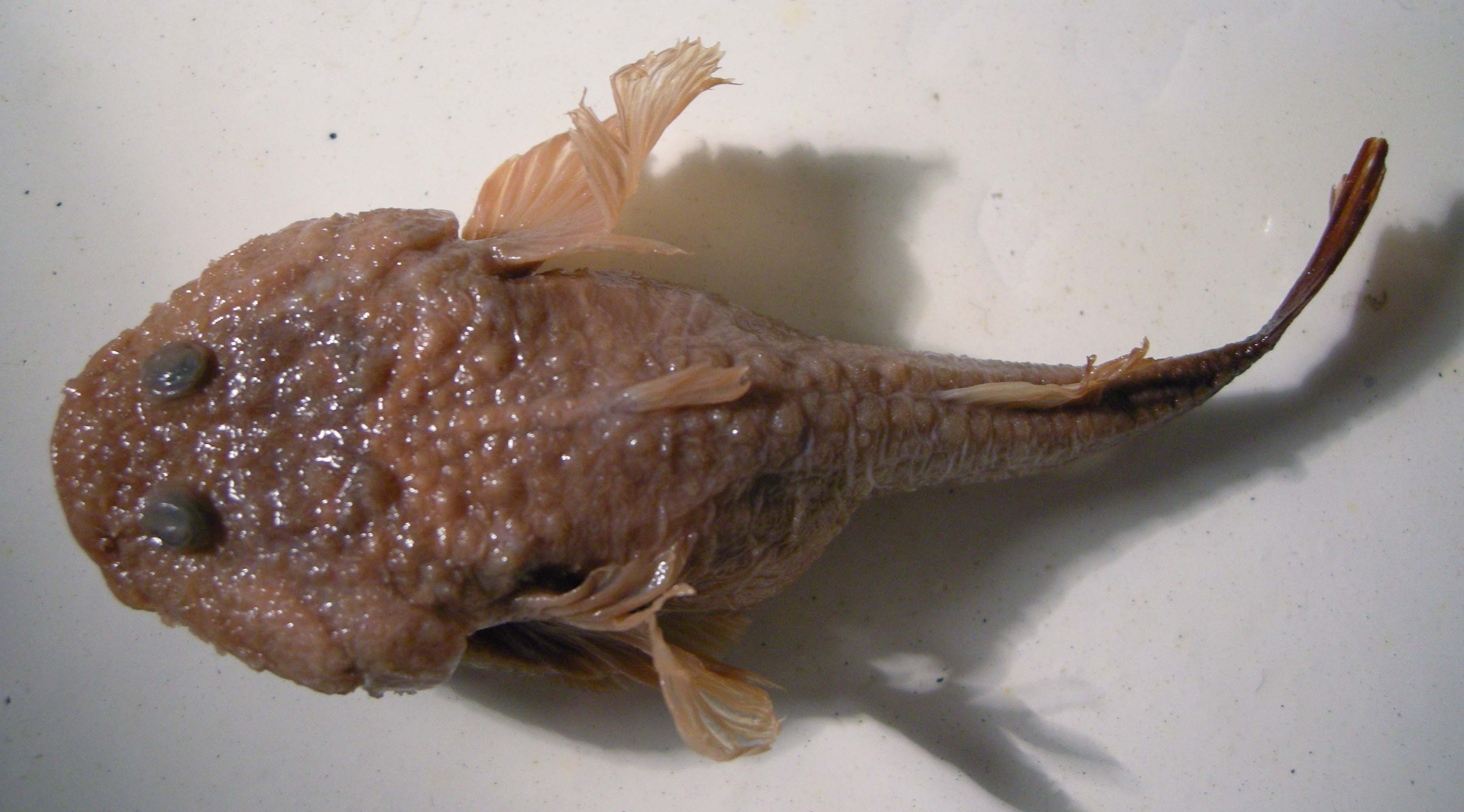

Scientific classification
- Domain: Eukaryota
- Kingdom: Animalia
- Phylum: Chordata
- Class: Actinopterygii
- Order: Gobiiformes
- Family: Gobiidae
- Genus: Benthophilus
- Species: B. casachicus

Binomial name
- Benthophilus casachicus Ragimov, 1978
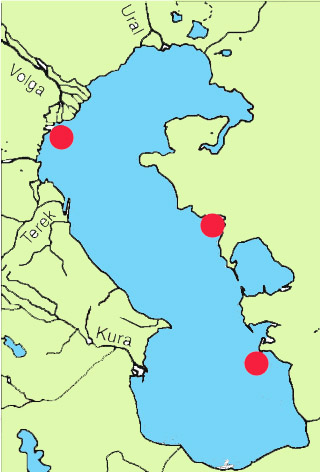
- Places of findings of Benthophilus casachicus

Synonyms
- Benthophilus stellatus casachicus Ragimov, 1978

= Benthophilus casachicus =

Species of fish

Benthophilus casachicus is a species of goby widespread along the eastern coasts of the Caspian Sea from the Cape Pischanyi to Ogurja Ada at south, also near Astrakhan. This species prefers estuaries and coastal waters. This species can reach a length of 7.6 centimetres (3.0 in) TL.
