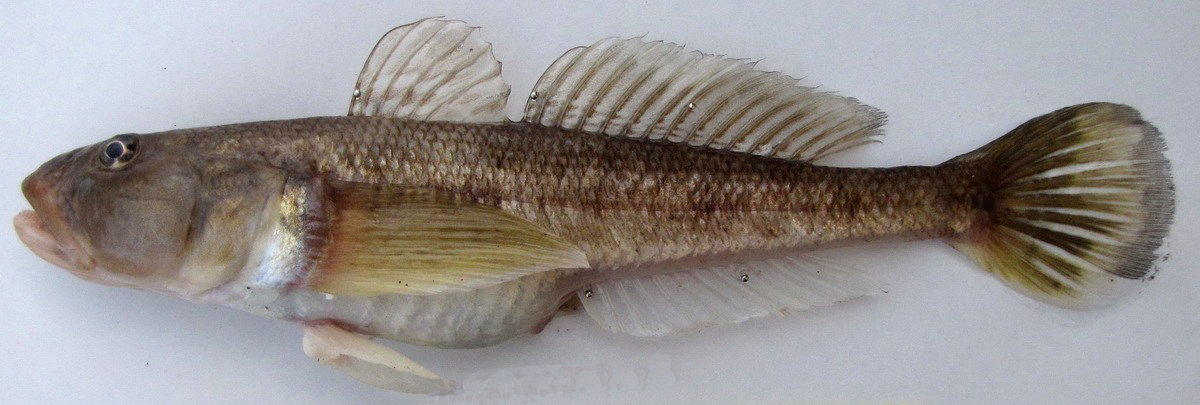
- Neogobius bathybius from the Bandar-e Anzali Shore, Caspian Sea, Iran

Scientific classification
- Kingdom: Animalia
- Phylum: Chordata
- Class: Actinopterygii
- Order: Gobiiformes
- Family: Gobiidae
- Genus: Ponticola
- Species: P. bathybius

Binomial name
- Ponticola bathybius (Kessler, 1877)

Synonyms
- Gobius bathybius Kessler, 1877; Neogobius bathybius (Kessler, 1877); Chasar bathybius (Kessler, 1877)

= Ponticola bathybius =

Species of fish

Neogobius bathybius is a species of goby endemic to the Caspian Sea, where it occurs in depths down to 200 metres (660 ft). It is strictly confined to the brackish-water basin and does not enter fresh waters. It can grow up to a length of 25 centimetres (9.8 in) TL.

The species was transferred to the genus Ponticola from Neogobius on the basis of relationship revealed in molecular investigations. On the other hand, recent molecular studies have proven that this species belongs entirely to the genus Neogobius.
