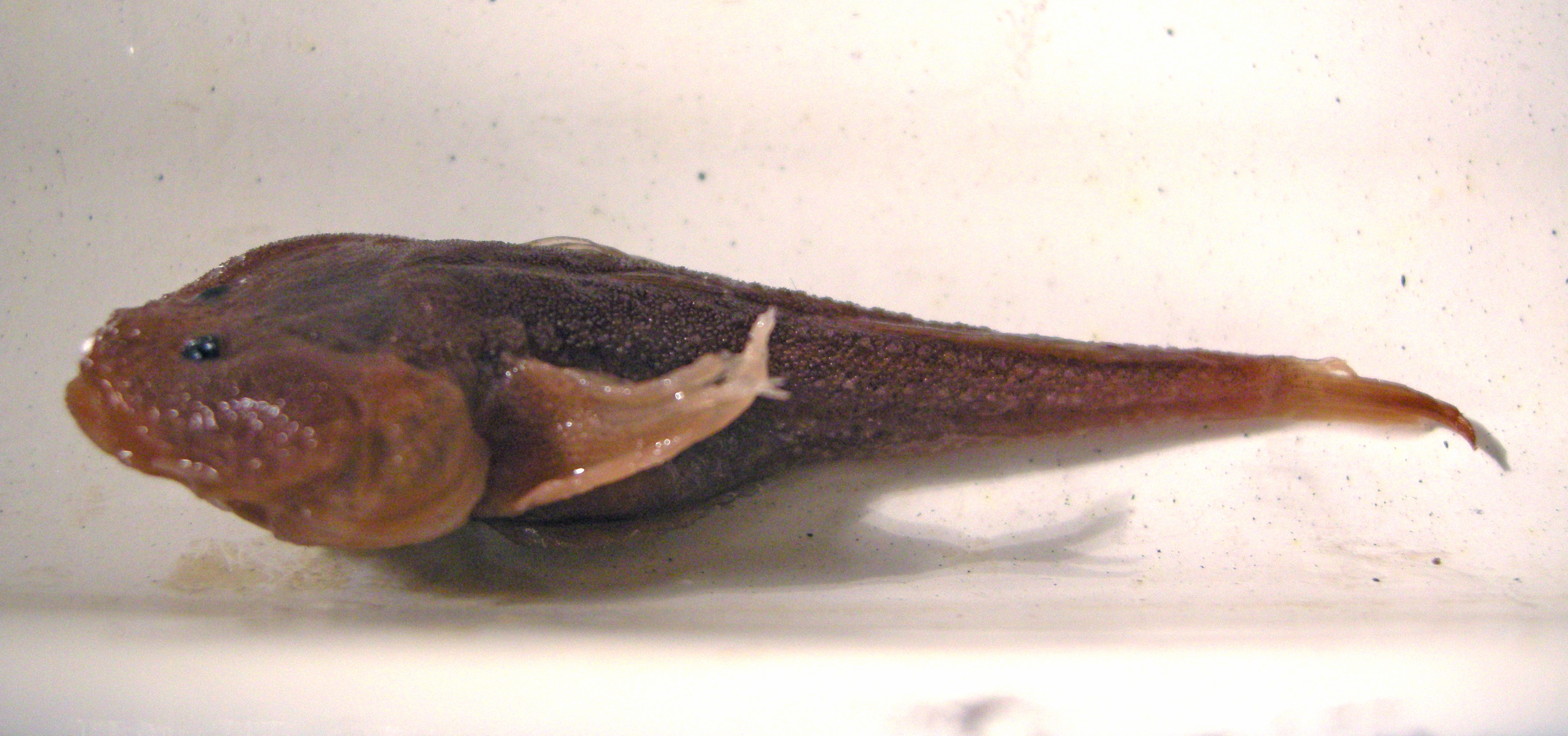

Scientific classification
- Kingdom: Animalia
- Phylum: Chordata
- Class: Actinopterygii
- Division: Teleostei
- Order: Gobiiformes
- Family: Gobiidae
- Genus: Benthophilus
- Species: B. abdurahmanovi

Binomial name
- Benthophilus abdurahmanovi Ragimov, 1978
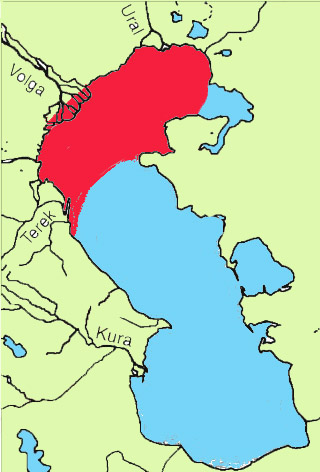
- the range of the Abdurahmanov's pugolovka

Synonyms
- Benthophilus magistri abdurahmanovi Ragimov, 1978

= Abdurahmanov's pugolovka =

Species of fish

Abdurahmanov's pugolovka (Benthophilus abdurahmanovi) is a brackishwater fish of family Gobiidae. It is found in the northern Caspian Sea and the lower reaches of the rivers Volga and Terek. FishBase treats this taxa as a subspecies of the Azov tadpole goby, and is reported as Benthophilus magistri abdurahmanovi.

The specific name honours Azerbaijani zoologist Yusif Abdurahmanov.
