= Stellate tadpole-goby =

Conservation status
- Least Concern (IUCN 3.1)

Scientific classification
- Kingdom: Animalia
- Phylum: Chordata
- Class: Actinopterygii
- Division: Teleostei
- Order: Gobiiformes
- Family: Gobiidae
- Genus: Benthophilus
- Species: B. stellatus

Binomial name
- Benthophilus stellatus (Sauvage, 1874)
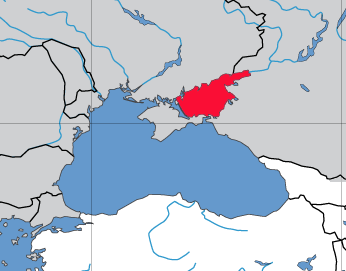
- The range of the stellate tadpole-goby

Synonyms
- Doliichthys stellatus Sauvage, 1874; Benthophilus macrocephalus maeoticus Kuznetsov, 1888; Benthophilus monstrosus Kuznetsov, 1888

Species of fish

The stellate tadpole-goby (Benthophilus stellatus) is a species of gobiid fish native to the basin of the Sea of Azov where it occurs in the Gulf of Taganrog and limans of the eastern coast. It also lives in the lower Don River up to the Tsimlyansk Reservoir. It occurs in fresh and brackish waters of depths greater than 3 metres (9.8 ft), preferring shallow coastal lagoons and lowland rivers. Males can reach a length of 13.5 centimetres (5.3 in) TL while females only reach 11 centimetres (4.3 in) TL. Now the stellate tadpole-goby regularly found in the reservoirs of the Lower and Middle Volga, the lower reaches of the Kama River, the undammed section of the Volga, and its delta.

The Caspian stellate tadpole-goby (Benthophilus leobergius) has been considered a subspecies of this species.

== See also ==
- Benthophilus magistri, the Azov tadpole goby
