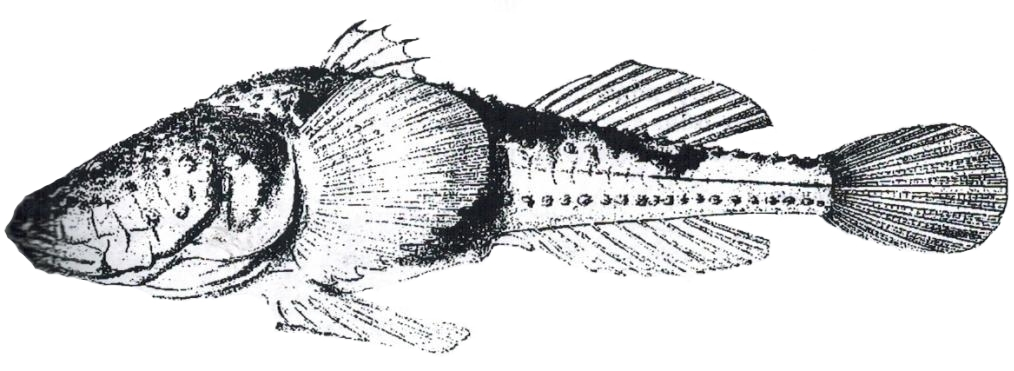

Conservation status
- Least Concern (IUCN 3.1)

Scientific classification
- Kingdom: Animalia
- Phylum: Chordata
- Class: Actinopterygii
- Order: Gobiiformes
- Family: Gobiidae
- Genus: Benthophilus
- Species: B. leobergius

Binomial name
- Benthophilus leobergius L. S. Berg, 1949
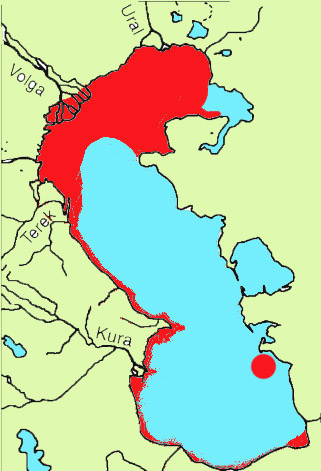
- The range of the Caspian stellate tadpole-goby

Synonyms
- Benthophilus stellatus leobergius L. S. Berg, 1949

= Caspian stellate tadpole-goby =

Species of fish

The Caspian stellate tadpole-goby (Benthophilus leobergius), also known as the starry goby, is a species of gobiid fish endemic to the Caspian Sea basin. It is widespread along all coasts of the Caspian Sea with exception of the central-eastern, and in the lowest part of the Volga River. In the southern part of the basin, it is mentioned near the Ogurja Ada, in the Gorgansky Bay, and in the Sefīd-Rūd River. This species can reach a length of 10 centimetres (3.9 in) SL.

The fish was named by Boris Ilyin after the ichthyologist and geographer Leo S. Berg, and properly taxonomically described by Berg himself the same year, then as a subspecies of Benthophilus stellatus (i.e. B. stellatus leobergius). The specific name is a latinisation of Berg's name.
