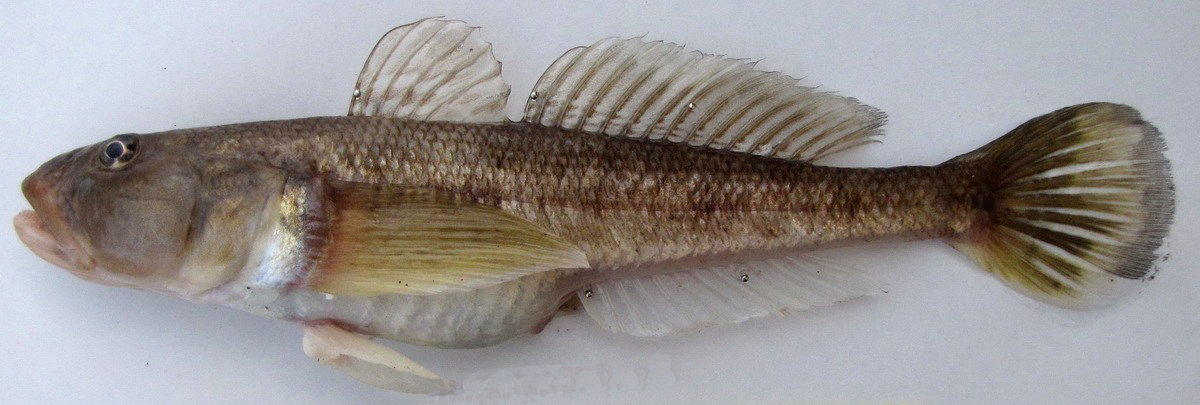
- Ponticola bathybius

Scientific classification
- Kingdom: Animalia
- Phylum: Chordata
- Class: Actinopterygii
- Division: Teleostei
- Order: Gobiiformes
- Family: Gobiidae
- Genus: Ponticola; Iljin, 1927

Type species
- Gobius ratan Nordmann, 1840

= Ponticola =

Genus of fishes

Ponticola is a genus of gobies native mostly to fresh waters of the Black Sea - Caspian Sea region in Eurasia. Some species occur in the brackish-water Black and Caspian seas themselves. It was considered to be part of the broader goby subfamily Benthophilinae, also endemic to the same region, although the 5th edition of Fishes of the World does not list any subfamilies in the Gobiidae. Originally, Ponticola was described as subgenus of Neogobius.

== Species ==
There are currently 16 recognized species in this genus:

- Ponticola bathybius (Kessler, 1877)
- Ponticola cephalargoides (Pinchuk, 1976)
- Ponticola constructor (Nordmann, 1840) (Caucasian goby)
- Ponticola cyrius (Kessler, 1874)
- Ponticola eurycephalus (Kessler, 1874) (Mushroom goby)
- Ponticola gorlap (Iljin, 1949) (Caspian bighead goby)
- Ponticola gymnotrachelus (Kessler, 1857)
- Ponticola iljini (Vasil'eva & Vasil'ev, 1996) (Eastern Caspian bighead goby)
- Ponticola iranicus Vasil'eva, Mousavi-Sabet & Vasil'ev, 2015
- Ponticola kessleri (Günther, 1861) (Big-head goby)
- Ponticola platyrostris (Pallas, 1814) (Flat-snout goby)
- Ponticola ratan (Nordmann, 1840) (Ratan goby)
- Ponticola rhodioni (Vasil'eva & Vasil'ev, 1994) (Riverine goby)
- Ponticola rizensis (Kovačić & Engin, 2008)
- Ponticola syrman (Nordmann, 1840) (Syrman goby)
- Ponticola turani (Kovačić & Engin, 2008) (Turan's goby)
