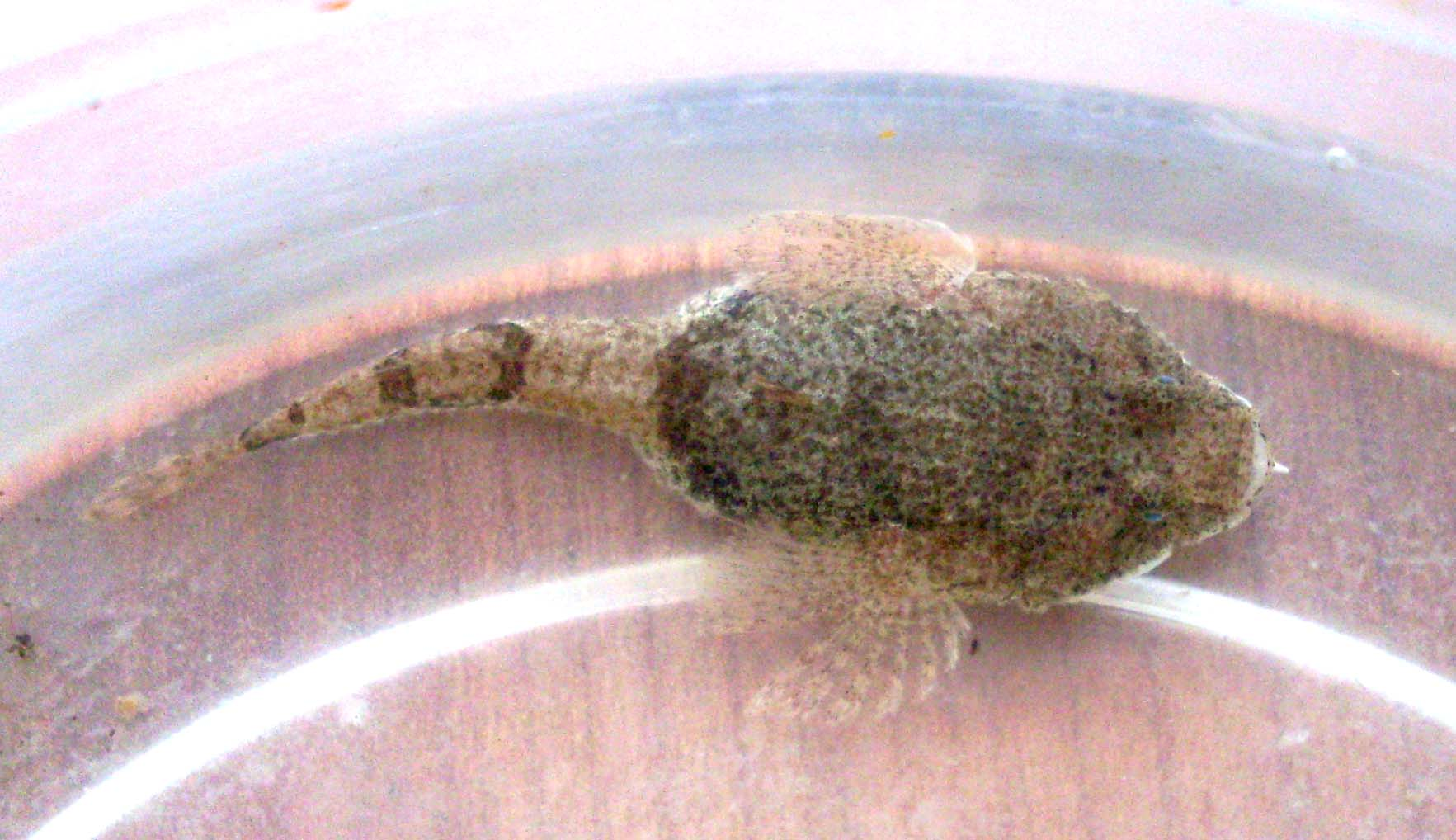

Conservation status
- Least Concern (IUCN 3.1)

Scientific classification
- Domain: Eukaryota
- Kingdom: Animalia
- Phylum: Chordata
- Class: Actinopterygii
- Order: Gobiiformes
- Family: Gobiidae
- Genus: Benthophilus
- Species: B. nudus

Binomial name
- Benthophilus nudus Berg, 1898
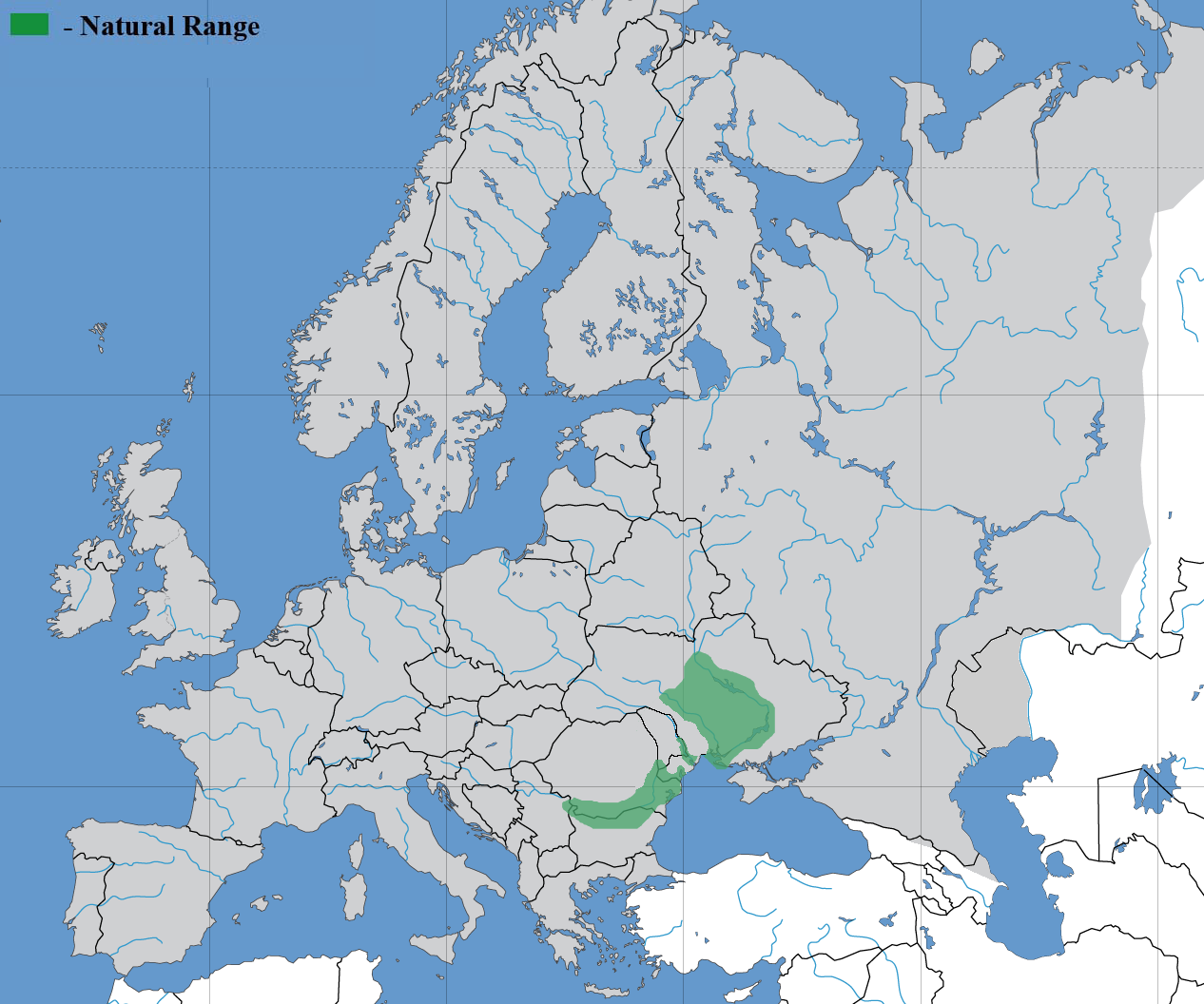
- The range of the Black Sea tadpole-goby

Synonyms
- Benthophilus macrocephalus nudus L. S. Berg, 1898; Benthophilus macrocephalus ponticus L. S. Berg, 1916

= Black Sea tadpole-goby =

Species of fish

The Black Sea tadpole-goby (Benthophilus nudus) is a species of goby native to the basin of the Black Sea. Found in the Gulf of Tendra and limans of the north-western Black Sea, lakes of the Danube Delta. In the rivers of the Black Sea basin: Danube up to Iron Gate dam, Dniester up to Tighina, Dnieper up to Kyiv, Southern Bug. This species is mostly a denizen of fresh and slightly brackish bodies of water, preferring rivers and deltas, limans and coastal lakes. This fish can reach a length of 15 centimetres (5.9 in) TL.
