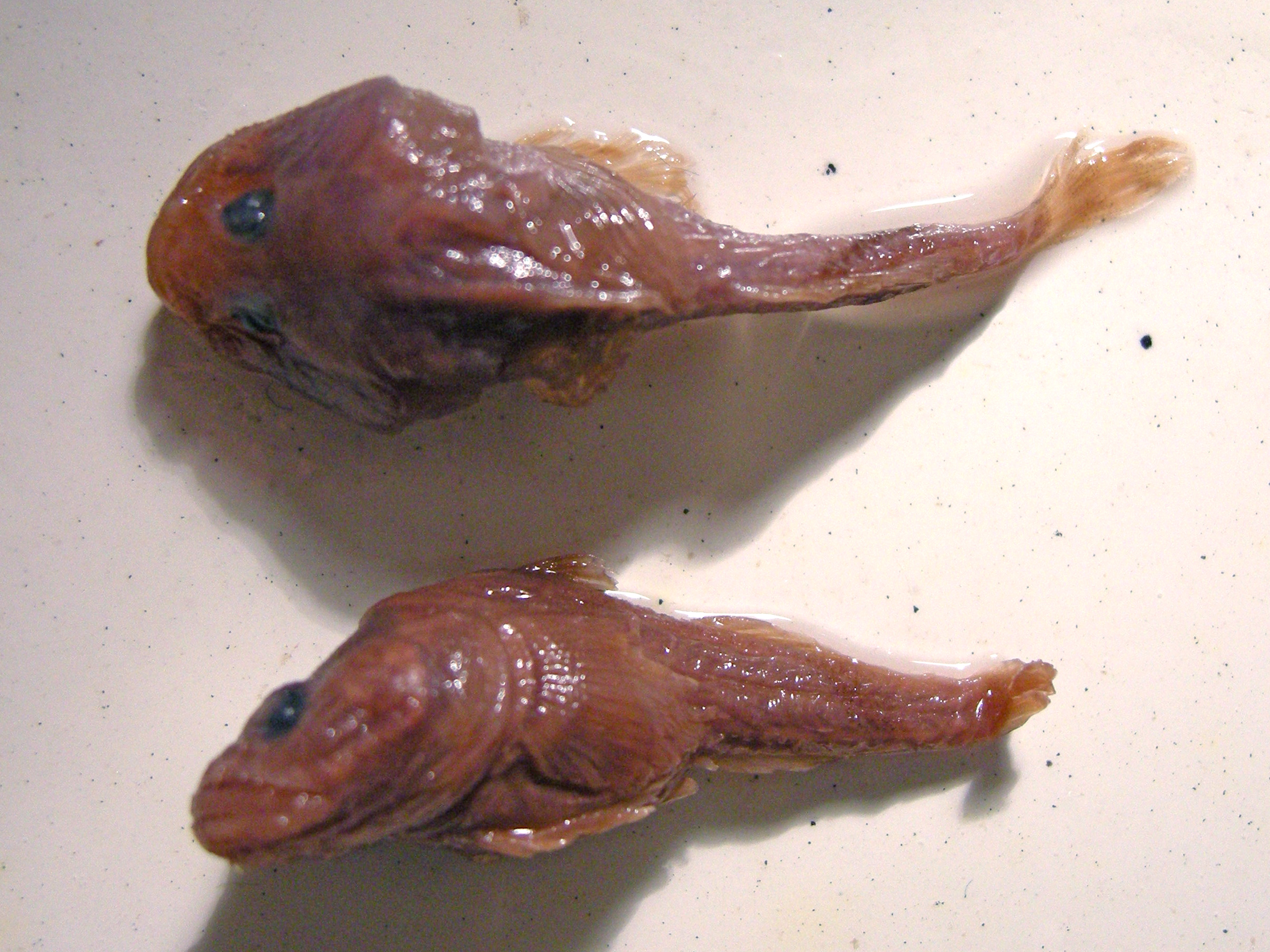

Scientific classification
- Domain: Eukaryota
- Kingdom: Animalia
- Phylum: Chordata
- Class: Actinopterygii
- Order: Gobiiformes
- Family: Gobiidae
- Genus: Benthophilus
- Species: B. kessleri

Binomial name
- Benthophilus kessleri Berg, 1927
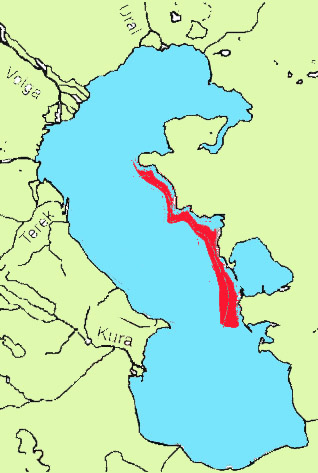
- The range of the species

Synonyms
- Benthophilus grimmi kessleri L. S. Berg, 1927

= Benthophilus kessleri =

Species of fish

Benthophilus kessleri is a species of goby widespread along the eastern coasts of the Caspian Sea from the Urdyuk Cape to Kuuli Cape and Türkmenbaşy at south. This species occurs at depths of from 65 to 75 metres (213 to 246 ft). It can reach a length of 4.6 centimetres (1.8 in) TL. The specific name honours the German-Russian zoologist Karl Fedorovich Kessler (1815-1881).
