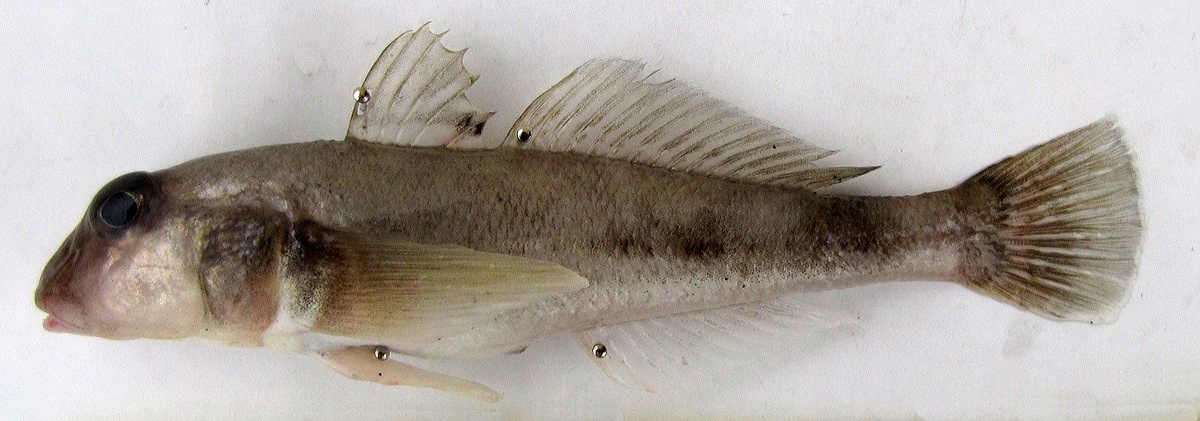
- specimen from the Bandar-e Anzali Shore, Caspian Sea, Iran

Conservation status
- Least Concern (IUCN 3.1)

Scientific classification
- Kingdom: Animalia
- Phylum: Chordata
- Class: Actinopterygii
- Order: Gobiiformes
- Family: Gobiidae
- Genus: Neogobius
- Species: N. caspius

Binomial name
- Neogobius caspius (Eichwald, 1831)

Synonyms
- Gobius caspius Eichwald, 1831

= Caspian goby =

Species of fish

The Caspian goby (Neogobius caspius) is a species of fish endemic to the Caspian Sea where it is only found in brackish waters. It is the largest of the Caspian gobies, and at maximum may reach a length of 34.5 centimetres (13.6 in).
