= Ponticola rizensis =

Conservation status
- Endangered (IUCN 3.1)

Scientific classification
- Domain: Eukaryota
- Kingdom: Animalia
- Phylum: Chordata
- Class: Actinopterygii
- Order: Gobiiformes
- Family: Gobiidae
- Genus: Ponticola
- Species: P. rizensis

Binomial name
- Ponticola rizensis (Kovačić & Engin, 2008)

Synonyms
- Neogobius rizensis Kovačić & Engín, 2008

Species of fish

Ponticola rizensis is a species of gobiid fish endemic to Turkey where it is known only from the İyidere stream drainage, close to the cities of Rize (from which the specific name is derived) and Trabzon. The species was described as new to science in 2008. It occurs in a fresh water stream with a bottom consisting of rounded pebbles. Males of this species can reach a length of 12.4 centimetres (4.9 in) SL while females only reach 8.7 centimetres (3.4 in) SL.
