= Turan's goby =

Conservation status
- Vulnerable (IUCN 3.1)

Scientific classification
- Domain: Eukaryota
- Kingdom: Animalia
- Phylum: Chordata
- Class: Actinopterygii
- Order: Gobiiformes
- Family: Gobiidae
- Genus: Ponticola
- Species: P. turani

Binomial name
- Ponticola turani (Kovačić & Engin, 2008)

Synonyms
- Neogobius turani Kovačić & Engín, 2008

Species of fish

Turan's goby (Ponticola turani) is a Ponto-Caspian species of goby endemic fish native to Turkey where it is only found in the Aksu Deresi stream. This species is found in a fresh water stream with a substrate of rounded pebbles. Males of this species can reach a length of 8.8 centimetres (3.5 in) SL while females only reach 8.3 centimetres (3.3 in) SL.

The fish is named after Turkish biologist, Dr. Davut Turan.
