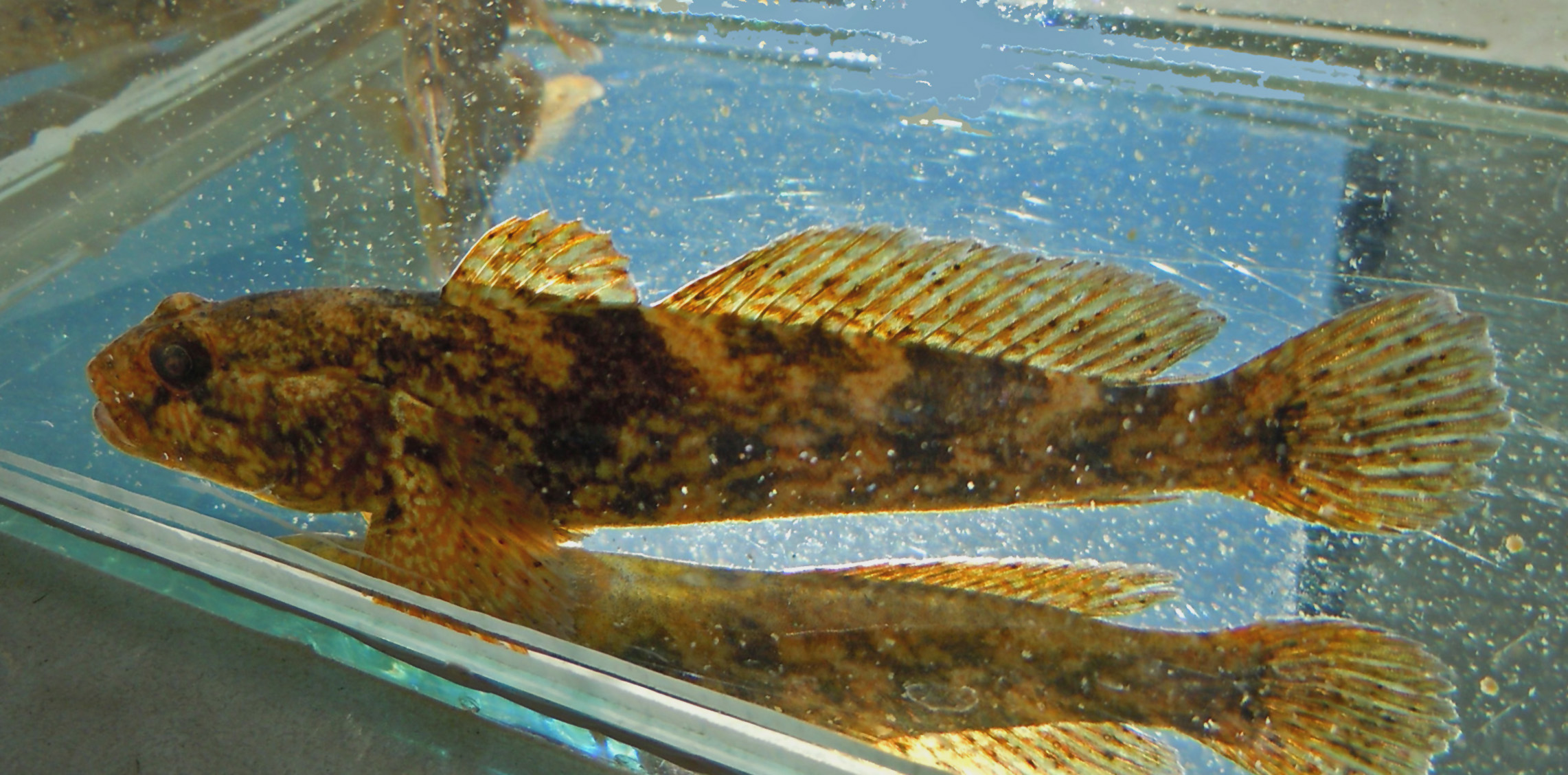
- Mushroom goby from the Sukhyi Estuary, Black Sea, SW Ukraine

Conservation status
- Least Concern (IUCN 3.1)

Scientific classification
- Kingdom: Animalia
- Phylum: Chordata
- Class: Actinopterygii
- Division: Teleostei
- Order: Gobiiformes
- Family: Gobiidae
- Genus: Ponticola
- Species: P. eurycephalus

Binomial name
- Ponticola eurycephalus (Kessler, 1874)

Synonyms
- Gobius eurycephalus Kessler, 1874; Neogobius eurycephalus (Kessler, 1874); Neogobius platyrostris odessicus Pinchuk, 1977; Neogobius eurycephalus odessicus Pinchuk, 1977

= Mushroom goby =

Species of fish

The mushroom goby (Ponticola eurycephalus) is a species of marine ray-finned fish belonging to the family Gobiidae, the "true gobies". This species is endemic to the northern Black Sea.

== Taxonomy ==
The mushroom goby was first formally described as Gobius eurycephalus in 1874 by the Baltic German zoologist Karl Kessler with its type locality given as Enikale near Kerch in the Crimea, Ukraine. This species is now classified in the genus Ponticola which was proposed by Alexander von Nordmann in 1840 and which is classified in the family Gobiidae.

== Etymology ==
The mushroom goby is a member of the genus Ponticola, a name which suffixes -cola, which means "dweller in", onto Pontos, the Greek name for the southern Black Sea. This is a reference to the Black Sea distribution of these gobies. The specific name combines eury, which means "broad", with cephalus, meaning "head", referring to the head of this species being broader than its depth.

== Distribution and habitat ==
The mushroom goby is endemic to the northern Black Sea where it occurs along the coastlines of the Crimean Peninsula and the Sea of Azov. It is a marine species that is not known to enter freshwaters. This species is found in inshore habitats such as brackish lagoons, estuaries and the lower reaches of large rivers. It is typically found in areas where there are rocky substrates or sunken trees.

== Biology ==
The mushroom goby feeds mostly on crustaceans. They attain sexual maturity at 2 years old and the spawning season is between December and April. Each female may spawn several times in a season. This species has a maximum total length of 20 cm (7.9 in).
