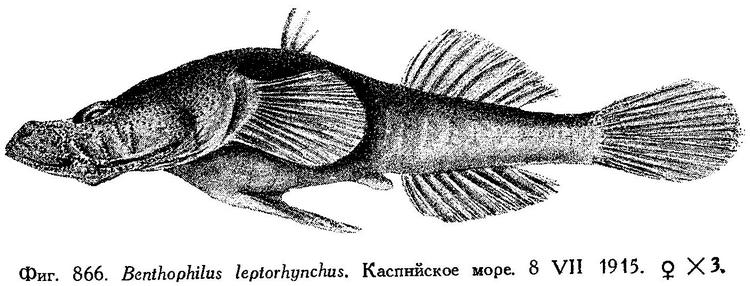

Scientific classification
- Kingdom: Animalia
- Phylum: Chordata
- Class: Actinopterygii
- Order: Gobiiformes
- Family: Gobiidae
- Genus: Benthophilus
- Species: B. leptorhynchus

Binomial name
- Benthophilus leptorhynchus Kessler, 1877
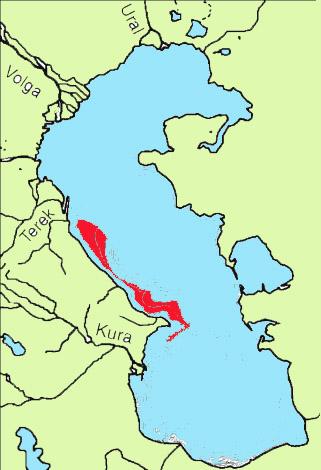
- the range of the short-snout pugolovka

= Short-snout pugolovka =

Species of fish

The short-snout pugolovka (Benthophilus leptorhynchus) is a deepwater species of goby widespread in the central part of the Caspian Sea at the depth of 40 to 150 metres (130 to 490 ft), with salinity 10–13.5‰. It is found along the western coast of the Caspian Sea from the mouth of the Sulak River to Baku at south. This species can reach a length of 4 centimetres (1.6 in) TL.
