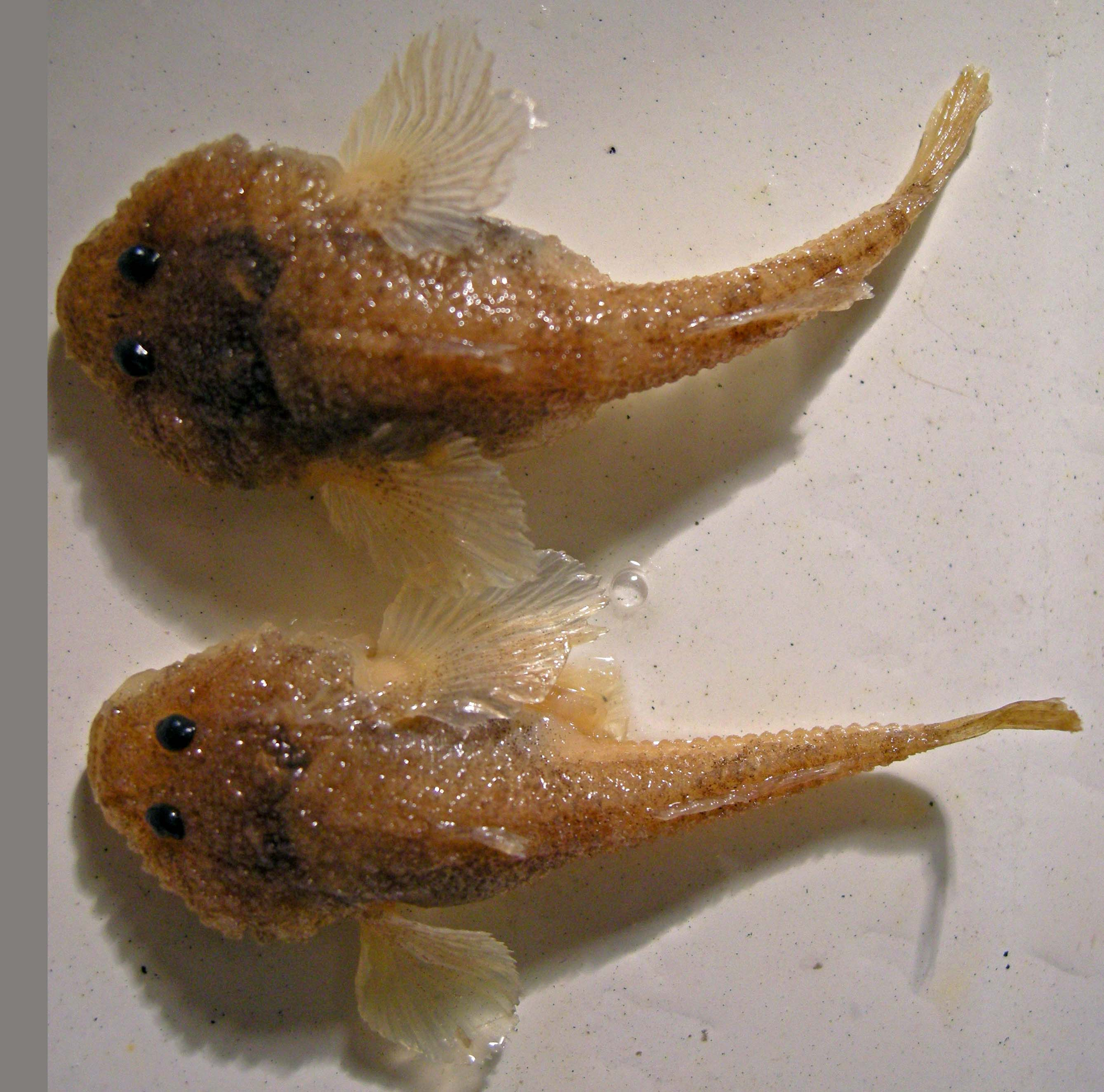

Conservation status
- Least Concern (IUCN 3.1)

Scientific classification
- Domain: Eukaryota
- Kingdom: Animalia
- Phylum: Chordata
- Class: Actinopterygii
- Order: Gobiiformes
- Family: Gobiidae
- Genus: Benthophilus
- Species: B. durrelli

Binomial name
- Benthophilus durrelli Boldyrev & Bogutskaya, 2004
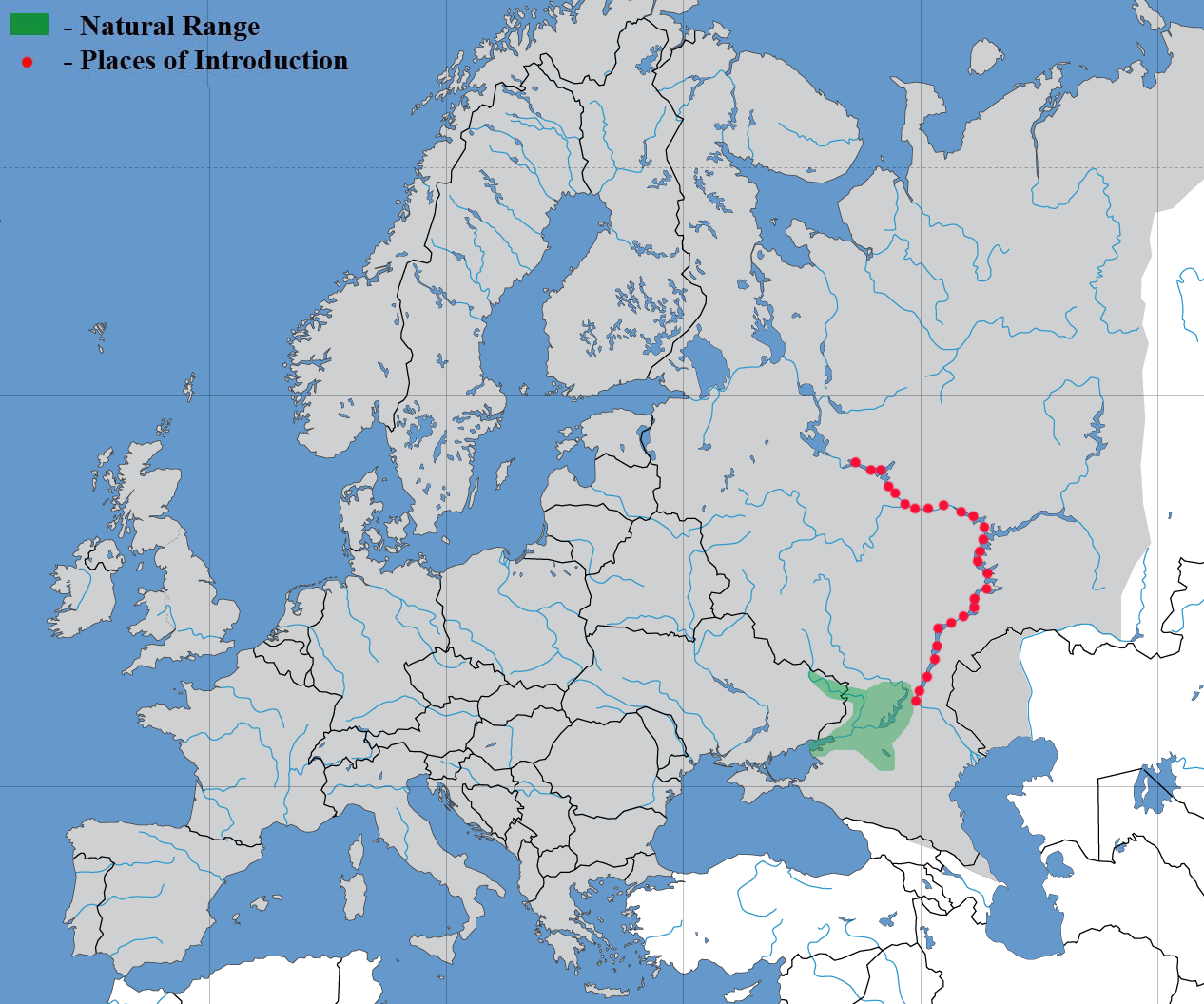
- The range of the Don tadpole-goby

= Don tadpole-goby =

Species of fish

The Don tadpole-goby (Benthophilus durrelli) is a species of goby widespread in the basin of the Sea of Azov, specifically in the lower Don River and Tsimlyansk Reservoir. This species is found in rivers, reservoirs and river mouths, but is not known to enter seas. It is introduced and invasive upstream the Volga River, e.g. the Kuibyshev Reservoir. This fish can reach a length of 6.6 centimetres (2.6 in) SL. Life span is about one year.

== Etymology ==
This species was named after the English author and naturalist Gerald Durrell (1925–1995).
