= Caucasian goby =

Conservation status
- Least Concern (IUCN 3.1)

Scientific classification
- Domain: Eukaryota
- Kingdom: Animalia
- Phylum: Chordata
- Class: Actinopterygii
- Order: Gobiiformes
- Family: Gobiidae
- Genus: Ponticola
- Species: P. constructor

Binomial name
- Ponticola constructor (Nordmann, 1840)

Synonyms
- Gobius constructor Nordmann, 1840; Gobius cephalarges constructor Nordmann, 1840; Neogobius cephalarges constructor (Nordmann, 1840); Neogobius constructor (Nordmann, 1840)

Species of fish

The Caucasian goby (Ponticola constructor) is a species of goby native to rivers of the Caucasus draining to the Black Sea in Europe and Asia. This species is strictly a fresh water species and will not enter brackish water. It can reach a length of 20 centimetres (7.9 in) SL.
