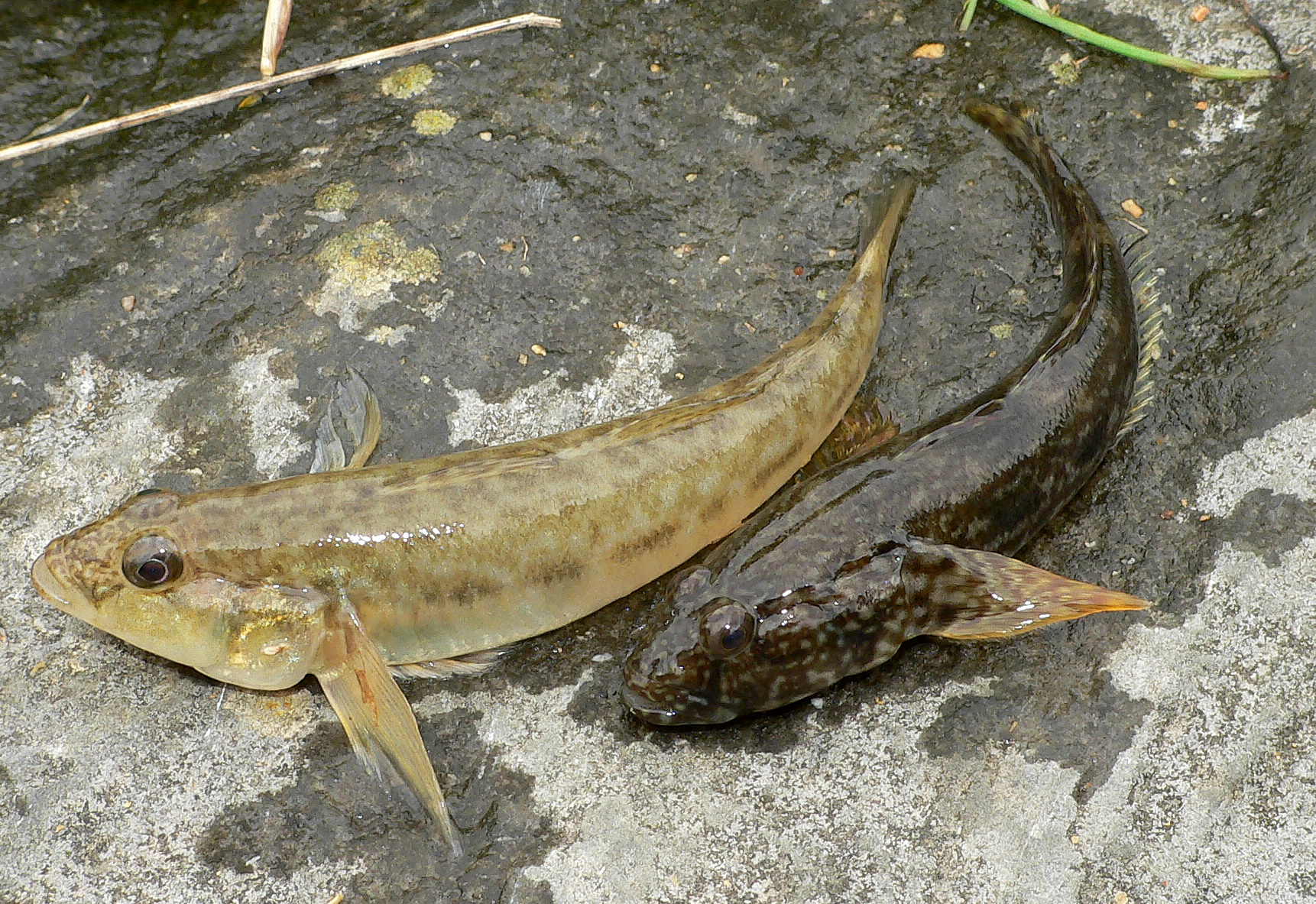
- The pale monkey goby (Neogobius fluviatilis) and the dark bighead goby (Ponticola kessleri) are representatives of Benthophilinae

Scientific classification
- Kingdom: Animalia
- Phylum: Chordata
- Class: Actinopterygii
- Order: Gobiiformes
- Family: Gobiidae
- Subfamily: Benthophilinae; Beling & Iljin, 1927

Type genus
- Benthophilus Eichwald, 1831

Genera
- See text

= Benthophilinae =

Subfamily of fishes

The Benthophilinae are a subfamily of gobies endemic to the Ponto-Caspian region (including the Marmara, Black, Azov, Caspian, and Aral Seas). The subfamily includes about 50 species. The representatives of the subfamily have fused pelvic fins and elongated dorsal and anal fins. They are distinguished from the closely related subfamily Gobiinae by the absence of a swimbladder in adults and location of the uppermost rays of the pectoral fins within the fin membrane.

The Catalog of Fishes still considers these fishes as belonging to the subfamily Gobiinae.

== Systematics of the subfamily ==
- Tribe Benthophilini
  - Anatirostrum
  - Benthophiloides
  - Benthophilus (type genus)
  - Caspiosoma
- Tribe Neogobiini
  - Neogobius (type genus)
- Tribe Ponticolini
  - Babka
  - Mesogobius
  - Ponticola (type genus)
  - Proterorhinus
