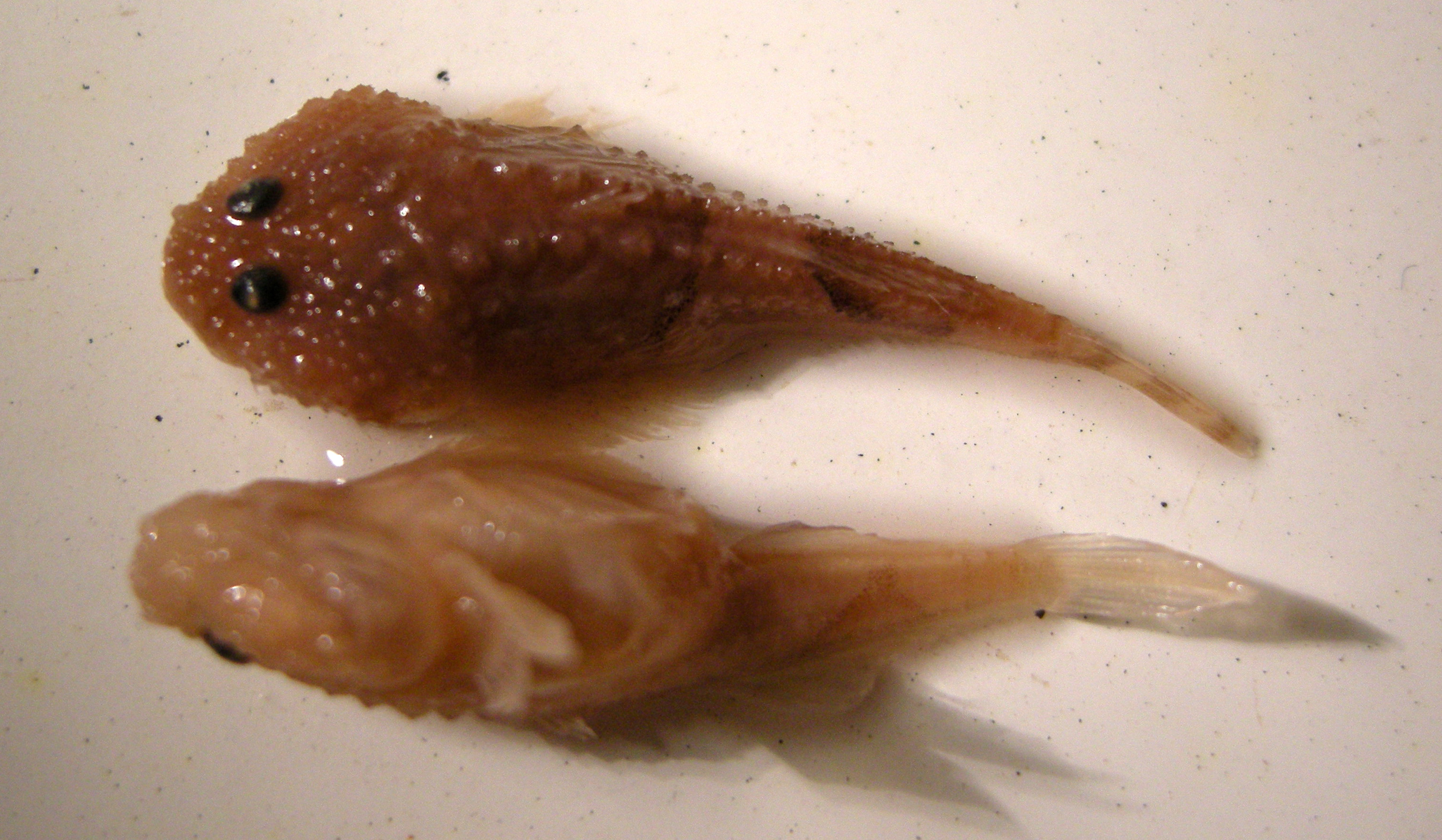

Scientific classification
- Domain: Eukaryota
- Kingdom: Animalia
- Phylum: Chordata
- Class: Actinopterygii
- Order: Gobiiformes
- Family: Gobiidae
- Genus: Benthophilus
- Species: B. spinosus

Binomial name
- Benthophilus spinosus Kessler, 1877
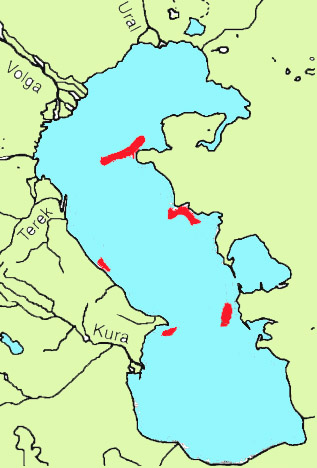
- The range of the spiny pugolovka

= Spiny pugolovka =

Species of fish

The spiny pugolovka (Benthophilus spinosus) is a fish of family Gobiidae. Widespread along the southern and eastern coasts of the Caspian Sea. On the east it is common between the island Kulaly and Mangyshlak Peninsula in south. This species lives in brackish waters at depths down to about 43 metres (141 ft) and strictly avoids fresh waters. It can reach a length of 3.4 centimetres (1.3 in) TL.
