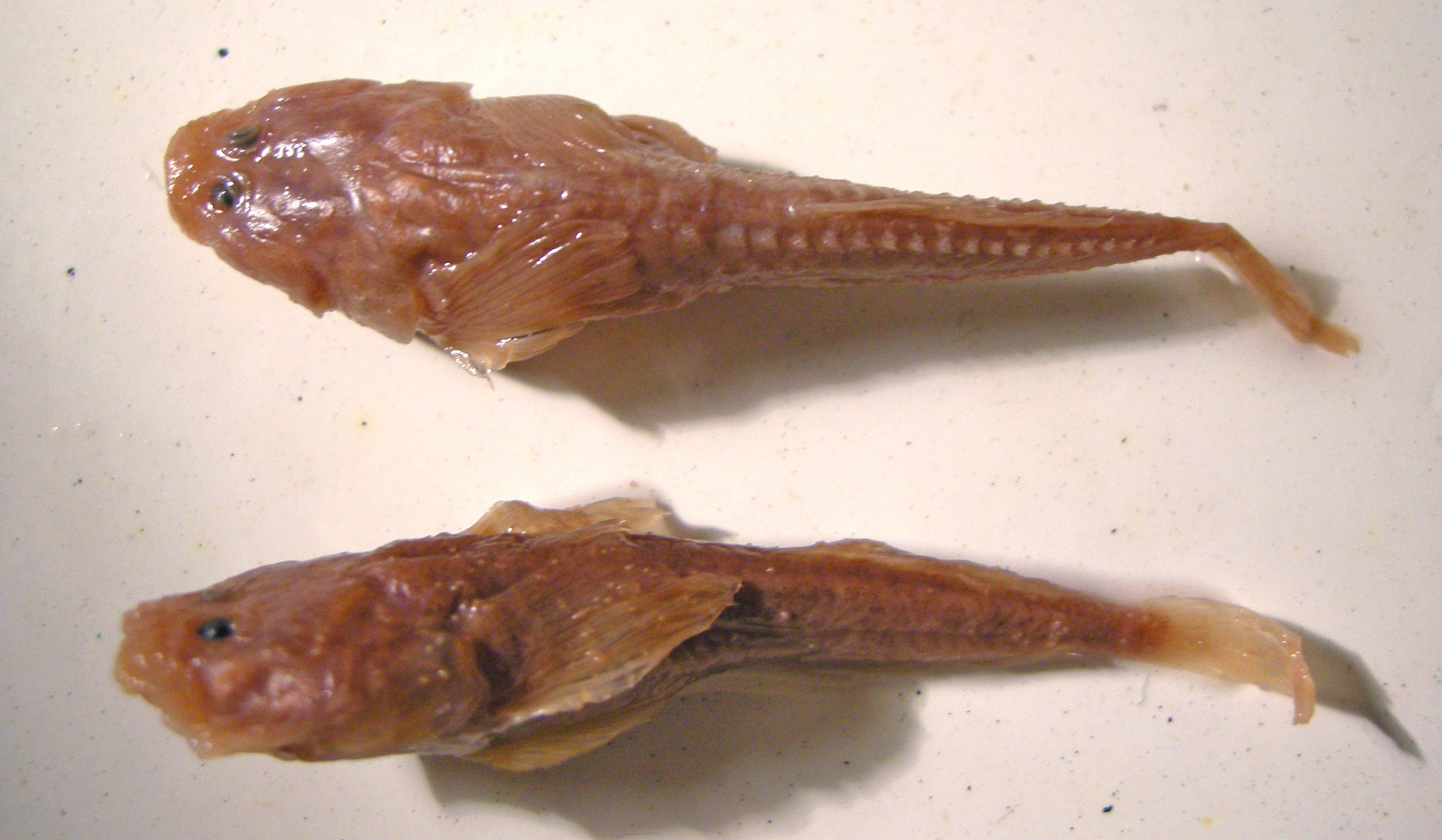

Scientific classification
- Domain: Eukaryota
- Kingdom: Animalia
- Phylum: Chordata
- Class: Actinopterygii
- Order: Gobiiformes
- Family: Gobiidae
- Genus: Benthophilus
- Species: B. leptocephalus

Binomial name
- Benthophilus leptocephalus Kessler, 1877
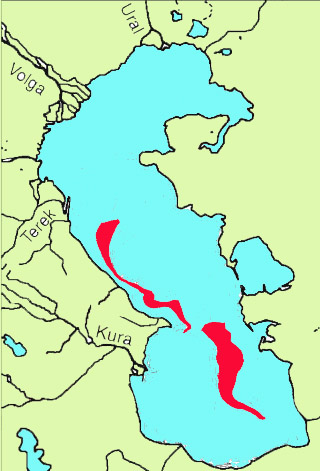
- The range of the species

= Benthophilus leptocephalus =

Species of fish

Benthophilus leptocephalus is a deepwater species of goby widespread along the central Caspian Sea from the mouth of the Samur River to Türkmenbaşy and Hasan-Kuli. This species can reach a length of 5.4 centimetres (2.1 in) TL.
