= Benthophilus grimmi =

Scientific classification
- Domain: Eukaryota
- Kingdom: Animalia
- Phylum: Chordata
- Class: Actinopterygii
- Order: Gobiiformes
- Family: Gobiidae
- Genus: Benthophilus
- Species: B. grimmi

Binomial name
- Benthophilus grimmi Kessler, 1877
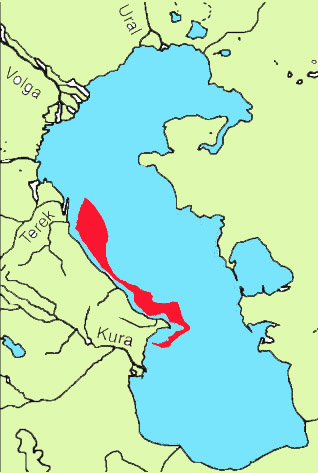
- The range of the species

Synonyms
- Benthophilus grimmi grimmi Kessler, 1877

Species of fish

Benthophilus grimmi is a species of goby widespread in the northern Caspian Sea at depth 80 to 240 metres (260 to 790 ft). This species is common from Chechen Island to Absheron Peninsula. This species can reach a length of 9.5 centimetres (3.7 in) TL. The specific name honours the Russian ichthyologist Oscar von Grimm (1845–1921), who was Chief Inspector of Russian Fisheries in the Russian Empire who collected the type specimen.
