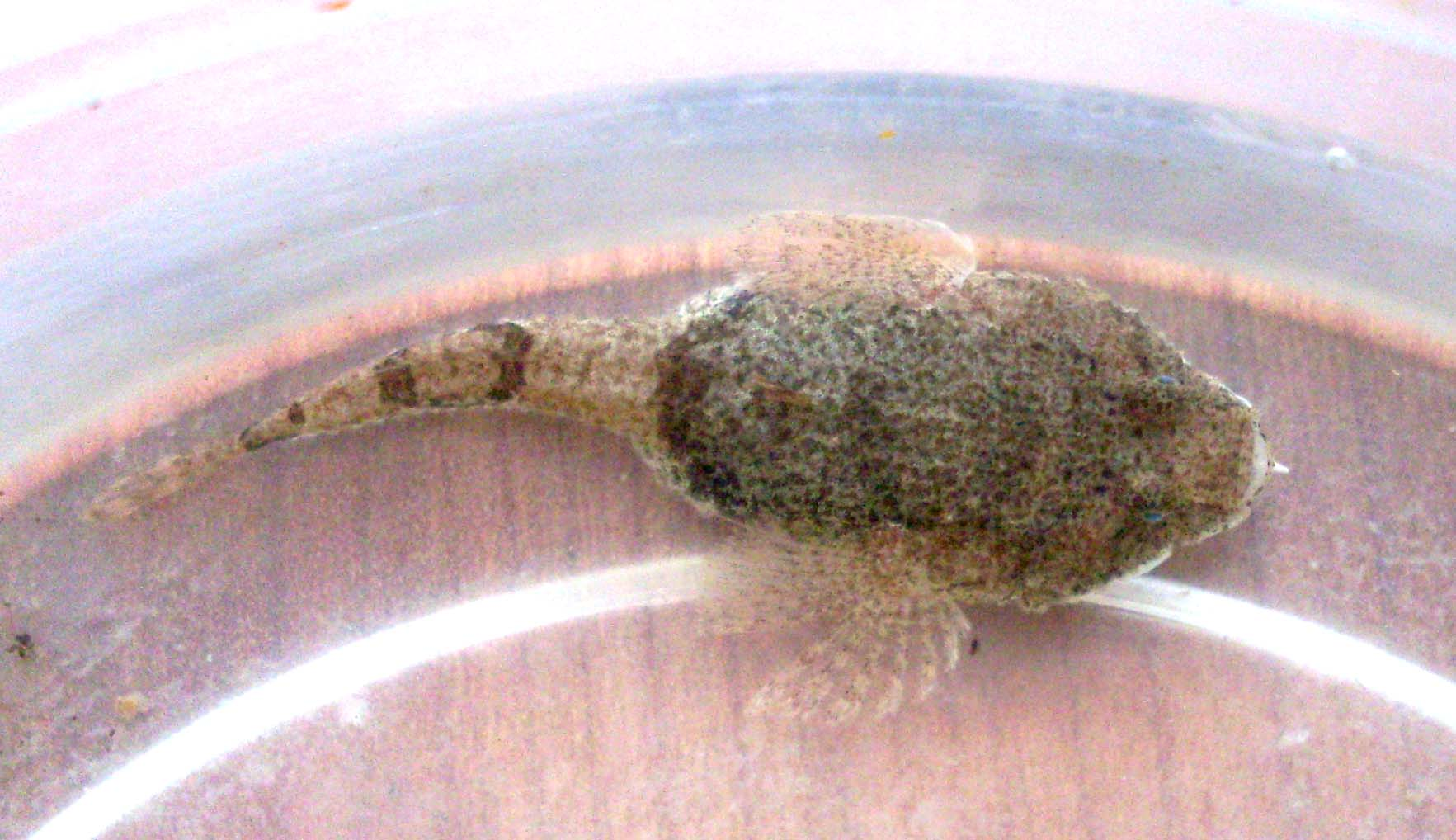
- Black Sea tadpole-goby (Benthophilus nudus)

Scientific classification
- Kingdom: Animalia
- Phylum: Chordata
- Class: Actinopterygii
- Division: Teleostei
- Order: Gobiiformes
- Family: Gobiidae
- Subfamily: Gobiinae
- Genus: Benthophilus; Eichwald, 1831

Type species
- Gobius macrocephalus Pallas, 1788

Synonyms
- Aspidophilus Koumans, 1931; Doliichthys Sauvage, 1874; Hexacanthus von Nordmann, 1838

= Tadpole goby =

Tadpole goby Temporal range: Middle Miocene to present

Genus of fishes

The tadpole-gobies (Benthophilus), also called pugolovkas (which means "tadpole" in Russian), are a genus of Ponto-Caspian fish in the family Gobiidae.

They are distributed in the fresh and brackish waters of basins of the Black Sea, Caspian Sea and the Sea of Azov, up to salinities of about 20 ‰. They typically live in habitats such as the deep waters of the Caspian (salinity about 13 ‰) and in the deltas, estuaries and coastal waters of the Ponto-Caspian.

Tadpole-gobies are small fish, never larger than 15 cm (5.9 in), and usually smaller. Their life span is about one year. After spawning they die.

== Species ==
There are currently 21 recognized species in this genus:

- Benthophilus abdurahmanovi Ragimov, 1978 (Abdurahmanov's pugolovka)
- Benthophilus baeri Kessler, 1877 (Baer pugolovka)
- Benthophilus casachicus Ragimov, 1978
- Benthophilus ctenolepidus Kessler, 1877
- Benthophilus durrelli Boldyrev & Bogutskaya, 2004 (Don tadpole-goby)
- Benthophilus granulosus Kessler, 1877 (Granular pugolovka)
- Benthophilus grimmi Kessler, 1877
- Benthophilus kessleri L. S. Berg, 1927
- Benthophilus leobergius L. S. Berg, 1949 (Caspian stellate tadpole-goby)
- Benthophilus leptocephalus Kessler, 1877
- Benthophilus leptorhynchus Kessler, 1877 (Short-snout pugolovka)
- Benthophilus macrocephalus (Pallas, 1787) (Caspian tadpole goby)
- Benthophilus magistri Iljin, 1927 (Azov tadpole goby)
- Benthophilus mahmudbejovi Ragimov, 1976 (Small-spine tadpole-goby)
- Benthophilus nudus L. S. Berg, 1898 (Black Sea tadpole-goby)
- Benthophilus persicus Kovačić, Esmaeili, Zarei, Abbasi & Schliewen, 2021
- Benthophilus pinchuki Ragimov, 1982
- Benthophilus ragimovi Boldyrev & Bogutskaya, 2004
- Benthophilus spinosus Kessler, 1877 (Spiny pugolovka)
- Benthophilus stellatus (Sauvage, 1874) (Stellate tadpole-goby)
- Benthophilus svetovidovi Pinchuk & Ragimov, 1979

The fossil species †Benthophilus styriacus Schwarzhans, Bradić & Bratishko, 2016 and †?Benthophilus ovisulcus Schwarzhans, Bradić & Bratishko, 2016 are known from fossil otoliths from the Middle Miocene of Romania.

Genetic studies in the Volga-Kama basin have revealed that invasive populations consist of a mixture of two phylogenetic lineages. One lineage, widely distributed in the new range, is genetically identical to the Don tadpole-goby (Benthophilus durrelli), likely introduced accidentally during historical mysid acclimatization efforts from the Azov basin. The second lineage, of Caspian origin, corresponds to Benthophilus stellatus sensu stricto, making the Lower Volga a mixing zone for these distinct genetic groups.
