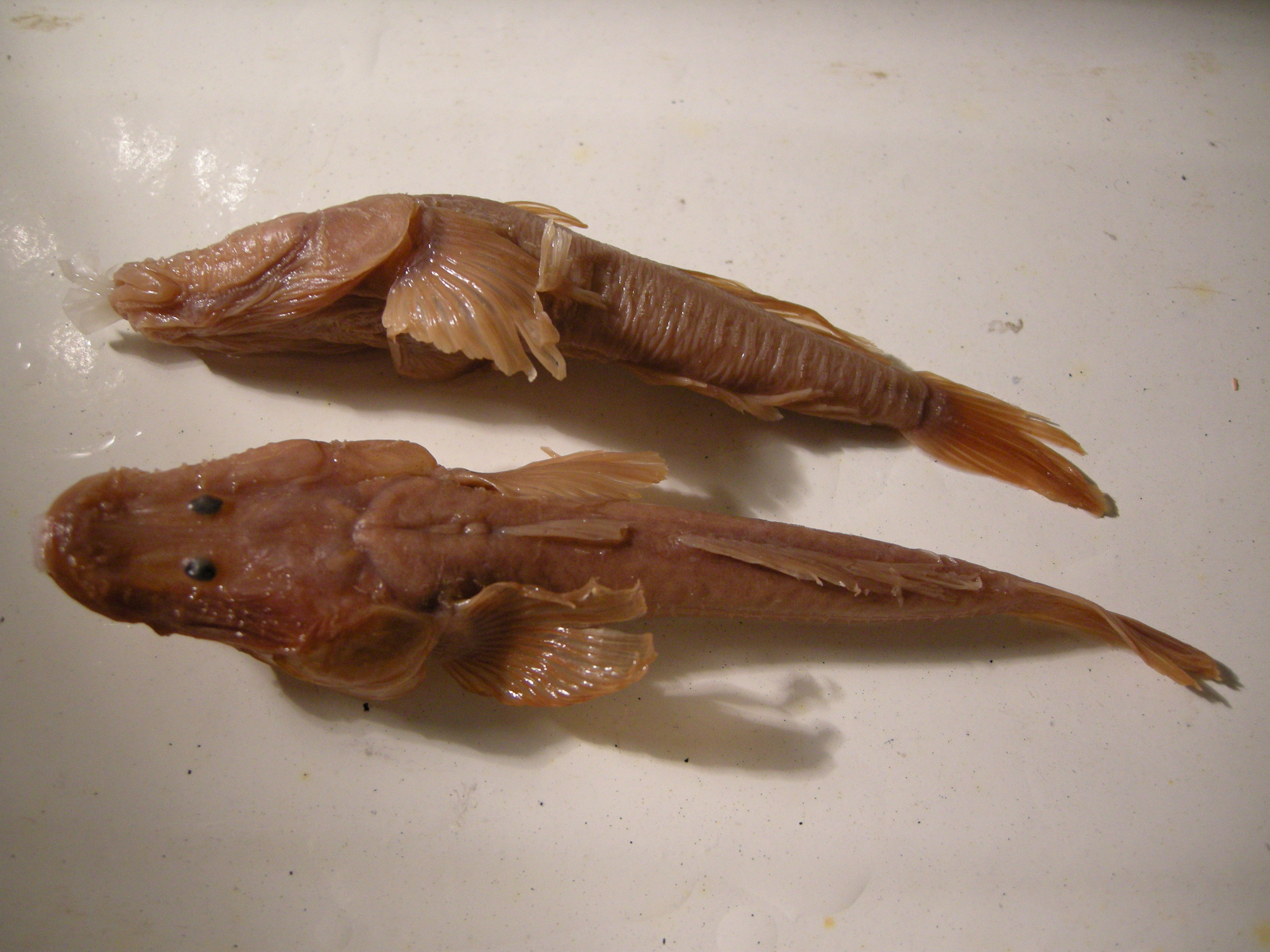

Conservation status
- Least Concern (IUCN 3.1)

Scientific classification
- Kingdom: Animalia
- Phylum: Chordata
- Class: Actinopterygii
- Order: Gobiiformes
- Family: Gobiidae
- Genus: Anatirostrum; Iljin, 1930
- Species: A. profundorum

Binomial name
- Anatirostrum profundorum (L. S. Berg, 1927)

Synonyms
- Benthophilus profundorum Berg, 1927

= Duckbill pugolovka =

Species of fish in the Caspian sea

The duckbill pugolovka (Anatirostrum profundorum) is a species of gobiid fish endemic to the southern part of the Caspian Sea. It is characterized by its special flattened and elongated head that resembles a duck's bill. It is the only known species in its genus.

It was initially found in 1904 at a depth of 294 metres (965 ft) (arguably 447 m (1,467 ft)). Only recently more samples of this species have been collected from Iranian waters, where it mainly lives at 50–100 m (160–330 ft) depth. The fish are on average 8 centimetres (3.1 in) long and at maximum 13 centimetres (5.1 in).
