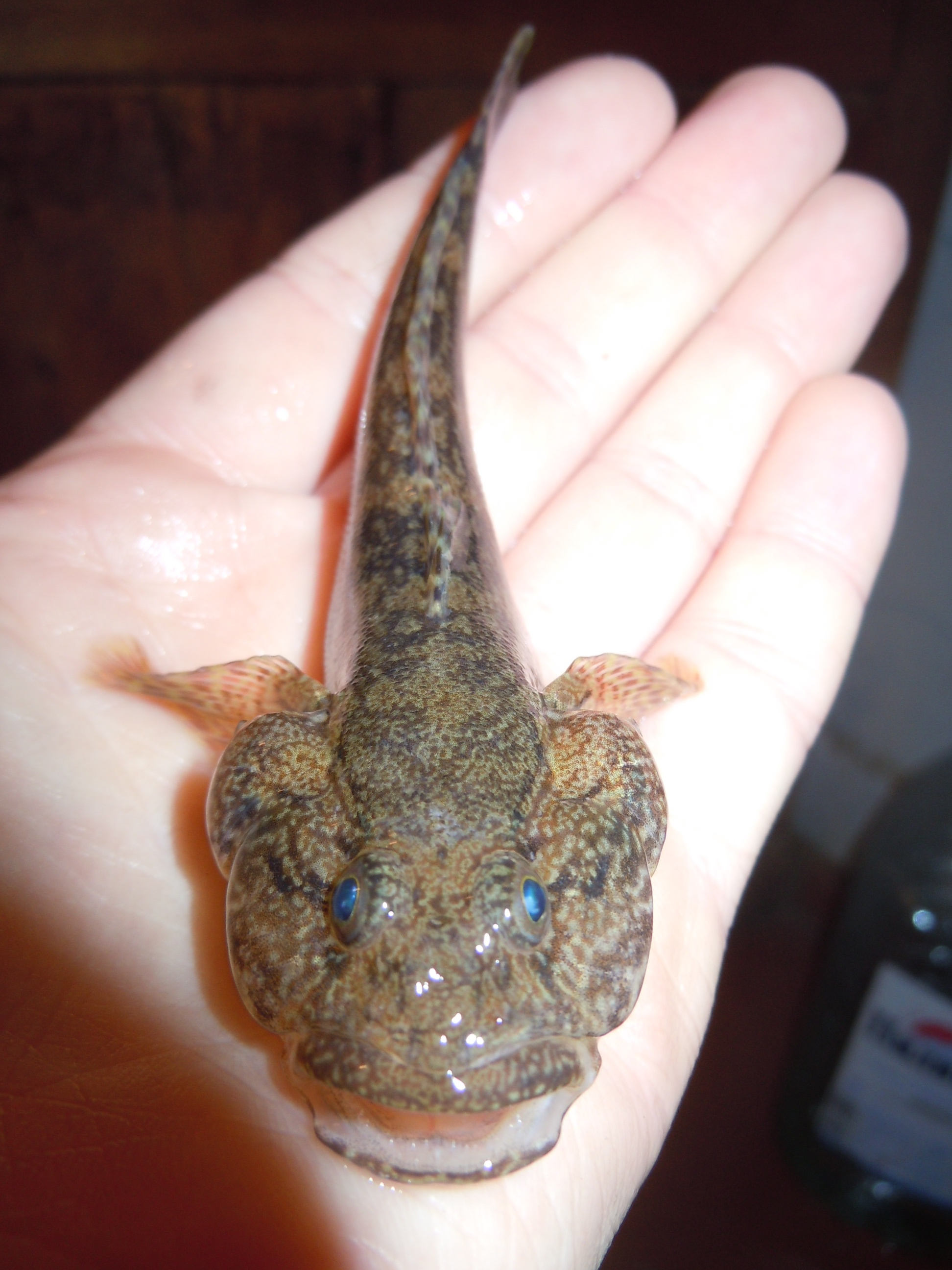

Conservation status
- Least Concern (IUCN 3.1)

Scientific classification
- Kingdom: Animalia
- Phylum: Chordata
- Class: Actinopterygii
- Division: Teleostei
- Order: Gobiiformes
- Family: Gobiidae
- Genus: Ponticola
- Species: P. gorlap

Binomial name
- Ponticola gorlap (Iljin, 1949)

Synonyms
- Neogobius kessleri gorlap Iljin, 1949; Neogobius gorlap Iljin, 1949; Neogobius iljini Vasil'eva & Vasil'ev, 1996

= Ponticola gorlap =

Species of fish

Ponticola gorlap, or the Caspian bighead goby, is a species of goby, a benthic fish native to the Caspian Sea basin. It is widespread in lower parts of many rivers in Iran, and also found in Azerbaijan and Turkmenistan. In Russia, it occurred in the lowest part of the Volga up to Astrakhan until 1977, but has thereafter spread upstream. In 2000 it was recorded as being established in the Ivankovo and Rybinsk Reservoirs in the Moscow region, and already invaded the Don drainage by way of the Volga–Don Canal in 1972. The Ponticola gorlap is now frequently encountered from the Volga Delta up to the Middle Volga reservoirs, and has recently become common in the Upper Volga.

This species occurs in sheltered environments, such as inshore fresh or brackish waters of estuaries, lagoons, lakes and large rivers, where it prefers habitats with a well vegetated rock or firmly packed sand substrate. It can reach a length of 20 centimetres (7.9 in) SL, and a common size is 12 centimetres (4.7 in) SL.
