= Benthophilus ctenolepidus =

Scientific classification
- Domain: Eukaryota
- Kingdom: Animalia
- Phylum: Chordata
- Class: Actinopterygii
- Order: Gobiiformes
- Family: Gobiidae
- Genus: Benthophilus
- Species: B. ctenolepidus

Binomial name
- Benthophilus ctenolepidus Kessler, 1877
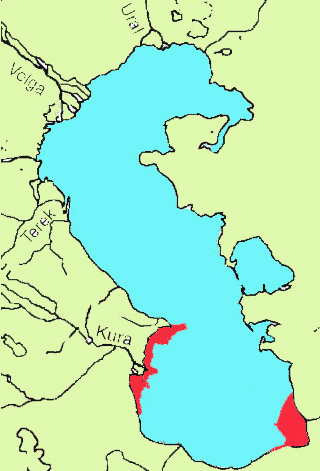
- The range of the species

Synonyms
- Benthophilus magistri lencoranicus Ragimov, 1982

Species of fish

Benthophilus ctenolepidus is a species of goby widespread along the southern coasts of the Caspian Sea: in the Gorgansky Bay, also from Absheron to Astara at south.
