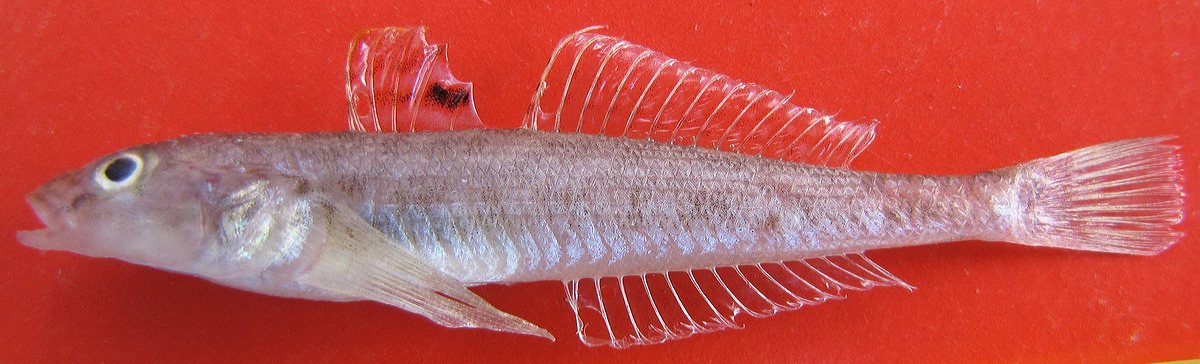
- A specimen from the northern Caspian Sea

Conservation status
- Least Concern (IUCN 3.1)

Scientific classification
- Kingdom: Animalia
- Phylum: Chordata
- Class: Actinopterygii
- Division: Teleostei
- Order: Gobiiformes
- Family: Gobiidae
- Genus: Neogobius
- Species: N. pallasi

Binomial name
- Neogobius pallasi (L. S. Berg, 1916)

Synonyms
- Gobius fluviatilis pallasi L. S. Berg, 1916; Neogobius fluviatilis pallasi (L. S. Berg, 1916)

= Neogobius pallasi =

Species of fish

Neogobius pallasi, the Caspian sand goby or the Caspian monkey goby, is a species of fish native to fresh and brackish waters of the Caspian Sea basin including the Volga drainage up to the vicinity of Moscow. It has been introduced into the Aral basin. This species of goby can reach a length of 20 centimetres (7.9 in) SL. It is also important to local commercial fisheries.

Earlier it was considered as the Caspian subspecies of the Monkey goby, N. fluviatilis pallasi, but is now considered a full species in its own right. The specific name honours the naturalist and explorer Peter Simon Pallas (1741-1811) whose posthumous description of this taxon was published in 1814.
