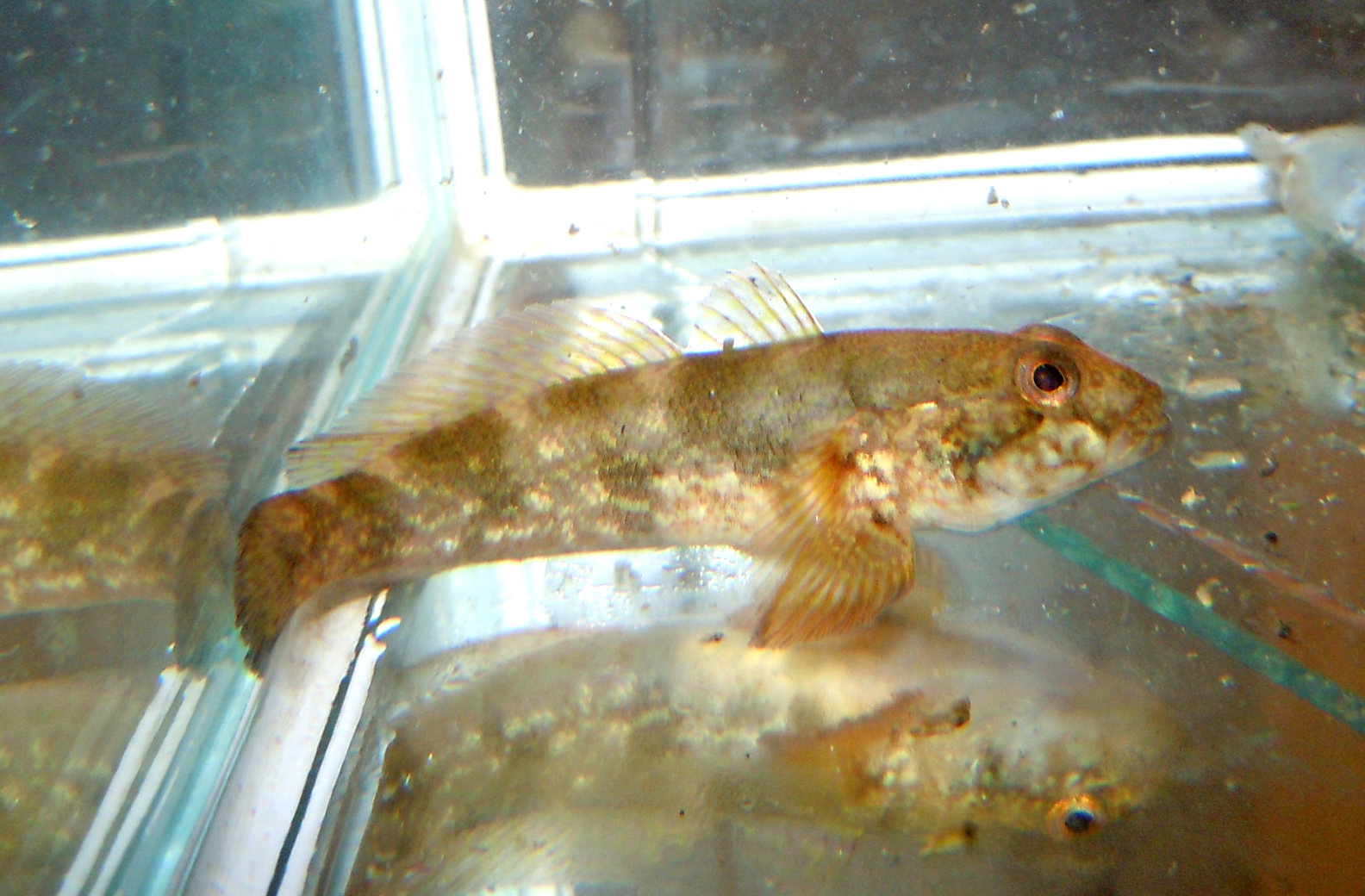

Scientific classification
- Domain: Eukaryota
- Kingdom: Animalia
- Phylum: Chordata
- Class: Actinopterygii
- Order: Gobiiformes
- Family: Gobiidae
- Genus: Ponticola
- Species: P. ratan

Binomial name
- Ponticola ratan (Nordmann, 1840)

Synonyms
- Gobius ratan Nordmann, 1840; Neogobius ratan (Nordmann, 1840); Neogobius ratan ratan (Nordmann, 1840); Gobius goebelii Kessler, 1874; Neogobius ratan goebeli (Kessler, 1874); Gobius bogdanowi Kessler, 1874; Neogobius bogdanowi (Kessler, 1874)

= Ratan goby =

Species of fish

The ratan goby (Ponticola ratan) is a species of goby native to brackish and marine waters of the Black Sea, the Sea of Azov and the Caspian Sea. In the Caspian Sea it is presented by subspecies Ponticola ratan goebeli. It occurs in inshore waters, inhabiting areas with stone or gravel substrates. This species can reach a length of 20 centimetres (7.9 in) TL.
