= Cheleken Peninsula =

Cheleken Peninsula Челекен полуостров Neftyanoy
- Peninsula
- Location within Caspian Sea Location within Turkmenistan
- Coordinates: 39°29′00″N 53°18′30″E
- Country: Turkmenistan
- Region: Balkan Region
- Sea: Caspian Sea

Area
  - Total: 500 km^{2} (190 sq mi)
- Elevation: 100 m (330 ft)

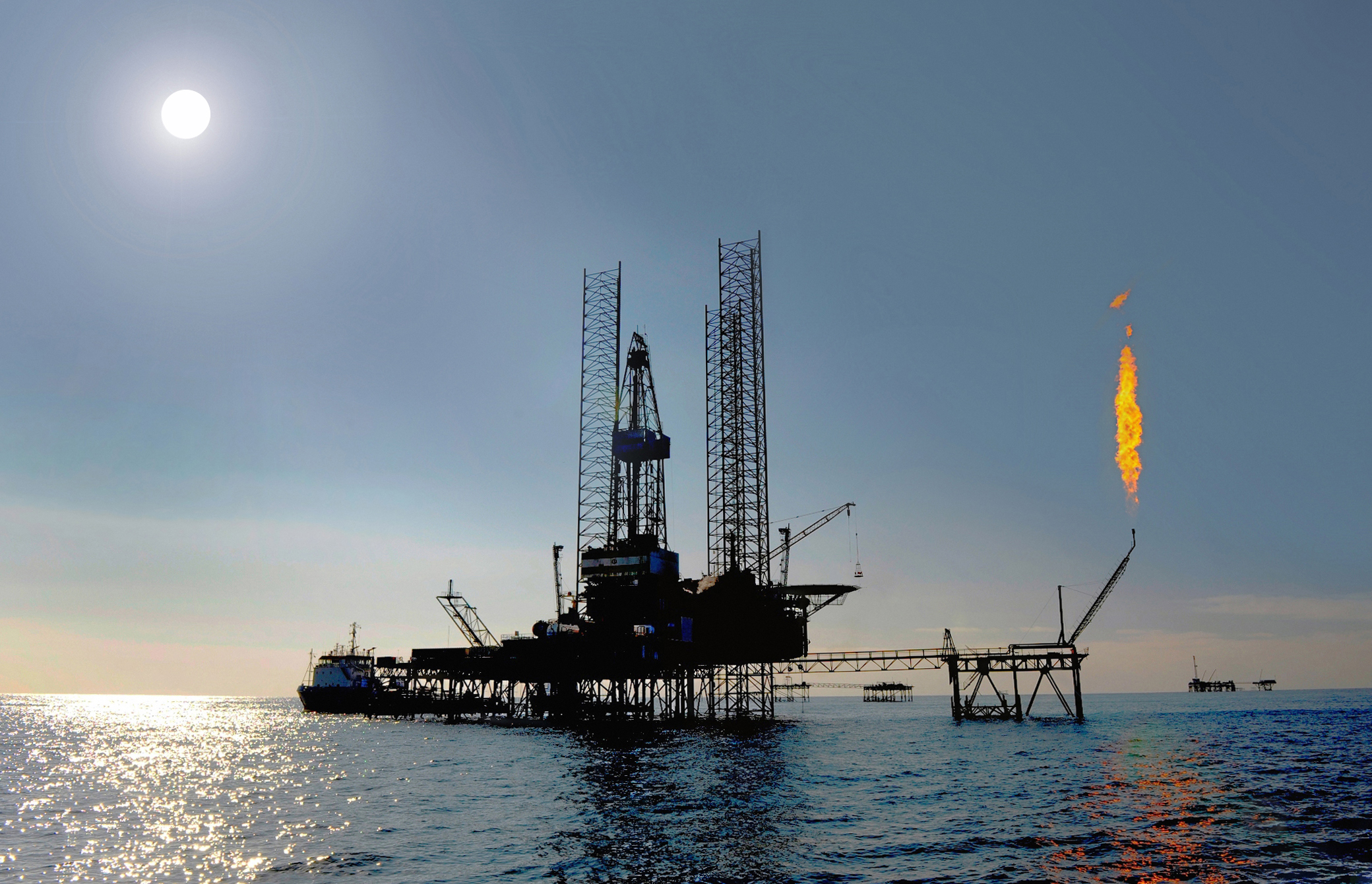
Oil platform off the Cheleken Peninsula

The Cheleken Peninsula (Russian: Челекен полуостров), (Persian: خلیج چهارکان) is a peninsula located in western Turkmenistan, in the eastern shores of the Caspian Sea.

The city of Hazar, former Cheleken, is located in the peninsula, which administratively belongs to Turkmenistan's Balkan Province.

== Geography ==
The Cheleken Peninsula is about 40 km long and 22 km wide. It borders on the Caspian Sea in the west and with the Türkmenbaşy Gulf (former Krasnovodsk Bay) in the north. The peninsula has a continental dry climate with a precipitation of 150 mm/year. The area is desert and the central part is elevated terrain averaging 100 m elevation, with 25 m high cliffs in the central part of the western shore, while the eastern shore is low and sandy.

The Peninsula has two spits or bars at the end running meridionally from north to south; the northern or right spit is also known as the Kafaldja Peninsula, while the southern or left spit running towards Ogurja Ada (Ogurchinsky Island) is known as the Dervish Peninsula. From time to time, such as in 1995, the Cheleken Peninsula becomes an island again when the level of the waters of the Caspian rises. There are mud volcanoes in the Cheleken Peninsula.

== Cartography ==
The Cheleken Peninsula was formerly an island. It was plotted on a rough map for the first time in 1715 by Alexander Bekovich-Cherkassky as 'Chereken Island'. The area was mapped by Fedor Ivanovich Soimonov during the Caspian Expedition, which surveyed the Caspian Sea from 1719 to 1727 and in some maps of the 18th to 19th centuries it appeared as 'Neftyanoy' or as 'Neftonia'. The island was also described later by G. S. Karelin in 1832. Karelin commented that there were four types of crude oil in the Cheleken Peninsula. The island merged with the mainland after 1937.

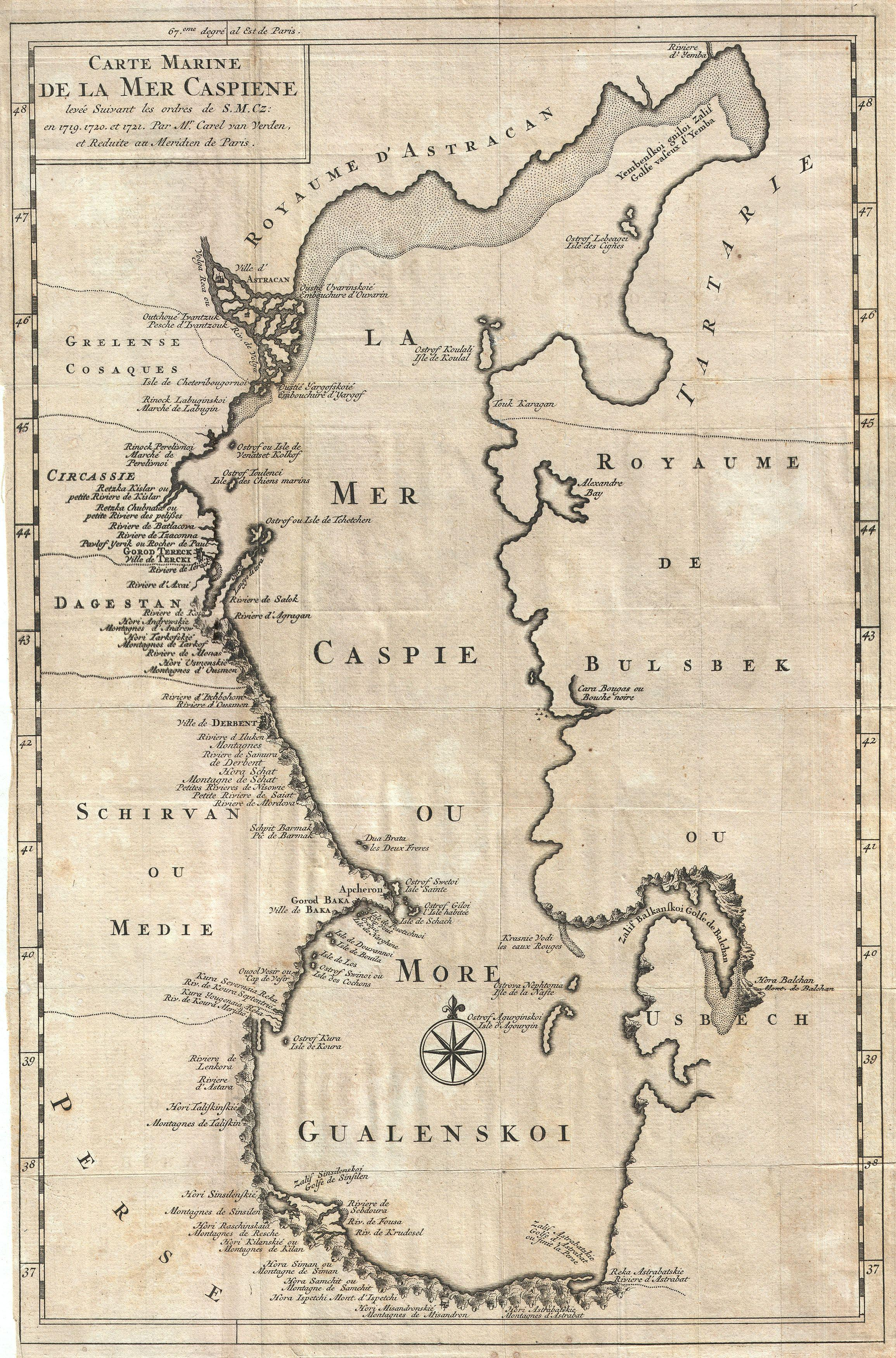
1721 Van Verden map of the Caspian Sea with Ostrova Neftonia or Ile de la Nafte (Naphtha Island).

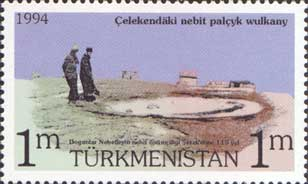
1994 stamp of Turkmenistan showing a sulphur spring in the Cheleken Peninsula.

== See also ==
- Hazar, Turkmenistan
- Ogurja Ada
