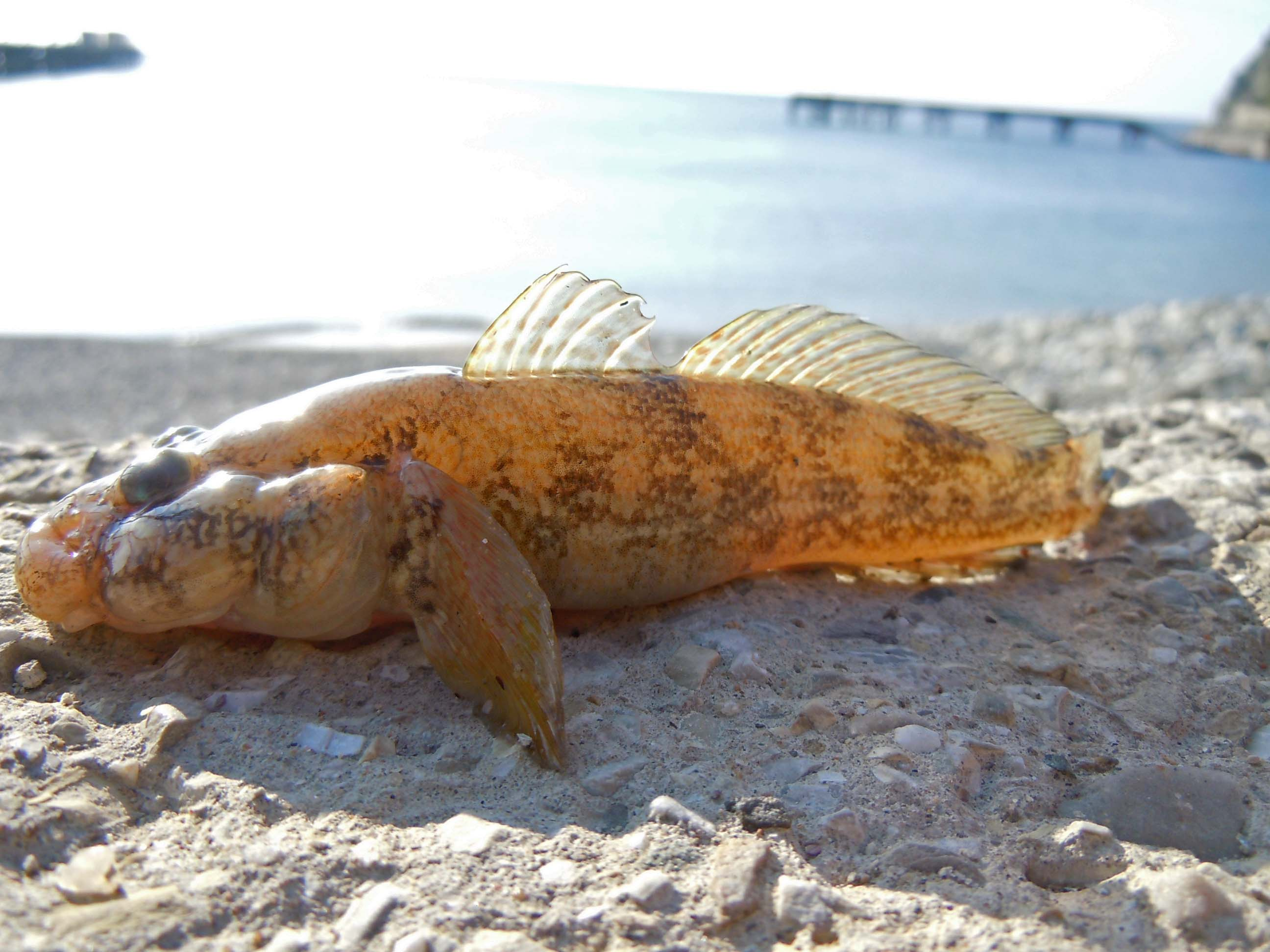
- Flatsnout goby from Caucasus, Black Sea

Conservation status
- Least Concern (IUCN 3.1)

Scientific classification
- Kingdom: Animalia
- Phylum: Chordata
- Class: Actinopterygii
- Division: Teleostei
- Order: Gobiiformes
- Family: Gobiidae
- Genus: Ponticola
- Species: P. platyrostris

Binomial name
- Ponticola platyrostris (Pallas, 1814)

Synonyms
- Gobius platyrostris Pallas, 1814; Neogobius platyrostris (Pallas, 1814)

= Flatsnout goby =

Species of fish

The flatsnout goby (Ponticola platyrostris) is a species of goby endemic to the Black Sea where it is mostly known from inshore waters amongst rocks and boulders. It is occasionally found offshore over areas with gravel substrates. This species can reach a length of 22.5 centimetres (8.9 in) TL.

== Range ==
Native to the north-western and north-eastern parts of the Black Sea (without limans), near the coasts of Crimea, in some parts of the Sea of Azov. In the eastern part of the Black Sea it occurs from the Kerch Strait along all the coast of Caucasus to Batumi. Within the rivers it has been recorded from the Southern Bug.
