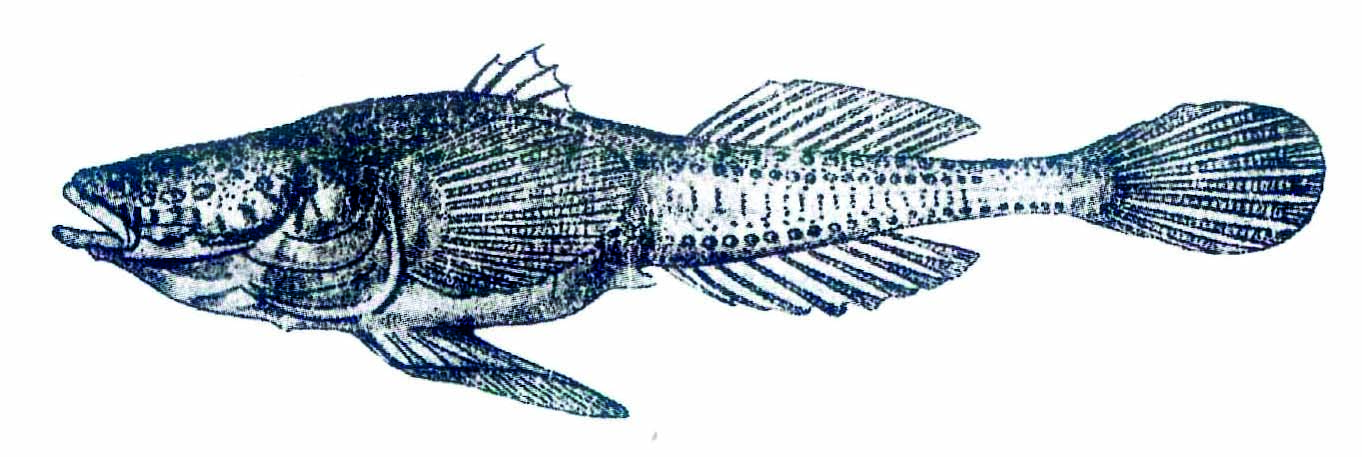

Conservation status
- Least Concern (IUCN 3.1)

Scientific classification
- Kingdom: Animalia
- Phylum: Chordata
- Class: Actinopterygii
- Order: Gobiiformes
- Family: Gobiidae
- Genus: Benthophilus
- Species: B. magistri

Binomial name
- Benthophilus magistri Iljin, 1927
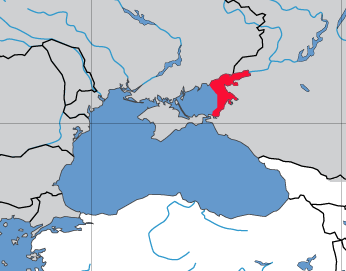
- The range of the Azov tadpole goby

Synonyms
- Benthophilus macrocephalus magistri Iljin, 1927

= Azov tadpole goby =

Species of fish

The Azov tadpole goby (Benthophilus magistri) is a species of goby native to the basin of the Sea of Azov, specifically in the near-estuary zone of the Kuban River, to west until Ukrainian part of the Taganrog Bay and the Strait of Kerch, in the Mius estuary, Yeya estuary, and Akhtanizovskii Liman. This species is only found on silty estuarine bottoms. It can reach a length of 8.4 centimetres (3.3 in) TL.
