= Cape Peschany (Caspian Sea) =

Headland in Kazakhstan

Cape Peschany Мыс Песчаный Kazakh: Песчаный Мүйісі
- Cape
- Location of the cape
- Coordinates: 43°9′4″N 51°16′28″E
- Location: Kazakhstan
- Offshore water bodies: Caspian Sea

Cape Peschany (Kazakh: Песчаный Мүйісі Peschanyi Müiısı; Russian: Мыс Песчаный, Mys Peschanyy) is a headland in Kazakhstan.

== Geography ==
Stretching out southwestwards this headland is located in the eastern coast of the Caspian Sea south of Aktau. Its name means 'Sandy Cape' in Russian.
