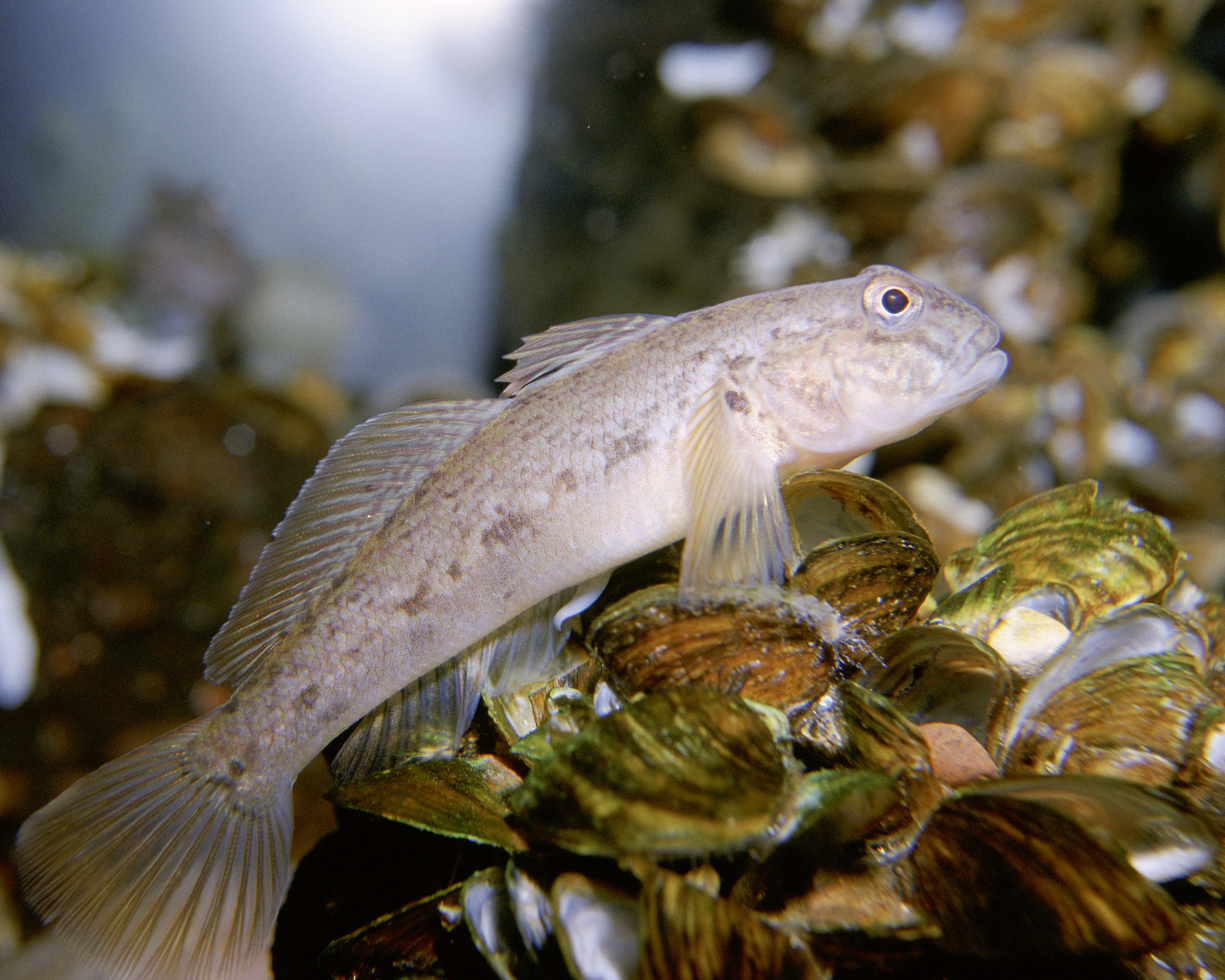
- Round Goby (N. melanostomus)

Scientific classification
- Kingdom: Animalia
- Phylum: Chordata
- Class: Actinopterygii
- Division: Teleostei
- Order: Gobiiformes
- Family: Gobiidae
- Genus: Neogobius; Iljin, 1927

Type species
- Gobius fluviatilis (Pallas, 1814)

Synonyms
- Apollonia Iljin, 1927; Chasar Vasil'eva, 1996; Eichwaldia Smitt, 1900; Eichwaldiella Whitley, 1930

= Neogobius =

Genus of fishes

Neogobius is a genus of gobies, native to Black Sea and the Caspian Sea basins. It is part of the broader Benthophilinae subfamily which is also endemic to the same region. Nevertheless, two Neogobius species have recently turned out to be highly invasive and spread across Europe and even to the Great Lakes of North America.

== Species ==
There are currently four recognized species in this genus:

- Neogobius caspius (Eichwald, 1831) (Caspian goby)
- Neogobius fluviatilis (Pallas, 1814) (Monkey goby)
- Neogobius melanostomus (Pallas, 1814) (Round goby)
- Neogobius pallasi (Berg, 1916) (Caspian sand goby)

Of these, N. caspius and N. pallasi are endemic to the Caspian basin. N. fluviatilis is a sister species of N. pallasi in the Black Sea basin. N. melanostomus, the round goby, is native to both basins, and is the most aggressively spreading fish to exotic watersheds.
