= Ogurja Ada =

Island in the Caspian Sea, Turkmenistan

Ogurchinskiy Island
Turkmen: Ogurjaly adasy
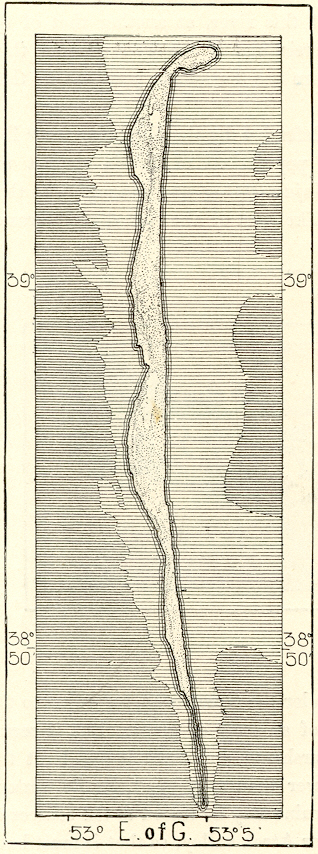
- 19th-century Russian map of Ogurchinskiy Island

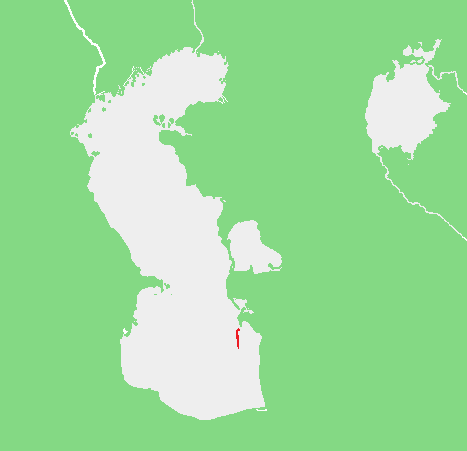
- Location of Ogurja Ada in the Caspian Sea

Geography
- Location: Caspian Sea
- Coordinates: 39°03′39″N 53°02′36″E
- Area: 45 km^{2} (17 sq mi)
- Length: 42 km (26.1 mi)
- Width: 1.5 km (0.93 mi)

Administration
- Turkmenistan
- Region: Balkan Province

Demographics
- Population: No permanent residents

Ogurja Ada (sometimes also spelt "Ogurga") is the largest island in both Turkmenistan and the Caspian Sea by area. Ogurja Island is also widely known by its Russian name, Ogurchinskiy Island (Ostrov Ogurchinskiy).

== Geography ==
Ogurja is a desert island that lies not far from the coast in the southeastern Caspian Sea. It is located 17 km SSW of the southern tip of the Cheleken Peninsula.

Ogurja Ada is very long and narrow. It runs from north to south, lengthening 42 km and a maximum width of 1.5 km. It is made up of low sand dunes, mostly covered with grass and bushes. The northern end, which was formerly a compact mass, was broken up into smaller islets by wave action. Administratively, Ogurja Ada belongs to the Balkan Province of Turkmenistan. The island has no permanent settlements owing to the lack of fresh water.

== History ==
The earliest documentation of the island is from 1392. In the 15th and the 17th centuries, Ogurchinskiy was a refuge for pirates and wayfarers. During the mid-to-late 19th century, after the Russian Empire established control over the eastern Caspian coast, it was utilized for medical purposes as a leper colony. Several abandoned Russian and Soviet-period structures, including small service buildings, radio masts, and two helipads, remain on the island.

== Environment ==
Caspian seals and varied marine birds inhabit the island. Ogurja Ada is part of the Hazar Nature Reserve of Turkmenistan. According to Kaspika, these seals use the island as a seasonal resting site, with historic numbers ranging from tens to several thousand depending on the decade and time period. In 2002, observations of seal breeding took place.

The island has been designated an Important Bird Area by BirdLife International because it supports breeding colonies of gulls and terns. There is an isolated resident population of chukar partridge.
