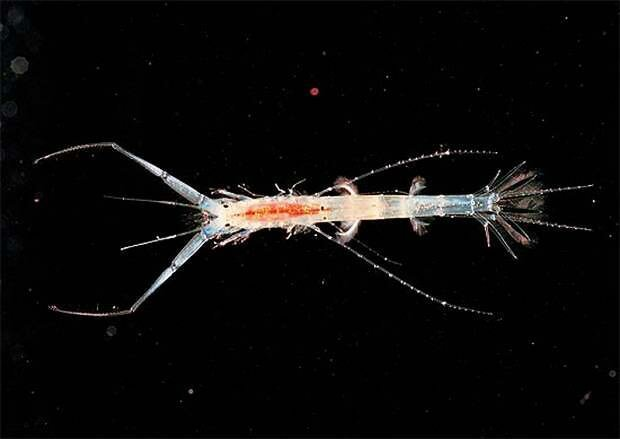

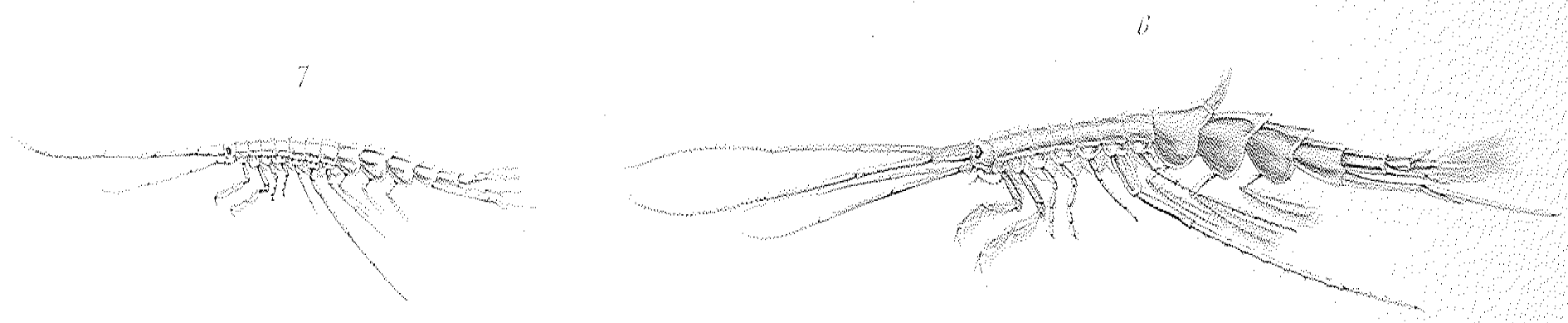

Scientific classification
- Kingdom: Animalia
- Phylum: Arthropoda
- Clade: Pancrustacea
- Class: Malacostraca
- Order: Amphipoda
- Superfamily: Gammaroidea
- Family: Macrohectopidae
- Genus: Macrohectopus; Stebbing, 1906
- Species: M. branickii

Binomial name
- Macrohectopus branickii (Dybowsky B.N., 1874)
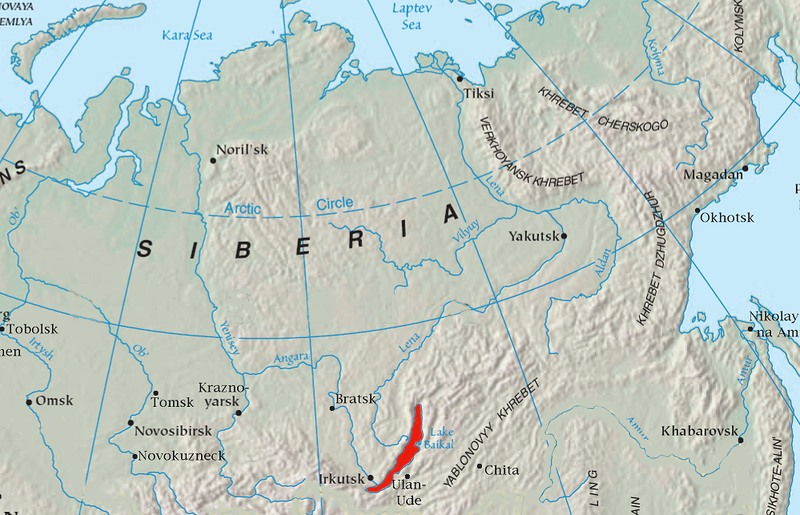
- Lake Baikal within Eastern Siberia

Synonyms
- Constantia branickii Dybowsky, 1874 (Unavailable)

= Macrohectopus =

Pelagic freshwater amphipod

Macrohectopus branickii is a species of amphipod (a group containing the scuds) living in the pelagic zone of Lake Baikal, believed to be the only species of amphipod in this niche within freshwater (many more amphipods are pelagic/planktonic in the sea, such as the Hyperiids). It is the only known species within the genus Macrohectopus and the only member of the family Macrohectopidae. (Note: The fossil genus Hellenis, previously considered the only other genus in the family, was removed from Macrohectopidae after a 2024 study evaluating it.)

The sheer scale of Lake Baikal allows many species, including M. branickii, to occupy niches which do not exist in other freshwater ecosystems. These pelagic amphipods are prey to many animals within its ecosystem, including the top aquatic predator of the lake, the Baikal seal.

== Description ==
Macrohectopus branickii was described by Benedykt Dybowski, who diagnosed it as possessing two pairs of antennae covered in setae, with the upper pair more robust and elongate, kidney-shaped eyes that each occupy half of the head, smooth body segments, along with keeled and spined tail segments. The laminae of the gills and brood plates are not covered, and are visible from the side.

The chitinous segments are near-transparent, making the animal "clear as water"; (Note: Der Körper dieser schönen, zarten Thiere ist wasserhell, woher man sie beim Schwimmen nur an ihren schwarzen Augen warnehmen kann.) which makes the muscle fibers visible without dissection. This is likely to be a means of camouflage; Cystisoma, a marine amphipod, is similarly transparent to avoid predation. Indeed, Takhteev noted that M. branickii exhibits some ecological parallels with other marine amphipods, those being the Vitjazianidae and Hyperiopsidae families.

Male M. branickii are up to 6 mm (0.24 in) long, immature females are 7–14 mm (0.28–0.55 in), and mature females reach up to 37 mm (1.5 in); they exhibit significant sexual size dimorphism, with some considering the males to be "dwarfed".

The mitochondrial genome of M. branickii was analyzed in 2021; containing 42,256 base pairs, it is the longest sequence known for amphipods and one of the largest genomes within the animal kingdom.

== Ecology ==
Macrohectopus branickii is endemic to Lake Baikal, with the "center" of its range being the deepest, central part of the lake. It prefers waters colder than 4 °C (39 °F).

Lake Baikal contains a great diversity of amphipod species; 40% of all known species of gammaroid amphipods live within this lake, and they have undergone significant adaptive radiation into a plethora of morphological forms. Out of all these species, M. branickii is the only pelagic member of the group; molecular and morphological analysis, however, indicates that the genus originates within Micruropodidae, a family of burrowers, though Micruropus wahli is a capable swimmer and may be caught at the surface through light-fishing; this attraction to light is also observed for the pelagic amphipod. Phototaxis may make them vulnerable to light pollution in littoral zones close to settlements.

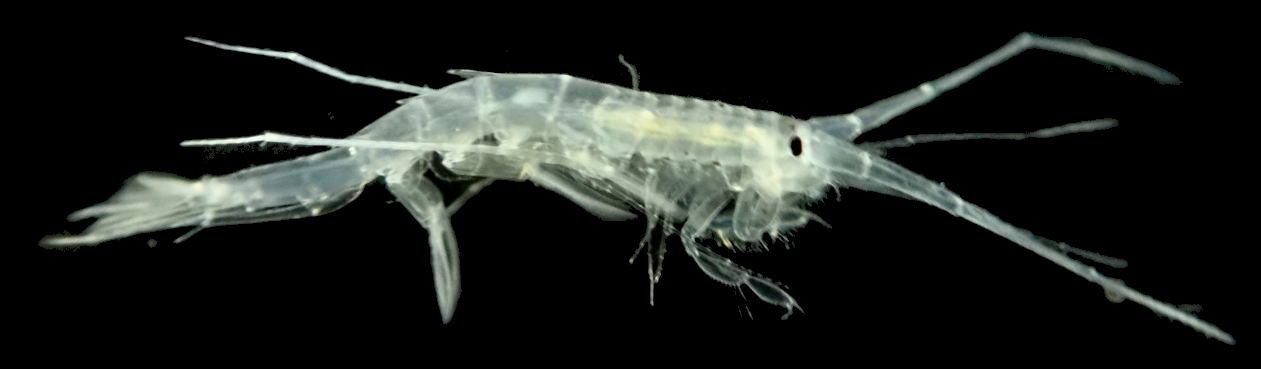
These pelagic amphipods migrate vertically every day

The pelagic amphipod migrates throughout the lake all year round, continuing to do so in their peak breeding season. This species also undergoes diel vertical migration, moving to the surface at night from their daytime depth range of 200–700 m (660–2,300 ft). The larger mature females inhabit the deeper range of this depth compared to smaller individuals. During nighttime, they may be especially abundant in the water column above underwater slopes. The density of amphipods is such that it creates a noticeable scattering layer when using hydroacoustic sensors, akin to the deep scattering layer in the ocean. These sensors are one method used to survey the population of these crustaceans. The pelagic amphipods tend to feed more on zooplankton the larger they grow, though the exact ratios vary between individuals; these prey items are consistently located above 50 m (160 ft) depth throughout the day.

=== Trophic ecology ===
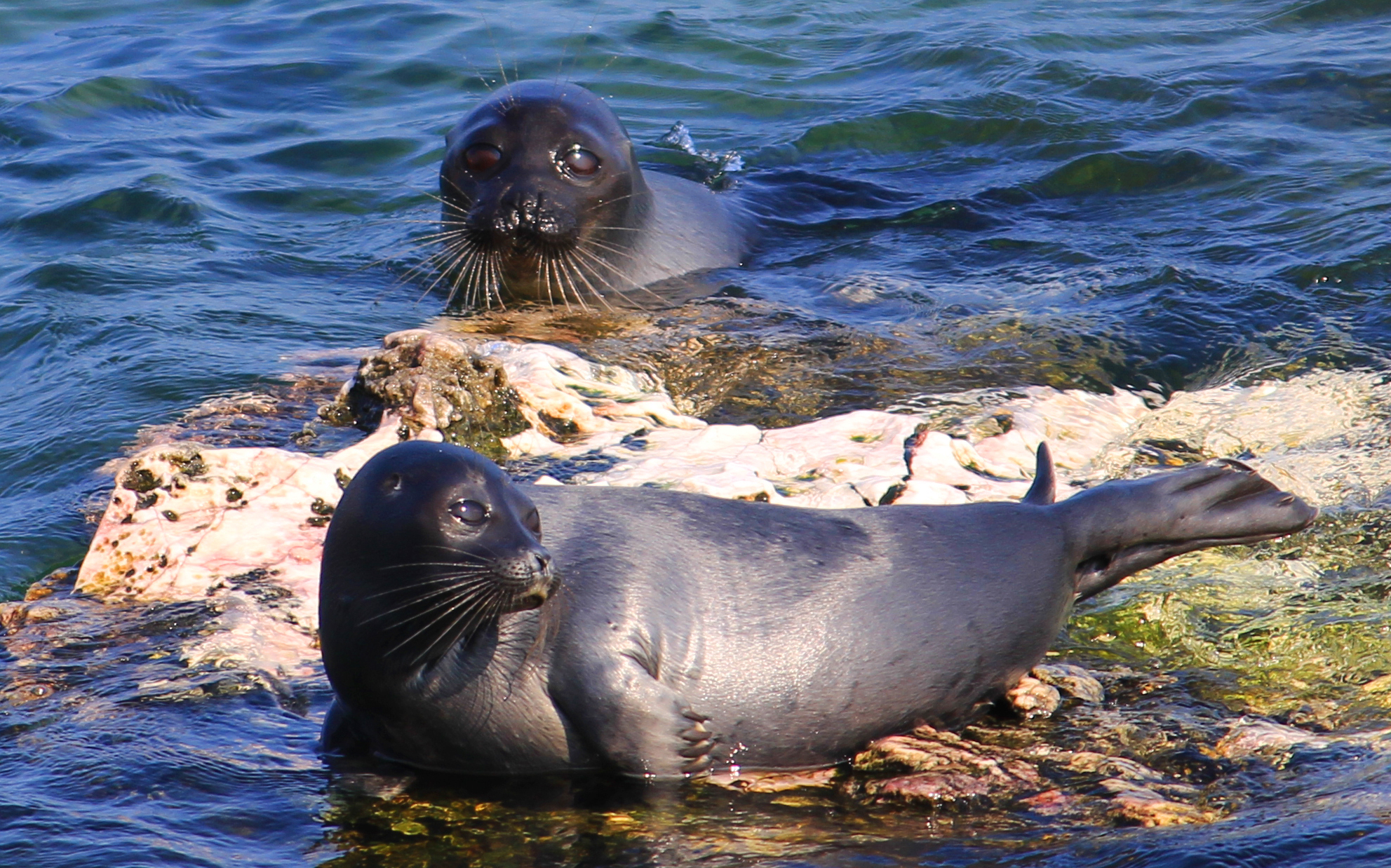
Predators of this species include the Baikal seal

Macrohectopus branickii is the main species of macroplankton within the lake, being an important part of the food chain; the microcrustaceans Epischura baikalensis and Cyclops kolensis feed on phytoplankton (predominantly Aulacoseira baicalensis). They then fall prey to the pelagic amphipod, which in turn feed various fish such as omul (Coregonus migratorius), sculpins (Comephorus spp., Cottocomephorus spp.), and the seal, which feeds on the fish and the amphipods. During the amphipod's diel migration, some of them may rise up too fast and become temporarily stuck on the water's surface after breaching; they must break through the surface tension to resubmerge. Before resubmerging, they are vulnerable to the water bat Myotis petax, which "trawl up" the amphipods for an easy meal. On occasion they may also rise up to the surface during daytime, and seagulls are quick to take advantage of this opportunity.

Its role within the lake's ecosystem has been compared to that of Antarctic krill and mysis shrimp, being an important lower-level consumer due to its abundance; the density of pelagic amphipods has been estimated at tens of grams per 1 m^{2} (11 sq ft), with total numbers reaching several million animals and constituting 90-99% of the zooplanktonic biomass. Annual biomass production of M. branickii is calculated to be around 330,000 t (360,000 tons).
