= Varnupiai =

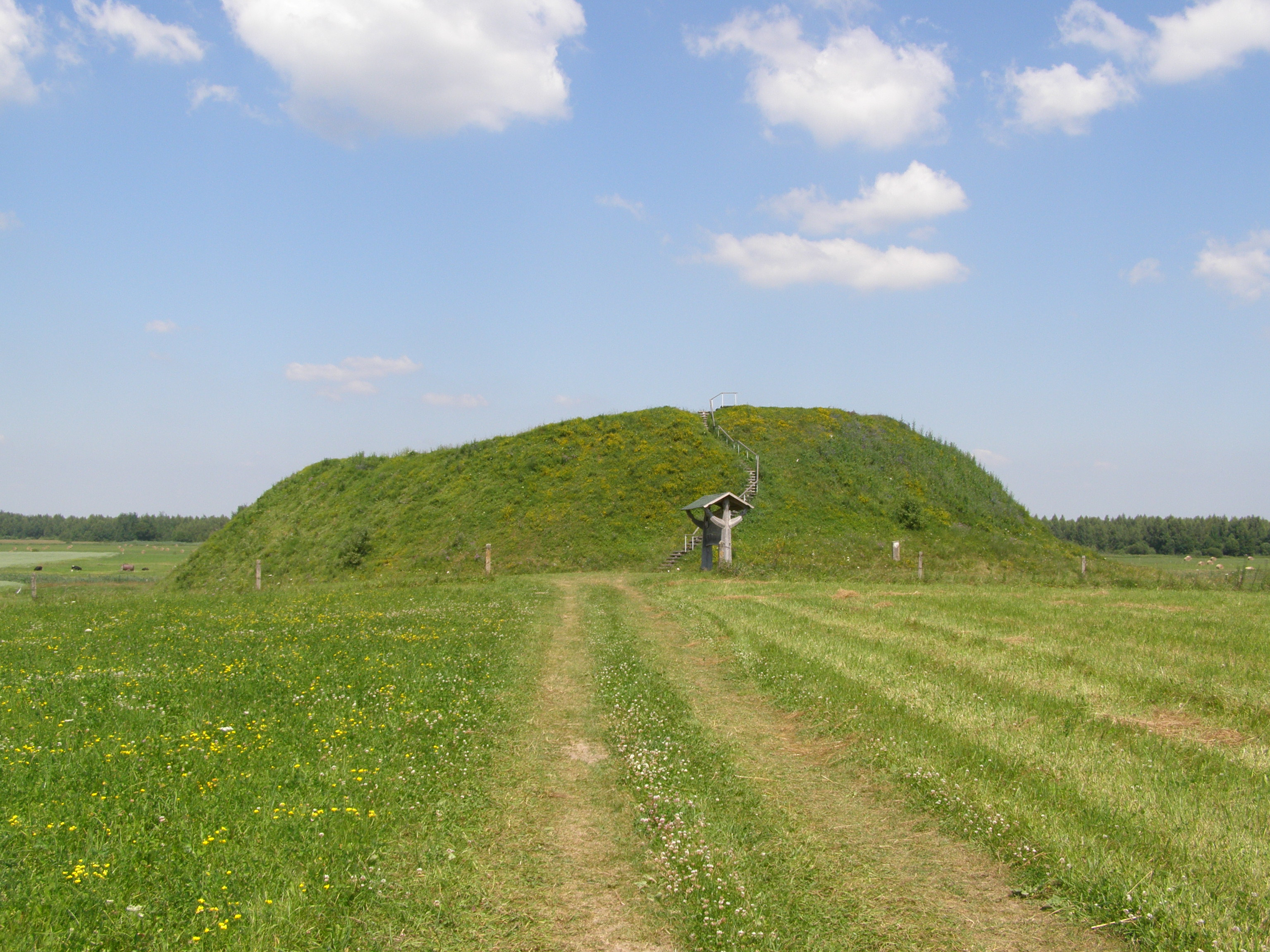
- Varnupiai mound

- Location within Lithuania
- Coordinates: 54°29′0″N 23°31′0″E
- Country: Lithuania
- Ethnographic region: Suvalkija
- County: Marijampolė County
- Municipality: Marijampolė municipality
- Elderate: Igliauka elderate

Population (2021)
  - Total: 160
- Time zone: UTC+2 (EET)
  - Summer (DST): UTC+3 (EEST)

Varnupiai is a small village in the Marijampolė municipality, Lithuania, 4 miles southwest of Daukšiai.

== Demographics ==
As of the 2021 census, Varnupiai has a population of 160 residents. The village covers an area of 10.72 square kilometers, resulting in a population density of approximately 14.93 people per square kilometer. Over the past decade, Varnupiai has experienced a slight population decline, with an annual decrease of 1.8% between 2011 and 2021.

In terms of gender distribution, the village has a relatively balanced population, with 75 males (46.9%) and 85 females (53.1%) recorded in 2021.

== Notable landmarks ==
On the area of the village stands Varnupiai Mound, known since ancient days. The legend says it was created by Lithuanians bringing lands with their hats in winter, as a way to hide from the Crusaders. In the present day the Mound has its own festival, celebrating international archaeological days.

Near the Mound, there is a gray-pink coarse-grained granite stone irregular in shape, called Patkaviniu. Carved into the stone there is a horseshoe approximately 13x10 cm, which is probably the source of its name, due to the Polish word "podkowa" meaning horseshoe. In 1972, it was declared an archaeological monument and is currently protected as a mythological heritage object of regional significance. In 2008, a wooden roof pole was erected near the stone through the efforts of the Varnupiai community. There are many legends about how the horseshoe mark was carved into the stone, including by Teutonic Knights, Napoleon's army, or the devil.

== People ==
- Christopher Szwernicki (1814–1894), Polish–Lithuanian Roman Catholic priest
