= Christopher Szwernicki =

Father Christopher Szwernicki
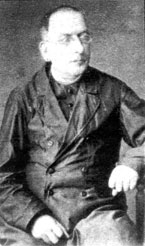
- Born: September 8, 1814; Varnupiai
- Died: November 26, 1894 (aged 80); Irkutsk
- Cause of death: brutally beating
- Known for: Apostle of Siberia
- Religion: Roman Catholic
- Congregations served: Congregation of Marian Fathers

Father Christopher Szwernicki /ʃvɛərnɪtski/ (Lithuanian: Kristupas Švernickis; September 8, 1814 – November 26, 1894) was a Polish–Lithuanian priest of the Congregation of Marian Fathers. In 1849, he was deported to Irkutsk, where he worked until his death as a parish priest of the largest parish in the world (which occupied all of Siberia from the Arctic Ocean to China). In 1888 he was dubbed "Apostle of Siberia" by Pope Leo XIII.

== Life ==
Christopher Szwernicki was born on September 8, 1814, in the Varnupiai village near Marijampolė to Adam and Katarzyna née Woclawska. His birth name was Joseph. At age 7, he went to school at Marijampolė, first to grammar school for three years, and then to the middle school run by the Marian Fathers in their monastery.

When the November Uprising began, Szwernicki enlisted in uhlan's regiment, commandeered by Józef Dwernicki. He was twice wounded, in the battles of Stoczek and Nowa Wieś. After the uprising collapsed he went back to the monastery; there, in 1832, he finished middle school.

At this time he entered the Order and changed his name to Krzysztof (Christopher). On December 24, 1837, he was ordained to the priesthood in Sejny by Bishop Pawel Straszynski. He worked with the deaf in Warsaw, where he helped to start the Institute for the Deaf and learned methods of teaching them. He organized and ran a similar school in Marijampolė.

In 1846, he was arrested for his patriotic activity and put into Warsaw Citadel, where he spent five years under strict investigation. He was sentenced to be exiled to the Province of Irkutsk, and was transported in 1852. When he came to Irkutsk, he obtained permission to fulfill his priestly duties at the local church. He initially helped old Fr. Hacicki (like a vicar), and after the latter's death in 1856 he became parish priest of Assumption of the Blessed Virgin Mary Church in Irkutsk. He renewed the church and installed a harmonium, made in the Debain's factory in Paris.

In 1855, Szwernicki, like most Polish political exiles, was pardoned by the Tsar, but he elected to stay in Irkutsk. In 1859, under orders from Governor-General Muravyov, he journeyed through Siberia to provide spiritual care for Catholic soldiers. In his pastoral care he met (a future saint and a Carmelite friar) Raphael Kalinowski, who was exiled to Siberia after the January Uprising.

In 1881–1885, Swernicki built a new church in Irkutsk. The previous one, which had been built of wood, was burned in the large conflagration of the town in 1879. He also built and then ran an orphanage.

In January 1894, Szwernicki was brutally attacked and beaten. He never recovered from his injuries and died on November 26, 1894. He was buried in the Irkutsk church.

Six years after his death, Benedykt Dybowski said of him,

"By 40 years, when he was a parish priest in one of the largest parishs, Siberia, he saw little happiness among people, but much more times he witnessed to continuous heavy and extreme poverty, many bitter tears and often to pessimism. Although he was continuously contacted with disaster, he had never been neutral its audience. On the contrary, while he was experiencing deep torment of exile's life, he, with all his forces and possibility, tried to help suffering, everywhere, he was. by giving them alongside material support, spiritual comfort together with this quiet exposed hope, which only one can prevent people from pessimism and despair."

== Awards ==
Szwernicki was awarded:

- 1857 - by the Consistory of Mohylew, a cross and an order for his participation in the Crimean War
- 1870 − the third class Order of St. Stanislaus
- 1879 − a third class Order of St. Anne
- 1888 − Pope Leo XIII titled him the "Apostle of Siberia"
