= Joan Benson =

American keyboardist (1925–2020)

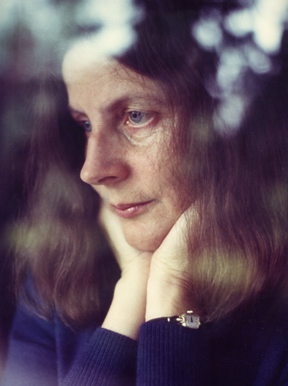

Background information
- Born: October 9, 1925; St. Paul, Minnesota, United States
- Died: January 1, 2020 (aged 94) Eugene, Oregon, United States
- Genres: Renaissance, Viennese Classic, Contemporary
- Occupations: Keyboard player; teacher; writer
- Instruments: Clavichord, fortepiano
- Years active: 1962–2020
- Website: Joan Benson

Joan Benson (October 9, 1925 – January 1, 2020) was an American keyboard player who specialized in the clavichord and fortepiano.

== Biography ==
Benson was of Swedish descent. Born in Saint Paul, Minnesota, she spent her childhood in New Orleans, where she attended Metairie Park Country Day School, one of the first progressive schools in the South. Its emphasis on creativity encouraged her talents in music, painting and poetry.

At sixteen, she studied with pianist-composer Percy Grainger at Interlochen's Summer Music Camp. At seventeen, she attended Longy School of Music in Cambridge, Massachusetts, studying with Boris Godowsky and Melville Smith. It was here she first heard a clavichord, where Erwin Bodky, a faculty member, played several preludes and fugues by J. S. Bach.

Educated at the University of Illinois Urbana-Champaign (Bachelor of Music, Master of Music (1951) and Indiana University School of Music (1953) studying under Anis Fuleihan, she received instruction in Europe from Edwin Fischer, Guido Agosti, Olivier Messiaen, Viola Thern, Fritz Neumeyer, Ruggero Gerlin, and Macário Santiago Kastner before returning to the United States in 1960 to pursue dual careers as a concert keyboardist and university professor. She debuted on the clavichord at the Carmel Bach Festival in 1963 and went on to perform at many concerts in the United States, Europe, and the Far East. From 1968 through 1976, she taught at Stanford University until joining the faculty at the University of Oregon in Eugene, where she taught through 1987. In 1980, she also joined the faculty of the Aston Magna Music Festival in Massachusetts. Among her varied interests was Buddhist meditation. She has been credited with helping to revive interest in the fortepiano and the work of C. P. E. Bach.

Benson died on January 1, 2020, at the age of 94.

== Recordings ==
Freie Fantasie
By Carl Philipp Emanuel Bach in F-sharp minor. Transcription of a clavichord record by Joan Benson (Bridge S 2250)

Rondo in C
Transcription of a clavichord record, by Joan Benson (Bridge S 2250). It was a "recommended recording of the year" (1973) by the Saturday Review. This recording is on clavichords by Thomas Goff of England and Jacobus Verwolf of the Netherlands. The music was composed by Dietrich Ewald von Grotthuß (1751–1786)

- Joan Benson, Clavichord (Repertoire Records, LP, 1962), reissued by Bridge Records, 1972.
- Music of C. P. E. Bach (Orion Master Recordings, Giveon Cornfield, LP, 1976); clavichord and 1795 Broadwood pianoforte
- Works of Haydn and Pasquini (Titanic Records, Ralph Dobmeyer, LP, 1982); original Tosi and Schiedmayer clavichords from Museum of Fine Arts, Boston
- Clavichord Music of Johann Kuhnau and C. P. E. Bach (Focus Recordings, Peter Nothnagel, Early Music Institute, Indiana University School of Music, cassette, 1987 and CD, 1996)
- Artistry of Joan Benson, Early Music Institute, Barry Phillips; issued with Clavichord for Beginners, Indiana University Press, CD (2014)
- The Clavichord, Vision and Voice of Joan Benson, Early Music Institute; issued with Clavichord for Beginners, Indiana University Press, DVD (2014)

== Publications ==
=== Books ===
- Clavichord for Beginners, Indiana University Press, 2014

=== Articles in books ===
- "The Effect of Clavichord Technique on the Fortepiano", Internationaler Joseph Haydn Kongress, Wien, 1982, G. Henle Publishing House, Munich (1986)
- "The Clavichord in 20th-Century America", in Livro de Homenagem a Macario Santiago Kastner, Calouste Gulbenkian Foundation, Lisbon (1992)
- "Clavichord Technique in the Mid-Twentieth Century", Proceedings of the International Clavichord Symposium, Magnano, 9–11 September 1993, Istituto per I Beni Musicali in Piemonte, Turin (1994)
- "Clavichord Perspectives from Goethe to Pound", De Clavicordio VI, The International Centre for Clavichord Studies, Musica Antica a Magnano, Italy (2004)
- "Studying with Macario Santiago Kastner a Half-Century Ago", De Clavicordio VIII, The Clavichord on the Iberian Peninsula, The International Centre for Clavichord Studies, Musica Antica a Magnano, Italy (2008)
- "The Interplay of Clavichord and Piano", De Clavicordio XI, The International Centre for Clavichord Studies, Musica Antica a Magnano, Italy (2014)
- "Teaching the Clavichord in Our Electronic World", De Clavicordio XII, The International Centre for Clavichord Studies, Musica Antica a Magnano, Italy (2015), published 2017.

=== Articles in magazines ===
- "Recollections of Edwin Fischer" (T. Tikker), Journal of the American Liszt Society, vol. 21, January−June 1987.
- "Bach and the Clavier", Clavier Magazine, vol. 29, no. 2, February 1990.
- "Qigong for Pianists", Piano and Keyboard, no. 194, September–October 1998
- "Piano to Clavichord (1925–1962)", Clavichord International, Het Nederlands Clavichord Genootschap, vol. 10, no. 2, November 2006
- "An Interview with Joan Benson" Clavichord International, Het Nederlands Clavichord Genootschap, vol. 18, no. 2, November 2014
- "Getting Started: Clavichord", Early Music Today, Rhinegold Publishing, London, United Kingdom, (June–August 2017)
- "När fingret träffar tangenten", Tidig Music, Stockholm, Sweden, (October 2017)

=== Poems ===
- "Aged Woman Looking at a Man", Barren", "Antichrist 1986", Writers of Age, Nimrod International Journal of Prose and Poetry, Spring/Summer 1981
