= Carl Dieudonné =

German musical instrument maker (1783–1825)

- Born: November 30, 1783; Stuttgart
- Died: April 10, 1825 (aged 41)
- Occupation: Piano maker

Carl Dieudonné (30 November 1783 – 10 April 1825) was a co-founder of Dieudonné & Schiedmayer, a firm in Stuttgart that built pianos. He founded the firm together with Johann Lorenz Schiedmayer, and the Schiedmayer firm continued to build pianos well into the 20th century.

Dieudonné was born in Stuttgart, as the son of a principal court ballet dancer, and trained in Vienna with the piano builder Nannette Streicher. In Vienna, he is also assumed to have met Schiedmayer, whose cousin he later married. They founded the firm in 1806, and eventually became court suppliers ("Hoflieferant"). In 1824, shortly before his death, Schiedmayer and Dieudonné published a brief manual "on the proper use and knowledge concerning the playing, tuning, and maintenance of fortepianos, especially those made in the workshop of Dieudonné and Schiedmayer in Stuttgart". This book was reproduced in 1994 by the Gulde Verlag in Germany. Pianos built by Dieudonné and Schiedmayer are believed to be in museums in Stuttgart, Tübingen, Donaueschingen, Basel, Munich, Liège and other locations.
