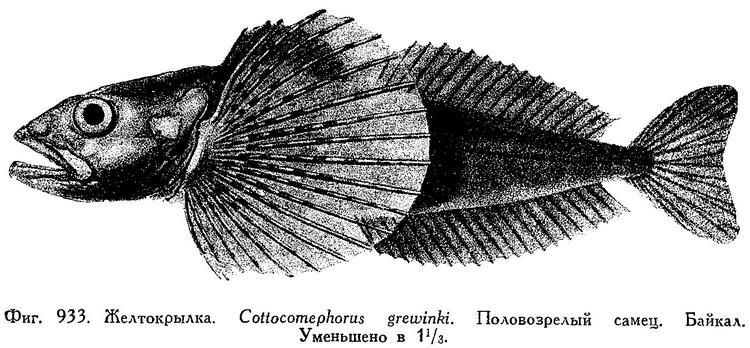
- Cottocomephorus grewingkii

Scientific classification
- Kingdom: Animalia
- Phylum: Chordata
- Class: Actinopterygii
- Division: Teleostei
- Order: Perciformes
- Suborder: Cottoidei
- Family: Cottidae
- Genus: Cottocomephorus; Pellegrin, 1900

Type species
- Cottocomephorus megalops Pellegrin, 1900

Synonyms
- Baicalocottus Berg, 1903

= Cottocomephorus =

Genus of fishes in lake Baikal

Cottocomephorus is a genus of freshwater ray-finned fishes belonging to the family Cottidae, the typical sculpins. This genus is endemic to Lake Baikal and its surrounding tributaries in Russia. They have relatively large pectoral fins and reach up to 22 cm (8.7 inches) in total length. They are an important food for the Baikal seal, during the winter second only to the golomyankas.

== Taxonomy ==
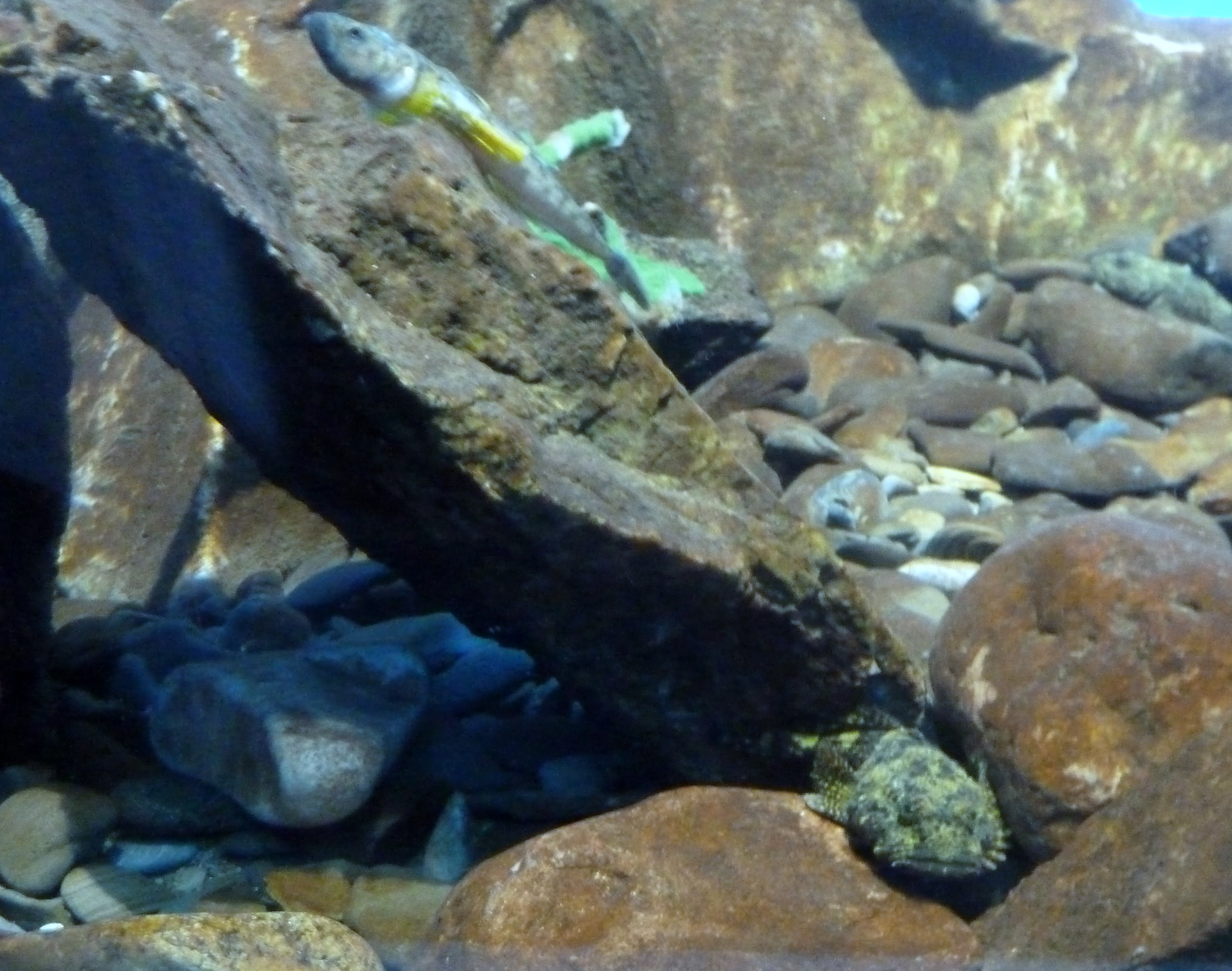
Fish above

Cottocomephorus was first proposed as a monospecific genus in 1900 by the French ichthyologist Jacques Pellegrin when he described Cottocomephorus megalops as a new species. The genus was classified in the family Cottocomephoridae; however, the 5th edition of Fishes of the World classifies the genus within the subfamily Cottinae of the family Cottidae, studies having found that the genera formerly included in the Cottocomephoridae were a clade arising from the genus Cottus.

== Species ==
There are currently four recognized species in this genus:

- Cottocomephorus alexandrae Taliev, 1935
- Cottocomephorus comephoroides (Berg, 1900)
- Cottocomephorus grewingkii (Dybowski, 1874) (Baikal yellowfin)
- Cottocomephorus inermis (Yakovlev, 1890) (Longfin Baikal sculpin)

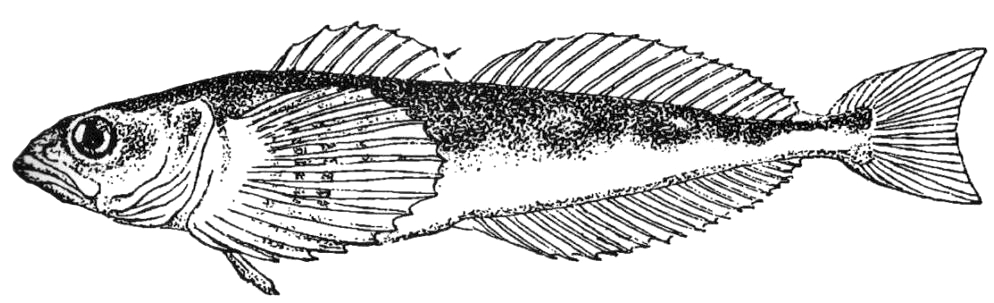
Cottocomephorus alexandrae

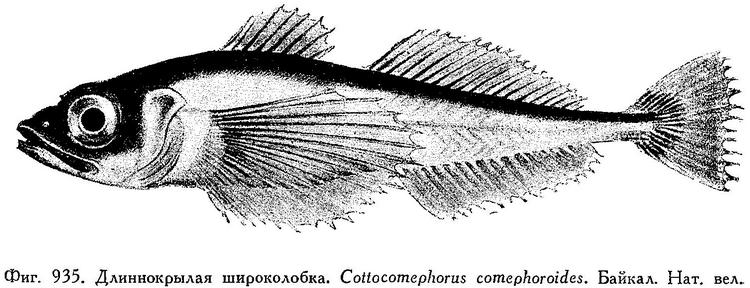
Cottocomephorus inermis
