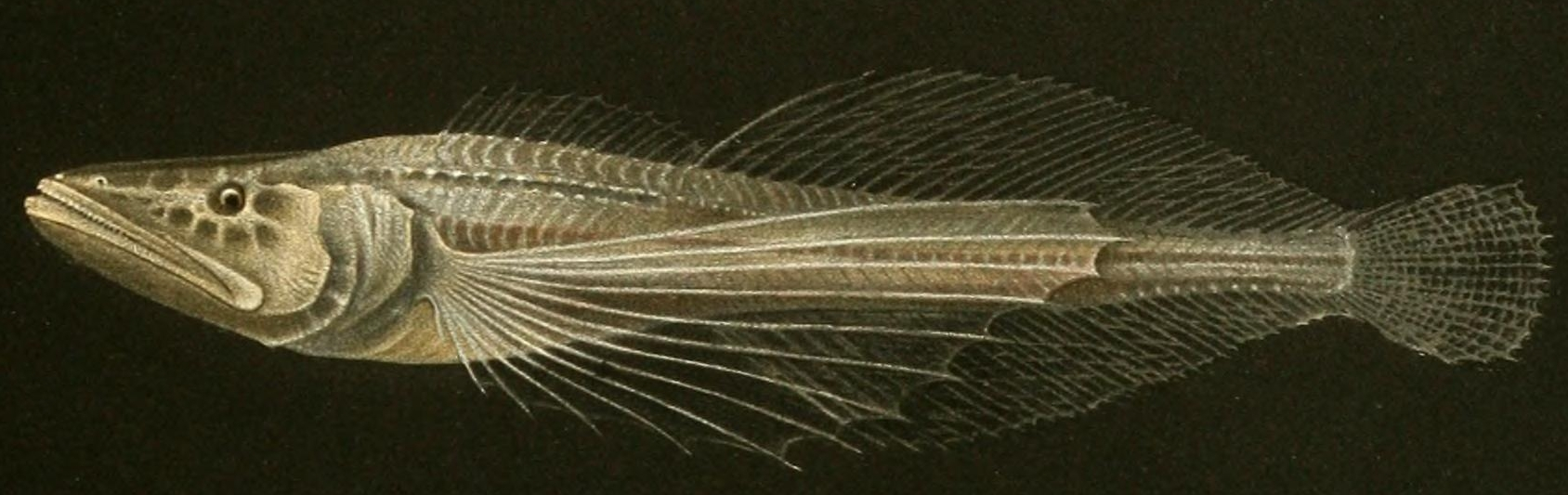

Conservation status
- Least Concern (IUCN 3.1)

Scientific classification
- Kingdom: Animalia
- Phylum: Chordata
- Class: Actinopterygii
- Order: Perciformes
- Suborder: Cottoidei
- Family: Cottidae
- Genus: Comephorus
- Species: C. dybowskii

Binomial name
- Comephorus dybowskii Korotneff, 1904

= Comephorus dybowskii =

Species of fish

Comephorus dybowskii, the little Baikal oilfish, is a species of freshwater ray-finned fish belonging to the family Cottidae, the typical sculpins. It is endemic to Lake Baikal in Russia.

== Etymology ==
The fish is named in honor of Polish biologist Benedykt Dybowski (1833-1930), who was known as the "learned professor who has studied this strange genus of fishes the most".
