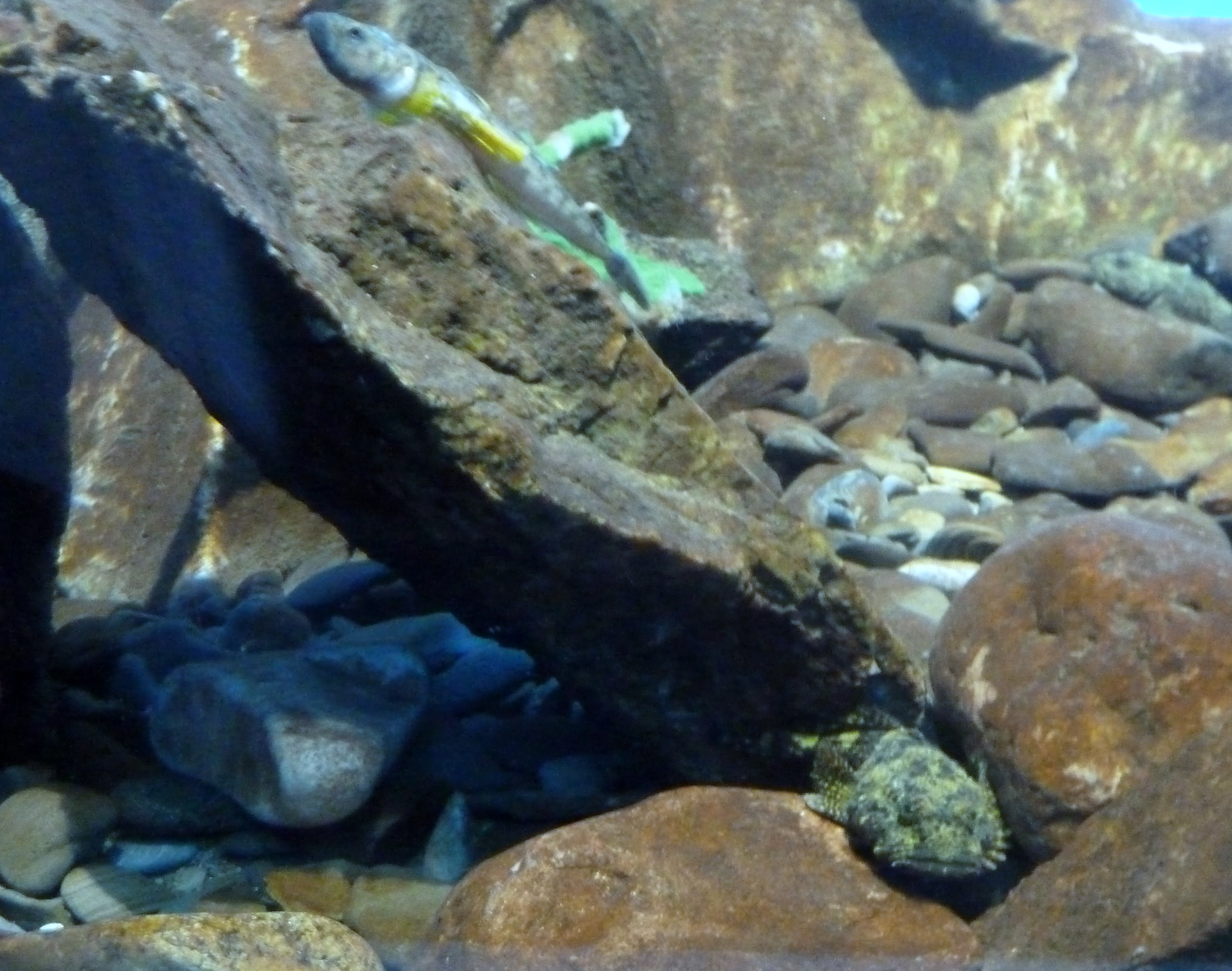
- Cottocomephorus grewingkii above

Conservation status
- Least Concern (IUCN 3.1)

Scientific classification
- Kingdom: Animalia
- Phylum: Chordata
- Class: Actinopterygii
- Order: Perciformes
- Suborder: Cottoidei
- Family: Cottidae
- Genus: Cottocomephorus
- Species: C. grewingkii

Binomial name
- Cottocomephorus grewingkii (Dybowski, 1874)

Synonyms
- Cottus grewingkii Dybowski, 1874; Baikalocottus grewingkii (Dybowski, 1874)

= Baikal yellowfin =

Species of fish

The Baikal yellowfin (Cottocomephorus grewingkii), also known as the yellow-finned sculpin or yellow-wing sculpin, is a species of freshwater ray-finned fish belonging to the family Cottidae, the typical sculpins. It is endemic to Lake Baikal and its tributaries in Siberia, Russia. It is most common in the southern part of the lake and lives from near the shore to a depth of 300 m (980 ft).

== Appearance ==
It can reach up to 19 cm (7.5 in) in total length, but most are 10–14 cm (3.9–5.5 in). They have relatively large pectoral fins, which are yellow in males. During the breeding season, the male's head becomes black when encountering other males.

== Behavior ==
The Baikal yellowfin feeds on copepods (notably Epischura baikalensis), amphipods, insect larvae and fish larvae. There are three separate breeding periods: March, May and August. There are some differences in the breeding behavior and site depending on when the fish breeds. Breeding occurs at a depth of 0.2 to 20 m (0.7–65.6 ft) in a crevice under a rock, which measures from 15 cm × 20 cm (6 in × 8 in) to 30 cm × 40 cm (12 in × 16 in). The distance between the rock's flat underside and the bottom is preferably 2.5–4 cm (1.0–1.6 in). The female lays 389 to 3136 eggs on the underside of the rock (upperside of the crevice), which are guarded by the male and if he disappears, the eggs usually perish. The eggs hatch after 15–20 days at a water temperature of 10–11 °C (50–52 °F), and 20–24 days at 5–8 °C (41–46 °F). After hatching, the fish larvae initially survive off their yolk sac and then start feeding on copepods. The Baikal yellowfin can reach an age of up to six years and reach sexual maturity when two or three.

== Status and threats ==
Young Baikal yellowfins are important food for other fish such as the omul. Until the 1950s and 60s, the Baikal yellowfin was fished in large numbers, but it declined and is not commercially fished anymore. A prime reason for the decline was the Irkutsk Hydroelectric Power Station, which caused siltation of the breeding grounds. Another threat are algal mats (Spirogyra and Ulothrix), which during blooms may cover their breeding grounds.
