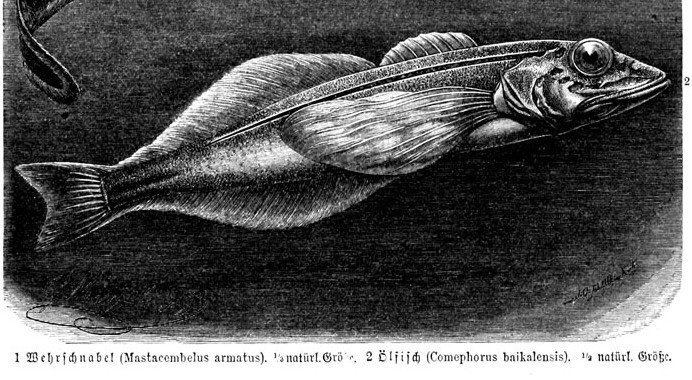

Conservation status
- Least Concern (IUCN 3.1)

Scientific classification
- Kingdom: Animalia
- Phylum: Chordata
- Class: Actinopterygii
- Order: Perciformes
- Suborder: Cottoidei
- Family: Cottidae
- Genus: Comephorus
- Species: C. baikalensis

Binomial name
- Comephorus baikalensis (Pallas, 1776)

Synonyms
- Callionymus baikalensis Pallas, 1776

= Comephorus baikalensis =

Species of fish

Comephorus baikalensis, the big Baikal oilfish, is a species of freshwater ray-finned fish belonging to the Family (taxonomy) Cottidae, the typical sculpins. It is endemic to Lake Baikal in Russia.
