= Sasnava Eldership =

Eldership of Lithuania

The Sasnava Eldership (Lithuanian: Sasnavos seniūnija) is an eldership of Lithuania, located in the Marijampolė Municipality. In 2021 its population was 2925.
