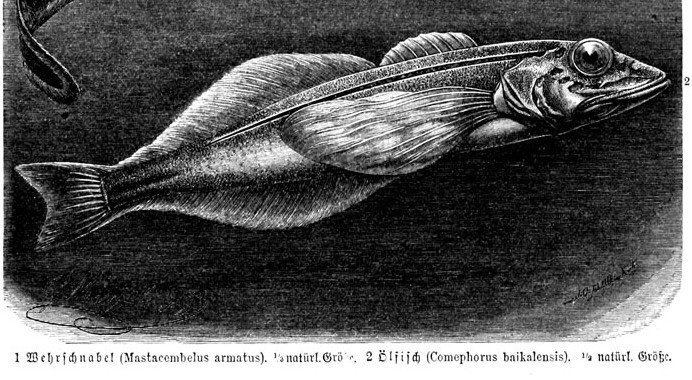

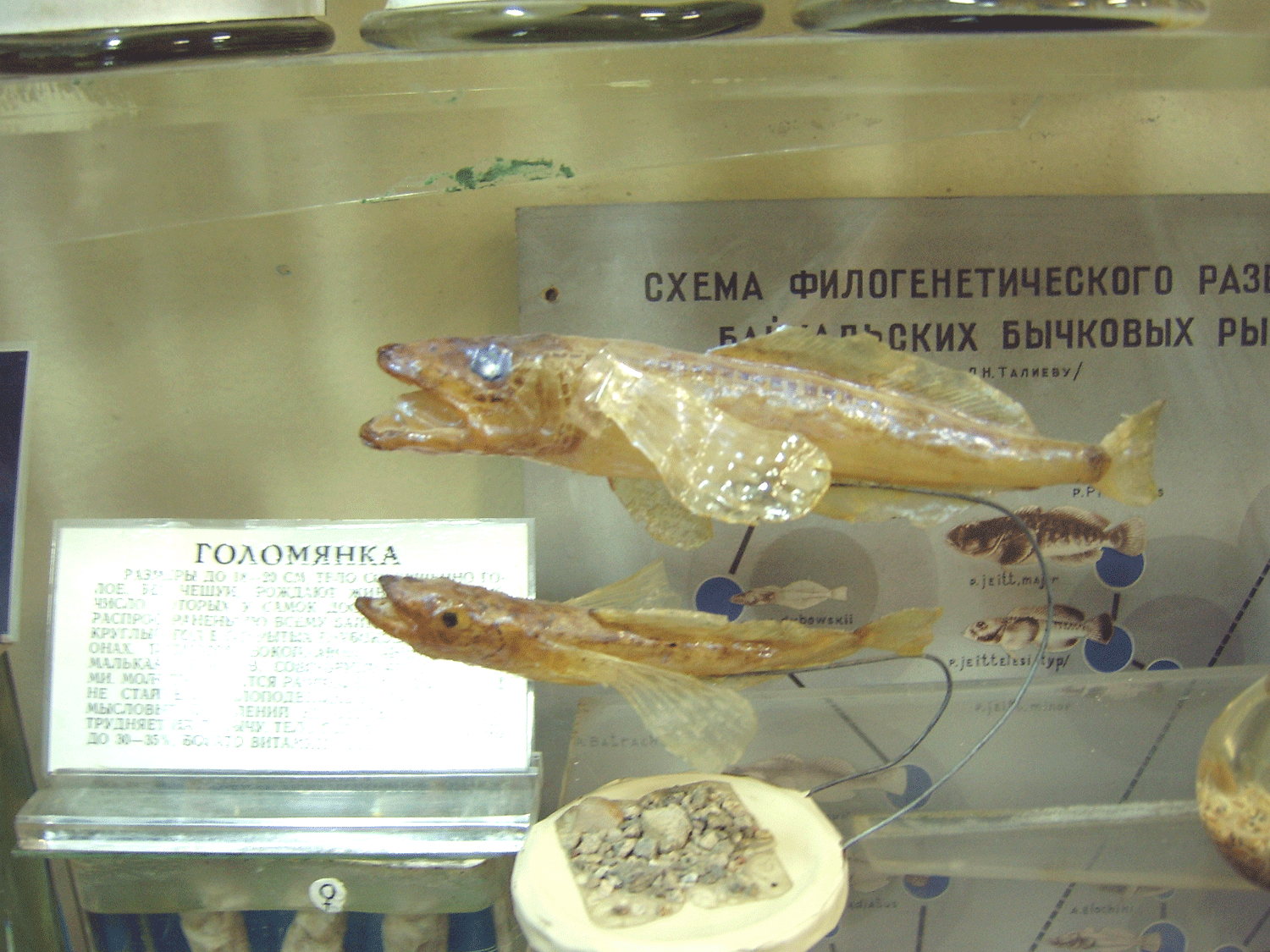

Scientific classification
- Kingdom: Animalia
- Phylum: Chordata
- Class: Actinopterygii
- Division: Teleostei
- Order: Perciformes
- Suborder: Cottoidei
- Superfamily: Cottoidea
- Family: Cottidae; Günther, 1861
- Genus: Comephorus; Lacépède, 1800

Type species
- Comephorus baikalensis Pallas, 1776

= Comephorus =

Genus of fishes

Comephorus, known as the golomyankas or Baikal oilfish, are a genus comprising two species of peculiar sculpin fishes endemic to Lake Baikal in Russia. Comephorus is the only genus in the subfamily Comephorinae. Golomyankas are pelagic fishes and the main food source for the Baikal seal.

== Taxonomy ==
Comephorus was first proposed as a monospecific genus in 1800 by the French naturalist and politician Bernard Germain de Lacépède with Callionymus baikalensis as its only species. The 5th edition of Fishes of the World places this genus in the monotypic subfamily Comephorinae within the family Cottidae, the typical sculpins. Other authorities have used phylogenetic studies which have found that Baikal sculpins that were classified in the subfamilies Comephorinae and Abyssocottinae by Fishes of the World radiated from an ancestor which was likely to be within the genus Cottus and that the classification of the Baikal sculpins in a different taxon from Cottus was paraphyletic.

== Description ==
Comephorus have translucent bodies with no scales, but appear dull when dead. The big Baikal oilfish (C. baikalensis) can reach up to 21 cm (8.3 in) in length and the little Baikal oilfish (C. dybowskii) up to 16 cm (6.3 in). Males are smaller than females, only reaching about 2/3 the length. They have long pectoral fins, and although pelvic bones are present, they lack pelvic fins. They have a strong lateral line. The lateral line system on the head consists of large cavities linked by narrow, bony bridges with small external pores. High lipid content and porous bones result in an almost neutral buoyancy and lack of swim bladder allows the fish to tolerate varying pressure extremes as they move through the water column. Over a third of the body weight (38.9%) of C. baikalensis is oil, but C. dybowskii contains far less (4.7%). It has been said that they decompose in sunlight, leaving behind only fatty oil and bones, although the accuracy of this claim has been questioned. Unusually, their eyes only contain rod cells (not cone cells), indicating a high sensitivity to light. Some of the adaptions in golomyankas resemble those seen in deep sea fish.

== Species ==
There are currently two recognized species in this genus:

- Comephorus baikalensis (Pallas, 1776) (big Baikal oilfish)
- Comephorus dybowskii Korotneff, 1904 (little Baikal oilfish)

== Biology and ecology ==
The common name golomyanka originates from the old-Russian golomen, meaning "far from the shore" in the local dialect and referring to their pelagic behavior. They are the principal ecological competitor to the omul, which also eat small golomyankas, and represent a primary food source for the Baikal seal, at more than 90% of its diet. They are easily identifiable, and are large enough to be easily seen. Golomyankas are unusual for occurring pelagically throughout the entire water column of Lake Baikal, ranging from depths of around 1.6 km (1.0 mi) to near the surface, but they primarily occur deeper than 100 m (330 ft). During the night they move up the water column to feed, often occurring as shallow as 10–25 m (33–82 ft), and in the winter they can occasionally be seen swimming just below the ice-covered surface. They are considered the world's most abyssal freshwater fish, together with certain Lake Baikal deep-water sculpins (Abyssocottidae). They move without much regard for changes in pressure, although they can exist only in cold temperatures, preferring water that is no more than 5 °C (41 °F) and dying at 10 °C (50 °F).

The biomass of the golomyanka population is estimated at about 150 thousand tons, making it the most populous fish in Lake Baikal. It is estimated that about 70% of the fish in the lake are golomyankas. Their juveniles are also the most abundant pelagic fish larvae in the lake. Large shoals are not known for this species, although groups of up to about 20 individuals have been recorded near the lake bottom. Females are more common than males, which only make up about 32% of the population in the little Baikal oilfish and 17% in the big Baikal oilfish. The females do not lay eggs; rather, they are viviparous, giving birth to a swarm of 2000–3000 larvae. Females containing developing embryos can be seen year-round, but there does appear to be a level of seasonality in the birth, with the largest number of larvae occurring from August to April (some differences in the peak timing between the two species). Most females die after giving birth. It has been claimed that their bellies burst open to release the young, killing the female in the process, but this is a myth. Golomyanka can reach an age of up to 6–8 years.

They are sluggish fish, and have relatively large mouths with several rows of somewhat brush-like teeth, allowing them to sift out fine organisms from the water. They primarily feed on the planktonic copepod Epischura baikalensis, the amphipod crustacean Macrohectopus branickii and larvae of sculpins, including those of their own species.

== Relationship to humans ==
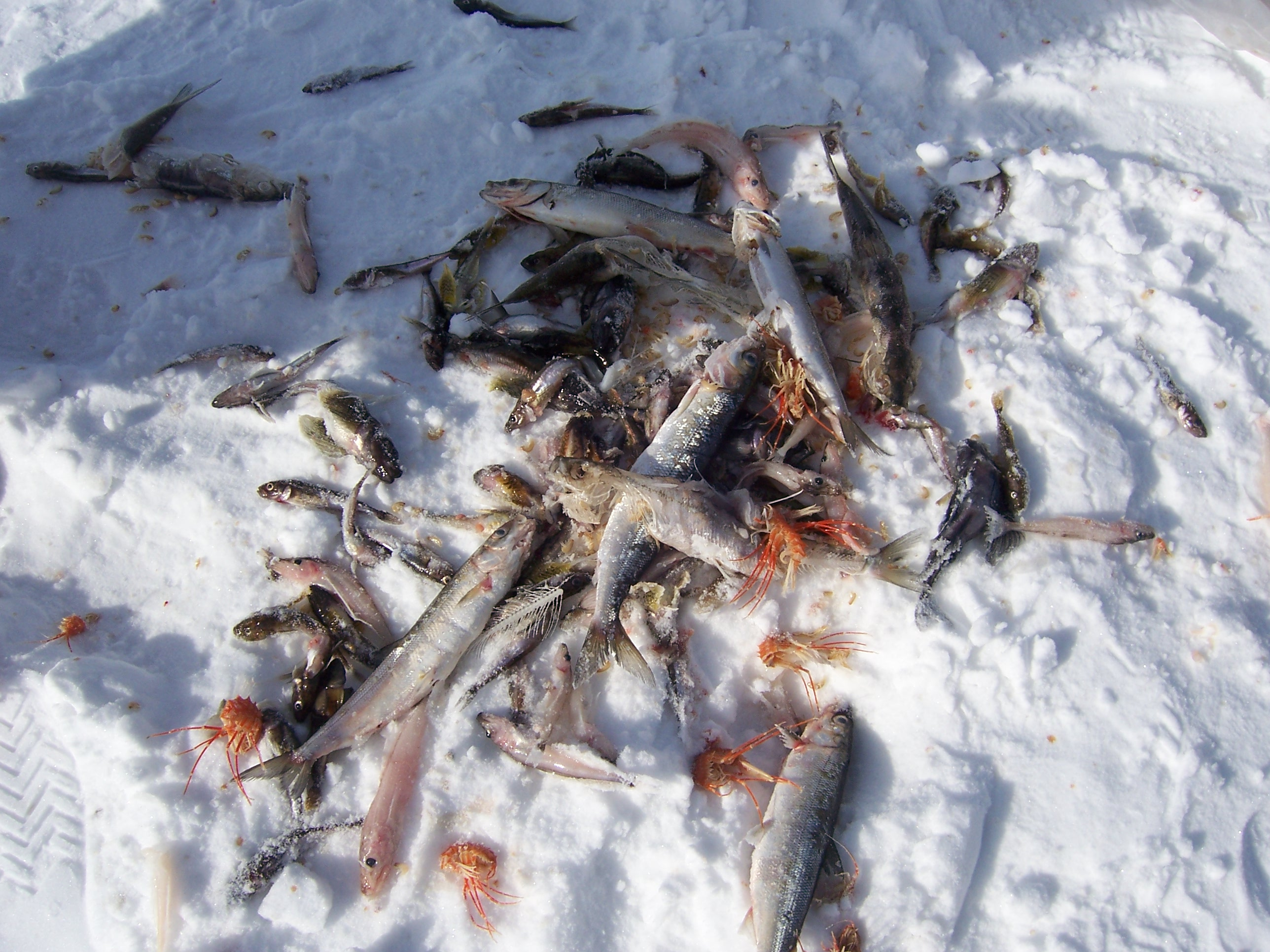
A few golomyankas (for example, the pinkish fish on the upper-center part of the photo and another in the lower-left), as well as several whitefish, Baikal yellowfins and amphipods caught during icefishing using a net

Despite being numerous in the lake, golomyankas are difficult to catch in large quantities as they do not gather in large schools. Golomyankas are not harvested commercially, although their fats and oils were used in lamps and as traditional medicine by native Siberians when storms tossed the fish up on shore. They are of no value as a food source for humans, dogs or cats, but are the primary food source for the Baikal seal, and also eaten by other fish in the lake. They are so numerous and spawn so rapidly that they represent the largest concentration of fish biomass within the entire lake, and would seriously unbalance the ecosystem of Lake Baikal if not constantly preyed upon by predators.

== See also ==
- List of fish families
