= Schiedmayer =

German instrument-manufacturing family

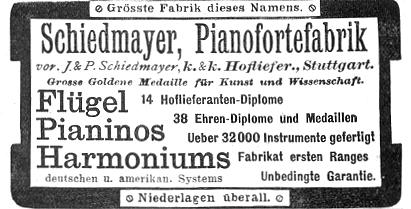
Advertisement of J. & P. Schiedmayer (c. 1900)

Schiedmayer is the name of a German Instrument-manufacturing family. Established in 1735 as a keyboard instrument manufacturer, it is still active today as a family business.

== History ==
=== Beginnings ===
The first instrument maker in the family was Balthasar Schiedmayer (1711-1781), an organ and piano maker in Erlangen, who built his first instrument in 1735. Three of his sons also learned the art of piano making:

- Johann Georg Christoph Schiedmayer (1740-1820) settled in Neustadt an der Aisch. A number of his instruments have survived. His son Johann Erhard Schiedmayer was a piano maker as well.
- Adam Achatius Schiedmayer (1745-1817) was a piano maker in Erlangen. A grand piano of his has survived.
- Johann David Schiedmayer (1753-1805) was active in Erlangen, and after 1797 in Nuremberg. He was one of the best-known piano makers of his time. From his workshop, a clavichord, five fortepianos and a square piano have survived

=== Schiedmayer & Sons ===
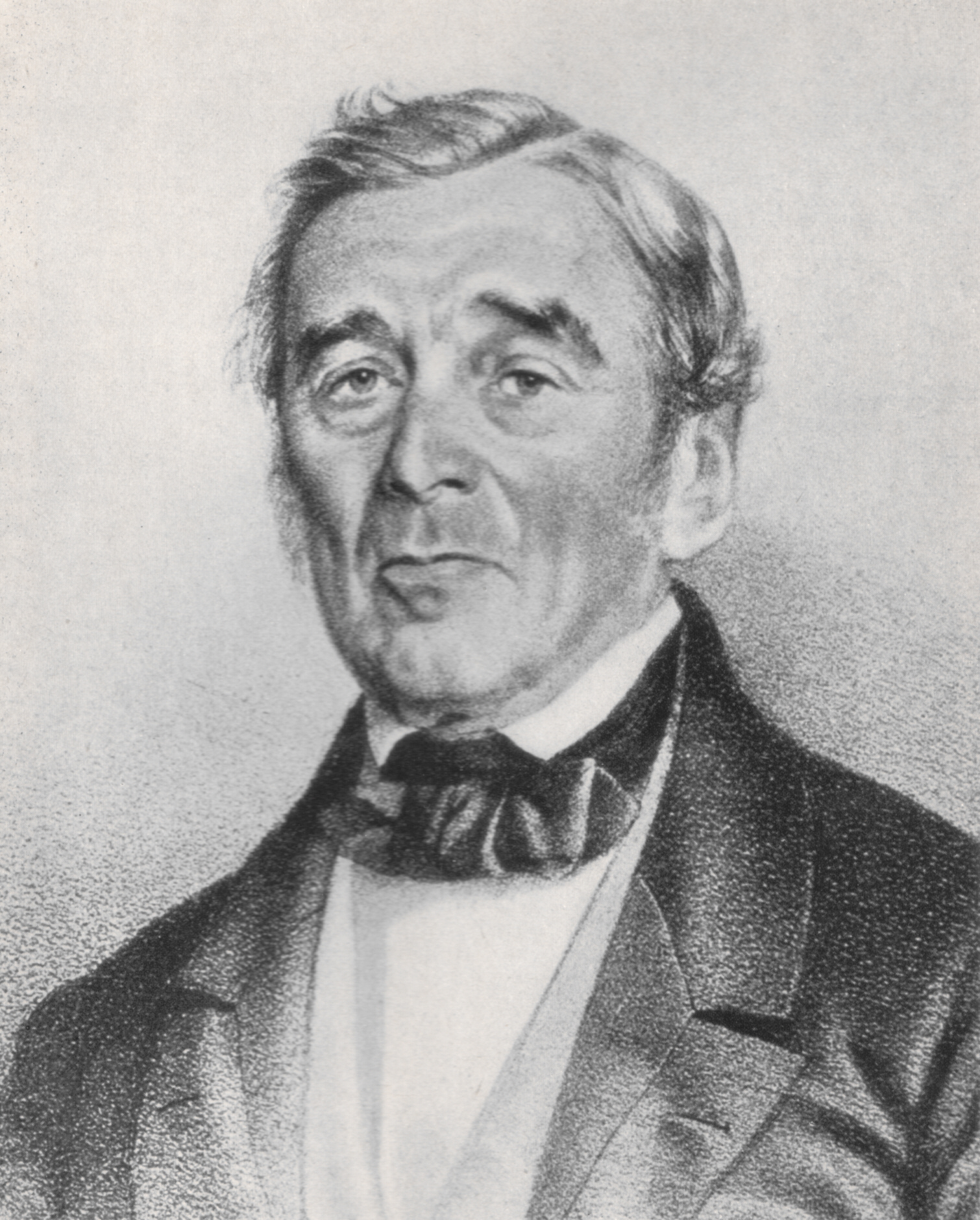
Johann Lorenz Schiedmayer

In 1809, Johann David's son Johann Lorenz Schiedmayer (1786-1860), together with Carl Dieudonné, founded the firm of Dieudonné & Schiedmayer in Stuttgart. The firm soon became well known in the area. When the composer Friedrich Silcher moved to Stuttgart, he lived for two years in Schiedmayer's home. After the death of Dieudonné, the workshop was renamed Pianofortefabrik von Schiedmayer, and after 1845, when Adolf and Hermann Schiedmayer, the older sons of Johann Lorenz Schiedmayer, joined the firm, Schiedmayer & Sons, Pianoforte Factory. From 1821 to 1969 the factory was on what was then Neckerstrasse 14-16 and is now Konrad Adenauer Strasse in Stuttgart. This lot is occupied today by the State University of Music and Performing Arts and Representative Arts and by the House of History (Haus der Geschichte Baden-Württemberg).

In 1909, a major exhibit to commemorate the centenary of the firm was held in Stuttgart at the Royal Center for Industry and Trade (Today House of Commerce). Among the visitors were Württemberg’s King William II and his wife Charlotte.

=== J & P Schiedmayer ===
Johann Lorenz Schiedmayer sent his two younger sons Julius and Paul to Paris, where they studied harmonium construction, and also met Victor Mustel, who some years later invented the celesta. After returning to Stuttgart, they founded in 1853 the firm of J & P Schiedmayer, which soon started building pianos and later celestas. They also built unusual instruments, like the Schiedmayer-Scheola (a mixture of organ, harmonium and celesta) and some mechanical autoplay instruments.

The firm was located near Schiedmayer & Sons. The firm later changed its name to Schiedmayer Pianoforte Factory.

In 1969, the owner of Schiedmayer & Sons, Georg Schiedmayer, took over the Schiedmayer Piano Factory, previously J & P Schiedmayer, from their then owners, Max and Hans Schiedmayer. Piano production was terminated in 1980, and the firm specialized on the manufacture of celestas and glockenspiels. In 1992, upon the death of Georg Schiedmayer, his widow, Elianne Schiedmayer, inherited the firm of Schiedmayer & Sons GmbH & Co. KG as well as Schiedmayer Pianoforte Factory, previously known as J & P Schiedmayer. In 2008 the firm of Schiedmayer Pianoforte Factory was officially liquidated at the Registry of Companies.

=== Schiedmayer Celesta GmbH ===
In 1995 Elianne Schiedmayer launched Schiedmayer Celesta GmbH, (formerly Schiedmayer Celestabau GmbH), located since 2000 in Wendlingen am Neckar near Stuttgart. Worldwide, Schiedmayer celestas and keyboard Glockenspiel are used, among others, in operas and concert halls.

=== Müller–Schiedmayer ===
The Müller-Schiedmayer factory was founded in 1874 in Würzburg by the son of a daughter of Johann Lorenz Schiedmayer; he learned his trade at J & P Schiedmayer and Schiedmayer & Sons, as well as at Steinway & Sons in New York City. The business was liquidated in 1968. The last bearer of the name was Erwin Müller-Schiedmayer.

== Instruments ==
=== In production ===
==== Schiedmayer Celesta GmbH ====
- Celesta 5 1/2 octaves – Studio model
- Celesta 5 1/2 octaves – Compact model
- Celesta 5 octaves
- Built-in celesta for church organs

=== Historical Instruments ===
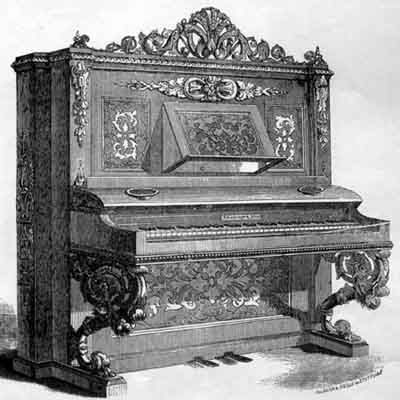
A piano of Schiedmayer & Sons, exhibited at the London World Expo of 1851

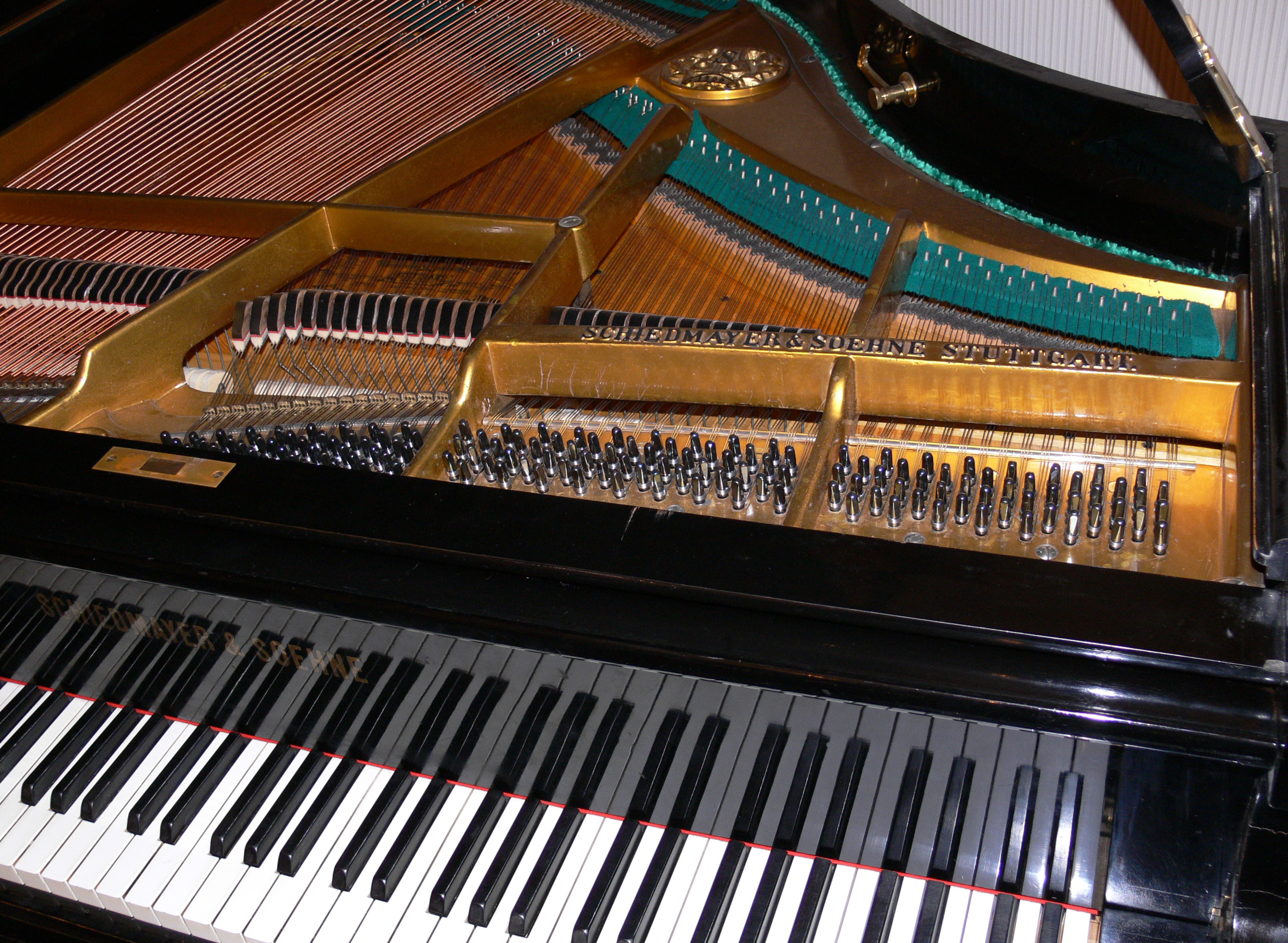
Grand piano, Schiedmayer & Sons, Model 20, 1926-1930

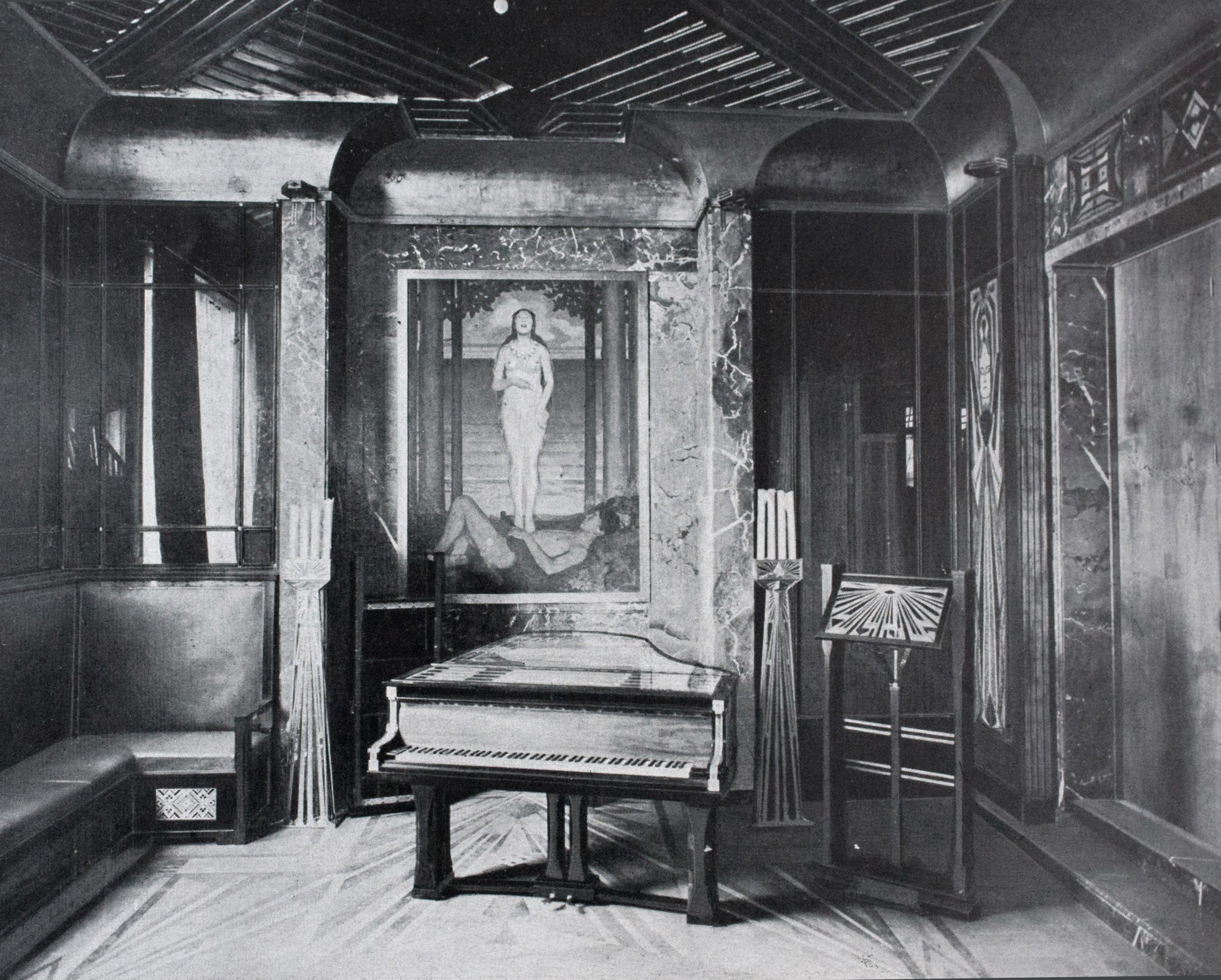
Music room in the Bahrens house in Darmstadt, grand piano of Schiedmayer Pianoforte Factory Stuttgart, completed in 1901

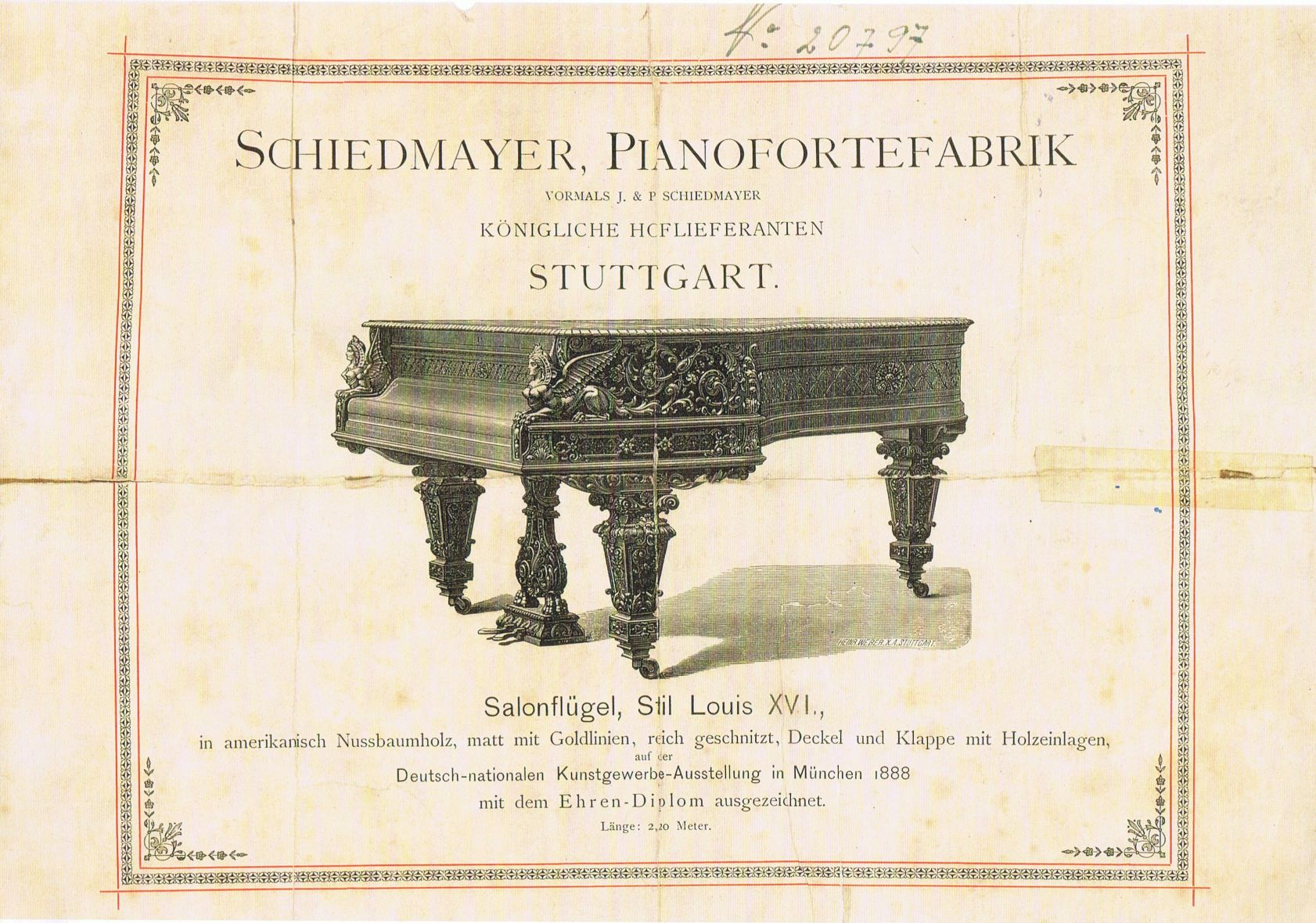
Promotion of the Salon Grand Piano, style Louis XVI, of the Schiedmayer Pianoforte Factory

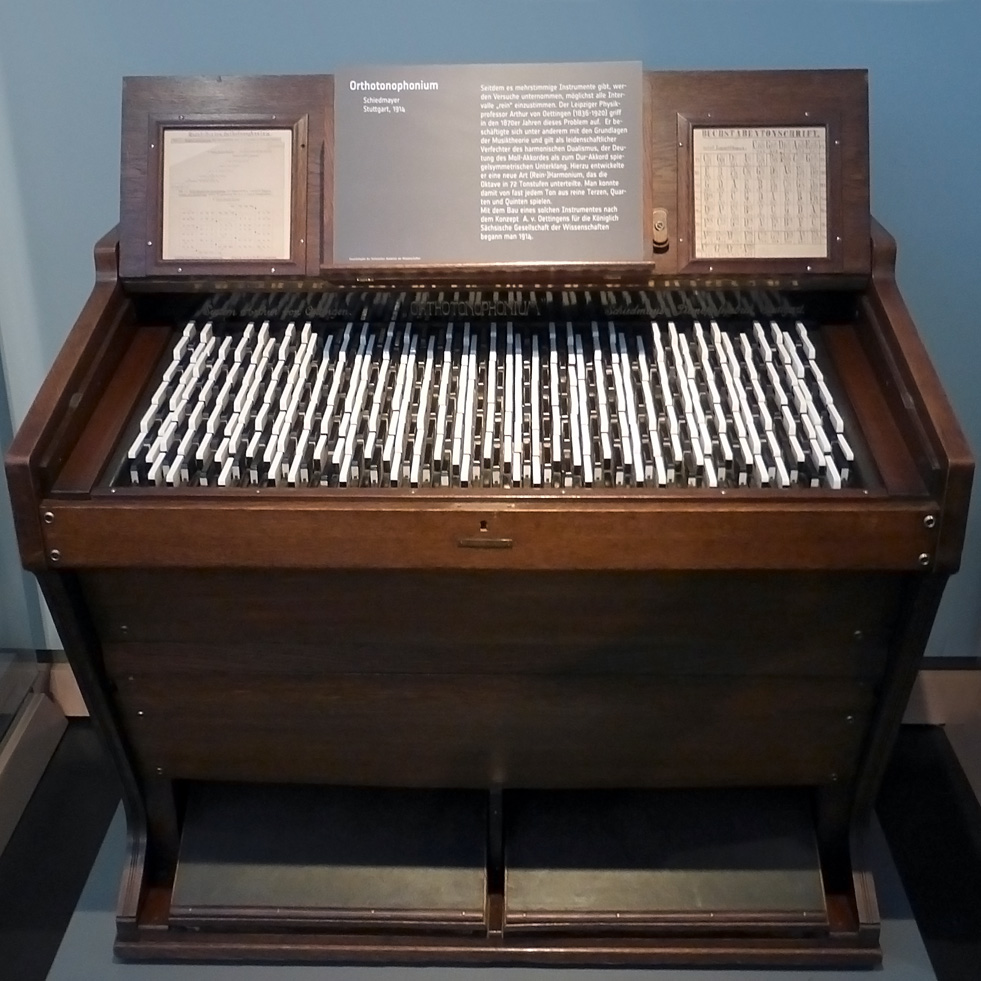
Orthotonophonium with 72 microtones per octave

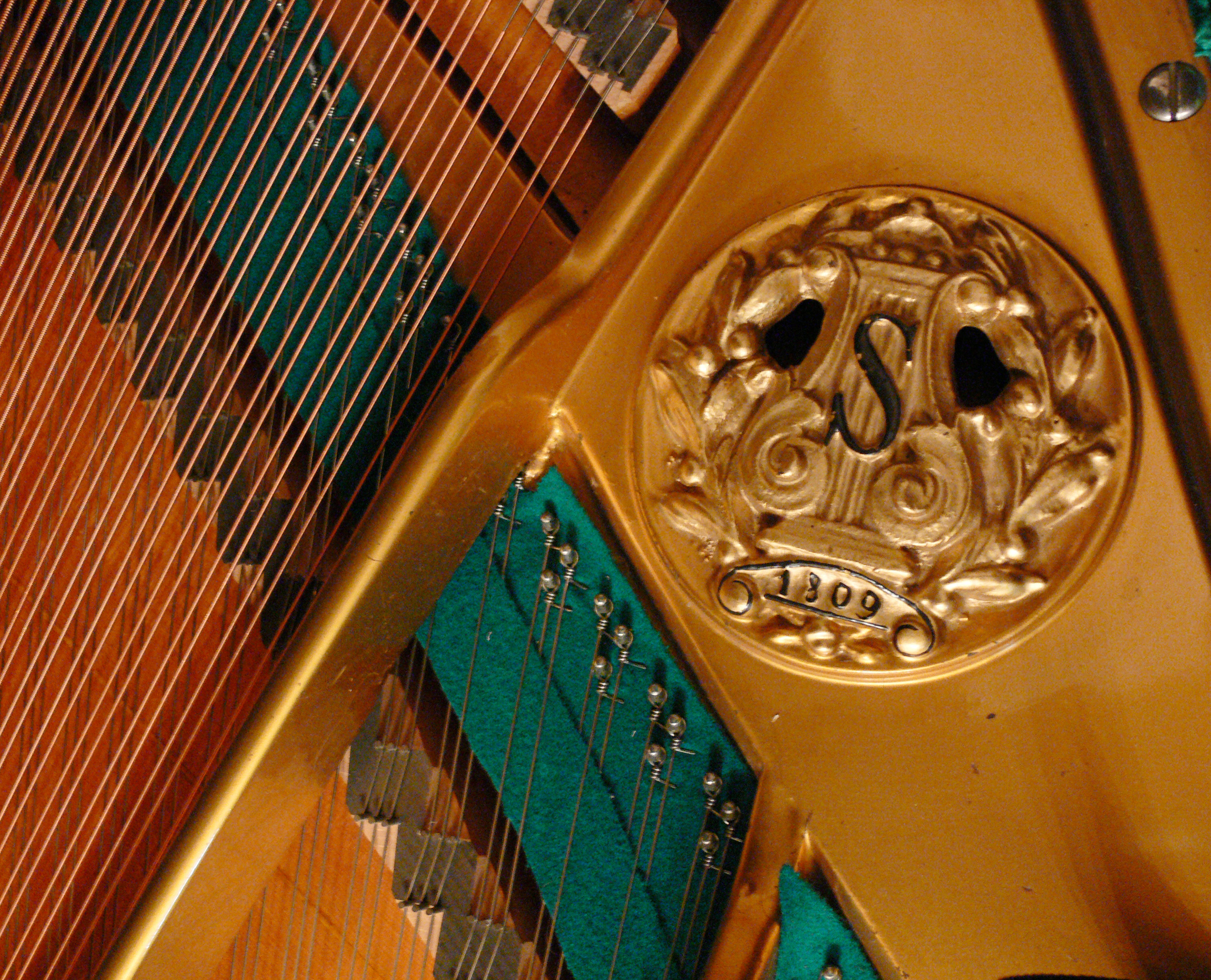
Signet of the firm of Schiedmayer & Sons on the cast plate of a grand piano
