= Daukšiai (Marijampolė County) =

- Town
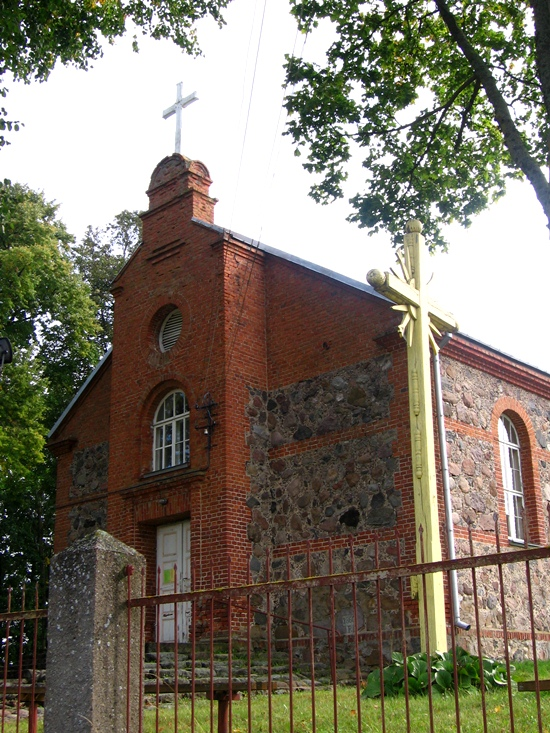
- St. George's Church

- Location within Lithuania
- Coordinates: 54°30′0″N 23°35′0″E
- Country: Lithuania
- Ethnographic region: Suvalkija
- County: Marijampolė County
- Municipality: Marijampolė municipality
- Elderate: Igliauka elderate

Population (2011)
  - Total: 275
- Time zone: UTC+2 (EET)
  - Summer (DST): UTC+3 (EEST)

Daukšiai is a town in Marijampolė municipality, Lithuania. According to the 2011 census, the town has a population of 275 people.
