= Hyperiopsidae =

Scientific classification
- Kingdom: Animalia
- Phylum: Arthropoda
- Clade: Pancrustacea
- Class: Malacostraca
- Order: Amphipoda
- Parvorder: Hyperiopsidira
- Superfamily: Hyperiopsoidea
- Family: Hyperiopsidae; Bovallius, 1886

Genera
- Hyperiopsis Sars, 1885; Parargissa Chevreux, 1908

Family of crustaceans

Hyperiopsidae is a family of amphipods, comprising the genera Hyperiopsis and Parargissa.
