= Vitjazianidae =

Scientific classification
- Domain: Eukaryota
- Kingdom: Animalia
- Phylum: Arthropoda
- Class: Malacostraca
- Order: Amphipoda
- Superfamily: Hyperiopsoidea
- Family: Vitjazianidae

Family of crustaceans

Vitjazianidae is a family of crustaceans belonging to the order Amphipoda.

Genera:

- Vemana Barnard, 1964
- Vitjaziana Birstein and Vinogradov, 1955
