= Alexandre Debain =

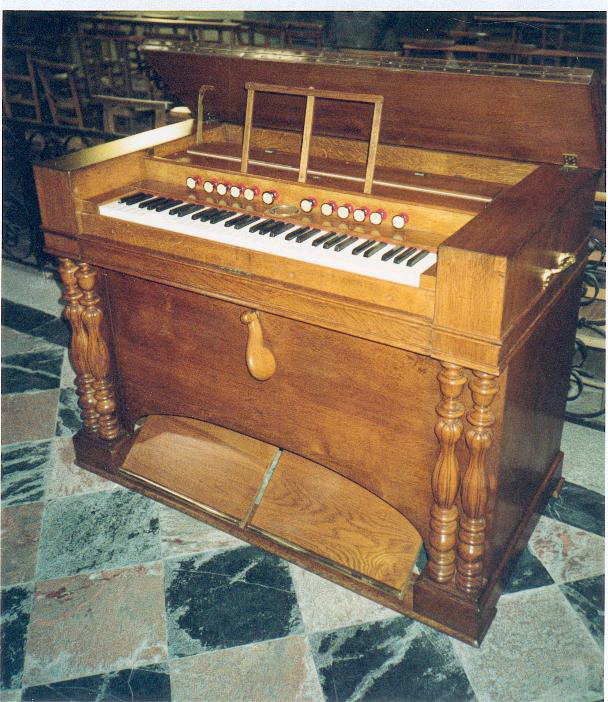
Harmonium Debain

Alexandre-François Debain (6 July 1809 – 3 December 1877) was a French inventor who developed the harmonium. He made a new action system, in which, when depressing a note on the keyboard, a valve opened thereby emitting sound from the instrument. He patented it in Paris in 1842.
