= Igliauka =

- Village
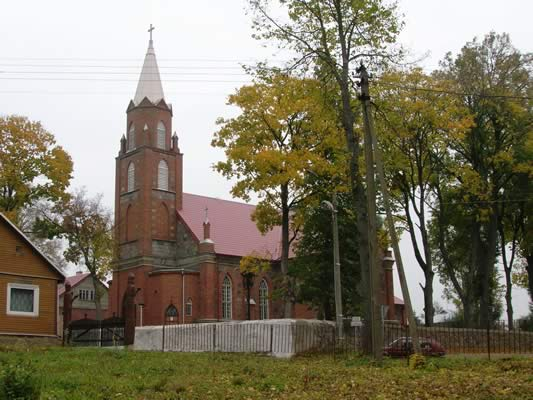

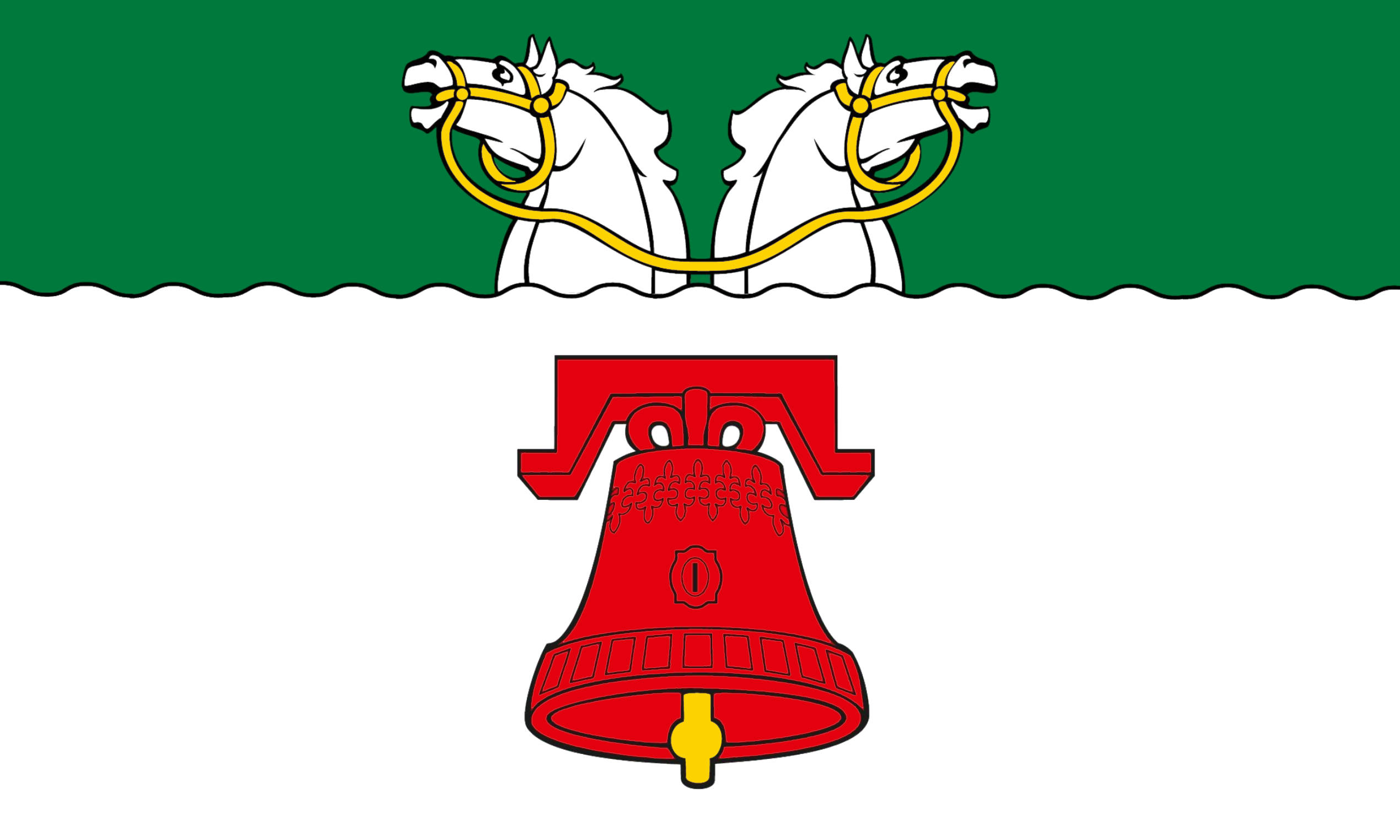
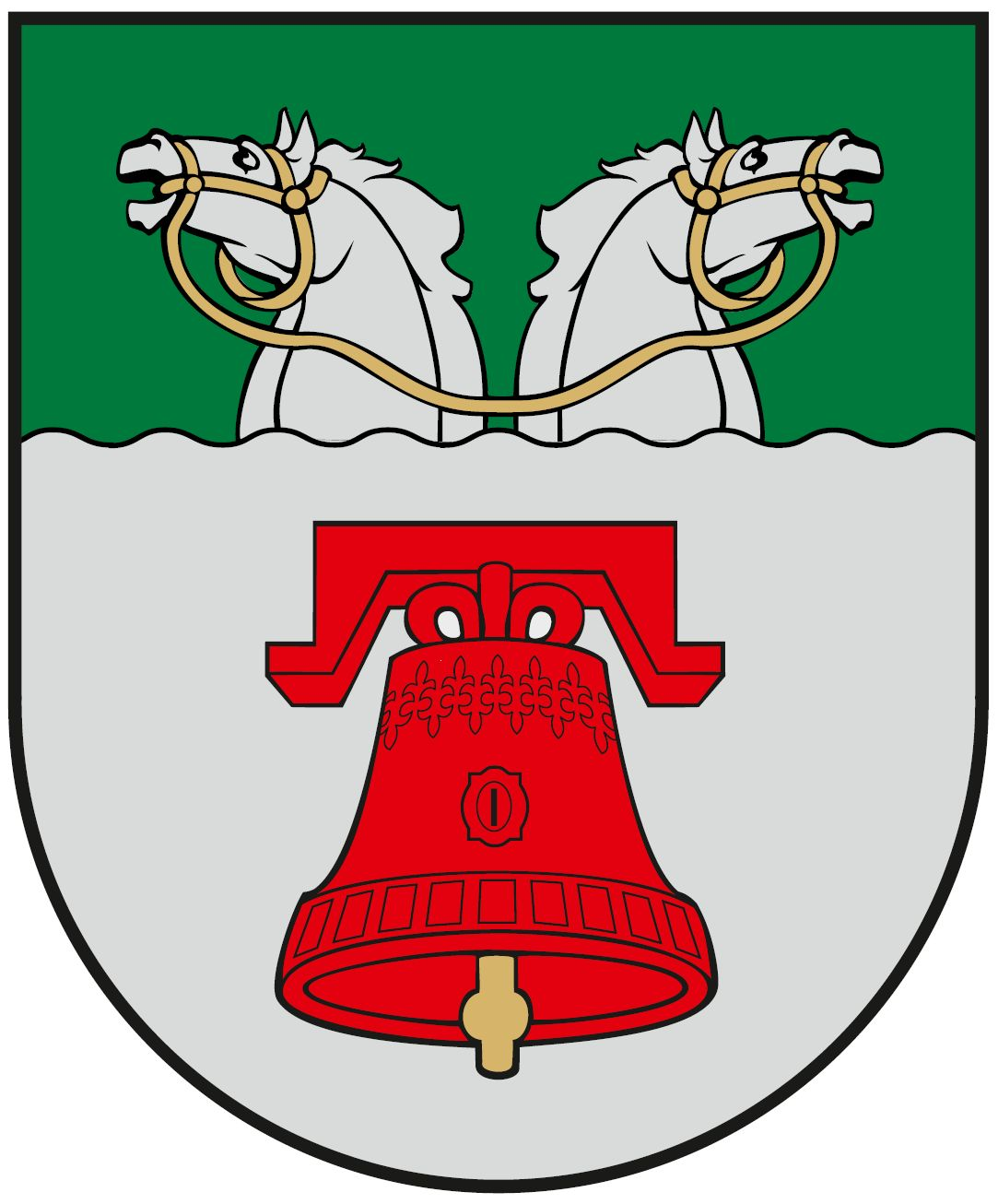
- Flag Coat of arms

- Location within Lithuania
- Coordinates: 54°34′19″N 23°39′11″E
- Country: Lithuania
- County: Marijampolė County

Population (2021)
  - Total: 774
- Time zone: UTC+2 (EET)
  - Summer (DST): UTC+3 (EEST)

Igliauka is a village in Marijampolė municipality, Lithuania.

The village has a library, a post office (ZIP code: 69005).

== Name origins ==
Ilgiliauka village stands near a lake Ygla. There is a stream Yglė flowing from the lake through the village. Igliauka village got the name from the lake and earlier its inhabitants were calling it Ygliai village.
