= Benedykt Dybowski =

Polish naturalist and physician

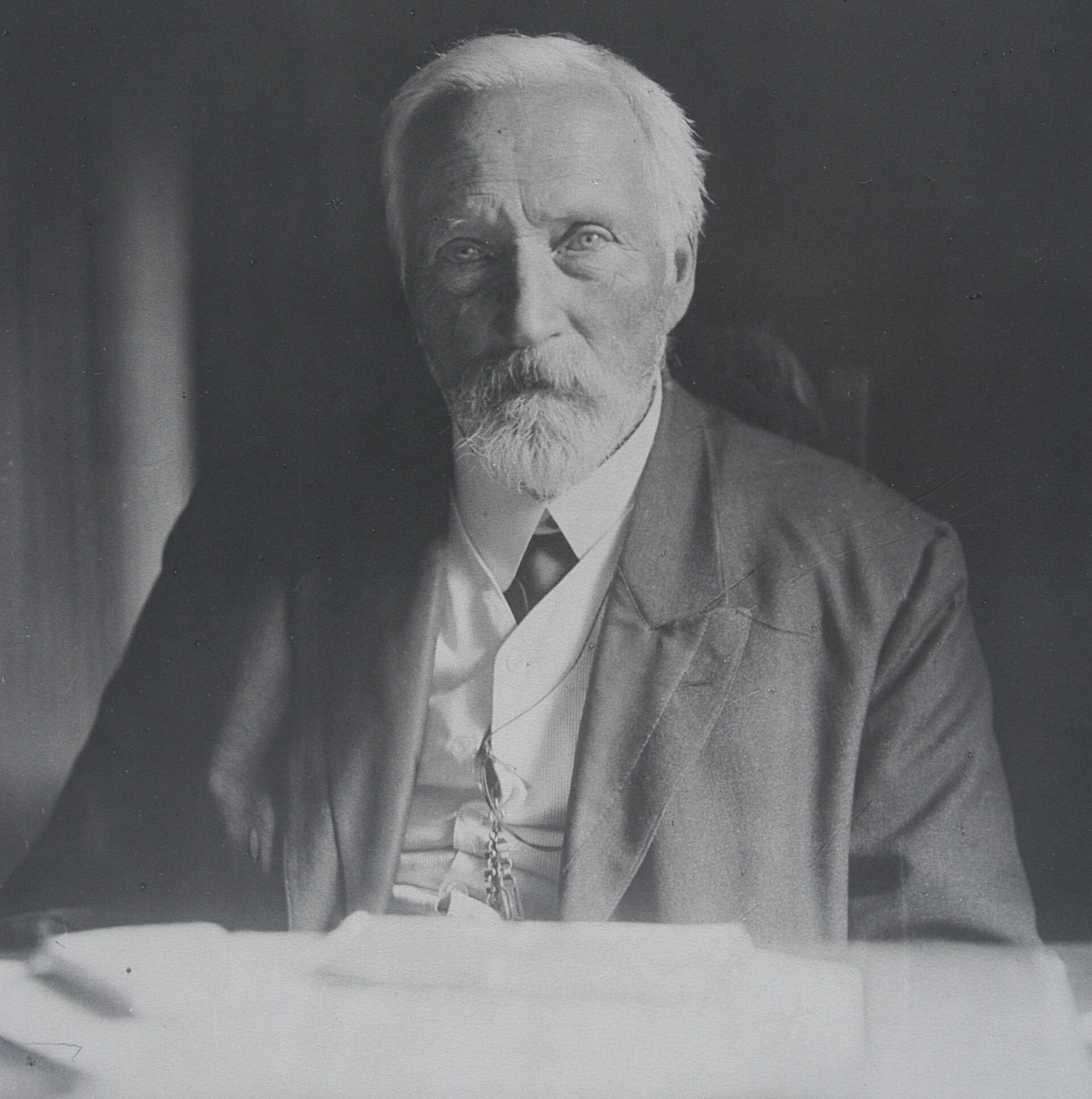
- Born: 12 May 1833; Adamarini, Russian Empire
- Died: 31 January 1930 (aged 96); Lwów, Republic of Poland
- Education: Friedrich Wilhelm University in Berlin
- Known for: Discovery and classification of wide range of new Lake Baikal animals
- Scientific career
- Fields: Limnology, zoology
- Workplaces: University of Lwów (Lemberg)
- Thesis: Commentationis de parthenogenesi specimen
- Doctoral advisor: C.B. Reichert

Benedykt Tadeusz Dybowski (12 May 1833 – 31 January 1930) was a Polish naturalist and physician.

== Life ==
Benedykt Dybowski was born in Adamaryni, within the Minsk Governorate of the Russian Empire to Polish nobility. He was the brother of naturalist Władysław Dybowski and the cousin of the French explorer Jean Dybowski.

He studied at Minsk High School, and later medicine at Tartu (earlier Dorpat) University in present-day Estonia. He later studied at Wroclaw University and went on expeditions to seek and study oceanic fishes and crustaceans. He became a professor of zoology at the Warsaw Main School.

In 1864 he was arrested and condemned to death for taking part in the Polish January Uprising. His sentence was later reduced to 12 years in Siberia.

He started studying the natural history of Siberia and in 1866 a governor Muraviov dismissed Dybowski from hard labour (katorga), renewed his civil rights and proposed him to work as a doctor in hospital.

He later settled in the small village Kultuk and began a detailed study of Baikal Lake with some technical support from the Russian Geographical Society. He served as a medical doctor for the indigenous population of Kamchatka, the Aleutian Islands, the Commander Islands, Bering Island, making four trips per year around the populated areas there.

After returning from Asia he continued research work at Lwów University (Lemberg). He was a president of the Polish Copernicus Society of Naturalists (1886–87).

In 1927 the Academy of Sciences of the Soviet Union elected Dybowski as a member-correspondent. Apart from that in 1921 Dybowski was given an honorary doctorate by the Warsaw's University, and in 1923 by the University of Wilno. On Dybowski's 95th birthday he was congratulated by the Shevchenko Scientific Society.

Dybowski spent the last years of his life in Lwów. Dybowski died at the age of 96. He is buried in Lwów (present-day Lviv) on the Łyczakowski Cemetery among the participants of the Polish Uprising of 1863.

Most of his collection of zoological and botanical specimens is now in the Lwów Zoological museum.

An amphipod (Gammaracanthuskytodermogammarus loricatobaicalensis), supposedly from Lake Baikal and named by him was once considered the longest scientific name. However, that name is no longer considered valid.

In February 2014, traveller Jacek Pałkiewicz unveiled a memorial plaque to Dybowski in Petropavlovsk-Kamchatski.

== Taxon described by him ==
- See Category:Taxa named by Benedykt Dybowski

== Taxon named in his honor ==
- Comephorus dybowskii, the little Baikal oilfish, is a species of freshwater ray-finned fish belonging to the family Cottidae, the typical sculpins. This fish is endemic to Lake Baikal in Russia.

== See also ==
- Christopher Szwernicki
- Paweł Edmund Strzelecki
