= Asprocottus platycephalus =

Conservation status
- Least Concern (IUCN 3.1)

Scientific classification
- Kingdom: Animalia
- Phylum: Chordata
- Class: Actinopterygii
- Order: Perciformes
- Suborder: Cottoidei
- Family: Cottidae
- Genus: Asprocottus
- Species: A. platycephalus

Binomial name
- Asprocottus platycephalus Taliev, 1955

Synonyms
- Asprocottus herzensteini platycephalus Taliev, 1955

Species of fish

Asprocottus platycephalus is a species of ray-finned fish belonging to the family Cottidae, the typical sculpins. It was described by Dmitrii Nikolaevich Taliev in 1955, originally as a subspecies of Asprocottus herzensteini. It is a freshwater fish endemic to Lake Baikal, Russia. It is known to dwell at a depth range of 50–800 metres, most commonly between 250 and 460 m. Males can reach a maximum total length of 10.5 centimetres.
