= Neocottus werestschagini =

Conservation status
- Vulnerable (IUCN 3.1)

Scientific classification
- Kingdom: Animalia
- Phylum: Chordata
- Class: Actinopterygii
- Order: Perciformes
- Suborder: Cottoidei
- Family: Cottidae
- Genus: Neocottus
- Species: N. werestschagini

Binomial name
- Neocottus werestschagini (Taliev, 1935)

Synonyms
- Abyssocottus werestschagini Taliev, 1935; Cottinella werestschagini (Taliev, 1935)

Species of fish

Neocottus werestschagini is a species of ray-finned fish belonging to the family Cottidae, the typical sculpins. It was described by Dmitrii Nikolaevich Taliev in 1935, originally under the genus Abyssocottus. It is a rare freshwater, deep water-dwelling fish endemic to Lake Baikal, Russia. It dwells at a depth range of 877 to 1,400 metres (2,877 to 4,593 ft), and inhabits silty sand sediments. Males can reach a maximum total length of 9.8 centimetres (3.9 in).

The diet of N. werestschagini consists of bony fish, gammarids, and debris.
