= Cyphocottus eurystomus =

Conservation status
- Least Concern (IUCN 3.1)

Scientific classification
- Kingdom: Animalia
- Phylum: Chordata
- Class: Actinopterygii
- Order: Perciformes
- Suborder: Cottoidei
- Family: Cottidae
- Genus: Cyphocottus
- Species: C. eurystomus

Binomial name
- Cyphocottus eurystomus (Taliev, 1955)

Synonyms
- Asprocottus megalops eurystomus Taliev, 1955; Limnocottus eurystomus (Taliev, 1955)

Species of fish

Cyphocottus eurystomus is a species of ray-finned fish belonging to the family Cottidae, the typical sculpins. It is endemic to Lake Baikal in Russia. It was described by Dmitrii Nikolaevich Taliev in 1955, originally as a subspecies of Asprocottus megalops. It is a freshwater fish endemic to Lake Baikal, Russia. It is known to dwell at a depth range of 50–600 metres.
