= Asprocottus =

Scientific classification
- Kingdom: Animalia
- Phylum: Chordata
- Class: Actinopterygii
- Order: Perciformes
- Suborder: Cottoidei
- Family: Cottidae
- Genus: Asprocottus; L. S. Berg, 1906

Type species
- Asprocottus herzensteini Berg, 1906

Genus of fishes

Asprocottus is a genus of ray-finned fish belonging to the family Cottidae, the typical sculpins. These fishes are endemic to Lake Baikal in Russia.

== Species ==
There are currently eight recognised species in this genus:

- Asprocottus abyssalis Taliev, 1955
- Asprocottus herzensteini L. S. Berg, 1906 (Herzenstein's rough sculpin)
- Asprocottus intermedius Taliev, 1955
- Asprocottus korjakovi Sideleva, 2001
- Asprocottus minor Sideleva, 2001
- Asprocottus parmiferus Taliev, 1955
- Asprocottus platycephalus Taliev, 1955
- Asprocottus pulcher Taliev, 1955
