= Asprocottus pulcher =

Conservation status
- Least Concern (IUCN 3.1)

Scientific classification
- Kingdom: Animalia
- Phylum: Chordata
- Class: Actinopterygii
- Order: Perciformes
- Suborder: Cottoidei
- Family: Cottidae
- Genus: Asprocottus
- Species: A. pulcher

Binomial name
- Asprocottus pulcher Taliev, 1955

Synonyms
- Cottinella pulchra (Taliev, 1955)

Species of fish

Asprocottus pulcher is a species of ray-finned fish belonging to the family Cottidae, the typical sculpins. It was described by Dmitrii Nikolaevich Taliev in 1955. It is a freshwater fish endemic to Lake Baikal, Russia. It is known to dwell at a depth range of 50–250 metres.
