= Cyphocottus =

Scientific classification
- Kingdom: Animalia
- Phylum: Chordata
- Class: Actinopterygii
- Order: Perciformes
- Suborder: Cottoidei
- Family: Cottidae
- Genus: Cyphocottus; Sideleva, 2003

Type species
- Cottus megalops Gratzianov, 1902

Genus of fishes

Cyphocottus is a genus of ray-finned fish belonging to the family Cottidae, the typical sculpins. These fishes are endemic to Lake Baikal in Russia.

== Species ==
There are currently two recognized species in this genus:

- Cyphocottus eurystomus (Taliev, 1955)
- Cyphocottus megalops (Gratzianov, 1902)
