= Limnocottus pallidus =

Conservation status
- Least Concern (IUCN 3.1)

Scientific classification
- Kingdom: Animalia
- Phylum: Chordata
- Class: Actinopterygii
- Order: Perciformes
- Suborder: Cottoidei
- Family: Cottidae
- Genus: Limnocottus
- Species: L. pallidus

Binomial name
- Limnocottus pallidus Taliev, 1948

Species of fish

Limnocottus pallidus is a species of ray-finned fish belonging to the family Cottidae, the typical sculpins. It is endemic to Lake Baikal in Russia. It dwells at a depth range of 150–1000 metres. Males can reach a total length of 13.1 centimetres and females 14.6 cm. L. pallidus can weigh up to 16 grams, and live up to 12 years.
