= Neocottus =

Scientific classification
- Kingdom: Animalia
- Phylum: Chordata
- Class: Actinopterygii
- Order: Perciformes
- Suborder: Cottoidei
- Family: Cottidae
- Genus: Neocottus; Sideleva, 1982

Type species
- Abyssocottus werestschagini Taliev, 1935

Genus of fishes

Neocottus is a genus of ray-finned fish belonging to the family Cottidae, the typical sculpins. These fishes are endemic to Lake Baikal in Russia.

== Species ==
There are currently two recognized species in this genus:

- Neocottus thermalis Sideleva, 2002
- Neocottus werestschagini (Taliev, 1935)
