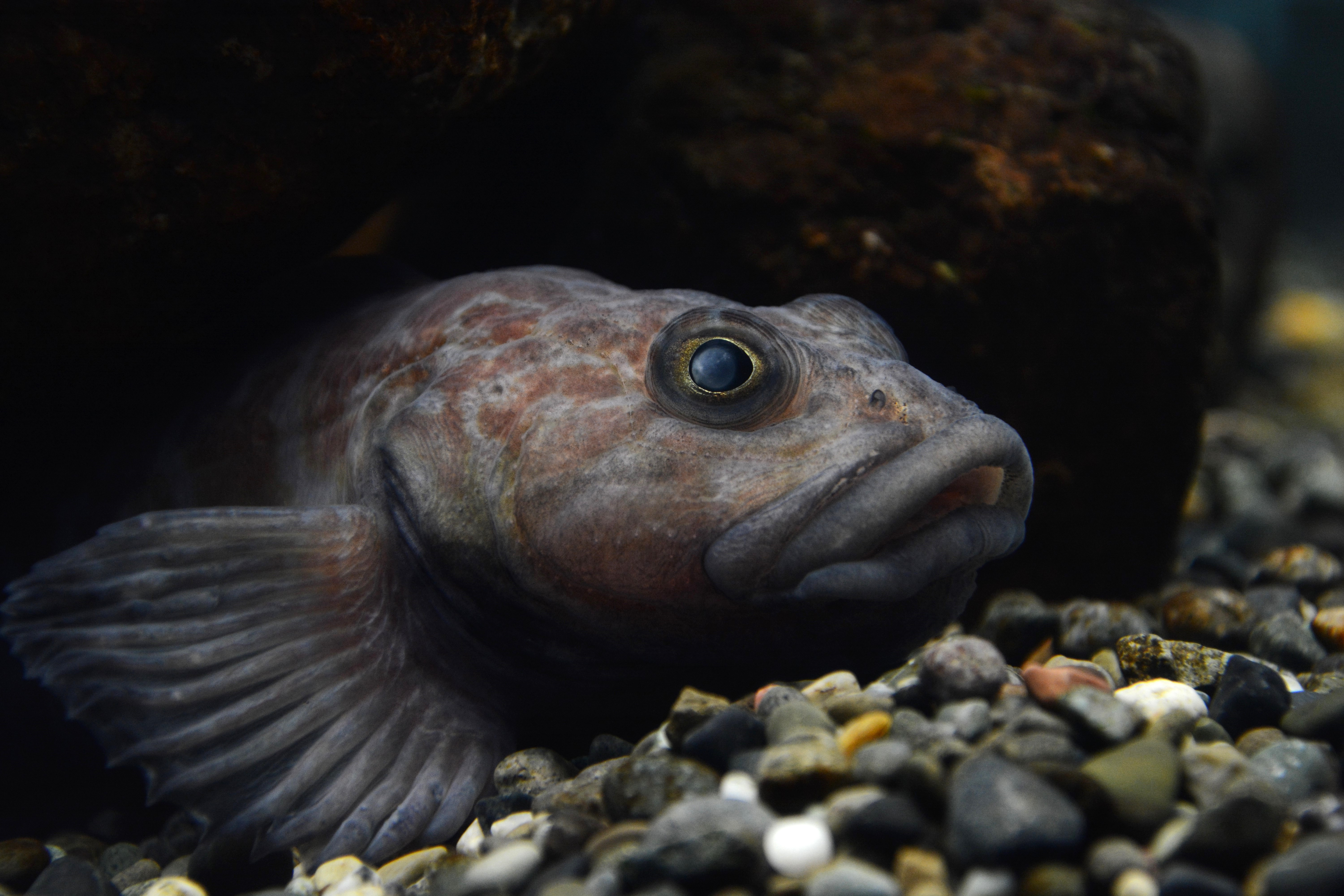
- Procottus major

Scientific classification
- Kingdom: Animalia
- Phylum: Chordata
- Class: Actinopterygii
- Division: Teleostei
- Order: Perciformes
- Suborder: Cottoidei
- Family: Cottidae
- Genus: Procottus; Gratzianov, 1902

Type species
- Cottus jeittelesii Dybowski, 1874

= Procottus =

Genus of fishes

Procottus is a genus of ray-finned fish belonging to the family Cottidae, the typical sculpins. These fishes are endemic to Lake Baikal in Russia.

== Species ==
There are currently six recognized species in this genus:

- Procottus bicolor Dybowski, 1908
- Procottus gotoi Sideleva, 2001
- Procottus gurwicii (Taliev, 1946) (Dwarf sculpin)
- Procottus jeittelesii (Dybowski, 1874) (Red sculpin)
- Procottus major Taliev, 1949
- Procottus minor Taliev, 1946
