= Asprocottus abyssalis =

Conservation status
- Least Concern (IUCN 3.1)

Scientific classification
- Kingdom: Animalia
- Phylum: Chordata
- Class: Actinopterygii
- Order: Perciformes
- Suborder: Cottoidei
- Family: Cottidae
- Genus: Asprocottus
- Species: A. abyssalis

Binomial name
- Asprocottus abyssalis Taliev, 1955

Synonyms
- Asprocottus herzensteini abyssalis Taliev, 1955

Species of fish

Asprocottus abyssalis is a species of ray-finned fish belonging to the family Cottidae, the typical sculpins. It is endemic to Lake Baikal in Russia. It was described by Dmitrii Nikolaevich Taliev in 1955, originally as a subspecies of Asprocottus herzensteini. It is a freshwater fish which is endemic to Lake Baikal, Russia. It is known to dwell at a depth range of 150–1400 metres.
