= Asprocottus minor =

Conservation status
- Data Deficient (IUCN 3.1)

Scientific classification
- Kingdom: Animalia
- Phylum: Chordata
- Class: Actinopterygii
- Order: Perciformes
- Suborder: Cottoidei
- Family: Cottidae
- Genus: Asprocottus
- Species: A. minor

Binomial name
- Asprocottus minor Sideleva, 2001

Synonyms
- Asprocottus korjakovi minor Sideleva, 2001

Species of fish

Asprocottus minor is a species of ray-finned fish belonging to the family Cottidae, the typical sculpins. It was described by Valentina Grigorievna Sideleva in 2001, originally as a subspecies of Asprocottus korjakovi. It is a freshwater fish endemic to Lake Baikal, Russia.
