= Red sculpin =

Conservation status
- Least Concern (IUCN 3.1)

Scientific classification
- Kingdom: Animalia
- Phylum: Chordata
- Class: Actinopterygii
- Order: Perciformes
- Suborder: Cottoidei
- Family: Cottidae
- Genus: Procottus
- Species: P. jeittelesii

Binomial name
- Procottus jeittelesii (Dybowski, 1874)

Synonyms
- Cottus jeittelesii Dybowski, 1874; Procottus jeittelesi bicolor Dybowski, 1908

Species of fish

Procottus jeittelesii, the red sculpin or red Baikal sculpin, is a species of ray-finned fish belonging to the family Cottidae, the typical sculpins. It is endemic to Lake Baikal in Russia. It is a freshwater fish that dwells under stones or in holes in the mud at a depth range of 0 to 800 m (0 to 2,625 ft). It is often found at around 100 m (330 ft), and is most abundant during the autumn and winter. From the late winter to the spring it breeds at depths of 5 to 30 m (16 to 98 ft). It can reach a maximum length of 18 cm (7.1 in), but typically is 10–12 cm (3.9–4.7 in). It has a red spotted or banded pattern on a light background. The red sculpin resembles two of its close relatives, the smaller P. gurwici and the larger P. major.

The red sculpin's diet consists of zoobenthos, especially amphipods but also oligochaetes. Despite its small size, it is caught and eaten by locals, and also eaten by the Baikal seal and other fish.
