= Limnocottus griseus =

Conservation status
- Least Concern (IUCN 3.1)

Scientific classification
- Kingdom: Animalia
- Phylum: Chordata
- Class: Actinopterygii
- Order: Perciformes
- Suborder: Cottoidei
- Family: Cottidae
- Genus: Limnocottus
- Species: L. griseus

Binomial name
- Limnocottus griseus (Taliev, 1955)

Synonyms
- Abyssocottus godlewskii griseus Taliev, 1955

Species of fish

Limnocottus griseus is a species of ray-finned fish belonging to the family Cottidae, the typical sculpins. It was described by Dmitrii Nikolaevich Taliev in 1955, originally as a subspecies of Abyssocottus godlewskii. It is a freshwater fish endemic to Lake Baikal, Russia. It is known to dwell at a depth range of 250–1300 metres.
