= Limnocottus bergianus =

Conservation status
- Least Concern (IUCN 3.1)

Scientific classification
- Kingdom: Animalia
- Phylum: Chordata
- Class: Actinopterygii
- Order: Perciformes
- Suborder: Cottoidei
- Family: Cottidae
- Genus: Limnocottus
- Species: L. bergianus

Binomial name
- Limnocottus bergianus Taliev, 1935

Species of fish

Limnocottus bergianus is a species of ray-finned fish belonging to the family Cottidae, the typical sculpins. It was described by Dmitrii Nikolaevich Taliev in 1935. It is a freshwater fish endemic to Lake Baikal, Russia. It is known to dwell at a depth range of 100–1000 metres. Males can reach a maximum total length of 22.5 centimetres.

L. bergianus feeds primarily on bony fish and gammarids.
