= Limnocottus =

Scientific classification
- Kingdom: Animalia
- Phylum: Chordata
- Class: Actinopterygii
- Division: Teleostei
- Order: Perciformes
- Suborder: Cottoidei
- Family: Cottidae
- Genus: Limnocottus; L. S. Berg, 1906

Type species
- Cottus godlewskii Dybowski, 1874

Genus of fishes

Limnocottus is a genus of ray-finned fish belonging to the family Cottidae, the typical sculpins. These fishes are endemic to Lake Baikal in Russia.

== Species ==
There are currently five recognized species in this genus:

- Limnocottus bergi Dybowski, 1908
- Limnocottus bergianus Taliev, 1935
- Limnocottus godlewskii (Dybowski, 1874)
- Limnocottus griseus (Taliev, 1955)
- Limnocottus pallidus Taliev, 1948
