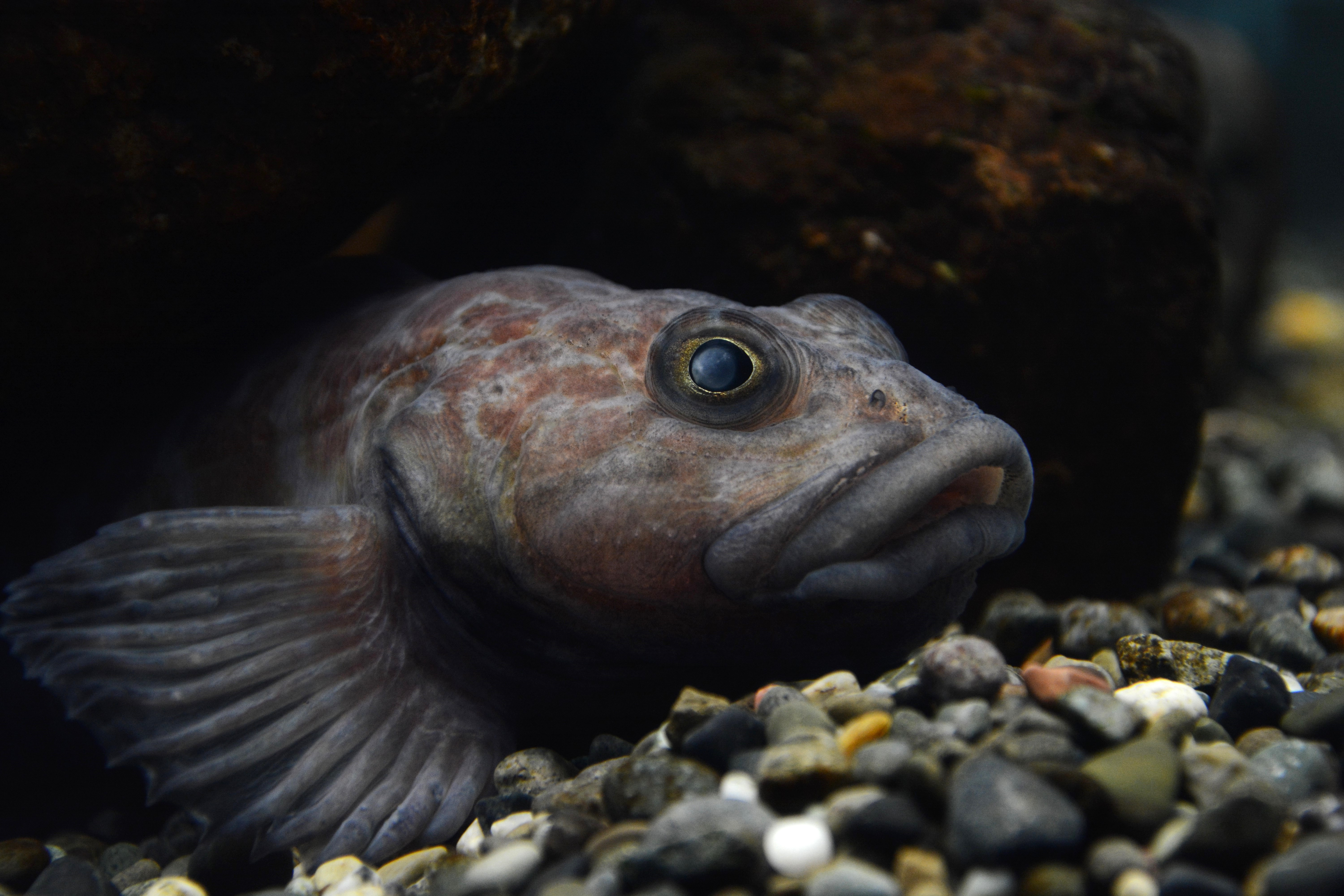

Conservation status
- Least Concern (IUCN 3.1)

Scientific classification
- Kingdom: Animalia
- Phylum: Chordata
- Class: Actinopterygii
- Order: Perciformes
- Suborder: Cottoidei
- Family: Cottidae
- Genus: Procottus
- Species: P. major

Binomial name
- Procottus major Taliev, 1949

Synonyms
- Procottus jeittelesi major Taliev, 1949

= Procottus major =

Species of fish

Procottus major is a species of ray-finned fish belonging to the family Cottidae, the typical sculpins. It is endemic to Lake Baikal in Siberia. It was originally described as a subspecies of the similar but smaller red sculpin (P. jeittelesii). P. major can be found at depths of up to 900 m (3,000 ft), especially on a muddy or rocky-mud bottom. In the spring and summer it typically occurs deeper than 100 m (330 ft), and in the fall and winter from 30 to 200 m (98–656 ft). It can reach a length of 30 cm (12 in), but is usually 18–22 cm (7.1–8.7 in). It feeds on smaller animals, especially gammarids, and breeding occurs in the winter at depths of 60–140 m (200–460 ft). This species is fished and its young are an important food source for other fish.
