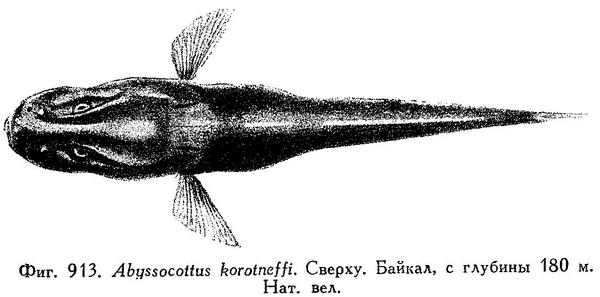
- Abyssocottus korotneffi

Conservation status
- Least Concern (IUCN 3.1)

Scientific classification
- Kingdom: Animalia
- Phylum: Chordata
- Class: Actinopterygii
- Division: Teleostei
- Order: Perciformes
- Suborder: Cottoidei
- Family: Cottidae
- Genus: Abyssocottus
- Species: A. korotneffi

Binomial name
- Abyssocottus korotneffi Berg, 1906.

= Abyssocottus korotneffi =

Species of fish

Abyssocottus korotneffi is a species of ray-finned fish belonging to the family Cottidae, the typical sculpins. It is endemic to Lake Baikal in Russia. It is known to dwell at a depth range of 120–1,600 m (390–5,250 ft), most commonly between 460–500 m (1,510–1,640 ft). Males can reach a maximum total length of 12.6 cm (5.0 in) and females 13.2 cm (5.2 in). Maximum age is 12 years. Females harbour about 20 eggs in each ovary.

== Etymology ==
The fish is named in honor of biologist Alexei Alexeievich Korotneff (1852-1914), of the Kiev University, who dredged all the sculpins from Lake Baikal that Berg examined, including the type of this one.

A. korotneffi feeds predominantly on debris and amphipod crustaceans.
