= Limnocottus godlewskii =

Conservation status
- Least Concern (IUCN 3.1)

Scientific classification
- Kingdom: Animalia
- Phylum: Chordata
- Class: Actinopterygii
- Order: Perciformes
- Suborder: Cottoidei
- Family: Cottidae
- Genus: Limnocottus
- Species: L. godlewskii

Binomial name
- Limnocottus godlewskii (Dybowski, 1874)

Synonyms
- Cottus godlewskii Dybowski, 1874; Limnocottus godlewskii bergi Dybowski, 1908

Species of fish

Limnocottus godlewskii is a species of ray-finned fish belonging to the family Cottidae, the typical sculpins. This fish is endemic to Lake Baikal, Russia; it is a common fish in the lake. It lives at a depth range of 2–830 metres, and inhabits the silty bottom. Males can reach a maximum total length of 19 centimetres.

L. godlewskii spawns in January and February.
