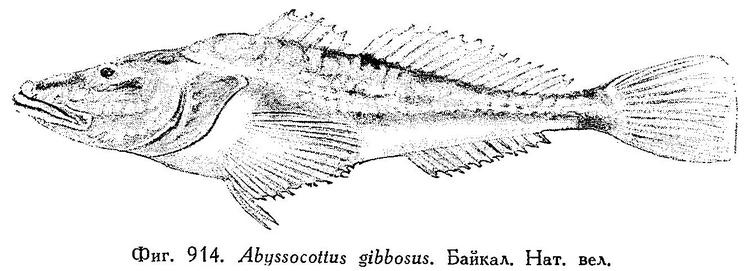

Conservation status
- Least Concern (IUCN 3.1)

Scientific classification
- Kingdom: Animalia
- Phylum: Chordata
- Class: Actinopterygii
- Order: Perciformes
- Suborder: Cottoidei
- Family: Cottidae
- Genus: Abyssocottus
- Species: A. gibbosus

Binomial name
- Abyssocottus gibbosus Berg, 1906

Synonyms
- Abyssocottus gibbosus subulatus Dybowski, 1908; Abyssocottus gibbosus gibbosus Dybowski, 1908

= Abyssocottus gibbosus =

Species of fish

Abyssocottus gibbosus is a species of ray-finned fish belonging to the family Cottidae, the typical sculpins. It is endemic to Lake Baikal in Russia. It dwells at a depth range of 400–1600 metres. Males can reach a maximum total length of 14 centimetres.
