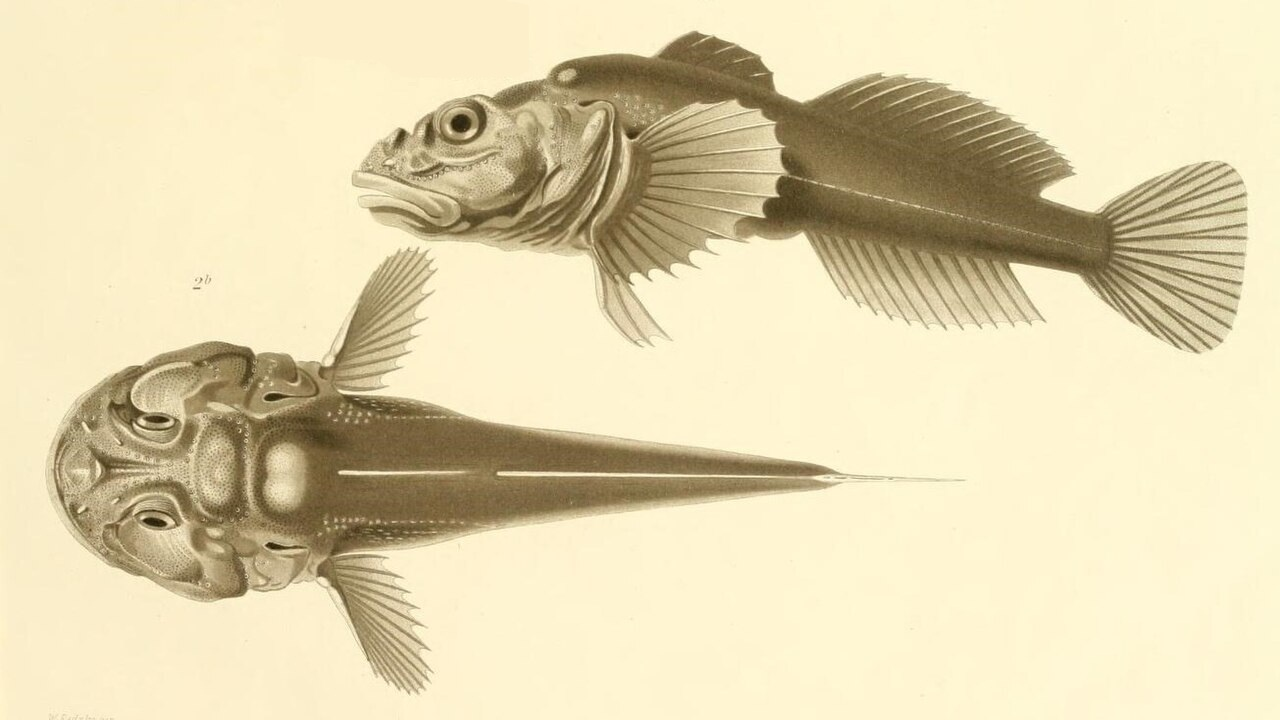

Conservation status
- Least Concern (IUCN 3.1)

Scientific classification
- Kingdom: Animalia
- Phylum: Chordata
- Class: Actinopterygii
- Order: Perciformes
- Suborder: Cottoidei
- Family: Cottidae
- Genus: Cyphocottus
- Species: C. megalops

Binomial name
- Cyphocottus megalops (Gratzianov, 1902)

Synonyms
- Cottus megalops Gratzianov, 1902; Limnocottus megalops (Gratzianov, 1902); Limnocottus kozovi Taliev, 1946

= Vitim sculpin =

Species of fish

The Vitim sculpin (Cyphocottus megalops) is a species of ray-finned fish belonging to the family Cottidae, the typical sculpins. It is endemic to Lake Baikal, Siberia. It is known to dwell at a depth range of 140–370 metres, usually inhabiting the silty bottom at around 100 m. Males can reach a maximum total length of 16.5 centimetres. It can live for up to 9 years.
