= Neocottus thermalis =

Conservation status
- Critically Endangered (IUCN 3.1)

Scientific classification
- Kingdom: Animalia
- Phylum: Chordata
- Class: Actinopterygii
- Order: Perciformes
- Suborder: Cottoidei
- Family: Cottidae
- Genus: Neocottus
- Species: N. thermalis

Binomial name
- Neocottus thermalis Sideleva, 2002

Species of fish

Neocottus thermalis is a species of ray-finned fish belonging to the family Cottidae, the typical sculpins. It was described by Valentina Grigorievna Sideleva in 2002. It is a freshwater, deep water-dwelling fish endemic to Lake Baikal, in Russia. It is known to dwell at a depth range of 430 to 480 metres (1,410 to 1,570 ft).

The IUCN classifies this species as Critically Endangered because it is known only from the vicinity of Frolikha Bay in northern Lake Baikal, a very restricted range, and is threatened by pollution, water extraction and waste-water treatment.
