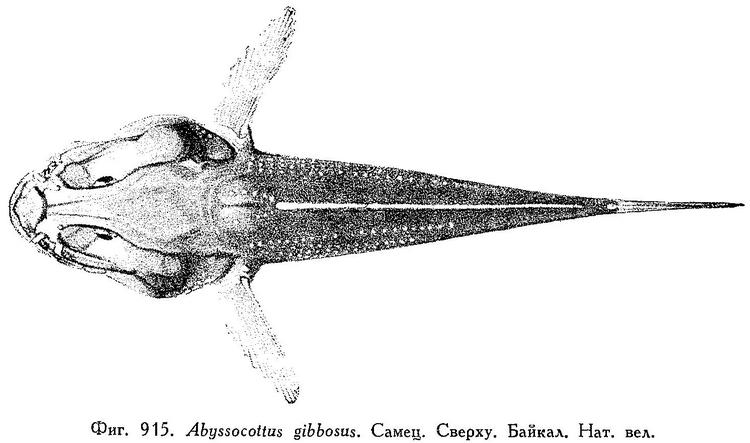
- Abyssocottus gibbosus

Scientific classification
- Kingdom: Animalia
- Phylum: Chordata
- Class: Actinopterygii
- Division: Teleostei
- Order: Perciformes
- Suborder: Cottoidei
- Family: Cottidae
- Genus: Abyssocottus; L. S. Berg, 1906

Type species
- Abyssocottus korotneffi Berg, 1906

= Abyssocottus =

Genus of fishes

Abyssocottus is a genus of ray-finned fishes belonging to the family Cottidae, the typical sculpins. These sculpins are endemic to Lake Baikal in Russia.

== Taxonomy ==
Abyssocottus was first proposed as a genus by the Russian ichthyologist Lev Berg with Abyssocottus korotneffi designated as its type species. The 5th edition of Fishes of the World classified this genus within the subfamily Abyssocottinae. However, other authorities have used phylogenetic studies which have found that Baikal sculpins that were classified in the subfamilies Comephorinae and Abyssocottinae by Fishes of the World radiated from an ancestor which was likely to be within the genus Cottus and that the classification of the Baikal sculpins in a different taxon from Cottus was paraphyletic.

== Species ==
There are currently six recognized species in this genus, in two subgenera.

Subgenus Abyssocottus

- Abyssocottus fuscus Bogdanov, 2014
- Abyssocottus korotneffi L. S. Berg, 1906
- Abyssocottus pumilus Bogdanov, 2014

Subgenus Korotnevia Bogdanov, 2023

- Abyssocottus elochini Taliev, 1955
- Abyssocottus gibbosus L. S. Berg, 1906
- Abyssocottus subulatus (Dybowski, 1908)
