= Procottus gotoi =

Conservation status
- Endangered (IUCN 3.1)

Scientific classification
- Kingdom: Animalia
- Phylum: Chordata
- Class: Actinopterygii
- Order: Perciformes
- Suborder: Cottoidei
- Family: Cottidae
- Genus: Procottus
- Species: P. gotoi

Binomial name
- Procottus gotoi Sideleva, 2001

Species of fish

Procottus gotoi is a species of ray-finned fish belonging to the family Cottidae, the typical sculpins. It is endemic to Lake Baikal in Siberia. This species was first formally described in 2001 by Valentina Grigorievna Sideleva.
