= Abyssocottus elochini =

Conservation status
- Data Deficient (IUCN 3.1)

Scientific classification
- Kingdom: Animalia
- Phylum: Chordata
- Class: Actinopterygii
- Order: Perciformes
- Suborder: Cottoidei
- Family: Cottidae
- Genus: Abyssocottus
- Species: A. elochini

Binomial name
- Abyssocottus elochini Taliev, 1955

Species of fish

Abyssocottus elochini is a species of ray-finned fish belonging to the family Cottidae, the typical sculpins. It is endemic to Lake Baikal in Russia. It is known to dwell at a depth range of 250–300 metres.
