= Dwarf sculpin =

Conservation status
- Vulnerable (IUCN 3.1)

Scientific classification
- Kingdom: Animalia
- Phylum: Chordata
- Class: Actinopterygii
- Order: Perciformes
- Suborder: Cottoidei
- Family: Cottidae
- Genus: Procottus
- Species: P. gurwicii

Binomial name
- Procottus gurwicii (Taliev, 1946)

Synonyms
- Metacottus gurwicii Taliev, 1946; Procottus gurwici (Taliev, 1946); Procottus jeittelesi minor Taliev, 1946

Species of fish

Procottus gurwicii, the dwarf sculpin, is a species of freshwater fish endemic to Lake Baikal in southern Siberia, Russia. It was discovered in 1946 when a single male specimen was found in the coastal waters of the lake, at a depth of about 93 metres. The specimen measured a total length of 6.2 centimetres.
