= Asprocottus korjakovi =

Conservation status
- Data Deficient (IUCN 3.1)

Scientific classification
- Kingdom: Animalia
- Phylum: Chordata
- Class: Actinopterygii
- Order: Perciformes
- Suborder: Cottoidei
- Family: Cottidae
- Genus: Asprocottus
- Species: A. korjakovi

Binomial name
- Asprocottus korjakovi Sideleva, 2001

Species of fish

Asprocottus korjakovi is a species of ray-finned fish belonging to the family Cottidae, the typical sculpins. This species is endemic to the ancient lake Baikal in Siberia. It is a member of the deepwater sculpin family Abyssocottidae, and was described scientifically by Valentina Sideleva in 2001.
