= Herzenstein's rough sculpin =

Conservation status
- Least Concern (IUCN 3.1)

Scientific classification
- Kingdom: Animalia
- Phylum: Chordata
- Class: Actinopterygii
- Order: Perciformes
- Suborder: Cottoidei
- Family: Cottidae
- Genus: Asprocottus
- Species: A. herzensteini

Binomial name
- Asprocottus herzensteini Berg, 1906

Species of fish

Herzenstein's rough sculpin (Asprocottus herzensteini) is a species of ray-finned fish belonging to the family Cottidae, the typical sculpins. It is endemic to Lake Baikal in Russia. It was described by Lev Berg in 1906. It dwells at a depth range of 22–887 metres, and is abundantly found below 60 m. Males can reach a maximum total length of 11.5 centimetres.
