= Dmitrii Nikolaevich Taliev =

- Born: May 28, 1908; Lysva, Russia
- Died: July 2, 1952 (aged 44)
- Citizenship: Soviet Union / Russia
- Education: Leningrad State University
- Scientific career
- Fields: Ichthyology limnology
- Workplaces: Pacific Research Institute of Fisheries and Oceanography; Limnological Institute of the Siberian Division of the Russian Academy of Sciences; Zoological Institute of the Russian Academy of Sciences

Dmitrii Nikolaevich Taliev (28 May 1908 – 2 July 1952) was a Soviet Russian ichthyologist and limnologist, notable for his work on the Lake Baikal.

== Notable Dates ==
- 1930 - Senior Assistant, Pacific Research Institute of Fisheries and Oceanography
- 1932 - Began his work at the Baikal Limnological Research Station of the Academy of Sciences of the USSR (now Limnological Institute of the Siberian Division of the Russian Academy of Sciences)
  - 1932-death, except 1939–41, - Senior Researcher, often executing duties of Deputy Director.
  - 1944-47 - Director
- 1939-41 - Head of the laboratory of Experimental Systematics at the Zoological Institute of the Academy of Sciences of the USSR

== Biography ==
Taliev was born in 1908. His mother was a teacher at an elementary school and his father, an electrical engineer. He developed an interest in zoology early in life. At high school he was a member of the young naturalist club, and later a laboratory assistant at the Sverdlovsk Regional Museum.

After finishing school in Sverdlovsk in 1925 he went to the Leningrad Veterinary Institute (now St. Petersburg State Academy of Veterinary Medicine), (Note: (trans.) Russian: "получил командировку в Ленинградский ветеринарный институт" implies that he received a "business" trip to the Institute. Difficult to translate, possibly to do with the Communist regime.) later transferring to the Physics-Mathematics faculty of the Leningrad State University in 1926.

Whilst at University, he continued bird-watching, studying the birds of the Urals, for which he received a special research trip in the summer of 1927. He also studied the morphology of the stingray brain, in connection with which he spent the summer of 1928 in the Sevastopol Biological Research Station, where he familiarised himself with marine life. In the summer of 1929 he participated in studies of Atlantic cod and White Sea herring as an assistant at the Department of Experimental Ichthyology. These activities resulted in him writing three papers (on causes of albinism in birds (1927), morphology of the stingray brain (1928) and systematisation of Atlantic cod (1931)), two of which were published whilst Taliev was still studying at University.

In the beginning of 1932, Taliev began working at the Baikal Limnological Research Station as a senior researcher. He later became the Station's Director (1955-1947) and worked there until his death in 1952 except for a brief period between 1939 and 1941, when he worked at the Zoological Institute of the Academy of Sciences of the USSR.

At the Baikal Research Station Taliev was the first Russian to study the genesis of Lake Baikal's endemic fauna with the help of reactions of the immune system. He also used this method when systematising Baikal's cottidae and for determining the distribution of commercial fish. By and large most work done in this area was carried out when Taliev was Head of the laboratory of Experimental Systematics at the Zoological Institute of the Academy of Sciences of the USSR.

At the same time, Taliev begun his major study of fish belonging to the suborder cottoidei (sculpins), including in-depth morphology, systematisation and study of evolution. He described a number of new genera and continued observations between 1933 and 1938, with the aim of discovering and implementing economic uses for this fish, in which he eventually succeeded.

Taliev was married to Aleksanda Yakovlevna Bazikalova, who also worked at the Limnological Research Station on systematisation of Amphipoda.

Taliev published 55 scientific papers, mostly in the "Works of the Baikal Limnological Research Station." (Note: (trans.) Russian: "Труды Байкальской Лимнологической Станции" = "Trudy Baikal'skoi limnologischeskoi stantsii") His major work on the morphology and ecology of the sculpins in Lake Baikal was published posthumously.

== Selected publications ==
- Taliev, D.N. (1935). "Neue Formen der Cataphracti aus dem Baikalsee". Trudy Baikal'skoi Limnologischeskoi Stantsii. 6: 59–68.
- A.Y. Bazikalova, T.N. Kalinnikova, V.S. Mikhin and D.N. Taliev, 1937. Materials to the knowledge of Baikal sculpins. Travaux de la Station Limnologique du Lac Baikal 7:109-212.
- Taliev, D.N. (1946). "A new genus Cottoidei from Lake Baikal". Doklady Akademii Nauk SSSR. 54 (1). Moscow: Russian Academy of Sciences: 89–92. ISSN 0869-5652.
- Taliev, D.N. (1946). "Ancestors of the Baikal Cottoidei in Zipo-Zipikan Lakes (Vitim-River System, Basin of the Lena)". Doklady Akademii Nauk SSSR. 54 (8). Moscow: Russian Academy of Sciences: 737–740.
- Taliev, D.N. (1948). "On the rate and the causes of divergent evolution in the Cottoidei from Lake Baikal". Trudy Baikal'skoi Limnologischeskoi Stantsii. 12: 107–158.
- Taliev, D.N. (1955). Nalivkin D.V.; Strelkov A.A. (eds.). Bychki-podkamenshchiki Baikala (Cottoidei) = The Sculpins of Lake Baikal (Cottoidei) (PDF). Moscow/Leningrad: Academy of Sciences of the USSR. p. 603. Archived from the original (PDF) on 2016-03-04. (Note: Cottidae; published posthumously.)

== List of taxa first scientifically described by D.N. Taliev ==
=== Cottocomephoridae ===
- Cottocomephorus alexandrae (Cottocomephorus grewingki subsp. alexandrae), Taliev, 1935

=== Abyssocottidae ===
- Procottus gurwicii, Taliev, 1946
- Procottus major, Taliev, 1949
- Asprocottus abyssalis, Taliev, 1955
- Abyssocottus elochini, Taliev, 1955

== See also ==
- Category:Taxa named by Dmitrii Nikolaevich Taliev
