= List of protected areas of China =

China has more than 10,000 protected areas, covering eighteen percent of the country's land. There are many forms of protected areas in China. Based on their relative importance, each type of protected area can be further graded into two to three levels (national, provincial and prefectural/county level). Nevertheless, the highest rank for "pocket nature preserve" (social and mass-based), "no-hunting area", "no-fishing area", "no-logging area", "wild medicinal material resources conservation area", "crop germplasm resources conservation area", "forest tree germplasm resources conservation area" or "source water protection area" is practically restricted to provincial level. The local government at county level is also responsible for the delimitation and declaration of "basic farmland protection area" and "basic grassland".

Many protected areas (PAs) in China have multiple official designations, and the statutory boundaries of these multi-designated PAs may be identical or may vary from one another. For instance, the boundaries of Huangshan NSHA coincide with those of the Huangshan NGP, whereas Fujian province's Wuyi Mountains NNR, NSHA and NFP are adjacent to each other. In Heilongjiang, 27,642.14 hectares out of 115,340.27 hectares of Huzhong NFP are intersected with the experiment zone of Huzhong NNR.

Following is a list of the protected areas designated by the State Council or its subordinated ministries, and the administrations under the ministries.

== National Park Candidate Regions ==
- Ratified by: State Council
- Number of Est. NPs (unit): 5 (as at September 30, 2021)
- Area of Est. NPs (10,000 km^{2}): 23 (as of 2021)
- Total Number of NPCRs (unit, incl. est. NPs): 49 (as at September 17, 2022)
- Sanjiangyuan National Park/NPCR, coverage:
  - Hoh Xil NNR, Qinghai
  - Sanjiangyuan NNR, Qinghai
  - Gyaring Hu Ngoring Hu Gymnocypris eckloni et Platypharodon extremus NAGRCA, Qinghai
  - Togtun He Endemic Fishes NAGRCA, Qinghai
  - Qumar He Endemic Fishes NAGRCA, Qinghai
  - Yanzhangguaxia Endemic Fishes NAGRCA, Yushu Prefecture, Qinghai
- Giant Panda National Park/NPCR, coverage:
  - Wolong NNR, Sichuan
  - Fengtongzhai NNR, Sichuan
  - Tangjiahe NNR, Sichuan
  - Longxi - Hongkou NNR, Sichuan
  - Wanglang NNR, Sichuan
  - Baishuihe NNR, Sichuan
  - Xuebaoding NNR, Sichuan
  - Xiaozhaizigou NNR, Sichuan
  - Liziping NNR, Sichuan
  - Qianfoshan NNR, Sichuan
  - Qingmuchuan NNR, Shaanxi
  - Baishuijiang NNR, Gansu
  - Huanglongsi SHA of Huanglongsi - Jiuzhaigou NSHA, Sichuan
  - Qingcheng Houshan Scenery Area of Qingchengshan - Dujiangyan NSHA, Sichuan
  - Xiling Xueshan NSHA, Sichuan
  - Bailonghu NSHA, Sichuan
  - Longmenshan NSHA, Sichuan
  - Longmenshan NGP, Sichuan
  - Anxian Bioherm NGP, Sichuan
  - Huanglong NGP, Sichuan
  - Dujiangyan NFP, Sichuan
  - Wawushan NFP, Sichuan
  - Xiling NFP, Sichuan
  - Jiajinshan NFP, Sichuan
  - Longcanggou NFP, Sichuan
  - Longmenshan NFP, Sichuan
  - Qianfoshan NFP, Sichuan
  - Erlangshan NFP, Sichuan
  - Jiguanshan NFP, Sichuan
  - Qingjianghe Endemic Fishes NAGRCA, Sichuan
  - Baishuijiang Schizothorax davidi NAGRCA, Gansu
- Northeast China Tiger and Leopard National Park/NPCR, coverage:
  - Hunchun Northeast China Tiger NNR, Jilin
  - Wangqing NNR, Jilin
  - Muling Japanese Yew NNR, Heilongjiang
  - Laoyeling Northeast China Tiger NNR, Heilongjiang
  - Tumenjiang NFP, Jilin
  - Lanjia Daxiagu NFP, Jilin
  - Jingpohu NFP, Heilongjiang
  - Liufengshan NFP, Heilongjiang
  - Wangqing Gayahe NWP, Jilin
  - Hunchunhe Chum Salmon NAGRCA, Jilin
- Hainan Tropical Rainforest National Park/NPCR, coverage:
  - Bawangling NNR
  - Jianfengling NNR
  - Wuzhishan NNR
  - Diaoluoshan NNR
  - Yinggeling NNR
  - Jianfengling NFP
  - Diaoluoshan NFP
  - Limushan NFP
  - Bawangling NFP
- Wuyishan National Park/NPCR, coverage:
  - Wuyishan NNR, Fujian
  - Jiangxi Wuyishan NNR, Jiangxi
  - Wuyishan NSHA, Fujian
  - Wuyishan NFP, Fujian
  - Wuyi Tianchi NFP, Fujian
  - Ehushan NFP, Jiangxi
  - Jiuquxi Spinibarbus caldwelli NAGRCA, Fujian
- Zhejiang Qianjiangyuan - Baishanzu National Park System Pilot Site/NPCR
- Hubei Shennongjia National Park System Pilot Site/NPCR
- Hunan Nanshan National Park System Pilot Site/NPCR
- Yunnan Bodaco National Park System Pilot Site/Shangêlila NPCR
- Qilianshan National Park System Pilot Site/NPCR
- Yanshan - Saihanba NPCR (Beijing, Hebei)
- Taihangshan NPCR (Shanxi, Henan)
- Hulunbuir NPCR (Inner Mongolia)
- Daqingshan NPCR (Inner Mongolia)
- Badain Jaran NPCR (Inner Mongolia)
- Songnen the Land of Crane NPCR (Inner Mongolia, Jilin, Heilongjiang)
- Da Hinggan Ling NPCR (Inner Mongolia, Heilongjiang)
- Helanshan NPCR (Inner Mongolia, Ningxia)
- Liaohekou NPCR (Liaoning)
- Changbaishan NPCR (Jilin)
- Xiao Hinggan Ling NPCR (Heilongjiang)
- Nan-Beiji Liedao NPCR (Zhejiang)
- Huangshan NPCR (Anhui)
- Jinggangshan NPCR (Jiangxi, Hunan)
- Huanghekou NPCR (Shandong)
- Changdao NPCR (Shandong)
- Zhangjiajie NPCR (Hunan)
- Nanling NPCR (Guangdong)
- Danxiashan NPCR (Guangdong)
- Southwest China Karst NPCR (Guangxi, Guizhou)
- Tropical Marine NPCR (Hainan)
- Konggar Shan NPCR (Sichuan)
- Zoigê NPCR (Sichuan, Gansu)
- Fanjingshan NPCR (Guizhou)
- Ailaoshan NPCR (Yunnan)
- Asian Elephant NPCR (Yunnan)
- Gaoligongshan NPCR (Yunnan, Tibet)
- Yarlung Zangbo Daxiagu NPCR (Tibet)
- Qomolangma Feng NPCR (Tibet)
- Qangtang NPCR (Tibet)
- Kangrinboqê NPCR (Tibet)
- Qinling NPCR (Shaanxi)
- Liupanshan NPCR (Gansu, Ningxia)
- Qinghaihu NPCR (Qinghai)
- Altai Shan NPCR (Xinjiang)
- Tianshan NPCR (Xinjiang)
- Tarim NPCR (Xinjiang)
- Kunlunshan NPCR (Xinjiang)
- Karameili NPCR (Xinjiang)

== National Culture Park System Pilot Program ==
- Great Wall National Culture Park System Pilot Site
- Grand Canal National Culture Park System Pilot Site
- Long March National Culture Park System Pilot Site
- Yellow River National Culture Park System Pilot Site
- Yangtze River National Culture Park System Pilot Site

== National Nature Reserves of China ==
- Ratified by: State Council
- Number of NNRs (unit): 460 (as at October 31, 2026)
- Area of NNRs (10,000 ha): 9,745 (as of 2017)
- Total Number of NRs (unit): 2,694 (as of 2024)
- Area of NRs (10,000 ha): 14914.99 (as of 2024)
- Percentage of Terrestrial NR in the Land Area (%): 14.86 (as of 2017)
- Beijing
  - Songshan National Nature Reserve
  - Baihuashan National Nature Reserve
- Tianjin
  - Jixian Middle-Upper Proterozoic Stratigraphic Section National Nature Reserve, Jizhou
  - Paleocoast and Wetland National Nature Reserve
  - Baxianshan National Nature Reserve
- Hebei
  - Wulingshan National Nature Reserve
  - Changli Huangjin Hai'an National Nature Reserve
  - Weichang Hongsongwa National Nature Reserve
  - Nihewan National Nature Reserve
  - Xiaowutaishan National Nature Reserve
  - Hengshuihu National Nature Reserve
  - Dahaituo National Nature Reserve
  - Liujiang Pendi Geosites National Nature Reserve
  - Saihanba National Nature Reserve
  - Luanhe Shangyou National Nature Reserve
  - Maojingba National Nature Reserve
  - Tuoliang National Nature Reserve
  - Qingyazhai National Nature Reserve
- Shanxi
  - Pangquangou National Nature Reserve
  - Lishan National Nature Reserve
  - Luyashan National Nature Reserve
  - Yangcheng Manghe Rhesus Monkey National Nature Reserve [Macaca mulatta]
  - Wulushan National Nature Reserve
  - Heichashan National Nature Reserve
  - Lingkongshan National Nature Reserve
  - Taikuanhe National Nature Reserve
- Inner Mongolia
  - Daqinggou National Nature Reserve
  - Nei Mongol Helanshan National Nature Reserve
  - Hulunhu National Nature Reserve
  - Horqin National Nature Reserve
  - Da Hinggan Ling Hanma National Nature Reserve
  - Xilin Gol Steppe National Nature Reserve
  - Dal Nur National Nature Reserve
  - Xi Ordos National Nature Reserve
  - Bayan Obo National Nature Reserve
  - Saihan Ul National Nature Reserve
  - Daheishan National Nature Reserve
  - Urad Saxaul Forest-Mongolian Wild Ass National Nature Reserve [Haloxylon ammodendron]-[Equus hemionus hemionus]
  - Ordos Relict Gull National Nature Reserve [Larus relictus]
  - Huihe National Nature Reserve
  - Temeji National Nature Reserve
  - Ejin Euphrates Poplar Forest National Nature Reserve [Populus euphratica]
  - Honggolj Mongolian Scots Pine Forest National Nature Reserve [Pinus sylvestnis var. mongolica]
  - Heilihe National Nature Reserve
  - Ar Horqin Steppe National Nature Reserve
  - Hadan Tohoi National Nature Reserve
  - Ergun National Nature Reserve
  - Otog Dinosaur Trace Fossil National Nature Reserve
  - Daqingshan National Nature Reserve
  - Gogastai Han Ul National Nature Reserve
  - Gurgastai National Nature Reserve
  - Hanshan National Nature Reserve
  - Qingshan National Nature Reserve
  - Bilahe National Nature Reserve
  - Wulanba National Nature Reserve
- Liaoning
  - Dalian Shedao Laotieshan National Nature Reserve
  - Yiwulüshan National Nature Reserve
  - Baishilazi National Nature Reserve
  - Liaohekou National Nature Reserve
  - Dalian Xianrendong National Nature Reserve
  - Dalian Spotted Seal National Nature Reserve [Phoca largha]
  - Yalujiangkou Wetland National Nature Reserve, Dandong
  - Beipiao Bird Fossils National Nature Reserve
  - Laotudingzi National Nature Reserve, Huanren
  - Dalian Chengshantou Coastal Landforms National Nature Reserve
  - Nulu'erhushan National Nature Reserve
  - Haitangshan National Nature Reserve
  - Bailangshan National Nature Reserve
  - Zhanggutai National Nature Reserve
  - Daheishan National Nature Reserve
  - Hongluoshan National Nature Reserve, Huludao
  - Qinglonghe National Nature Reserve
  - Louzishan National Nature Reserve
  - Wuhuading National Nature Reserve
- Jilin
  - Changbaishan National Nature Reserve
  - Xianghai National Nature Reserve
  - Yitong Volcano Group National Nature Reserve
  - Melmeg National Nature Reserve
  - Longjing Tianfozishan National Nature Reserve
  - Yalujiang Shangyou National Nature Reserve
  - Longwan National Nature Reserve
  - Dabs National Nature Reserve
  - ~~Hunchun Northeast China Tiger National Nature Reserve~~
  - Qagan Hu National Nature Reserve
  - Yanminghu National Nature Reserve
  - Songhuajiang Sanhu National Nature Reserve
  - Hani National Nature Reserve
  - Boluohu National Nature Reserve
  - Jingyu National Nature Reserve
  - Huangnihe National Nature Reserve
  - ~~Wangqing National Nature Reserve~~
  - Baishan Siberian Musk Deer National Nature Reserve [Moschus moschiferus parvipes, a subspecies commonly known as the Korean musk deer]
  - Siping Shanmen Mesozoic Volcanism National Nature Reserve
  - Ji'an Wunüfeng National Nature Reserve (renamed, orig. Ji'an NNR)
  - Tonghua Shihu National Nature Reserve
  - Yuanchi Wetland National Nature Reserve
  - Toudao Songhuajiang Shangyou National Nature Reserve
  - Zengfengling National Nature Reserve
- Heilongjiang
  - Zhalong National Nature Reserve
  - Fenglin National Nature Reserve
  - Huzhong National Nature Reserve
  - Mudanfeng National Nature Reserve
  - Xingkaihu National Nature Reserve
  - Wudalianchi National Nature Reserve
  - Honghe National Nature Reserve
  - Liangshui National Nature Reserve
  - Raohe Northeast China Black Bee National Nature Reserve [Apis mellifera ssp.]
  - Sanjiang National Nature Reserve
  - Baoqing Qixinghe National Nature Reserve
  - Raolihe National Nature Reserve
  - Nanwenghe National Nature Reserve
  - Bachadao National Nature Reserve
  - Fenghuangshan National Nature Reserve
  - Wuyiling National Nature Reserve
  - Shengshan National Nature Reserve
  - Zhenbaodao Wetland National Nature Reserve
  - Hongxing Wetland National Nature Reserve
  - Shuanghe National Nature Reserve
  - Dongfanghong National Nature Reserve
  - Dazhanhe Wetland National Nature Reserve
  - Muling Japanese Yew National Nature Reserve [Taxus cuspidata]
  - Xinqing Hooded Crane National Nature Reserve [Grus monacha]
  - Chuonahe National Nature Reserve
  - Duobukur National Nature Reserve
  - Youhao National Nature Reserve
  - Xiaobeihu National Nature Reserve
  - Sanhuanpao National Nature Reserve
  - Uyer He National Nature Reserve (alt. Uyerin Gol)
  - Zhongyangzhan Black-billed Capercaillie National Nature Reserve [Tetrao parvirostris]
  - Maolangou National Nature Reserve
  - Mingshui National Nature Reserve
  - Taipinggou National Nature Reserve
  - Laoyeling Northeast China Tiger National Nature Reserve
  - Daxiagu National Nature Reserve
  - Beijicun National Nature Reserve
  - Gongbielahe National Nature Reserve
  - Bishui Chinese Merganser National Nature Reserve [Mergus squamatus]
  - Cuibei Wetland National Nature Reserve
  - Panzhong National Nature Reserve
  - Pingdingshan National Nature Reserve
  - Wumahe Sable National Nature Reserve [Martes zibellina]
  - Lingfeng National Nature Reserve
  - Heixiazidao National Nature Reserve
  - Qixinglazi Northeast China Tiger National Nature Reserve
  - Xiandongshan Sika Deer National Nature Reserve [Cervus nippon hortulorum, a subspecies commonly known as the Dybowski's, or Ussuri, sika]
  - Langxiang National Nature Reserve
  - Xilinhe National Nature Reserve
- Shanghai
  - Jiuduansha Wetland National Nature Reserve
  - Chongming Dongtan Birds National Nature Reserve
- Jiangsu
  - Yancheng Wetlands and Valuable Fowls National Nature Reserve
  - Dafeng Père David's Deer National Nature Reserve [Elaphurus davidianus]
  - Sihong Hongzehu Wetland National Nature Reserve
- Zhejiang
  - Tianmushan National Nature Reserve, Lin'an
  - Nanji Liedao National Nature Reserve
  - Qianjiangyuan Baishanzu National Nature Reserve (renamed, orig. Fengyangshan - Baishanzu NNR)
  - Wuyanling National Nature Reserve
  - Qingliangfeng National Nature Reserve, Lin'an
  - ~~Gutianshan National Nature Reserve~~
  - Dapanshan National Nature Reserve
  - Jiulongshan National Nature Reserve
  - Changxing Golden Spike Geosites National Nature Reserve
  - Jiushan Liedao National Nature Reserve, Xiangshan
  - Anji Salamander National Nature Reserve, Anji [Hynobius amjiensis]
- Anhui
  - Chinese Alligator National Nature Reserve, Xuancheng [Alligator sinensis]
  - Guniujiang National Nature Reserve
  - Yaoluoping National Nature Reserve
  - Shengjinhu National Nature Reserve
  - Jinzhai Tianma National Nature Reserve
  - Tongling Freshwater Dolphins National Nature Reserve
  - Qingliangfeng National Nature Reserve, Jixi
  - Gujingyuan National Nature Reserve
- Fujian
  - ~~Wuyishan National Nature Reserve~~
  - Meihuashan National Nature Reserve
  - Shenhuwan Submarine Paleoforest Remains National Nature Reserve
  - Longqishan National Nature Reserve, Jiangle
  - Xiamen Valuable and Rare Marine Species National Nature Reserve
  - Huboliao National Nature Reserve
  - Liangyeshan National Nature Reserve
  - Tianbaoyan National Nature Reserve
  - Zhangjiangkou Mangrove Forest National Nature Reserve
  - Daiyunshan National Nature Reserve
  - Minjiangyuan National Nature Reserve
  - Junzifeng National Nature Reserve
  - Xiongjiang Chung's Oak Forest National Nature Reserve [Cyclobalanopsis chungii]
  - Minjiang Estuarine Wetland National Nature Reserve
  - Mangdangshan National Nature Reserve
  - Tingjiangyuan National Nature Reserve
  - Emeifeng National Nature Reserve
- Jiangxi
  - Poyanghu Migratory Birds National Nature Reserve
  - Jinggangshan National Nature Reserve
  - Taohongling Sika Deer National Nature Reserve [Cervus nippon kopschi, a subspecies commonly known as the South China sika]
  - Jiangxi Wuyishan National Nature Reserve
  - Jiulianshan National Nature Reserve
  - Guanshan National Nature Reserve
  - Poyanghu Nanji Wetland National Nature Reserve
  - Matoushan National Nature Reserve
  - Jiulingshan National Nature Reserve
  - Qiyunshan National Nature Reserve
  - Yangjiling National Nature Reserve
  - Ganjiangyuan National Nature Reserve
  - Lushan National Nature Reserve
  - Tongboshan National Nature Reserve
  - Wuyuan Forest Birds National Nature Reserve
  - Nanfengmian National Nature Reserve
- Shandong
  - Shanwang Paleo-organism Fossils National Nature Reserve
  - Changdao National Nature Reserve
  - Huanghe Sanjiaozhou National Nature Reserve
  - Mashan National Nature Reserve
  - Binzhou Shell-Dyke Island and Wetland National Nature Reserve
  - Rongcheng Whooper Swan National Nature Reserve [Cygnus cygnus]
  - Kunyushan National Nature Reserve
- Henan
  - Jigongshan National Nature Reserve
  - Baotianman National Nature Reserve
  - Xinxiang Huanghe Shidi Birds National Nature Reserve
  - Funiushan National Nature Reserve
  - Jiaozuo Taihangshan Rhesus Monkey National Nature Reserve
  - Dongzhai National Nature Reserve
  - Nanyang Dinosaur-Egg Fossil Coenosis National Nature Reserve
  - Huanghe Wetland National Nature Reserve
  - Liankangshan National Nature Reserve
  - Xiaoqinling National Nature Reserve
  - Danjiang Wetland National Nature Reserve
  - Dabieshan National Nature Reserve, Shangcheng
  - Gaoleshan National Nature Reserve
- Hubei
  - Shennongjia National Nature Reserve
  - Whitefin Dolphin National Nature Reserve at Xinluo Section of Yangtze River [Lipotes vexillifer]
  - Changjiang Tian'ezhou Whitefin Dolphin National Nature Reserve
  - Shishou Père David's Deer National Nature Reserve
  - Wufeng Houhe National Nature Reserve
  - Qinglongshan Dinosaur-Egg Fossil Coenosis National Nature Reserve
  - Xingdoushan National Nature Reserve
  - Jiugongshan National Nature Reserve
  - Qizimeishan National Nature Reserve
  - Longganhu National Nature Reserve
  - Saiwudang National Nature Reserve
  - Mulinzi National Nature Reserve
  - Xianfeng Zhongjianhe Chinese Giant Salamander National Nature Reserve [Andrias davidianus]
  - Duheyuan National Nature Reserve
  - Shibalichangxia National Nature Reserve
  - Honghu National Nature Reserve
  - Nanhe National Nature Reserve
  - Dabieshan National Nature Reserve, Yingshan/Luotian
  - Badong Golden Snub-nosed Monkey National Nature Reserve [Rhinopithecus roxellana hubeiensis, a subspecies commonly known as the Hubei golden snub-nosed monkey]
  - Changyang Bengjianzi National Nature Reserve
  - Dalaoling National Nature Reserve
  - Wudaoxia National Nature Reserve
- Hunan
  - Badagongshan National Nature Reserve
  - Dongdongtinghu National Nature Reserve
  - Hupingshan National Nature Reserve
  - Mangshan National Nature Reserve
  - Zhangjiajie Chinese Giant Salamander National Nature Reserve
  - Yongzhou Dupangling National Nature Reserve
  - Xiaoxi National Nature Reserve
  - Yanling Taoyuandong National Nature Reserve
  - Huangsang National Nature Reserve
  - Wuyunjie National Nature Reserve
  - Yingzuijie National Nature Reserve
  - Nanyue Hengshan National Nature Reserve
  - Jiemuxi National Nature Reserve
  - Bamianshan National Nature Reserve
  - Yangmingshan National Nature Reserve
  - Liubuxi National Nature Reserve
  - Shunhuangshan National Nature Reserve, Xinning
  - Gaowangjie National Nature Reserve
  - Dong'an Shunhuangshan National Nature Reserve
  - Baiyunshan National Nature Reserve
  - Xidongtinghu National Nature Reserve
  - Jiuyishan National Nature Reserve
  - Jintongshan National Nature Reserve
- Guangdong
  - Dinghushan National Nature Reserve
  - Neilingdingdao - Futian National Nature Reserve
  - Chebaling National Nature Reserve
  - Huidong Sea Turtles National Nature Reserve [Chelonioidea]
  - Nanling National Nature Reserve
  - Danxiashan National Nature Reserve
  - Zhanjiang Mangrove Forest National Nature Reserve
  - Xiangtoushan National Nature Reserve
  - Zhujiangkou Chinese White Dolphin National Nature Reserve [Sousa chinensis]
  - Xuwen Coral Reef National Nature Reserve
  - Leizhou Valuable and Rare Marine Organisms National Nature Reserve
  - Shimentai National Nature Reserve
  - Nanpeng Liedao National Nature Reserve
  - Luokeng Chinese Crocodile Lizard National Nature Reserve [Shinisaurus crocodilurus]
  - Yunkaishan National Nature Reserve
  - Beibuwan Dugong National Nature Reserve (trans-provincial NNR) [Dugong dugon]
- Guangxi
  - Huaping National Nature Reserve
  - Longgang National Nature Reserve
  - Shankou Mangrove Forest Ecosystem National Nature Reserve
  - Hepu Yingpangang - Yingluogang Dugong National Nature Reserve (note: to be renamed)
  - Fangcheng Golden Camellia National Nature Reserve [Camellia chrysantha]
  - Mulun National Nature Reserve
  - Dayaoshan National Nature Reserve
  - Beilunhekou National Nature Reserve
  - Damingshan National Nature Reserve
  - Mao'ershan National Nature Reserve
  - Shiwandashan National Nature Reserve
  - Qianjiadong National Nature Reserve
  - Cenwanglaoshan National Nature Reserve
  - Jiuwanshan National Nature Reserve
  - Jinzhongshan Hume's Bar-tailed Pheasant National Nature Reserve [Syrmaticus humiae burmanicus, a subspecies commonly known as the Hume's pheasant (Burmese)]
  - Yachang Orchid Plants National Nature Reserve [Orchidaceae]
  - Chongzuo White-headed Black Langur National Nature Reserve [Trachypithecus leucocephalus]
  - Daguishan Chinese Crocodile Lizard National Nature Reserve
  - Bangliang Eastern Black Crested Gibbon National Nature Reserve [Nomascus nasutus]
  - Encheng National Nature Reserve
  - Yuanbaoshan National Nature Reserve
  - Qichong National Nature Reserve
  - Yinzhulaoshan Ziyuan Fir National Nature Reserve [Abies ziyuanensis]
- Hainan
  - Dongzhaigang National Nature Reserve
  - Datian National Nature Reserve
  - Bawangling National Nature Reserve
  - Dazhoudao Marine Ecosystem National Nature Reserve
  - Sanya Coral Reef National Nature Reserve
  - Jianfengling National Nature Reserve
  - Tongguling National Nature Reserve
  - Wuzhishan National Nature Reserve
  - Diaoluoshan National Nature Reserve
  - Yinggeling National Nature Reserve
  - Huangyandao National Nature Reserve
- Chongqing
  - Jinfoshan National Nature Reserve
  - Jinyunshan National Nature Reserve
  - Dabashan National Nature Reserve
  - Valuable, Rare and Endemic Fishes National Nature Reserve at Upper Yangtze River (trans-provincial NNR, shared with Sichuan, Guizhou and Yunnan)
  - Xuebaoshan National Nature Reserve
  - Yintiaoling National Nature Reserve
  - Wulipo National Nature Reserve
- Sichuan
  - ~~Wolong National Nature Reserve~~
  - ~~Fengtongzhai National Nature Reserve~~
  - Mabian Dafengding National Nature Reserve
  - Meigu Dafengding National Nature Reserve
  - Jiuzhaigou National Nature Reserve
  - ~~Tangjiahe National Nature Reserve~~
  - Xiaojin Siguniangshan National Nature Reserve
  - Dukou Cycad National Nature Reserve, Panzhihua [Cycas panzhihuaensis]
  - Konggar Shan National Nature Reserve
  - ~~Longxi - Hongkou National Nature Reserve~~
  - Zoigê Wetland National Nature Reserve
  - Valuable, Rare and Endemic Fishes National Nature Reserve at Upper Yangtze River (trans-provincial NNR, shared with Chongqing, Guizhou and Yunnan)
  - Yading National Nature Reserve
  - ~~Wanglang National Nature Reserve~~
  - ~~Baishuihe National Nature Reserve~~
  - Chaqên Sumdo White-lipped Deer National Nature Reserve [Przewalskium albirostris]
  - Changning Zhuhai National Nature Reserve
  - Huagaoxi National Nature Reserve
  - Micangshan National Nature Reserve, Wangcang
  - ~~Xuebaoding National Nature Reserve~~
  - Hua'eshan National Nature Reserve
  - Haizishan National Nature Reserve
  - Chomsakongma National Nature Reserve
  - Laojunshan National Nature Reserve
  - Nuoshuihe Valuable and Rare Aquatic Animals National Nature Reserve
  - Heizhugou National Nature Reserve
  - Gexigou - Shenxianshan National Nature Reserve
  - ~~Xiaozhaizigou National Nature Reserve~~
  - ~~Liziping National Nature Reserve~~
  - ~~Qianfoshan National Nature Reserve~~
  - Baihe National Nature Reserve
  - Namoqê Wetland National Nature Reserve
- Guizhou
  - Fanjingshan National Nature Reserve
  - Maolan National Nature Reserve
  - Weining Caohai National Nature Reserve
  - Chishui Spinulose Tree Fern National Nature Reserve [Alsophila spinulosa]
  - Xishui Mid-subtropical Evergreen Broad-leaved Forest National Nature Reserve
  - Leigongshan National Nature Reserve
  - Mayanghe National Nature Reserve
  - Valuable, Rare and Endemic Fishes National Nature Reserve at Upper Yangtze River (trans-provincial NNR, shared with Chongqing, Sichuan and Yunnan)
  - Kuankuoshui National Nature Reserve
  - Fodingshan National Nature Reserve
  - Dashahe National Nature Reserve
- Yunnan
  - Nan'gunhe National Nature Reserve
  - Xishuangbanna National Nature Reserve
  - Gaoligongshan National Nature Reserve
  - Baima Xueshan National Nature Reserve
  - Ailaoshan National Nature Reserve
  - Cangshan Erhai National Nature Reserve
  - Xishuangbanna Nabanhe Liuyu National Nature Reserve
  - Wuliangshan National Nature Reserve
  - Jinping Watershed National Nature Reserve
  - Daweishan National Nature Reserve
  - Dashanbao Black-necked Crane National Nature Reserve [Grus nigricollis]
  - Huanglianshan National Nature Reserve
  - Wenshan National Nature Reserve
  - Valuable, Rare and Endemic Fishes National Nature Reserve at Upper Yangtze River (trans-provincial NNR, shared with Chongqing, Sichuan and Guizhou)
  - Yaoshan National Nature Reserve
  - Huize Black-necked Crane National Nature Reserve
  - Yongde Daxueshan National Nature Reserve
  - Jiaozishan National Nature Reserve
  - Yunlong Tianchi National Nature Reserve
  - Yuanjiang National Nature Reserve
  - Wumengshan National Nature Reserve
- Tibet
  - Yarlung Zangbo Daxiagu National Nature Reserve
  - Qomolangma Feng National Nature Reserve
  - Qangtang National Nature Reserve
  - Cibagou National Nature Reserve. Zayü
  - Markam Yunnan Snub-nosed Monkey National Nature Reserve [Rhinopithecus bieti]
  - Sêrlingco National Nature Reserve
  - Black-necked Crane National Nature Reserve at Midstream Valley of Yarlung Zangbo
  - Laru Wetland National Nature Reserve
  - Riwoq Red Deer National Nature Reserve [Cervus elaphus macneilli, a subspecies commonly known as the Sichuan red deer]
  - Midika Wetland National Nature Reserve
  - Mapam Yumco Wetland National Nature Reserve
- Shaanxi
  - Foping National Nature Reserve
  - Taibaishan National Nature Reserve
  - Zhouzhi National Nature Reserve
  - Niubeiliang National Nature Reserve
  - Changqing National Nature Reserve
  - Hanzhong Crested Ibis National Nature Reserve [Nipponia nippon]
  - Ziwuling National Nature Reserve
  - Hualongshan National Nature Reserve
  - Tianhuashan National Nature Reserve
  - Qingmuchuan National Nature Reserve
  - Sangyuan National Nature Reserve
  - Longxian Qinling Lenok National Nature Reserve [Brachymystax lenok tsinlingensis]
  - Yan'an Huanglongshan Brown Eared-Pheasant National Nature Reserve [Crossoptilon mantchuricum]
  - Micangshan National Nature Reserve, Xixiang
  - Hancheng Huanglongshan Brown Eared-Pheasant National Nature Reserve
  - Taibai Xushuihe Valuable and Rare Aquatic Organisms National Nature Reserve
  - Zibaishan National Nature Reserve
  - Lüeyang Valuable and Rare Aquatic Animals National Nature Reserve
  - Huangbaiyuan National Nature Reserve
  - Pingheliang National Nature Reserve
  - Laoxiancheng National Nature Reserve
  - Guanyinshan National Nature Reserve
  - Danfeng Wuguanhe Valuable and Rare Aquatic Animals National Nature Reserve
  - Heihe Valuable and Rare Wild Aquatic Animals National Nature Reserve
  - Motianling National Nature Reserve
  - Hongjiannao National Nature Reserve
- Gansu
  - ~~Baishuijiang National Nature Reserve~~
  - Xinglongshan National Nature Reserve
  - Qilianshan National Nature Reserve
  - Anxi Extreme-arid Desert National Nature Reserve, Guazhou
  - Gahai Zaica National Nature Reserve
  - Minqin Liangucheng National Nature Reserve
  - Lianhuashan National Nature Reserve
  - Dunhuang Xihu National Nature Reserve
  - Taitong - Kongtongshan National Nature Reserve
  - Liancheng National Nature Reserve
  - Xiaolongshan National Nature Reserve
  - Yanchiwan National Nature Reserve
  - Annanba Wild Bactrian Camel National Nature Reserve [Camelus ferus]
  - Taohe National Nature Reserve
  - Dunhuang Yangguan National Nature Reserve
  - Zhangye Heihe Wetland National Nature Reserve
  - Taizishan National Nature Reserve
  - Zhangxian Valuable and Rare Aquatic Animals National Nature Reserve
  - Huanghe Shouqu National Nature Reserve (alt. First Bend of the Yellow River)
  - Qinzhou Valuable and Rare Wild Aquatic Animals National Nature Reserve
  - Dora National Nature Reserve
- Qinghai
  - Longbao National Nature Reserve
  - Qinghaihu National Nature Reserve
  - Hoh Xil National Nature Reserve
  - Xunhua Mengda National Nature Reserve
  - Sanjiangyuan National Nature Reserve
  - Qaidam Saxaul Forest National Nature Reserve
  - Datong Beichuanhe Source Area National Nature Reserve
- Ningxia
  - Helanshan National Nature Reserve
  - Liupanshan National Nature Reserve
  - Zhongwei Shapotou National Nature Reserve
  - Lingwu Baijitan National Nature Reserve
  - Luoshan National Nature Reserve
  - Habahu National Nature Reserve
  - Yunwushan National Nature Reserve
  - Huoshizhai Danxia Landform National Nature Reserve
  - Nanhuashan National Nature Reserve
- Xinjiang
  - Altun Shan National Nature Reserve
  - Hanas National Nature Reserve
  - Bayanbulag National Nature Reserve
  - Xitianshan National Nature Reserve
  - Ganjiahu Saxaul Forest National Nature Reserve
  - Tomur Feng National Nature Reserve
  - Lop Nur Wild Bactrian Camel National Nature Reserve
  - Tarim Euphrates Poplar National Nature Reserve [Populus euphratica]
  - Ebi Hu Wetland National Nature Reserve
  - Bulgan He Eurasian Beaver National Nature Reserve [Castor fiber birulai, a subspecies commonly known as the Sino-Mongolian beaver]
  - Barluk Shan National Nature Reserve
  - Huocheng Four-toed Tortoise National Nature Reserve [Testudo horsfieldii]
  - Ili Bunge's Ash National Nature Reserve [Fraxinus bungeana]
  - Altay Koksu Wetland National Nature Reserve
  - Wenquan Semirechensk Salamander National Nature Reserve [Ranodon sibiricus]

== National Scenic and Historic Areas of China ==
- Ratified by: State Council
- Number of NSHAs (unit): 244 (as at October 31, 2026)
- Area of NSHAs (10,000 km^{2}): 10.36 (as of 2013)
- Total Number of SHAs (unit): 1,058 (as of 2024)
- Area of SHAs (10,000 ha): 1965.27 (as of 2024)
- Percentage of SHAs in the Land Area (%): 2.03 (as of 2013)
- Beijing
  - Badaling - Shisanling Scenic and Historic Area
  - Shihuadong Scenic and Historic Area
- Tianjin
  - Panshan Scenic and Historic Area
- Hebei
  - Chengde Bishushanzhuang Waibamiao Scenic and Historic Area
  - Qinhuangdao Beidaihe Scenic and Historic Area
  - Yesanpo Scenic and Historic Area
  - Cangyanshan Scenic and Historic Area
  - Zhangshiyan Scenic and Historic Area
  - Xibaipo - Tianguishan Scenic and Historic Area
  - Kongshan Baiyundong Scenic and Historic Area
  - Taihang Daxiagu Scenic and Historic Area
  - Xiangtangshan Scenic and Historic Area
  - Wahuanggong Scenic and Historic Area
- Shanxi
  - Wutaishan Scenic and Historic Area
  - Hengshan Scenic and Historic Area, Hunyuan
  - Huanghe Hukou Pubu Scenic and Historic Area (trans-provincial NHSA, shared with Shaanxi)
  - Beiwudangshan Scenic and Historic Area
  - Wulaofeng Scenic and Historic Area
  - Qikou Scenic and Historic Area
- Inner Mongolia
  - Zalantun Scenic and Historic Area
  - Ergun Scenic and Historic Area
- Liaoning
  - Anshan Qianshan National Scenic and Historic Area
  - Yalujiang National Scenic and Historic Area
  - Dalian Jinshitan National Scenic and Historic Area
  - Xingcheng Haibin National Scenic and Historic Area
  - Dalian Haibin - Lüshunkou National Scenic and Historic Area
  - Fenghuangshan National Scenic and Historic Area
  - Benxi Shuidong National Scenic and Historic Area
  - Qingshangou National Scenic and Historic Area
  - Yiwulüshan National Scenic and Historic Area
- Jilin
  - Songhuahu National Scenic and Historic Area
  - "Badabu" - Jingyuetan National Scenic and Historic Area
  - Helong Xianjingtai National Scenic and Historic Area
  - Hunchun Fangchuan National Scenic and Historic Area
- Heilongjiang
  - Jingpohu Scenic and Historic Area
  - Wudalianchi Scenic and Historic Area
  - Taiyangdao Scenic and Historic Area
  - Dazhanhe Scenic and Historic Area
- Jiangsu
  - Taihu National Scenic and Historic Area
  - Zhongshan National Scenic and Historic Area, Nanjing
  - Yuntaishan National Scenic and Historic Area
  - Shugang Shouxihu National Scenic and Historic Area
  - Sanshan National Scenic and Historic Area
- Zhejiang
  - Hangzhou Xihu National Scenic and Historic Area
  - Fuchunjiang Xin'anjiang National Scenic and Historic Area
  - Yandangshan National Scenic and Historic Area
  - Putuoshan National Scenic and Historic Area
  - Tiantaishan National Scenic and Historic Area, Tiantai
  - Shengsi Liedao National Scenic and Historic Area
  - Nanxijiang National Scenic and Historic Area
  - Moganshan National Scenic and Historic Area
  - Xuedoushan National Scenic and Historic Area
  - Shuanglong National Scenic and Historic Area
  - Xiandu National Scenic and Historic Area
  - Jianglangshan National Scenic and Historic Area
  - Xianju National Scenic and Historic Area
  - Huanjiang Wuxie National Scenic and Historic Area
  - Fangyan National Scenic and Historic Area
  - Baizhangji Feiyunhu National Scenic and Historic Area
  - Fangshan Changyu Dongtian National Scenic and Historic Area
  - Tianmushan National Scenic and Historic Area, Xinchang
  - Dahongyan National Scenic and Historic Area
  - Jiaxi Juxi National Scenic and Historic Area (renamed, orig. Dapanshan NSHA)
  - Taozhu National Scenic and Historic Area
  - Xianhuashan National Scenic and Historic Area
- Anhui
  - Huangshan Scenic and Historic Area
  - Jiuhuashan Scenic and Historic Area
  - Tianzhushan Scenic and Historic Area
  - Langyashan Scenic and Historic Area
  - Qiyunshan Scenic and Historic Area
  - Caishi Scenic and Historic Area
  - Chaohu Scenic and Historic Area
  - Huashan Miku - Jianjiang Scenic and Historic Area
  - Taijidong Scenic and Historic Area
  - Huatinghu Scenic and Historic Area
  - Longchuan Scenic and Historic Area
  - Qishan - Pingtianhu Scenic and Historic Area
- Fujian
  - ~~Wuyishan Scenic and Historic Area~~
  - Qingyuanshan National Scenic and Historic Area
  - Gulangyu - Wanshishan National Scenic and Historic Area
  - Taimushan National Scenic and Historic Area
  - Taoyuandong - Linyin Shilin National Scenic and Historic Area
  - Taining National Scenic and Historic Area
  - Yuanyangxi National Scenic and Historic Area
  - Haitan National Scenic and Historic Area
  - Guanzhishan National Scenic and Historic Area (locally pronounced Guanzhaishan)
  - Gushan National Scenic and Historic Area
  - Yuhuadong National Scenic and Historic Area
  - Shibachongxi National Scenic and Historic Area
  - Qingyunshan National Scenic and Historic Area
  - Fozishan National Scenic and Historic Area
  - Baoshan National Scenic and Historic Area
  - Fu'an Baiyunshan National Scenic and Historic Area
  - Lingtongshan National Scenic and Historic Area
  - Meizhoudao National Scenic and Historic Area
  - Jiulongji National Scenic and Historic Area
- Jiangxi
  - Lushan Scenic and Historic Area
  - Jinggangshan Scenic and Historic Area
  - Sanqingshan Scenic and Historic Area
  - Longhushan Scenic and Historic Area
  - Xiannühu Scenic and Historic Area
  - Sanbaishan Scenic and Historic Area
  - Meiling - Tengwangge Scenic and Historic Area
  - Guifeng Scenic and Historic Area
  - Gaoling - Yaoli Scenic and Historic Area
  - Wugongshan Scenic and Historic Area
  - Yunjushan - Zhelinhu Scenic and Historic Area
  - Lingshan Scenic and Historic Area
  - Shennongyuan Scenic and Historic Area
  - Damaoshan Scenic and Historic Area
  - Ruijin Scenic and Historic Area
  - Xiaowudang Scenic and Historic Area
  - Yangqishan Scenic and Historic Area
  - Hanxianyan Scenic and Historic Area
- Shandong
  - Taishan Scenic and Historic Area
  - Qingdao Laoshan Scenic and Historic Area
  - Jiaodong Bandao Haibin Scenic and Historic Area
  - Boshan Scenic and Historic Area
  - Qingzhou Scenic and Historic Area
  - Qianfoshan Scenic and Historic Area
- Henan
  - Jigongshan Scenic and Historic Area
  - Luoyang Longmen Scenic and Historic Area
  - Songshan Scenic and Historic Area
  - Wangwushan - Yuntaishan Scenic and Historic Area
  - Shirenshan Scenic and Historic Area
  - Linlüshan Scenic and Historic Area
  - Qingtianhe Scenic and Historic Area
  - Shennongshan Scenic and Historic Area
  - Tongbaishan - Huaiyuan Scenic and Historic Area
  - Zhengzhou Huanghe Scenic and Historic Area
- Hubei
  - Wuhan Donghu Scenic and Historic Area
  - Wudangshan Scenic and Historic Area
  - Changjiang Sanxia Scenic and Historic Area (trans-provincial NHSA, shared with Chongqing)
  - Dahongshan Scenic and Historic Area
  - Longzhong Scenic and Historic Area
  - Jiugongshan Scenic and Historic Area
  - Lushui Scenic and Historic Area
  - Danjiangkou Shuiku Scenic and Historic Area
- Hunan
  - Hengshan Scenic and Historic Area, Hengyang
  - Wulingyuan Scenic and Historic Area
  - Yueyanglou Dongtinghu Scenic and Historic Area
  - Shaoshan Scenic and Historic Area
  - Yuelushan Scenic and Historic Area
  - Langshan Scenic and Historic Area
  - Mengdonghe Scenic and Historic Area
  - Taohuayuan Scenic and Historic Area
  - Ziquejie Titian - Meishan Longgong Scenic and Historic Area
  - Dehang Scenic and Historic Area
  - Suxianling - Wanhuayan Scenic and Historic Area
  - Nanshan Scenic and Historic Area
  - Wanfoshan - Dongzhai Scenic and Historic Area
  - Huxingshan - Huayao Scenic and Historic Area
  - Dongjianghu Scenic and Historic Area
  - Fenghuang Scenic and Historic Area
  - Weishan Scenic and Historic Area
  - Yandiling Scenic and Historic Area
  - Baishuidong Scenic and Historic Area
  - Jiuyishan - Shundiling Scenic and Historic Area
  - Liye - Wulongshan Scenic and Historic Area
- Guangdong
  - Zhaoqing Xinghu National Scenic and Historic Area
  - Xiqiaoshan National Scenic and Historic Area
  - Danxiashan National Scenic and Historic Area
  - Baiyunshan National Scenic and Historic Area
  - Huizhou Xihu National Scenic and Historic Area
  - Luofushan National Scenic and Historic Area
  - Huguangyan National Scenic and Historic Area
  - Wutongshan National Scenic and Historic Area
- Guangxi
  - Guilin Lijiang Scenic and Historic Area
  - Guiping Xishan Scenic and Historic Area
  - Huashan Scenic and Historic Area
- Hainan
  - Sanya Redai Haibin Scenic and Historic Area
- Chongqing
  - Changjiang Sanxia Scenic and Historic Area (trans-provincial NSHA, shared with Hubei)
  - Chongqing Jinyunshan Scenic and Historic Area
  - Jinfoshan Scenic and Historic Area
  - Simianshan Scenic and Historic Area
  - Furongjiang Scenic and Historic Area
  - Tiankeng Difeng Scenic and Historic Area
  - Tanzhangxia Scenic and Historic Area
- Sichuan
  - Emeishan National Scenic and Historic Area
  - Leshan Dafo National Scenic and Historic Area (note: split from the Emeishan NSHA)
  - Huanglong National Scenic and Historic Area
  - Jiuzhaigou National Scenic and Historic Area (note: split with the Huanglong SHA, orig. Huanglongsi - Jiuzhaigou NSHA)
  - Qingchengshan - Dujiangyan National Scenic and Historic Area
  - Jianmen Shudao - Cuiyunlang National Scenic and Historic Area (renamed, orig. Jianmen Shudao NSHA)
  - Konggar Shan National Scenic and Historic Area
  - Shunan Zhuhai National Scenic and Historic Area
  - ~~Xiling Xueshan Scenic and Historic Area~~
  - Siguniangshan National Scenic and Historic Areas
  - Shihai Dongxiang National Scenic and Historic Area
  - Qionghai - Luojishan National Scenic and Historic Area
  - Bailonghu National Scenic and Historic Area
  - Guangwushan - Nuoshuihe National Scenic and Historic Area
  - Qionglai Tiantaishan National Scenic and Historic Area
  - Longmenshan National Scenic and Historic Area
  - Micangshan Daxiagu National Scenic and Historic Area
- Guizhou
  - Huangguoshu Scenic and Historic Area
  - Zhijindong Scenic and Historic Area
  - Wuyanghe Scenic and Historic Area
  - Hongfenghu Scenic and Historic Area
  - Longgong Scenic and Historic Area
  - Libo Zhangjiang Scenic and Historic Area
  - Chishui Scenic and Historic Area
  - Malinghe Xiagu Scenic and Historic Area
  - Duyun Doupengshan - Jianjiang Scenic and Historic Area
  - Jiudongtian Scenic and Historic Area
  - Jiulongdong Scenic and Historic Area
  - Liping Dongxiang Scenic and Historic Area
  - Ziyun Getuhe Chuandong Scenic and Historic Area
  - Pingtang Scenic and Historic Area
  - Rongjiang Miaoshan Dongshui Scenic and Historic Area
  - Shiqian Wenquanqun Scenic and Historic Area
  - Yanhe Wujiang Shanxia Scenic and Historic Area
  - Weng'an Jiangjiehe Scenic and Historic Area
- Yunnan
  - Lunan Shilin Scenic and Historic Area (officially designated name. “Lunan Yi Autonomous County” was renamed as “Shilin Yi Autonomous County” on October 8, 1998.)
  - Dali Scenic and Historic Area
  - Xishuangbanna Scenic and Historic Area
  - Sanjiangbingliu Scenic and Historic Area
  - Kunming Dianchi Scenic and Historic Area
  - Lijiang Yulong Xueshan Scenic and Historic Area
  - Tengchong Dire Huoshan Scenic and Historic Area
  - Ruilijiang - Dayingjiang Scenic and Historic Area
  - Jiuxiang Scenic and Historic Area
  - Jianshui Scenic and Historic Area
  - Puzhehei Scenic and Historic Area
  - Alu Scenic and Historic Area
- Tibet
  - Yarlung He National Scenic and Historic Area
  - Namco - Nyainqêntanglha Shan National Scenic and Historic Area
  - Tanggulashan - Nujiangyuan National Scenic and Historic Area
  - Tulin - Gugê National Scenic and Historic Area
- Shaanxi
  - Huashan Scenic and Historic Area
  - Lintong Lishan Scenic and Historic Area
  - Huanghe Hukou Pubu Scenic and Historic Area (trans-provincial NSHA, shared with Shanxi)
  - Baoji Tiantaishan Scenic and Historic Area
  - Huangdiling Scenic and Historic Area
  - Heyang Qiachuan Scenic and Historic Area (Qiachuan: locally pronounced Hechuan)
- Gansu
  - Maijishan National Scenic and Historic Area
  - Kongtongshan National Scenic and Historic Area
  - Mingshashan - Yueyaquan National Scenic and Historic Area
  - Guanshan Lianhuatai National Scenic and Historic Area
- Qinghai
  - Qinghaihu Scenic and Historic Area
- Ningxia
  - Xixia Wangling National Scenic and Historic Area
  - Xumishan Shiku National Scenic and Historic Area
- Xinjiang
  - Tianshan Tianchi National Scenic and Historic Area
  - Kumtag Shamo National Scenic and Historic Area
  - Bosten Hu National Scenic and Historic Area
  - Sairam Hu National Scenic and Historic Area
  - Lopren Cunzhai National Scenic and Historic Area (alt. “Lop People's Stockade Village”)
  - Tomur Daxiagu National Scenic and Historic Area

== National Typical Earthquake Sites of China ==
- Ratified by: China Earthquake Administration
- Total Number of NTESs (unit): 6 (as of 2007)
- Shandong
  - Site of Seismically Active Fault at Maipo, Tancheng
  - Site of Collapse-Crack Earthquake at Xiong'er Hill, Zaozhuang
- Chongqing
  - Site of Ancient Earthquake at Xiaonanhai, Qianjiang
- Yunnan
  - Site of Large Earthquake-formed “Heavenly Pit” at Hongshi Cliff, Yongsheng ("Heavenly Pit": a massive sinkhole. Designated name: “Yongsheng Hongshiya National Earthquake Site”.)
- Ningxia
  - Site of Earthquake-induced Landslide and Dammed Lake at Dangjiacha, Xiji
  - Site of Large Earthquake and Active Fault Zone in Haiyuan †

†: The official name is yet to be verified.

== National Geoparks of China ==
- Ratified by: State Forestry and Grassland Administration
- Number of NGPs (unit): 260 (as at July 23, 2026)
- Area of NGPs (10,000 ha): TBV
- Total Number of GPs (unit): 558 (excl. GGPs, as of 2024)
- Area of GPs (10,000 ha): 794.34 (as of 2024)
- Beijing
  - Shihuadong National Geopark
  - Yanqing Petrified Wood National Geopark
  - Shidu National Geopark
  - Miyun Yunmengshan National Geopark
  - Pinggu Huangsongyu National Geopark
- Tianjin
  - Jixian National Geopark
- Hebei
  - Laiyuan Baishishan National Geopark
  - Fuping Tianshengqiao National Geopark (Tianshengqiao: literally "Natural Bridge", a proper name for the park)
  - Qinhuangdao Liujiang National Geopark
  - Zanhuang Zhangshiyan National Geopark
  - Laishui Yesanpo National Geopark
  - Lincheng National Geopark
  - Wu'an National Geopark
  - Xinglong National Geopark
  - Qian'an National Geopark
  - Chengde Danxia Landform National Geopark
  - Xingtai Canyon Group National Geopark
- Shanxi
  - Huanghe Hukou Pubu National Geopark (trans-provincial NGP, shared with Shaanxi)
  - Wutaishan National Geopark
  - Huguan Canyon National Geopark
  - Ningwu Ice Cave National Geopark
  - Lingchuan Wangmangling National Geopark
  - Datong Volcano Group National Geopark
  - Pingshun Tianjishan National Geopark
  - Yonghe Yellow River Meander National Geopark
  - Yushe Paleo-organism Fossils Geopark
  - Youyu Volcanic Necks Geopark
  - Xixian Loess Geopark
- Inner Mongolia
  - Hexigten National Geopark
  - Arxan National Geopark
  - Alxa Desert National Geopark
  - Erenhot National Geopark
  - Ningcheng National Geopark
  - Bayannur National Geopark
  - Ordos National Geopark
  - Qingshuihe Laoniuwan National Geopark
  - Siziwang Geopark (Siziwang = Dorbod)
  - Oroqen Geopark
  - Xilin Gol Caoyuan Volcano Geopark
  - Qiguoshan Geopark, Bairin Left Banner
  - Ulanqab National Geopark
- Liaoning
  - Chaoyang Bird Fossils National Geopark
  - Dalian Coast National Geopark
  - Benxi National Geopark
  - Dalian Bingyugou National Geopark
  - Jinzhou Paleo-organism Fossils and Granite National Geopark
  - Huludao Longtan Daxiagu Geopark
- Jilin
  - Jingyu Volcano and Mineral Spring Cluster National Geopark
  - Changbaishan Volcano National Geopark
  - Qian'an Mud Forest National Geopark
  - Fusong National Geopark
  - Siping Geopark
  - Longwan Volcano Geopark, Huinan
- Heilongjiang
  - Wudalianchi Volcanic Landforms National Geopark
  - Jiayin Dinosaur National Geopark
  - Yichun Granite Stone Forest National Geopark
  - Jingpohu National Geopark
  - Xingkaihu National Geopark
  - Yichun Xiao Hinggan Ling National Geopark
  - Fenghuangshan National Geopark
  - Shankou Geopark
  - Mohe National Geopark
  - Qinggang Mammoth Geopark
  - Jiguanshan Geopark
- Shanghai
  - Chongmingdao National Geopark
- Jiangsu
  - Suzhou Taihu Xishan National Geopark
  - Luhe National Geopark
  - Jiangning Tangshan Fangshan National Geopark
  - Lianyungang Huaguoshan National Geopark
- Zhejiang
  - Changshan Golden Spike National Geopark
  - Linhai National Geopark
  - ~~Yandangshan National Geopark~~
  - ~~Xinchang Petrified Wood National Geopark~~
  - ~~Xianju Shenxianju Geopark~~
  - ~~Jinyun Xiandu Geopark~~
  - Fanshan National Geopark, Cangnan
- Anhui
  - Huangshan National Geopark
  - Qiyunshan National Geopark
  - Fushan National Geopark
  - Huainan Bagongshan National Geopark
  - Qimen Guniujiang National Geopark
  - Tianzhushan National Geopark
  - Dabieshan (Lu'an) National Geopark
  - Chizhou Jiuhuashan National Geopark
  - Fengyangshan National Geopark
  - Guangde Taijidong National Geopark
  - Yashan National Geopark
  - Lingbi Qingyunshan National Geopark
  - Fanchang Marenshan Geopark
  - Shitai Karst Caves Geopark
- Fujian
  - Coastal Volcanoes National Geopark, Zhangzhou
  - ~~Dajinhu National Geopark~~
  - Shenhuwan National Geopark, Jinjiang
  - ~~Fuding Taimushan National Geopark~~
  - Tian'edong Caves National Geopark, Ninghua
  - Shiniushan National Geopark, Dehua
  - ~~Pingnan Baishuiyang National Geopark~~
  - ~~Yong'an National Geopark~~
  - ~~Liancheng Guanzhishan National Geopark (locally pronounced Guanzhaishan)~~
  - ~~Baiyunshan National Geopark~~
  - ~~Pinghe Lingtongshan National Geopark~~
  - ~~Zhenghe Fozishan Geopark~~
  - Qingliu Hot Spring National Geopark
  - Sanming Jiaoye National Geopark
  - ~~Pingtan Geopark~~
  - Sandu'ao National Geopark, Ningde
  - Guantaishan Guyindong National Geopark, Shouning
- Jiangxi
  - Lushan Quaternary Glaciation National Geopark
  - Longhushan Danxia Landform National Geopark
  - Sanqingshan National Geopark
  - Wugongshan National Geopark
  - Shicheng National Geopark
- Shandong
  - ~~Shanwang National Geopark~~
  - ~~Zaozhuang Xiong'ershan National Geopark~~
  - ~~Dongying Huanghe Sanjiaozhou National Geopark~~
  - ~~Taishan National Geopark~~
  - Yimengshan National Geopark
  - ~~Changshan Liedao National Geopark~~
  - Zhucheng Dinosaur National Geopark
  - Qingzhou National Geopark
  - Laiyang Cretaceous National Geopark
  - ~~Yiyuan Lushan National Geopark~~
  - Changle Volcanism National Geopark
  - ~~Wulianshan - Jiuxianshan Geopark, Wulian~~
  - ~~Yishan Geopark, Zoucheng~~
- Henan
  - Songshan Stratigraphic Structure National Geopark
  - Jiaozuo Yuntaishan National Geopark
  - Neixiang Baotianman National Geopark
  - Wangwushan National Geopark
  - Xixia Funiushan National Geopark
  - Chayashan National Geopark
  - Zhengzhou Huanghe National Geopark
  - Guanshan National Geopark
  - Luoning Shenlingzhai National Geopark
  - Luoyang Daimeishan National Geopark
  - Xinyang Jingangtai National Geopark
  - Xiaoqinling National Geopark
  - Hongqiqu - Linlüshan National Geopark
  - Ruyang Dinosaur National Geopark
  - Yaoshan Geopark
- Hubei
  - Changjiang Sanxia National Geopark (trans-provincial NGP, shared with Chongqing)
  - Shennongjia National Geopark
  - Wuhan Mulanshan National Geopark
  - Yunxian Dinosaur-egg Fossil Coenosis National Geopark
  - Wudangshan National Geopark
  - Huanggang Dabieshan National Geopark
  - Wufeng National Geopark
  - Xianning Jiugongshan - Wenquan Geopark
  - Enshi Tenglongdong Daxiagu National Geopark
  - Changyang Qingjiang National Geopark
  - Yuan'an Fossil Coenosis Geopark
- Hunan
  - Zhangjiajie National Geopark
  - Chenzhou Feitianshan National Geopark
  - Langshan National Geopark
  - Fenghuang National Geopark
  - Guzhang Hongshilin National Geopark (Hongshilin: “Red Stone Forest”, formed by red carbonate rocks)
  - Jiubujiang National Geopark
  - Wulongshan National Geopark
  - Meijiang National Geopark
  - Pingjiang Shiniuzhai National Geopark
  - Liuyang Daweishan National Geopark
  - Tongdao Wanfoshan National Geopark
  - Anhua Xuefenghu Geopark
  - Yizhang Mangshan Geopark
  - Xinshao Baishuidong Geopark
- Guangdong
  - Danxiashan National Geopark
  - Zhanjiang Huguangyan National Geopark
  - Foshan Xiqiaoshan National Geopark
  - Yangchun Lingxiaoyan National Geopark
  - Shenzhen Dapeng Bandao National Geopark
  - Fengkai National Geopark
  - Enping Geotherm National Geopark
  - Yangshan National Geopark
  - Raoping Qinglan Geopark
- Guangxi
  - Ziyuan National Geopark
  - Bose Leye Dashiwei Karst Tiankeng Group National Geopark
  - Beihai Weizhoudao Volcano National Geopark
  - Fengshan Karst National Geopark
  - Luzhai Xiangqiao Karst National Geopark
  - Dahua Qibailong National Geopark
  - Guiping National Geopark
  - ~~Yizhou “Stone Forest above the Water” Geopark~~ (qualification cancelled on December 9, 2016)
  - Pubei Wuhuangshan National Geopark
  - Du'an Subterranean River National Geopark
  - Luocheng National Geopark
  - Donglan Geopark
- Hainan
  - Haikou Shishan Volcano Group National Geopark
  - Baisha Geopark
  - Shilu National Geopark
- Chongqing
  - Changjiang Sanxia National Geopark (trans-provincial NGP, shared with Hubei)
  - Wulong Karst National Geopark
  - Qianjiang Xiaonanhai National Geopark
  - Yunyang Longgang National Geopark (Longgang: literally mean Dragon Vat, a karst tiankeng)
  - Wansheng National Geopark
  - Qijiang National Geopark
  - Shizhu Qiyaoshan Geopark
  - Youyang Geopark
  - Yunyang Dinosaur Geopark
- Sichuan
  - Zigong Dinosaur & Paleo-organism National Geopark
  - Longmenshan Tectonics National Geopark
  - Hailuogou National Geopark
  - Daduhe Xiagu National Geopark
  - Anxian Bioherm National Geopark
  - Jiuzhaigou National Geopark
  - Huanglong National Geopark
  - Xingwen Shihai National Geopark (Shihai: literally mean Sea of Stone, a block field)
  - Shehong Petrified Wood National Geopark
  - Siguniangshan National Geopark
  - Huayingshan National Geopark
  - Jiangyou National Geopark
  - Dabashan National Geopark
  - Guangwushan - Nuoshuihe National Geopark
  - Qingchuan Earthquake Relics National Geopark
  - Mianzhu Qingping - Hanwang Geopark
  - Yanbian Gesala Geopark
  - Dagu Bingshan Geopark
  - Pingshan Ring-scarped Danxia Geopark
- Guizhou
  - Guanling Fossil Coenosis National Geopark
  - Xingyi National Geopark
  - Zhijindong National Geopark
  - Suiyang Shuanghedong National Geopark
  - Liupanshui Wumengshan National Geopark
  - Pingtang National Geopark
  - Qiandongnan Miaoling National Geopark
  - Sinan Wujiang Karst National Geopark
  - Chishui Danxia National Geopark
  - Ziyun Getuhe Geopark
- Yunnan
  - Shilin Pinnacle Karst National Geopark
  - Chengjiang Fauna & Paleo-organism National Geopark
  - Tengchong Volcano National Geopark (aka “Tengchong Volcano and Geotherm NGP”)
  - Lufeng Dinosaur National Geopark
  - Yulong Liming - Laojunshan National Geopark
  - Dali Cangshan National Geopark
  - Lijiang Yulong Xueshan Glacier National Geopark
  - Jiuxiang Canyon and Cavern National Geopark
  - Luoping Biota National Geopark
  - Luxi Alu National Geopark
  - Dongchuan Debris Flow Geopark
  - Weishan Hongheyuan Geopark
- Tibet
  - Yi'ong National Geopark
  - Zanda Earth Forest National Geopark
  - Yangbajain National Geopark
- Shaanxi
  - Cuihuashan Mountain Rockslide Geohazard National Geopark
  - Huanghe Hukou Pubu National Geopark (trans-provincial NGP, shared with Shanxi)
  - Luochuan Loess National Geopark
  - Yanchuan Yellow River Meander National Geopark
  - Shangnan Jinsixia National Geopark
  - Langao Nangongshan National Geopark
  - Zhashui Karst Cave National Geopark
  - Yaozhou Zhaojin Danxia Geopark
  - Hanzhong Liping National Geopark
  - Huashan Geopark
- Gansu
  - Dunhuang Yardang National Geopark
  - Liujiaxia Dinosaur National Geopark
  - Pingliang Kongtongshan National Geopark
  - Jingtai Huanghe Shilin National Geopark (Huanghe Shilin: "Yellow River Stone Forest")
  - Hezheng Paleo-organism Fossils National Geopark
  - Tianshui Maijishan National Geopark
  - Zhangye National Geopark
  - Bingling Danxia Geopark
  - Tanchang Guan'egou Geopark
  - Lintan Yeliguan Geopark
  - Pingshanhu Geopark, Ganzhou, Zhangye
  - Têwo Zhagana Geopark
- Qinghai
  - Jainca Kamra National Geopark
  - Jigzhi Nyainboyuzê National Geopark
  - Golmud Kunlunshan National Geopark
  - Huzhu Jiading National Geopark
  - Guide National Geopark
  - Qinghaihu Geopark
  - Maqên A'nyêmaqên Shan National Geopark
  - Tongde Shizang Danxia Geopark
- Ningxia
  - Xiji Huoshizhai National Geopark
  - ~~Lingwu Geopark~~ (qualification cancelled on December 9, 2016)
- Xinjiang
  - Burqin Kanas Hu National Geopark
  - Qitai Petrified Wood-Dinosaur National Geopark
  - Fuyun Koktokay National Geopark
  - Tianshan Tianchi National Geopark
  - Kuqa Grand Canyon National Geopark
  - Turpan Huoyanshan Geopark
  - Wensu Salt Dome Geopark
  - Jeminay Caoyuanshicheng Geopark
  - Hami Pterosaur-Yardang Geopark
  - Burqin Geopark
- Hong Kong
  - Hong Kong National Geopark

== ~~National Mining Parks of China~~ (disbanded) ==
- Number of NMPs (unit): 0 (87 before July 24, 2019)

Note: The former NMPs would either be incorporated into existing protected areas or redesignated as other categories of national-level nature parks. The work is still in progress.

== National Ecoparks of China ==
- Ratified by: State Forestry Administration
- Number of NEPs (unit): 18 (as at January 24, 2017)
- Area of NEPs (10,000 ha): TBV
- Hebei
  - Weichang Hulstai National Ecopark
- Inner Mongolia
  - Hondlon National Ecopark
  - Ordos National Ecopark
  - Zhuozi Hongshiya National Ecopark
- Jiangsu
  - Zhangjiagang Jiyanghu National Ecopark
  - Yancheng Longgang National Ecopark
- Zhejiang
  - Kaihua, National Ecopark of the East
- Anhui
  - Feixi Guanting National Ecopark
- Shandong
  - Gaotang Qingping National Ecopark
  - Zaozhuang Huancheng National Ecopark
- Henan
  - Qingfeng Yangzi National Ecopark
  - Nanle Huanghe Gudao National Ecopark
  - Minquan Huanghe Gudao National Ecopark
- Hubei
  - Suizhou Suichengshan National Ecopark
  - Baokang Yaozhihe National Ecopark
- Chongqing
  - Nanchuan Shanwangping Karst National Ecopark
- Guizhou
  - Daozhen Luolong National Ecopark
- Qinghai
  - Xining Huancheng National Ecopark

== National Forest Parks of China ==
- Ratified by: State Forestry and Grassland Administration
- Number of NFPs (unit): 864 (as at July 23, 2026), plus one national forest resort (as at July 6, 1994)
- Area of NFPs + NFR (10,000 ha): 1441.05 (as of 2017)
- Total Number of FPs (unit): 3,065 (as of 2024)
- Area of FPs (10,000 ha): 1907.93 (as of 2024)
- Beijing
  - Xishan National Forest Park
  - Shangfangshan National Forest Park
  - Shisanling National Forest Park
  - Yunmengshan National Forest Park
  - Xiaolongmen National Forest Park
  - Jiufeng National Forest Park
  - Daxing Ancient Mulberry National Forest Park
  - Dayangshan National Forest Park
  - Xiayunling National Forest Park
  - Huangsongyu National Forest Park
  - Beigong National Forest Park
  - Badaling National Forest Park
  - Qifengshan National Forest Park
  - Tianmenshan National Forest Park
  - Labagoumen National Forest Park
- Tianjin
  - Jiulongshan National Forest Park
- Hebei
  - Haibin National Forest Park
  - Saihanba National Forest Park
  - Qingchuifeng National Forest Park
  - Xiangyundao National Forest Park
  - ~~Shifo National Forest Park~~ (revoked on December 29, 2015)
  - Qingdongling National Forest Park
  - Liaoheyuan National Forest Park
  - Shanhaiguan National Forest Park
  - Wuyuezhai National Forest Park
  - Baicaowa National Forest Park
  - Tianshengqiao National Forest Park
  - Huangyangshan National Forest Park
  - Maojingba National Forest Park
  - Xiangtangshan National Forest Park
  - Yesanpo National Forest Park
  - Liuliping National Forest Park
  - Gubeiyue National Forest Park
  - Baishishan National Forest Park
  - Wu'an National Forest Park
  - Yizhou National Forest Park
  - Qiannanyu National Forest Park
  - Tuoliangshan National Forest Park
  - Mulan Weichang National Forest Park
  - Xiezigou National Forest Park
  - Xiantaishan National Forest Park
  - Fengning National Forest Park
  - Heilongshan National Forest Park
  - ~~Chengde Shihai National Forest Park~~ (revoked on August 20, 2010)
  - Daqingshan National Forest Park
  - Huailai National Forest Park
  - Bashang Guyuan National Forest Park
- Shanxi
  - Wutaishan National Forest Park
  - Tianlongshan National Forest Park
  - Guandishan National Forest Park
  - Guancenshan National Forest Park
  - Hengshan National Forest Park
  - Yungang National Forest Park
  - Longquan National Forest Park
  - Yuwangdong National Forest Park
  - Zhaogaoguan National Forest Park
  - Fangshan National Forest Park
  - Jiaochengshan National Forest Park
  - Taiyueshan National Forest Park
  - Wulaofeng National Forest Park
  - Laodingshan National Forest Park
  - Wujinshan National Forest Park
  - Zhongtiaoshan National Forest Park
  - Huangyadong National Forest Park
  - Taihang Xiagu National Forest Park
  - Qizishan National Forest Park
  - Taihang Honggu National Forest Park
  - Anze National Forest Park
  - Xiantangshan National Forest Park
  - Erlangshan National Forest Park
  - Xikou Gudao National Forest Park
  - Putishan National Forest Park
- Inner Mongolia
  - Hongshan National Forest Park
  - Qarsan National Forest Park
  - Hadamen National Forest Park
  - Hailar National Forest Park
  - Ul Shan National Forest Park
  - Ust National Forest Park
  - Ma'anshan National Forest Park
  - Ulastai National Forest Park
  - Xinglong National Forest Park
  - Arxan National Forest Park
  - Darbin Hu National Forest Park
  - Huanggangliang National Forest Park
  - Mordaga National Forest Park
  - Yikesama National Forest Park
  - Helanshan National Forest Park
  - Hoson Gou National Forest Park
  - Ejin Diversifolius Poplar National Forest Park
  - Wangyedian National Forest Park
  - Huamugou National Forest Park
  - Orqohan National Forest Park
  - Hinggan National Forest Park
  - Chaoyuan National Forest Park
  - Alihe National Forest Park
  - Wudang Ju National Forest Park
  - Honggolj Mongolian Scots Pine National Forest Park
  - Lamashan National Forest Park
  - Luanheyuan National Forest Park
  - Hetao National Forest Park
  - Bogd Ul National Forest Park
  - Longsheng National Forest Park
  - Cilechuan National Forest Park
  - Qinggis Han National Forest Park
  - Chaor Daxiagu National Forest Park
  - Tubl National Forest Park
  - Shenshan National Forest Park
  - Olon National Forest Park
- Liaoning
  - Lüshunkou National Forest Park
  - Haitangshan National Forest Park
  - Dagushan National Forest Park
  - Shoushan National Forest Park
  - Fenghuangshan National Forest Park
  - Huanren National Forest Park
  - Benxi National Forest Park
  - Yunshishan National Forest Park
  - ~~Tianqiaogou National Forest Park~~ (revoked on July 16, 2009)
  - Gaizhou National Forest Park
  - Yuanshuailin National Forest Park
  - Xianrendong National Forest Park
  - Dalian Daheshan National Forest Park
  - Changshan Qundao National Sea-island Forest Park
  - Pulandian National Forest Park
  - Daheishan National Forest Park
  - Shenyang National Forest Park
  - Jinlongsi National Forest Park
  - Benxi Huancheng National Forest Park
  - Binglashan National Forest Park
  - Houshi National Forest Park
  - Qianshan Xianrentai National Forest Park
  - Qingyuan Honghegu National Forest Park
  - Dalian Tianmenshan National Forest Park
  - Sankuaishi National Forest Park
  - Zhanggutai Sandland National Forest Park
  - Dalian Yinshitan National Forest Park
  - Dalian Xijiao National Forest Park
  - Yiwulüshan National Forest Park
  - Hemu National Forest Park
  - Suizhong Changcheng National Forest Park
  - Wafangdian National Forest Park
  - Tieling Qilinhu National Forest Park
- Jilin
  - Jingyuetan National Forest Park
  - Wunüfeng National Forest Park
  - Longwan Crater Lakes National Forest Park
  - Baijifeng National Forest Park
  - Mao'ershan National Forest Park
  - Banlashan National Forest Park
  - Sanxianjia National Forest Park
  - Da'an National Forest Park
  - Changbai National Forest Park
  - Linjiang National Forest Park
  - Lafashan National Forest Park
  - Tumenjiang National Forest Park
  - Zhuqueshan National Forest Park
  - Tumenjiangyuan National Forest Park
  - Yanbian Xianfeng National Forest Park
  - Guanma Lianhuashan National Forest Park
  - Zhaodajishan National Forest Park
  - Hancongding National Forest Park
  - Mantianxing National Forest Park
  - Diaoshuihu National Forest Park
  - Lushuihe National Forest Park
  - Tonghua Shihu National Forest Park
  - Hongshi National Forest Park
  - Jiangyuan National Forest Park
  - Jiguanshan National Forest Park
  - Quanyangquan National Forest Park
  - Baishishan National Forest Park
  - Songjianghe National Forest Park
  - Sanchazi National Forest Park
  - Linjiang Cascades National Forest Park
  - Wangou National Forest Park
  - Lanjia Daxiagu National Forest Park
  - Changbaishan Beipo National Forest Park
  - Hongyeling National Forest Park
  - Longshanhu National Forest Park
  - Baishan City National Forest Resort
- Heilongjiang
  - Mudanfeng National Forest Park
  - Huoshankou National Forest Park
  - Daliangzihe National Forest Park
  - Wulong National Forest Park
  - Harbin National Forest Park
  - Jiejinshan National Forest Park
  - Qiqihar National Forest Park
  - Beijicun National Forest Park
  - Changshou National Forest Park
  - Daqing National Forest Park
  - Weihushan National Forest Park
  - Wuying National Forest Park
  - Yabuli National Forest Park
  - Yimianpo National Forest Park
  - Longfeng National Forest Park
  - Jinquan National Forest Park
  - Wusulijiang National Forest Park
  - Taoshan National Forest Park
  - Yimashan National Forest Park
  - Sandaoguan National Forest Park
  - Suifenhe National Forest Park
  - Riyuexia National Forest Park
  - Xinglong National Forest Park
  - Wumahe National Forest Park
  - Fenghuangshan National Forest Park
  - Xuexiang National Forest Park
  - Baliwan National Forest Park
  - Wudingshan National Forest Park
  - Longjiang Sanxia National Forest Park
  - Maolangou National Forest Park
  - Hegang National Forest Park
  - Qingshan National Forest Park
  - Dazhanhe National Forest Park
  - Huilongwan National Forest Park
  - Danqinghe National Forest Park
  - Shilongshan National Forest Park
  - Boli Wusihunhe National Forest Park
  - Xishui National Forest Park
  - Fangzheng Longshan National Forest Park
  - Jingpohu National Forest Park
  - Jinshan National Forest Park
  - Jiapigou National Forest Park
  - Xiao Hinggan Ling Shilin National Forest Park
  - Liufengshan National Forest Park
  - Wanglongshan National Forest Park
  - Shengshan Yaosai National Forest Park
  - Wudalianchi National Forest Park
  - Wandashan National Forest Park
  - Zhenbaodao National Forest Park
  - Yichun Hinggan National Forest Park
  - Huzhong National Forest Park
  - Hongsonglin National Forest Park
  - Qixingfeng National Forest Park
  - Jinlongshan National Forest Park
  - Xianwengshan National Forest Park
  - Jagdaqi National Forest Park
  - Hulan National Forest Park
  - Changshoushan National Forest Park
  - Huachuan National Forest Park
  - Shuangzishan National Forest Park
  - Xianglushan National Forest Park
  - Daqingguan National Forest Park
  - Xiao Hinggan Ling Korean Pine National Forest Park
  - Huaxiadongji National Forest Park
  - Shendongshan National Forest Park
  - Qixingshan National Forest Park
  - Dale National Forest Park
  - Nianzishan National Forest Park
  - Zhalinkur National Forest Park
  - Tianshi National Forest Park
  - Hailun National Forest Park
- Shanghai
  - Sheshan National Forest Park
  - Dongping National Forest Park
  - Shanghai Haiwan National Forest Park
  - Shanghai Gongqing National Forest Park
- Jiangsu
  - Yushan National Forest Park
  - Shangfangshan National Forest Park
  - Xuzhou Huancheng National Forest Park
  - Yixing National Forest Park
  - Huishan National Forest Park
  - Dongwu National Forest Park
  - Yuntaishan National Forest Park
  - Xuyi Diyishan National Forest Park
  - Nanshan National Forest Park
  - Baohuashan National Forest Park
  - Xishan National Forest Park
  - Nanjing Zijinshan National Forest Park
  - Tieshansi National Forest Park
  - Dayangshan National Forest Park
  - Nanjing Qixiashan National Forest Park
  - Youzishan National Forest Park
  - Nanjing Laoshan National Forest Park
  - Tianmuhu National Forest Park
  - Nanjing Wuxiangshan National Forest Park
  - Huanghai Haibin National Forest Park
  - Santaishan National Forest Park
  - Nantong Langshan National Forest Park
- Zhejiang
  - ~~Qiandaohu National Forest Park~~
  - ~~Daqishan National Forest Park~~
  - Lanting National Forest Park
  - Wuchaoshan National Forest Park
  - Wulongshan National Forest Park (renamed, orig. Fuchunjiang NFP)
  - Anji Zhuxiang National Forest Park
  - Tiantong National Forest Park
  - ~~Yandangshan National Forest Park~~
  - ~~Xikou National Forest Park~~
  - Pinghu Jiulongshan National Forest Park
  - ~~Shuanglongdong National Forest Park~~
  - Huading National Forest Park
  - Qingshanhu National Forest Park
  - Yucangshan National Forest Park
  - ~~Qianjiangyuan National Forest Park~~
  - Ziweishan National Forest Park
  - Tonglingshan National Forest Park
  - Huayan Fuquanshan National Forest Park (renamed, orig. Huayan NFP)
  - ~~Longwantan National Forest Park~~
  - Suichang National Forest Park
  - ~~Wuxie National Forest Park~~
  - Shuangfeng Nanxi National Forest Park
  - Shimendong National Forest Park
  - Simingshan National Forest Park
  - ~~Xianxia National Forest Park~~
  - ~~Daxi National Forest Park~~
  - Maoshan National Forest Park, Songyang
  - Wuyi Niutoushan National Forest Park
  - ~~Sanqu National Forest Park~~
  - Jingshan Shangougou National Forest Park
  - Nanshanhu National Forest Park
  - Liuchunhu National Forest Park (renamed, orig. Dazhuhai NFP)
  - ~~Xianju National Forest Park~~
  - ~~Tonglu Yaolin National Forest Park~~
  - Zhuji Grand Torreya National Forest Park
  - Banshan National Forest Park, Hangzhou
  - Qingyuan National Forest Park
  - Xishan National Forest Park, Hangzhou
  - Liangxi National Forest Park
  - Lishui Baiyun National Forest Park
  - Linhai Kuocangshan National Forest Park
  - Kuaijishan National Forest Park, Shaoxing
  - Shexiang Caoyutang National Forest Park
  - Dongyang Nanshan National Forest Park
- Anhui
  - Huangshan National Forest Park
  - Langyashan National Forest Park
  - Tianzhushan National Forest Park
  - Jiuhuashan National Forest Park
  - Huangcangyu National Forest Park
  - Huizhou National Forest Park
  - Dalongshan National Forest Park
  - Zipengshan National Forest Park
  - Huangfushan National Forest Park
  - Tiantangzhai National Forest Park
  - Jilongshan National Forest Park
  - Yefushan National Forest Park
  - Taihushan National Forest Park
  - Shenshan National Forest Park
  - Miaodaoshan National Forest Park
  - Tianjingshan National Forest Park
  - Shungengshan National Forest Park
  - Fushan National Forest Park
  - Shiliandong National Forest Park
  - Qiyunshan National Forest Park
  - Jiushan National Forest Park
  - Hengshan National Forest Park
  - Jingtingshan National Forest Park
  - Bagongshan National Forest Park
  - Wanfoshan National Forest Park
  - Qinglongwan National Forest Park
  - Shuixi National Forest Park
  - Shangyao National Forest Park
  - Marenshan National Forest Park
  - Hefei Dashushan National Forest Park
  - Hefei Binhu National Forest Park
  - Tachuan National Forest Park
  - Laojiashan National Forest Park
  - Majiaxi National Forest Park
  - Xiangshan National Forest Park
- Fujian
  - Fuzhou National Forest Park
  - Tianzhushan National Forest Park
  - ~~Pingtan Haidao National Forest Park~~
  - Hua'an National Forest Park
  - ~~Mao'ershan National Forest Park~~
  - Longyan National Forest Park
  - Qishan National Forest Park
  - Sanyuan National Forest Park
  - Lingshishan National Forest Park
  - Dongshan National Forest Park
  - ~~Jiangle Tianjieshan National Forest Park~~
  - ~~Dehua Shiniushan National Forest Park~~
  - Lianhua National Forest Park, Xiamen
  - Xianrengu National Forest Park, Sanming
  - Shanghang National Forest Park
  - ~~Wuyishan National Forest Park~~
  - Wushan National Forest Park
  - Tiantai National Forest Park, Zhangping
  - Wangshoushan National Forest Park
  - Jiulonggu National Forest Park
  - Zhitishan National Forest Park
  - Tianxingshan National Forest Park
  - Minjiangyuan National Forest Park
  - Jiulong Zhuhai National Forest Park
  - Changle National Forest Park
  - Kuangshan National Forest Park
  - ~~Longhushan National Forest Park~~ (revoked on December 29, 2015)
  - Nanjing Tulou National Forest Park
  - ~~Wuyi Tianchi National Forest Park~~
  - Wuhushan National Forest Park
  - Yangmeizhou Xiagu National Forest Park
  - Wujunshan National Forest Park (redesignated, orig. Wujunshan PSHA)
- Jiangxi
  - Sanzhualun National Forest Park
  - Lushan Shannan National Forest Park
  - Meiling National Forest Park
  - Sanbaishan National Forest Park
  - Mazushan National Forest Park
  - Poyanghukou National Forest Park
  - Lingyandong National Forest Park
  - Mingyueshan National Forest Park
  - Cuiweifeng National Forest Park
  - Tianzhufeng National Forest Park
  - Taihe National Forest Park
  - Ehushan National Forest Park
  - Guifeng National Forest Park
  - Shangqing National Forest Park
  - Meiguan National Forest Park
  - Yongfeng National Forest Park
  - Gezaoshan National Forest Park
  - Sandiequan National Forest Park
  - Wugongshan National Forest Park
  - Tongboshan National Forest Park
  - Yangmingshan National Forest Park
  - Tianhuajing National Forest Park
  - Wuzhifeng National Forest Park
  - Zhelinhu National Forest Park
  - Ganzhou Yangminghu National Forest Park
  - Wan'an National Forest Park
  - Sanwan National Forest Park
  - Anyuan National Forest Park
  - Jiulianshan National Forest Park
  - Yanquan National Forest Park
  - Yunbifeng National Forest Park
  - Jingdezhen National Forest Park
  - Yaoli National Forest Park
  - Fengshan National Forest Park
  - Qingliangshan National Forest Park
  - Jiulingshan National Forest Park
  - Censhan National Forest Park
  - Wufushan National Forest Park
  - Junfengshan National Forest Park
  - Bihutan National Forest Park
  - Huaiyushan National Forest Park
  - Yangtiangang National Forest Park
  - Shengshuitang National Forest Park
  - Poyang Lianhuashan National Forest Park
  - Pengze National Forest Park
  - Jinpenshan National Forest Park
  - Guixi National Forest Park
  - Huichangshan National Forest Park
  - Luoxiaoshan Daxiagu National Forest Park
  - Hongyan National Forest Park
- Shandong
  - ~~Laoshan National Forest Park~~
  - ~~Baodugu National Forest Park~~
  - ~~Huanghekou National Forest Park~~
  - ~~Kunyushan National Forest Park~~
  - ~~Luoshan National Forest Park~~
  - ~~Changdao National Forest Park~~
  - ~~Yishan National Forest Park~~
  - Nishan National Forest Park
  - ~~Taishan National Forest Park~~
  - ~~Culaishan National Forest Park~~
  - Rizhao Haibin National Forest Park
  - Hebanshan National Forest Park
  - Menglianggu National Forest Park
  - ~~Liubu National Forest Park~~
  - ~~Liugongdao National Forest Park~~
  - ~~Chashan National Forest Park~~
  - Yaoxiang National Forest Park
  - Yuanshan National Forest Park
  - Lingshanwan National Forest Park
  - ~~Shuangdao National Forest Park~~
  - Mengshan National Forest Park
  - ~~Lashan National Forest Park~~
  - ~~Yangtianshan National Forest Park~~
  - Weideshan National Forest Park
  - ~~Zhushan National Forest Park~~
  - Juyushan National Forest Park
  - Niushan National Forest Park
  - ~~Lushan National Forest Park~~
  - ~~Wulianshan National Forest Park~~
  - Huashan National Forest Park, Laiwu
  - ~~Aishan National Forest Park~~
  - ~~Longkou Nanshan National Forest Park~~
  - Xintai Lianhuashan National Forest Park
  - ~~Zhaohushan National Forest Park~~
  - ~~Yashan National Forest Park~~
  - Shouyangshan National Forest Park
  - Liaocheng Huanghe National Forest Park
  - Tanxishan National Forest Park (renamed, orig. Ezhuang Ancient Village NFP)
  - Shibapan National Forest Park (renamed, orig. Yishan NFP)
  - Mozi National Forest Park, Tengzhou
  - Mizhou National Forest Park
  - Wulongshan National Forest Park, (renamed, orig. Liushan Paleovolcano NFP)
  - Quanlin National Forest Park
  - Zhangqiu National Forest Park
  - ~~Yicheng Ancient Pomegranate National Forest Park~~
  - Qishanyouxia National Forest Park
  - Xiajin Huanghe Gudao National Forest Park
  - ~~Chiping National Forest Park~~
  - Panlongshan National Forest Park
- Henan
  - Songshan National Forest Park
  - Sishan National Forest Park
  - Ruzhou National Forest Park
  - Shimantan National Forest Park
  - Boshan National Forest Park
  - Kaifeng National Forest Park
  - Yawushan National Forest Park
  - Huaguoshan National Forest Park
  - Yuntaishan National Forest Park
  - Baiyunshan National Forest Park
  - Longyuwan National Forest Park
  - Wulongdong National Forest Park
  - Nanwan National Forest Park
  - Ganshan National Forest Park
  - Huaiheyuan National Forest Park
  - Shenlingzhai National Forest Park
  - Tongshanhu National Forest Park
  - Huanghe Gudao National Forest Park
  - Yushan National Forest Park
  - Jinlanshan National Forest Park
  - Yuhuangshan National Forest Park
  - Chayashan National Forest Park
  - Tianchishan National Forest Park
  - Shizushan National Forest Park
  - Huangbaishan National Forest Park
  - Yanzishan National Forest Park
  - Tangxiyuan National Forest Park
  - Dahongzhai National Forest Park
  - Tianmushan National Forest Park, Xinyang
  - Dasushan National Forest Park
  - Yunmengshan National Forest Park
  - Jindingshan National Forest Park
  - Songding National Forest Park
- Hubei
  - Jiufeng National Forest Park
  - Lumensi National Forest Park
  - Yuquansi National Forest Park
  - Dalaoling National Forest Park
  - Shennongjia National Forest Park
  - Longmenhe National Forest Park
  - Xieshan National Forest Park
  - Dakou National Forest Park
  - Qingjiang National Forest Park
  - Dabieshan National Forest Park
  - Chaibuxi National Forest Park
  - Qianshan National Forest Park
  - Balingshan National Forest Park
  - Weishui National Forest Park
  - Taizishan National Forest Park
  - Sanjiaoshan National Forest Park
  - Zhonghuashan National Forest Park
  - Hong'an Tiantaishan National Forest Park
  - Pingbaying National Forest Park
  - Wujiashan National Forest Park
  - Shuangfengshan National Forest Park
  - Qianfodong National Forest Park
  - Dahongshan National Forest Park
  - Huzhuashan National Forest Park
  - Wu'naoshan National Forest Park
  - Canglangshan National Forest Park
  - Anlu Ancient Ginkgo National Forest Park
  - Niutoushan National Forest Park
  - Sijingyuan National Forest Park
  - Jiunüfeng National Forest Park
  - Piantoushan National Forest Park
  - Danjiangkou National Forest Park
  - Chongyang National Forest Park
  - Hanjiang Waterfalls National Forest Park
  - Xisaiguo National Forest Park
  - Xianshan National Forest Park
  - Baizhuyuansi National Forest Park
  - Badong National Forest Park
- Hunan
  - Zhangjiajie National Forest Park
  - Shennonggu National Forest Park
  - Mangshan National Forest Park
  - Daweishan National Forest Park
  - Yunshan National Forest Park
  - Jiuyishan National Forest Park
  - Yangmingshan National Forest Park
  - Nanhuashan National Forest Park
  - Huangshantou National Forest Park
  - Taohuayuan National Forest Park
  - Tianmenshan National Forest Park
  - Tianjiling National Forest Park
  - Tian'eshan National Forest Park
  - Shunhuangshan National Forest Park, Dong'an
  - Dongtaishan National Forest Park
  - Jiashansi National Forest Park
  - Bu'ermen National Forest Park
  - Hefu National Forest Park
  - Gouloufeng National Forest Park
  - Dayunshan National Forest Park
  - Huayanxi National Forest Park
  - Daxiongshan National Forest Park
  - Zhongpo National Forest Park
  - Yunyang National Forest Park
  - Jindong National Forest Park
  - Mufushan National Forest Park
  - Baili Longshan National Forest Park
  - Qianjiadong National Forest Park
  - Liangjiang Xiagu National Forest Park
  - Xuefengshan National Forest Park
  - Wujianshan National Forest Park
  - Taohuajiang National Forest Park
  - Xiangjiangyuan National Forest Park
  - Yueyan National Forest Park
  - Fengluanxi National Forest Park
  - Zhexi National Forest Park
  - Tiantangshan National Forest Park
  - Ningxiang Xiangshan National Forest Park
  - Jiulongjiang National Forest Park
  - Songyunshan National Forest Park
  - Tianquanshan National Forest Park
  - Xiyao Lügu National Forest Park
  - ~~Qingyanghu National Forest Park~~ (revoked on April 10, 2018)
  - Xiongfengshan National Forest Park
  - Nuoxi National Forest Park
  - Fuyinshan National Forest Park
  - Zuolongxia National Forest Park
  - Changsha Heimifeng National Forest Park
  - Youzhou National Forest Park
  - Aizhai National Forest Park
  - Jiashan National Forest Park
  - Yongxing Danxia National Forest Park
  - Qiyunfeng National Forest Park
  - Simingshan National Forest Park
  - Beiluoxiao National Forest Park
  - Jingzhou National Forest Park
  - Jiahe National Forest Park
  - Yuanling National Forest Park
  - Xupu National Forest Park
  - Hanshou Zhuhai National Forest Park
  - Xuanzhou National Forest Park
  - Qishan National Forest Park
  - Taibaifeng National Forest Park
  - Tengyunling National Forest Park
- Guangdong
  - Wutongshan National Forest Park
  - ~~Wanyou National Forest Park~~ (revoked on November 9, 2010)
  - Xiaokeng National Forest Park
  - Nan'ao Haidao National Forest Park
  - Nanling National Forest Park
  - Xinfengjiang National Forest Park
  - Shaoguan National Forest Park
  - ~~Donghaidao National Forest Park~~ (revoked on December 29, 2015)
  - Liuxihe National Forest Park
  - Nankunshan National Forest Park
  - Xiqiaoshan National Forest Park
  - Shimen National Forest Park
  - Guifengshan National Forest Park
  - Yingde National Forest Park
  - Guangning Zhuhai National Forest Park
  - Beifengshan National Forest Park
  - Daiwangshan National Forest Park
  - Shenguangshan National Forest Park
  - Guanyinshan National Forest Park
  - Lianghua National Forest Park
  - Sanlingshan National Forest Park
  - Yanminghu National Forest Park
  - Tianjingshan National Forest Park
  - Dabeishan National Forest Park
  - Zhenshan National Forest Park
  - Nantaishan National Forest Park
  - Kanghe Wenquan National Forest Park
  - Yinnashan National Forest Park
  - Zhongshan National Forest Park
  - Yunyong National Forest Park
- Guangxi
  - Guilin National Forest Park
  - Liangfengjiang National Forest Park
  - Sanmenjiang National Forest Park
  - Longtan National Forest Park
  - Daguishan National Forest Park
  - Yuanbaoshan National Forest Park
  - Bajiaozhai National Forest Park
  - Shiwandashan National Forest Park
  - Longsheng Wenquan National Forest Park
  - Guposhan National Forest Park
  - Dayaoshan National Forest Park
  - Huangjingdong Tiankeng National Forest Park
  - Feilonghu National Forest Park
  - Taiping Shishan National Forest Park
  - Darongshan National Forest Park
  - Yangshuo National Forest Park
  - Jiulong Cascades National Forest Park
  - Pingtianshan National Forest Park
  - Hongchagou National Forest Park
  - Longtan Daxiagu National Forest Park
  - Shizishan National Forest Park
  - Longxiashan National Forest Park
  - Fengshan Gendan National Forest Park
- Hainan
  - Jianfengling National Forest Park
  - Lanyang Wenquan National Forest Park
  - Diaoluoshan National Forest Park
  - Haikou Huoshan National Forest Park
  - Qixianling Wenquan National Forest Park
  - Limushan National Forest Park
  - Haishang National Forest Park
  - Bawangling National Forest Park
  - Xinglong Qiaoxiang National Forest Park
- Chongqing
  - Shuangguishan National Forest Park
  - Xiaosanxia National Forest Park
  - Jinfoshan National Forest Park
  - Huangshui National Forest Park
  - Xiannüshan National Forest Park
  - Maoyunshan National Forest Park
  - Wulingshan National Forest Park
  - Qinglonghu National Forest Park
  - Qianjiang National Forest Park
  - Liangping Dongshan National Forest Park
  - Qiaokouba National Forest Park
  - Tiefengshan National Forest Park
  - Hongchiba National Forest Park
  - Xuebaoshan National Forest Park
  - Yulongshan National Forest Park
  - Heishan National Forest Park
  - Geleshan National Forest Park
  - Chashan Zhuhai National Forest Park
  - Jiuchongshan National Forest Park
  - Dayuandong National Forest Park
  - Chongqing Nanshan National Forest Park
  - Guanyinxia National Forest Park
  - Tianchishan National Forest Park
  - Youyang Taohuayuan National Forest Park
  - Bargai National Forest Park
  - Yuqingshan National Forest Park
- Sichuan
  - Dujiangyan National Forest Park
  - Jianmenguan National Forest Park
  - Wawushan National Forest Park
  - Gaoshan National Forest Park
  - Xiling National Forest Park
  - Ertan National Forest Park
  - Hailuogou National Forest Park
  - Qiqushan National Forest Park
  - Jiuzhai National Forest Park
  - Tiantaishan National Forest Park
  - Fubao National Forest Park
  - Heizhugou National Forest Park
  - Jiajinshan National Forest Park
  - Longcanggou National Forest Park
  - Meinüfeng National Forest Park
  - Longmenshan National Forest Park
  - Huayingshan National Forest Park
  - Wufengshan National Forest Park
  - Qianfoshan National Forest Park
  - Copu National Forest Park
  - Micangshan National Forest Park
  - Erlangshan National Forest Park
  - Tianzhaoshan National Forest Park
  - Zhenlongshan National Forest Park
  - Yaksha National Forest Park
  - Tianmashan National Forest Park
  - Kongshan National Forest Park
  - Yunhu National Forest Park
  - Tieshan National Forest Park
  - Hehuahai National Forest Park
  - Lingyunshan National Forest Park
  - Beichuan National Forest Park
  - Langzhong National Forest Park
  - Xuanhan National Forest Park
  - Cangxi National Forest Park
  - Muchuan National Forest Park
  - Jiguanshan National Forest Park
  - Xianshuihe Daxiagu National Forest Park
  - Shalulishan National Forest Park
  - Jinchuan National Forest Park
  - Huangjinglaolin National Forest Park
  - Peng'an National Forest Park
  - Taipengshan National Forest Park
  - Congrengu National Forest Park
- Guizhou
  - Baili Dujuan National Forest Park
  - Zhuhai National Forest Park
  - Jiulongshan National Forest Park
  - Fenghuangshan National Forest Park
  - Changpoling National Forest Park
  - Yaorenshan National Forest Park
  - Yanziyan National Forest Park
  - Yushe National Forest Park
  - Leigongshan National Forest Park
  - Xishui National Forest Park
  - Liping National Forest Park
  - Zhujiashan National Forest Park
  - Zilinshan National Forest Park
  - Wuyanghu National Forest Park
  - Hezhang Yelang National Forest Park
  - Xianheping National Forest Park
  - Qingyunhu National Forest Park
  - Bijie National Forest Park
  - Dabanshui National Forest Park
  - Longjiashan National Forest Park
  - Jiudaoshui National Forest Park
  - Taijiang National Forest Park
  - Ganxi National Forest Park
  - Youshanhe Daxiagu National Forest Park
  - Huangguoshupubuyuan National Forest Park
  - Yang'asha National Forest Park
  - Fuquan National Forest Park
  - Jinsha Lengshuihe National Forest Park
- Yunnan
  - Weibaoshan National Forest Park
  - Tianxing National Forest Park
  - Qinghuadong National Forest Park
  - Dongshan National Forest Park
  - Laifengshan National Forest Park
  - Huayudong National Forest Park
  - Mopanshan National Forest Park
  - Longquan National Forest Park
  - Taiyanghe National Forest Park
  - Jindian National Forest Park
  - Zhangfeng National Forest Park
  - Shibalianshan National Forest Park
  - Lubuge National Forest Park
  - Zhujiangyuan National Forest Park
  - Wufengshan National Forest Park
  - Zhonglingshan National Forest Park
  - Qipanshan National Forest Park
  - Lingbaoshan National Forest Park
  - ~~Xiaobailong National Forest Park~~ (revoked on March 9, 2015)
  - Wulaoshan National Forest Park
  - Tongluoba National Forest Park
  - Zijinshan National Forest Park
  - Feilaisi National Forest Park
  - Guishan National Forest Park
  - Xinshengqiao National Forest Park
  - Xishuangbanna National Forest Park
  - Baotaishan National Forest Park
  - Shuangjiang Ancient Tea Hill National Forest Park
  - Lancang National Forest Park
  - Yongren Jinshajiang National Forest Park
  - Bojijin National Forest Park
  - Mojiang National Forest Park
  - Guanyinshan National Forest Park
  - Yunlong National Forest Park
- Tibet
  - Pagsum Hu National Forest Park
  - Sêrkyimla National Forest Park
  - Kangrinboqê National Forest Park
  - Banggong Hu National Forest Park
  - Ra'og Hu National Forest Park
  - Razhêng National Forest Park
  - Jêdêxoi National Forest Park
  - Nyêmo National Forest Park
  - Biri Shenshan National Forest Park
- Shaanxi
  - Taibaishan National Forest Park
  - Yan'an National Forest Park
  - Louguantai National Forest Park
  - Zhongnanshan National Forest Park
  - Jialingjiangyuan National Forest Park
  - Tianhuashan National Forest Park
  - Zhuque National Forest Park
  - Nangongshan National Forest Park
  - Wangshunshan National Forest Park
  - Wulongdong National Forest Park
  - Lishan National Forest Park
  - Hanzhong Tiantai National Forest Park
  - Jinsi Daxiagu National Forest Park
  - Tongtianhe National Forest Park
  - Liping National Forest Park
  - Muwang National Forest Park
  - Yulin Shamo National Forest Park
  - Laoshan National Forest Park
  - Taiping National Forest Park
  - Guiguling National Forest Park
  - Yuhuagong National Forest Park
  - Qianjiaping National Forest Park
  - Mangtoushan National Forest Park
  - Shangbahe National Forest Park
  - Heihe National Forest Park
  - Hongqingshan National Forest Park
  - Niubeiliang National Forest Park
  - Tianzhushan National Forest Park
  - Zibaishan National Forest Park
  - Shaohuashan National Forest Park
  - Shimenshan National Forest Park
  - Huangling National Forest Park
  - Qingfengxia National Forest Park
  - Huanglongshan National Forest Park
  - Hanyin Fenghuangshan National Forest Park
  - Ziwuling National Forest Park
  - Wudishan National Forest Park
- Gansu
  - Tulugou National Forest Park
  - Shifogou National Forest Park
  - Songmingyan National Forest Park
  - Yunyasi National Forest Park
  - Xujiashan National Forest Park
  - Guiqingshan National Forest Park
  - Maiji National Forest Park
  - Jifengshan National Forest Park
  - Weiheyuan National Forest Park
  - Tianzhu Sanxia National Forest Park
  - Yeliguan National Forest Park
  - Shatan National Forest Park
  - Guan'egou National Forest Park
  - Dayu National Forest Park
  - Lazikou National Forest Park
  - Wenxian Tianchi National Forest Park
  - Lianhuashan National Forest Park
  - Shoulushan National Forest Park
  - Zhouzuling National Forest Park
  - Xiaolongshan National Forest Park
  - Daxiagou National Forest Park
  - Ziwuling National Forest Park
- Qinghai
  - Kamra National Forest Park
  - Beishan National Forest Park
  - Datong National Forest Park
  - Qunjia National Forest Park
  - Xianmi National Forest Park
  - Maixiu National Forest Park
  - Harhd National Forest Park
- Ningxia
  - Helanshan National Forest Park
  - Liupanshan National Forest Park
  - Huamasi National Forest Park
  - Huoshizhai National Forest Park
- Xinjiang
  - Tianshan Daxiagu National Forest Park
  - Tianchi National Forest Park
  - Narat National Forest Park
  - Künes National Forest Park
  - Jadeng Yu National Forest Park
  - Bai Kaba National Forest Park
  - Tanbula National Forest Park
  - Janbulag National Forest Park
  - Kosan Rongdong National Forest Park
  - Jinhuyang National Forest Park
  - Gongliu Qaxi National Forest Park
  - Hami Tianshan National Forest Park
  - Har Tulag National Forest Park
  - Usu Foshan National Forest Park
  - Habahe White Birch National Forest Park
  - Altai Shan Wenquan National Forest Park
  - Xat Gudao National Forest Park
  - Taxihe National Forest Park
  - Bachu Euphrates Poplar National Forest Park
  - Ürümqi Tianshan National Forest Park
  - Jushi Gudao National Forest Park
  - Baishifeng National Forest Park
  - Lujiaowan National Forest Park
  - Guozigou National Forest Park

== National Wood (Flower) Parks of China ==
- Ratified by: State Forestry Administration
- Number of NW/FPs (unit): 17 (as at January 25, 2018)
- Hebei
  - Xingtang National Red Date Park
  - Qianxi National Chinese Chestnut Park
  - Jingxing Canglongshan National Weeping Forsythia Park
- Shanxi
  - Jishan National Chinese Chestnut Park
- Jiangsu
  - Pizhou National Ginkgo Expo Park
  - Taixing National Ancient Ginkgo Park
- Zhejiang
  - Changshan National Tea-Oil Camellia Park
- Anhui
  - Wuhu Yashan National Peony Park
  - Huaibei Lieshan National Pomegranate Park
- Shandong
  - Tancheng National Ginkgo Park
- Henan
  - Luoyang National Peony Park
  - Yanling National Ornamental Plants Expo Park
  - Xinzheng National Ancient Jujube Grove Park
- Sichuan
  - Jiangyou National Lily Park
  - Mianzhu National Rose Park
- Guizhou
  - Shuicheng National Azalea Park
- Yunnan
  - Ruili National Noble Dendrobium Park

== State Key Parks of China ==
- Ratified by: Ministry of Housing and Urban-Rural Development
- Number of SKPs (unit): 63 (as at December 17, 2010)
- Total Number of Public Parks (unit): 11,604 (as of 2012)
- Area of Public Parks (10,000 ha): 30.6245 (as of 2012)
- Beijing
  - Summer Palace
  - Tiantan Park
  - Beihai Park
  - Beijing Zoo
  - Beijing Botanical Garden
  - Zhongshan Park
  - Jingshan Park
  - Xiangshan Park
  - Zizhuyuan Park
  - Taoranting Park
- Hebei
  - Congtai Park, Handan
- Shanxi
  - Jiangshou Juyuanchi Park, Xinjiang (Jiangshou Juyuanchi: Site of “Residential Water Garden attached to Jiangzhou Prefecture Office”, Sui dynasty, a provincially protected monument and site)
  - Beilin Park, Taiyuan (alt. Stele Grove Park)
- Liaoning
  - Dongling Park, Shenyang
  - Beiling Park, Shenyang
- Jilin
  - Changchun World Sculpture Park
- Jiangsu
  - Humble Administrator's Garden, Suzhou
  - Lingering Garden, Suzhou
  - Master of the Nets Garden, Suzhou
  - Mountain Villa with Embracing Beauty, Suzhou
  - Lion Grove Garden, Suzhou
  - Garden of Cultivation, Suzhou
  - Garden of Couple's Retreat, Suzhou
  - Retreat and Reflection Garden, Suzhou
  - Blue Wave Pavilion, Suzhou
  - Ge Garden, Yangzhou
  - He Garden, Yangzhou
  - Huqiu Hill, Suzhou
  - Shouxihu Park, Yangzhou (Slender West Lake)
  - Hongmei Park, Changzhou
  - Xuanwuhu Park, Nanjing (Xuanwu Lake)
  - Meiyuan Garden, Wuxi
  - Xihui Park, Wuxi
  - Jinshan Park, Zhenjiang (Jinshan Hill)
- Zhejiang
  - Fushan Park, Quzhou
  - Lianhuazhuang Park, Huzhou
- Anhui
  - City Ring Park, Hefei
- Fujian
  - Xiamen Botanical Garden
  - Xiamen Horticulture Expo Garden
  - Zhongshan Park, Xiamen
  - Luoxingta Park, Fuzhou (Luoxing Pagoda)
  - Donghu Park, Quanzhou (East Lake)
  - Bailuzhou Park, Xiamen
- Jiangxi
  - Nanhu Park, Jiujiang (South Lake)
- Shandong
  - Baotuquan Park, Jinan
  - Daming Lake, Jinan
- Henan
  - Bishagang Park, Zhengzhou
  - Renmin Park, Zhengzhou (alt. People's Park)
- Hubei
  - Zhongshan Park, Wuhan
  - Huanghelou Park, Wuhan
  - Jiefang Park, Wuhan (alt. Liberation Park)
- Hunan
  - Hunan Martyr's Park, Changsha
- Guangdong
  - Yuexiu Park, Guangzhou
  - Xianhu Botanical Garden, Shenzhen
  - Shenzhen International Garden and Flower Expo Park
  - Lianhuashan Park (Lianhua Hill)
- Guangxi
  - Marquis Liu Park, Liuzhou
  - Longtan Park, Liuzhou
- Chongqing
  - Nanshan Botanical Garden
  - Eling Park
  - Chongqing Zoo
- Shaanxi
  - Yan Emperor Garden, Baoji
- Ningxia
  - Zhongshan Park, Yinchuan

== National Urban Wetland Parks of China ==
- Ratified by: Ministry of Housing and Urban-Rural Development
- Number of NUWPs (unit): 58 (as at January 11, 2017)
- Total Number of UWPs (unit): TBV
- Beijing
  - Cuihu National Urban Wetland Park, Haidian
- Hebei
  - Nanhu National Urban Wetland Park, Tangshan
  - Jumayuan National Urban Wetland Park, Laiyuan, Baoding
- Shanxi
  - Changzhi National Urban Wetland Park
  - Shengxihu National Urban Wetland Park, Xiaoyi
- Inner Mongolia
  - Ergun National Urban Wetland Park
- Liaoning
  - Lianhuahu National Urban Wetland Park, Tieling
- Jilin
  - Nanhu National Urban Wetland Park, Zhenlai
- Heilongjiang
  - Yuting National Urban Wetland Park, Nehe
  - Qunli National Urban Wetland Park, Harbin
  - Wudalianchi Huoshan National Urban Wetland Park
- Jiangsu
  - Changguangxi National Urban Wetland Park, Wuxi
  - Shanghu National Urban Wetland Park, Changshu
  - Shajiabang National Urban Wetland Park, Changshu
  - Lushuiwan National Urban Wetland Park, Nanjing
  - Kunshan Urban Ecopark
  - Guchenghu National Urban Wetland Park, Gaochun, Nanjing
  - Dayangwan National Urban Wetland Park, Yancheng
- Zhejiang
  - Jinghu National Urban Wetland Park, Shaoxing
  - Sanjiang National Urban Wetland Park, Linhai
  - Jianyanghu National Urban Wetland Park, Taizhou
  - Shijiuyang National Urban Wetland Park, Jiaxing
  - Wuxing Xishanyang National Urban Wetland Park, Huzhou
- Anhui
  - Nanhu National Urban Wetland Park, Huaibei
  - Shijianhu National Urban Wetland Park, Huainan
  - Xihu National Urban Wetland Park, Tongling
- Fujian
  - Xinglinwan National Urban Wetland Park, Xiamen
- Jiangxi
  - Kongmujiang National Urban Wetland Park, Xinyu
- Shandong
  - Sanggouwan National Urban Wetland Park, Rongcheng
  - Mingyuehu National Urban Wetland Park, Dongying
  - Daotunwa National Urban Wetland Park, Dongping
  - Binhe National Urban Wetland Park, Linyi
  - Xiaohai'erkou National Urban Wetland Park, Haiyang
  - Dawenhe National Urban Wetland Park, Anqiu
  - Tuhaihe National Urban Wetland Park, Zhanhua
  - Shuangyuehu National Urban Wetland Park, Linyi
  - Bailang Lüzhou National Urban Wetland Park, Weifang
  - Weishui Fengqing National Urban Wetland Park, Changyi
  - Binhe National Urban Wetland Park, Shouguang
- Henan
  - Tian'ehu National Urban Wetland Park, Sanmenxia
  - Baihe National Urban Wetland Park, Nanyang
  - Pingxihu National Urban Wetland Park, Pingdingshan
  - Bailuzhou National Urban Wetland Park, Pingdingshan
- Hubei
  - Jinyinhu National Urban Wetland Park, Wuhan
- Hunan
  - Xidongtinghu Qingshanhu National Urban Wetland Park, Changde
- Guangdong
  - Lutanghe National Urban Wetland Park, Zhanjiang
  - Dongguan National Urban Wetland Park
  - Dayawan Mangrove Forest National Urban Wetland Park, Huizhou
- Chongqing
  - Guanyintang National Urban Wetland Park, Bishan
- Sichuan
  - Langzhong Gucheng National Urban Wetland Park
  - Bailuwan National Urban Wetland Park, Chengdu
- Guizhou
  - Huaxi National Urban Wetland Park, Guiyang
  - Hongfenghu - Baihuahu National Urban Wetland Park, Guiyang
  - Huangguoshu National Urban Wetland park, Anshun
- Gansu
  - Chengbei National Urban Wetland Park, Zhangye
  - Heihe National Urban Wetland Park, Gaotai, Zhangye
- Ningxia
  - Baohu National Urban Wetland Park, Yinchuan
- Xinjiang Production and Construction Corps
  - Qinggedahu National Urban Wetland Park, Wujiaqu, XPCC Sixth Division

== National Wetland Parks of China ==
- Ratified by: State Forestry and Grassland Administration
- Number of NWPs (unit): 883 (as at July 23, 2026)
- Area of NWPs (10,000 ha): 36.0 (as of 2008)
- Total Number of WPs (unit): 1,666 (as of 2024)
- Area of WPs (10,000 ha): 414.55 (as of 2024)
- Beijing
  - Yeyahu National Wetland Park
  - Fangshan Changgou Quanshui National Wetland Park
- Tianjin
  - Wuqing Yongdinghe Gudao National Wetland Park
  - Baodi Chaobaihe National Wetland Park
  - Jixian Zhouhe National Wetland Park, Jizhou
  - Xiaying Huanxiuhu National Wetland Park
- Hebei
  - Bashang Shandianhe National Wetland Park
  - Beidaihe National Wetland Park
  - Fengning Hailiutu National Wetland Park
  - Shangyi Qagan Nur National Wetland Park
  - Kangbao Kamba Nur National Wetland Park
  - Yongnianwa National Wetland Park
  - ~~Chongli Qingshuiheyuan National Wetland Park~~ (qualification cancelled on December 22, 2017)
  - Mulan Weichang Xiaoluanhe National Wetland Park
  - Xianghe Chaobaihe Dayunhe National Wetland Park
  - Huailai Guanting Shuiku National Wetland Park
  - Zhangbei Huanggainao National Wetland Park
  - Shexian Qingzhanghe National Wetland Park
  - Chengde Shuangtashan Luanhe National Wetland Park
  - Neiqiu Queshanhu National Wetland Park
  - Fengfeng Fuyanghe National Wetland Park
  - Longhua Yixunhe National Wetland Park
  - Qinglonghu National Wetland Park
  - Renxian Daluze National Wetland Park
  - Lulong Yiqubaiku National Wetland Park
  - Luanping Chaohe National Wetland Park
  - Yuxian Huliuhe National Wetland Park
  - Zhuolu Sangganhe National Wetland Park
  - Yangyuan Sangganhe National Wetland Park
- Shanxi
  - Gucheng National Wetland Park
  - Changyuanhe National Wetland Park
  - Qianquanhu National Wetland Park
  - Shuanglonghu National Wetland Park
  - Wenyuhe National Wetland Park
  - Jiexiu Fenhe National Wetland Park
  - Shenxi National Wetland Park
  - Qinheyuan National Wetland Park
  - Zhangzi Jingweihu National Wetland Park
  - Jishan Fenhe National Wetland Park
  - Xiaoyi Xiaohe National Wetland Park
  - Jingle Fenhechuan National Wetland Park
  - Hongtong Fenhe National Wetland Park
  - Youyu Cangtouhe National Wetland Park
  - Datong Sangganhe National Wetland Park
  - Huairen Kouquanhe National Wetland Park
  - Zuoquan Qingzhanghe National Wetland Park
  - Zezhou Danhe National Wetland Park
  - Yushe Zhanghe National Wetland Park
  - Shanyin Sangganhe National Wetland Park
- Inner Mongolia
  - Bailang Tao'erhe National Wetland Park
  - Alxa Huanghe National Wetland Park
  - Baotou Huanghe National Wetland Park
  - Narin Hu National Wetland Park
  - Bameihu National Wetland Park
  - Ergun National Wetland Park
  - Mianduhe National Wetland Park
  - Suorqi National Wetland Park
  - Xilinhe National Wetland Park
  - Har'us Hai National Wetland Park
  - Xar Us National Wetland Park
  - Duolun Luanheyuan National Wetland Park
  - Wuhai Longyouwan National Wetland Park
  - Linhe Huanghe National Wetland Park
  - Ulan Hot Tao'erhe National Wetland Park
  - Shangduhe National Wetland Park, Zhenglan Banner
  - Bailang Olon Bugan National Wetland Park
  - Zalantun Xiushui National Wetland Park
  - Mohort National Wetland Park
  - Chen Barag Tohoi National Wetland Park
  - Bairin Yaluhe National Wetland Park
  - Manzhouli Erka National Wetland Park
  - Naiman Mengjiaduan National Wetland Park
  - Baotou Hondlon He National Wetland Park
  - Xinghe Qar Hu National Wetland Park
  - Dengkou Nailunhu National Wetland Park
  - Jining Bawanghe National Wetland Park
  - Ulan Nur National Wetland Park, Dalad Banner
  - Jalaid Chaor Tohin He National Wetland Park
  - Hulstai Nur National Wetland Park, Horqin Left Rear Banner
  - Olji Moron He National Wetland Park, Bairin Left Banner
  - Manzhouli Holgin Bulag National Wetland Park
  - Nanmu Yakehe National Wetland Park
  - Onor Changshouhu National Wetland Park
  - Hulun Buir Yinlinghe National Wetland Park
  - Honggolj Yiminhe National Wetland Park
  - Chaihe Gol National Wetland Park
  - Morin Dawa Bayan National Wetland Park
  - Junmahu National Wetland Park, Zhengxiangbai Banner
  - Xilin Gol Jinghu National Wetland Park
  - Hunhe National Wetland Park, Qingshuihe
  - Shangdu Qagan Nur National Wetland Park
- Liaoning
  - Tieling Lianhuahu National Wetland Park
  - Dahuofang National Wetland Park
  - Datanghe National Wetland Park
  - Huanlonghu National Wetland Park
  - Faku Huanzidong National Wetland Park
  - Liaozhong Puhe National Wetland Park
  - Fushun Shehe National Wetland Park
  - Shenbei Qixing National Wetland Park
  - Huludao Longxing National Wetland Park
  - Beizhen Xinlihu National Wetland Park
  - Fengcheng Caohe National Wetland Park
  - Lingyuan Qinglonghe National Wetland Park
  - Panshan Raoyangwan National Wetland Park
  - Changtu Liaohe National Wetland Park
  - Kangping Liaohe National Wetland Park
  - Yixian Dalinghe National Wetland Park
  - Panjin Liaohe National Wetland Park
  - Wensheng Taizihe National Wetland Park
- Jilin
  - Mopanhu National Wetland Park
  - Fuyu Dajinbei National Wetland Park
  - Da'an Nenjiangwan National Wetland Park
  - Dashitou Yaguanghu National Wetland Park
  - ~~Yushu Laoganjiang National Wetland Park~~ (qualification cancelled on August 16, 2016)
  - Niuxintaobao National Wetland Park
  - Zhenlai Huancheng National Wetland Park
  - Dongliao Ciluhu National Wetland Park
  - Changchun Beihu National Wetland Park
  - Changbai Nilihe National Wetland Park
  - Helong Quanshuihe National Wetland Park
  - Tonghua Laguhe National Wetland Park
  - Bajiazi Gudonghe National Wetland Park
  - Changbaishan Jianshuihe National Wetland Park
  - Ji'an Bawangchao National Wetland Park
  - Linjiang Wudaogou National Wetland Park
  - Liaoyuan Fengminghu National Wetland Park
  - Nong'an Taipingchi National Wetland Park
  - Changchun Xinlihu National Wetland Park
  - Baishan Zhubaohe National Wetland Park
  - Wangqing Gayahe National Wetland Park
  - Dunhua Qiuligou National Wetland Park
  - Siping Jiashutaihu National Wetland Park
  - Taonan Sihaihu National Wetland Park
- Heilongjiang
  - Taiyangdao National Wetland Park
  - Baiyupao National Wetland Park
  - Fujin National Wetland Park
  - Anbanghe National Wetland Park
  - Tatouhuhe National Wetland Park
  - Qiqihar Mingxingdao National Wetland Park
  - Taihu National Wetland Park
  - Zhaoyueshan National Wetland Park
  - Tongjiang Sanjiangkou National Wetland Park
  - Heixiazidao National Wetland Park
  - Bayan Jiangwan National Wetland Park
  - Dorbod Tianhu National Wetland Park
  - Mayanhe National Wetland Park
  - Zhaoyuan Lianhuahu National Wetland Park
  - Mulan Songhuajiang National Wetland Park
  - Baihuachuan National Wetland Park
  - Binxian Erlonghu National Wetland Park
  - Tonghe Erlongtan National Wetland Park
  - Yichun Maolanhekou National Wetland Park
  - Hegang Shilihe National Wetland Park
  - Hulin National Wetland Park
  - Tahe Guqigu National Wetland Park
  - Anda Gudahu National Wetland Park
  - Qitaihe Taoshanhu National Wetland Park
  - Harbin Songbei National Wetland Park
  - Qinggang Jinghe National Wetland Park
  - Raohe Wusulijiang National Wetland Park
  - Dongning Suifenhe National Wetland Park
  - Qiqihar Jiangxindao National Wetland Park
  - Hulanhekou National Wetland Park
  - Shangzhi Mayihe National Wetland Park
  - Fuyu Long'anqiao National Wetland Park
  - Suibin Yueyahu National Wetland Park
  - Bei'an Uyer He National Wetland Park (alt. Uyerin Gol)
  - Harbin Alejindao National Wetland Park
  - Mudanjiang Yanjiang National Wetland Park
  - Hailanghe National Wetland Park, Xi'an District
  - Fangzhenghu National Wetland Park
  - Harbin Ashihe National Wetland Park
  - Daqing heiyuhu National Wetland Park
  - Nianzishan Yaluhe National Wetland Park
  - Heihe Kunhe National Wetland Park
  - Lanxi Hulanhe National Wetland Park
  - Xiaomulinghe National Wetland Park, 858 Farm
  - Muling Leifenghe National Wetland Park
  - Aihui Larbinhe National Wetland Park
- Shanghai
  - Chongming Xisha National Wetland Park
  - Wusong Paotaiwan National Wetland Park
- Jiangsu
  - Jiangyan Qinhu National Wetland Park
  - Yangzhou Baoyinghu National Wetland Park
  - Suzhou Taihu Hubin National Wetland Park
  - Wuxi Changguangxi National Wetland Park
  - Shajiabang National Wetland Park
  - Nanjing Changjiang Xinjizhou National Wetland Park
  - Suzhou Taihu National Wetland Park
  - Wuxi Lianghong National Wetland Park
  - Yangzhou Fenghuangdao National Wetland Park
  - Taihu Sanshandao National Wetland Park
  - Wuxi Lihu National Wetland Park
  - Liyang Tianmuhu National Wetland Park
  - Jiulihu National Wetland Park
  - Huai'an Guhuaihe National Wetland Park
  - Jurong Chishanhu National Wetland Park
  - Kunshan Tianfu National Wetland Park
  - Wujiang Tongli National Wetland Park
  - Xuzhou Pan'anhu National Wetland Park
  - Fengxian Huanghegudao Dashahe National Wetland Park
  - Liyang Changdanghu National Wetland Park
  - Peixian Anguohu National Wetland Park
  - Jianhu Jiulongkou National Wetland Park
  - Huai'an Baimahu National Wetland Park
  - Donghai Xishuanghu National Wetland Park
  - Xinghua Lixiahe National Wetland Park
  - Jintan Changdanghu National Wetland Park
  - Yancheng Dazonghu National Wetland Park
  - Yangzhou Beihu National Wetland Park
- Zhejiang
  - Hangzhou Xixi National Wetland Park
  - ~~Lishui Jiulong National Wetland Park~~
  - ~~Deqing Xiazhuhu National Wetland Park~~
  - Wuxijiang National Wetland Park, Quzhou
  - Baitahu National Wetland Park, Zhuji
  - Xianshanhu National Wetland Park, Changxing
  - Hangzhouwan National Wetland Park
  - Xuanmenwan National Wetland Park, Yuhuan
  - ~~Tiantai Shifengxi National Wetland Park~~
  - Yunhe Terraced Field National Wetland Park
  - Puyangjiang National Wetland Park, Pujiang
  - Jianhu National Wetland Park, Shaoxing
  - Jiaxing Yunhewan National Wetland Park
- Anhui
  - Taipinghu National Wetland Park
  - Digou National Wetland Park
  - Sixian Shilonghu National Wetland Park
  - Sanchahe National Wetland Park
  - Huainan Jiaoganghu National Wetland Park
  - Taihe Shayinghe National Wetland Park
  - Taihu Huatinghu National Wetland Park
  - Yingzhou Xihu National Wetland Park
  - Qiupuheyuan National Wetland Park
  - Pingtianhu National Wetland Park
  - Pihe National Wetland Park
  - Daoyuan National Wetland Park
  - Anqing Caizihu National Wetland Park
  - Tongcheng Xizihu National Wetland Park
  - Jieshou Liangwan National Wetland Park
  - Funan Wangjiaba National Wetland Park
  - Lixin Xifeihe National Wetland Park
  - Feixi Sanhe National Wetland Park
  - Xiuning Hengjiang National Wetland Park
  - Luyang Dongpu National Wetland Park
  - Feidong Guanwan National Wetland Park
  - Chaohu Bandao National Wetland Park
  - Qianshan Qianshuihe National Wetland Park
  - Yingquan Quanshuiwan National Wetland Park
  - Huaibei Zhonghu National Wetland Park
  - Mengcheng Beifeihe National Wetland Park
  - Hefei Chaohu Hubin National Wetland Park
  - Huaining Guanyinhu National Wetland Park
  - Lai'an Chishanhu National Wetland Park
- Fujian
  - Minjiang Hekou National Wetland Park, Changle
  - ~~Ningde Donghu National Wetland Park~~ (qualification cancelled on August 16, 2016)
  - Longtou National Wetland Park, Yong'an
  - Tingjiang National Wetland Park, Changting
  - Nanyang National Wetland Park, Zhangping
  - Taoxi National Wetland Park, Yongchun
  - Zhongshanhe National Wetland Park, Wuping
  - Nianshan National Wetland Park, Zhenghe
  - Minjiangyuan National Wetland Park, Jianning
- Jiangxi
  - Kongmujiang National Wetland Park
  - Dongpoyanghu National Wetland Park
  - Dongjiangyuan National Wetland Park
  - Xiuhe National Wetland Park
  - Yaohu National Wetland Park
  - Nanfeng Nuohu National Wetland Park
  - Lushanxihai National Wetland Park
  - Xiuheyuan National Wetland Park
  - Lianjiang National Wetland Park
  - Ganxian Dahujiang National Wetland Park
  - Ganzhou Zhangjiang National Wetland Park
  - Wannian Zhuxi National Wetland Park
  - Shangyou Nanhu National Wetland Park
  - Huichang Xiangjiang National Wetland Park
  - Nancheng Hongmenhu National Wetland Park
  - Wuyuan Raoheyuan National Wetland Park
  - Jingdezhen Yutianhu National Wetland Park
  - Ningdu Meijiang National Wetland Park
  - Yingtan Xinjiang National Wetland Park
  - Suichuan Wudoujiang National Wetland Park
  - Sanqingshan Xinjiangyuan National Wetland Park
  - Luling Ganjiang National Wetland Park
  - Luxi Shankouyan National Wetland Park
  - Gao'an Jinjiang National Wetland Park
  - Xunwu Dongjiangyuan National Wetland Park
  - Shicheng Ganjiangyuan National Wetland Park
  - Zixi Jiulonghu National Wetland Park
  - Hengfeng Cen'ganghe National Wetland Park
  - Lianhua Lianjiang National Wetland Park
  - Chongyi Yangminghu National Wetland Park
  - Dayu Zhangshui National Wetland Park
  - Quannan Taojiang National Wetland Park
  - Wan'anhu National Wetland Park
  - Ruijin Mianjiang National Wetland Park
  - Jishui Jihu National Wetland Park
  - Xiajiang Yuxiahu National Wetland Park
  - Fuzhou Fengganghe National Wetland Park
  - Fuzhou Liaofang National Wetland Park
  - Guangchang Fuheyuan National Wetland Park
  - Nanfeng Tanhu National Wetland Park
- Shandong
  - Binhu National Wetland Park, Tengzhou
  - Tai'erzhuang Yunhe National Wetland Park
  - Matahu National Wetland Park
  - Jixi National Wetland Park
  - Huanghe Meiguihu National Wetland Park
  - Panlonghe National Wetland Park
  - Xiashanhu National Wetland Park
  - Yueliangwan National Wetland Park
  - Yongcuihu National Wetland Park, Anqiu
  - Shouguang Binhai National Wetland Park
  - Weishanhu National Wetland Park
  - Wuhe National Wetland Park
  - Shaohai National Wetland Park
  - Jiulongwan National Wetland Park
  - Baiyunhu National Wetland Park, Jinan
  - Huanghedao National Wetland Park
  - Dongming Huanghe National Wetland Park
  - ~~Weifang Bailanghe National Wetland Park~~
  - ~~Shuhe National Wetland Park~~
  - Junan Jilonghe National Wetland Park
  - ~~Dong'e Luoshenhu National Wetland Park~~
  - ~~Qufu Kongzihu National Wetland Park~~
  - ~~Wangwuhu National Wetland Park~~
  - ~~Laizhouwan Jincang National Wetland Park~~ (qualification cancelled on December 29, 2018)
  - Yunmenghu National Wetland Park
  - ~~Yinan Wenhe National Wetland Park~~
  - ~~Tanghe National Wetland Park~~
  - Yishuhe National Wetland Park
  - Yihe National Wetland Park (renamed, orig. Yishui NWP)
  - Pingyi Junhe National Wetland Park
  - Caoxian Huanghe Gudao National Wetland Park
  - Qingzhou Mihe National Wetland Park
  - Yuwang National Wetland Park, Weifang
  - ~~Changyi Binhai National Wetland Park~~
  - Madahu National Wetland Park, Boxing
  - Taiping National Wetland Park, Zoucheng
  - Futuanhekou National Wetland Park, Rizhao
  - ~~Muping Qinshuihekou National Wetland Park~~
  - ~~Qingdao Tangdaowan National Wetland Park~~
  - ~~Liangshanpo National Wetland Park~~
  - Zhucheng Weihe National Wetland Park
  - ~~Sishui Siheyuan National Wetland Park~~
  - Jinshuihu National Wetland Park, Jinxiang
  - Tai'an Wenhe National Wetland Park
  - Feicheng Kangwanghe National Wetland Park
  - Yucheng Tuhaihe National Wetland Park
  - Huanghe Shuixiang National Wetland Park, Qihe
  - Fulonghu National Wetland Park, Shanxian
  - Jinniuhu National Wetland Park, Chiping
  - Jiulongkou National Wetland Park, Xiajin
  - Wuleidaowan National Wetland Park, Weihai
  - Binzhou Qinhuanghe National Wetland Park
  - ~~Dongping Binhu National Wetland Park~~
  - ~~Rizhao Liangchenghekou National Wetland Park~~
  - ~~Laiwu Xueyehu National Wetland Park~~
  - Gangcheng Dawenhe National Wetland Park
  - ~~Liaocheng Dongchanghu National Wetland Park~~
  - Tianninghu National Wetland Park, Kenli
  - Dezhou Jianhe National Wetland Park
  - ~~Chengwu Dongyuhe National Wetland Park~~
  - Rizhao Xihu National Wetland Park
  - ~~Boshan Wuyanghu National Wetland Park~~
  - Gaomi Jiaohe National Wetland Park
  - Huibaohu National Wetland Park, Lanling
  - Yuemahe National Wetland Park, Leling
  - Juxian Shuhe National Wetland Park
  - Xiaokaihe National Wetland Park, Binzhou
  - Linqu Mihe National Wetland Park
  - Laiyang Wulonghe National Wetland Park (redesignated, orig. Laiyang Wulonghe Wetland PNR & Laiyang Wulonghekou Littoral Wetland NSMPA)
- Henan
  - Zhengzhou Huanghe National Wetland Park
  - Huaiyang Longhu National Wetland Park
  - ~~Yanshi Yiluohe National Wetland Park~~ (qualification cancelled on August 16, 2016)
  - Pingdingshan Baiguihu National Wetland Park
  - Hebi Qihe National Wetland Park
  - Shahe National Wetland Park, Luohe
  - Tangyin Tanghe National Wetland Park
  - Puyang Jindihe National Wetland Park
  - Pingqiao Lianghekou National Wetland Park
  - Nanyang Baihe National Wetland Park
  - Tanghe National Wetland Park
  - Luhunhu National Wetland Park
  - Xiangcheng Fenquanhe National Wetland Park
  - Taiqian Jinshui National Wetland Park
  - Xixian Huaihe National Wetland Park
  - Minquan Huanghe Gudao National Wetland Park
  - Anyang Zhanghe Xiagu National Wetland Park
  - Linzhou Qihe Xihe National Wetland Park
  - Changge Shuangjihe National Wetland Park
  - Xichuan Danyanghu National Wetland Park
  - Dengzhou Tuanhe National Wetland Park
  - Biyang Tongshanhu National Wetland Park
  - Zhecheng Ronghu National Wetland Park
  - Suixian Zhongyuan Shuicheng National Wetland Park
  - Yucheng Zhoushangyong Yunhe National Wetland Park (alt. Zhoukou-Shangqiu-Yongcheng Canal)
  - Xiangcheng Beiruhe National Wetland Park
  - Guangshan Longshanhu National Wetland Park
  - Xinxian Xiangshanhu National Wetland Park
  - Yichuan Yihe National Wetland Park
  - Luyi Huijihe National Wetland Park
  - Nanle Majiahe National Wetland Park
  - Ruzhou Ruhe National Wetland Park
  - Wugang Shimantan National Wetland Park
  - Yanling Heminghu National Wetland Park
  - Yuzhou Yinghe National Wetland Park
  - Liangyuan Huanghe Gudao National Wetland Park
- Hubei
  - Shennongjia Dajiuhu National Wetland Park
  - Wuhan Donghu National Wetland Park
  - Gucheng Hanjiang National Wetland Park
  - Qichun Chilonghu National Wetland Park
  - Chibi Lushuihu National Wetland Park
  - Jingmen Zhanghe National Wetland Park
  - Macheng Fuqiaohe National Wetland Park
  - Huitinghu National Wetland Park
  - Mochouhu National Wetland Park
  - Daye Bao'anhu National Wetland Park
  - Yidu Tianlongwan National Wetland Park
  - Huanggang Yi'aihu National Wetland Park
  - Jinshahu National Wetland Park
  - Tiantanghu National Wetland Park
  - Wushanhu National Wetland Park
  - Fanwanhu National Wetland Park
  - Changshoudao National Wetland Park
  - Tongcheng Daxi National Wetland Park
  - Chongyang Qingshan National Wetland Park
  - Shayang Panjihu National Wetland Park
  - Jiangxia Canglongdao National Wetland Park
  - Zhushan Shengshuihu National Wetland Park
  - Dangyang Qinglonghu National Wetland Park
  - Zhuxi Longhu National Wetland Park
  - Xishui Cehu National Wetland Park
  - Xiantao Shahu National Wetland Park
  - Wuhan Anshan National Wetland Park
  - Xiangyang Hanjiang National Wetland Park
  - Tongshan Fushuihu National Wetland Park
  - Fangxian Gu'nanhe National Wetland Park
  - Caidian Houguanhu National Wetland Park
  - Xiaogan Zhuhu National Wetland Park
  - Yuan'an Juhe National Wetland Park
  - Songzi Weishui National Wetland Park
  - Shiyan Huanglongtan National Wetland Park
  - Xuan'en Gongshuihe National Wetland Park
  - Jingmen Xianjuhe National Wetland Park
  - Suixian Fengjiangkou National Wetland Park
  - Yicheng Wanyangzhou National Wetland Park
  - Xianning Xiangyanghu National Wetland Park
  - Changyang Qingjiang National Wetland Park
  - Huanggang Bailianhe National Wetland Park
  - Wuhan Dugonghu National Wetland Park
  - Nanzhang Qinglianghe National Wetland Park
  - Zhijiang Jinhu National Wetland Park
  - Hanchuan Diaochahu National Wetland Park
  - Jingzhou Ancient City Ring National Wetland Park
  - Gong'an Chonghu National Wetland Park
  - Anlu Fuhe National Wetland Park
  - Wufeng Baixihe National Wetland Park
  - Xiaogan Laoguanhu National Wetland Park
  - Yingshan Zhangjiazui National Wetland Park
  - Yunmeng Yunshui National Wetland Park
  - Yiling Quanyitang National Wetland Park
  - Tianmen Zhangjiahu National Wetland Park
  - Jingzhou Lingjiaohu National Wetland Park
  - Shishou Sanlinghu National Wetland Park
  - Guangshui Xujiahe National Wetland Park
  - Shiyan Yunyanghu National Wetland Park
  - Yangxin Lianhuahu National Wetland Park
  - Jianli Laojianghe Gudao National Wetland Park
  - Jiayu Zhenhu National Wetland Park
  - Shiyan Sihe National Wetland Park
  - Laohekou Xipaizihu National Wetland Park
  - Suizhou Huaihe National Wetland Park
  - Zigui Jiuwanxi National Wetland Park
- Hunan
  - Shuifumiao National Wetland Park
  - Dongjianghu National Wetland Park
  - Qianlonghu National Wetland Park
  - Jiubujiang National Wetland Park
  - Xuefenghu National Wetland Park
  - Xiangyin Yangshahu - Donghu National Wetland Park
  - Ningxiang Jinzhouhu National Wetland Park
  - Jishou Donghe National Wetland Park
  - Miluojiang National Wetland Park
  - Maolihu National Wetland Park
  - Wuqiangxi National Wetland Park
  - Songyahu National Wetland Park
  - Leishui National Wetland Park
  - Shuyuanzhou National Wetland Park
  - Xinqianghe National Wetland Park
  - Nanzhou National Wetland Park
  - Qionghu National Wetland Park
  - Huangjiahu National Wetland Park
  - Taoyuan Yuanshui National Wetland Park
  - Hengdong Mishui National Wetland Park
  - Chengbu Baiyunhu National Wetland Park
  - Jianghua Centianhe National Wetland Park
  - Huitong Qushui National Wetland Park
  - Longhui Weiyuanhu National Wetland Park
  - Shaoyang Tianzihu National Wetland Park
  - Lizhou Cenhuai National Wetland Park
  - Guiyang Chongling National Wetland Park
  - Xupu Simeng National Wetland Park
  - Huarong Donghu National Wetland Park
  - Shuangpai Riyuehu National Wetland Park
  - Changning Tianhu National Wetland Park
  - Suining Huayuange National Wetland Park
  - Dong'an Zishui National Wetland Park
  - Liling Guanzhuanghu National Wetland Park
  - Taojiang Xiunühu National Wetland Park
  - Pingjiang Huangjinhe National Wetland Park
  - Chaling Dongyanghu National Wetland Park
  - Hongjiang Qingjianghu National Wetland Park
  - Jingzhou Wulongtan National Wetland Park
  - Dingcheng Niao'erzhou National Wetland Park
  - Luxi Wushui National Wetland Park
  - Huayuan Gumiaohe National Wetland Park
  - Hengshan Xuanzhou National Wetland Park
  - Xinshao Xiaoxi National Wetland Park
  - Xinhua Longwan National Wetland Park
  - Dongkou Pingxijiang National Wetland Park
  - Hengnan Lianhuwan National Wetland Park
  - Shimen Xianyanghu National Wetland Park
  - Datonghu National Wetland Park
  - Anren Yonglejiang National Wetland Park
  - Heshan Laiyihu National Wetland Park
  - Chenzhou Xihe National Wetland Park
  - Xinning Fuyijiang National Wetland Park
  - Jindong Mengjianghe National Wetland Park
  - Ningyuan Jiuyihe National Wetland Park
  - Tongdao Yudaihe National Wetland Park
  - Liuyanghe National Wetland Park
  - Lianyuan Meifenghu National Wetland Park
  - Yunxi Bainihu National Wetland Park
  - Baojing Youshui National Wetland Park
  - Mayang Jinjiang National Wetland Park
  - Yongshun Mengdonghe National Wetland Park
  - Lingling Xiaoshui National Wetland Park
  - Hanshou Xifenghu National Wetland Park
  - Changsha Yanghu National Wetland Park
  - Zhongfang Wushui National Wetland Park
  - Jiahe Zhongshuihe National Wetland Park
  - Qiyang Wuxi National Wetland Park
  - Linli Daoshuihe National Wetland Park
  - Jiangyong Yongminghe National Wetland Park
- Guangdong
  - Xinghu National Wetland Park
  - Leizhou Jiulongshan Mangrove Forest National Wetland Park
  - Ruyuan Nanshuihu National Wetland Park
  - Wanlühu National Wetland Park
  - Kongjiang National Wetland Park
  - Dongjiang National Wetland Park
  - Guangzhou Haizhu National Wetland Park
  - Huaiji Yandu National Wetland Park
  - Xinfeng Luguhe National Wetland Park
  - Yunan Dahe National Wetland Park
  - Hailingdao Mangrove Forest National Wetland Park
  - Machong Huayanghu National Wetland Park
  - Zhongshan Cuiheng National Wetland Park
  - Luoding Jinyinhu National Wetland Park
  - Wengyuan Wengjiangyuan National Wetland Park
  - Huaduhu National Wetland Park
  - Kaiping Kongquehu National Wetland Park
  - Yangdong Shouchanghe National Wetland Park
  - Xinhui Xiaoniaotiantang National Wetland Park (alt. Bird's Paradise)
  - Sihui Suijiang National Wetland Park
  - Liannan Yaopai Terraced Field National Wetland Park
  - Shenzhen Huaqiaocheng National Wetland Park (Huaqiaocheng: a cultural theme park officially known as Overseas Chinese Town [OCT] in English)
  - Huizhou Tonghu National Wetland Park
  - Nanhai Jinshadao National Wetland Park
  - Sanshui Yundonghai National Wetland Park
  - Zhuhai Hengqin National Wetland Park
  - Taishan Zhenhaiwan Mangrove Forest National Wetland Park
- Guangxi
  - Beihai Binhai National Wetland Park
  - Guilin Huixian Karst National Wetland Park
  - Hengxian Xijin National Wetland Park
  - Fuchuan Guishi National Wetland Park
  - Du'an Chengjiang National Wetland Park
  - Jingxi Longtan National Wetland Park
  - Bose Fuluhe National Wetland Park
  - Lingyun Haokunhu National Wetland Park
  - Pingguo Luxianhu National Wetland Park
  - Daxin Heishuihe National Wetland Park
  - Longzhou Zuojiang National Wetland Park
  - Donglan Pohaohu National Wetland Park
  - Lipu Lijiang National Wetland Park
  - Longsheng Longji Terraced Field National Wetland Park
  - Nandan Laxi National Wetland Park
  - Wuzhou Canghai National Wetland Park
  - Nanning Dawangtan National Wetland Park
  - Quanzhou Tianhu National Wetland Park
  - Guanyang Guanjiang National Wetland Park
  - Hezhou Hemianshihu National Wetland Park
  - Zhaoping Guijiang National Wetland Park
  - Xincheng Letan National Wetland Park
  - Heshan Luolinghu National Wetland Park
  - Xingbin Sanlihu National Wetland Park
- Hainan
  - Xinying National Wetland Park
  - Nanlihu National Wetland Park
  - Sanya Donghe National Wetland Park
  - Changjiang Haiwei National Wetland Park
  - Haikou Wuyuanhe National Wetland Park
  - Haikou Meishehe National Wetland Park
  - Lingshui Mangrove Forest National Wetland Park
- Chongqing
  - Yunwushan National Wetland Park
  - Youshuihe National Wetland Park
  - Huanghuadao National Wetland Park
  - Apengjiang National Wetland Park
  - Yingfenghu National Wetland Park
  - Laixihe National Wetland Park
  - Caiyunhu National Wetland Park
  - Fujiang National Wetland Park
  - Kaixian Hanfenghu National Wetland Park
  - Longhe National Wetland Park
  - Dachanghu National Wetland Park
  - Qingshanhu National Wetland Park
  - Yinglonghu National Wetland Park
  - Bashanhu National Wetland Park
  - Nanchuan Lixianghu National Wetland Park
  - Xiushan Daxi National Wetland Park
  - Shizhu Tengzigou National Wetland Park
  - Tongliang Anju National Wetland Park
  - Liangping Shuangguihu National Wetland Park
  - Wulong Furonghu National Wetland Park
  - Hechuan Sanjiang National Wetland Park
  - Qijiang Tonghuihe National Wetland Park
- Sichuan
  - ~~Pengzhou Jianjiang National Wetland Park~~ (qualification cancelled on December 31, 2015)
  - Nanhe National Wetland Park
  - Dawashan National Wetland Park
  - Gouxihe National Wetland Park
  - Suoluohu National Wetland Park
  - Bailinhu National Wetland Park
  - Zoigê National Wetland Park
  - Suining Guanyinhu National Wetland Park
  - Xichong Qinglonghu National Wetland Park
  - Nanchong Shengzhonghu National Wetland Park
  - Qionghai National Wetland Park
  - Yingshan Qingshuihu National Wetland Park
  - Renshou Heilongtan National Wetland Park
  - Xinjin Baihetan National Wetland Park
  - Peng'an Xiangruhu National Wetland Park
  - Longchang Guyuhu National Wetland Park
  - Aba Domai Lingga National Wetland Park
  - Hongyuan Garqu National Wetland Park
  - Songpan Minjiangyuan National Wetland Park
  - Pingchang Simahe National Wetland Park
  - Guang'an Baiyunhu National Wetland Park
  - Naxi Fenghuanghu National Wetland Park
  - Leibo Mahu National Wetland Park
  - Baiyu Lalungco National Wetland Park
  - Mianyang Sanjianghu National Wetland Park
  - Shawan Daduhe National Wetland Park
  - Luhuo Xianshuihe National Wetland Park
  - Batang Zimeihu National Wetland Park
  - Jiangyou Rangshuihe National Wetland Park
  - Quxian Baishuihu National Wetland Park
- Guizhou
  - Shiqian Yuanyanghu National Wetland Park
  - Weining Suohuangcang National Wetland Park
  - Liupanshui Minghu National Wetland Park
  - Yuqing Feilonghu National Wetland Park
  - Sinan Bailuhu National Wetland Park
  - Nayong Dapingqing National Wetland Park
  - Yanhe Wujiang National Wetland Park
  - Liupanshui Niangniangshan National Wetland Park
  - Dejiang Baiguotuo National Wetland Park
  - Xingyi Wanfeng National Wetland Park
  - Jiangkou National Wetland Park
  - Anlong Zhaodi National Wetland Park
  - Wanshan Changshouhu National Wetland Park
  - Beipanjiang Daxiagu National Wetland Park
  - Bijiang National Wetland Park
  - Qinglong Guangzhaohu National Wetland Park
  - Anshun Xingjianghe National Wetland Park
  - Guiyang Ahahu National Wetland Park
  - Luodian Mengjiang National Wetland Park
  - Duyun Qingshuijiang National Wetland Park
  - Libo Huangjianghe National Wetland Park
  - Guiding Bailonghe National Wetland Park
  - Zunyi Leminhe National Wetland Park
  - Fenggang Longtanhe National Wetland Park
  - Huichuan Labahe National Wetland Park
  - Meitan Meijianghu National Wetland Park
  - Xishui Dongfenghu National Wetland Park
  - Liping Bazhouhe National Wetland Park
  - Liupanshui Zangkejiang National Wetland Park
  - Qianxi Shuixi Kehai National Wetland Park
  - Congjiang Jiabang Terraced Field National Wetland Park
  - Huishui Yulianghe National Wetland Park
  - Pingtang National Wetland Park
  - Fuquan Chahe National Wetland Park
  - Wuchuan Hongduhe National Wetland Park
  - Qingzhen Hongfenghu National Wetland Park
  - Wangmo Beipanjiang National Wetland Park
  - Ceheng Beipanjiang National Wetland Park
  - Guiyang Baihuahu National Wetland Park
  - Dushan Jiushijiutan National Wetland Park
  - Taijiang Wengnihe National Wetland Park
  - Xiuwen Yanyinghu National Wetland Park
  - Yuping Wuyanghe National Wetland Park
  - Huangguoshu National Wetland Park
  - Yinjiang Chejiahe National Wetland Park
- Yunnan
  - Honghe Hani Terraced Field National Wetland Park
  - Eryuan Xihu National Wetland Park
  - Puzhehei Karst National Wetland Park
  - Pu'er Wuhu National Wetland Park
  - Yingjiang National Wetland Park
  - Heqing Dongcaohai National Wetland Park
  - Mengzi Changqiaohai National Wetland Park
  - Shiping Yilonghu National Wetland Park
  - Tonghai Qiluhu National Wetland Park
  - Jinning Nandianchi National Wetland Park
  - Zhanyi Xihe National Wetland Park
  - Yuxi Fuxianhu National Wetland Park
  - Baoshan Qinghuahai National Wetland Park
  - Luxi Huangcaozhou National Wetland Park
  - Lanping Qinghuadian National Wetland Park
  - Jiangchuan Xingyunhu National Wetland Park
  - Kunming Laoyuhe National Wetland Park
  - Lianghe Nandihe National Wetland Park
- Tibet
  - Doqênco National Wetland Park
  - Ya'nyi National Wetland Park
  - Kanam National Wetland Park
  - Tangra Yumco National Wetland Park
  - Gyanai Yuco National Wetland Park
  - Bainang Nyangqu He National Wetland Park
  - Lhamoi Laco National Wetland Park
  - Zhugla He National Wetland Park
  - Ngari Shiquanhe National Wetland Park
  - Riwoq Ziqu He National Wetland Park
  - Qonggyai Qunggo He National Wetland Park
  - Biru Naro National Wetland Park
  - Qusum Xaglho National Wetland Park
  - Zhoimalangco National Wetland Park
  - Konjo Lhato National Wetland Park
  - Nagqu Hangco National Wetland Park
  - Xigazê Gyangsa National Wetland Park
  - Banbar Jungraco National Wetland Park
  - Cona Nara Yumco National Wetland Park
  - Bangoin Qinglung Maqu National Wetland Park
  - Baqên Yuxongco Alpine Periglacial National Wetland Park
  - Dêngqên Putog Hu National Wetland Park
- Shaanxi
  - Xi'an Chanba National Wetland Park (note: rivers of Chanhe and Bahe)
  - Pucheng Luyanghu National Wetland Park
  - Qianhu National Wetland Park
  - Sanyuan Qingyuhe National Wetland Park
  - Chunhua Yeyuhe National Wetland Park
  - Tongchuan Zhaoshihe National Wetland Park
  - Danfeng Danjiang National Wetland Park
  - Ningqiang Hanshuiyuan National Wetland Park
  - Xunheyuan National Wetland Park
  - Fengxian Jialingjiang National Wetland Park
  - Taibai Shitouhe National Wetland Park
  - Xunyi Malanhe National Wetland Park
  - Qianweizhihui National Wetland Park
  - Jushui National Wetland Park
  - Shangzhou Danjiangyuan National Wetland Park
  - Xixiang Mumahe National Wetland Park
  - Dali Chaoyi National Wetland Park
  - Qiancenghe National Wetland Park
  - Fufeng Qixinghe National Wetland Park
  - Heyang Xushuihe National Wetland Park
  - Qishan Luoxingwan National Wetland Park
  - Meixian Longyuan National Wetland Park
  - Fuping Shichuanhe National Wetland Park
  - Yan'an Nanniwan National Wetland Park
  - Baishui Lingaohu National Wetland Park
  - Luonan Luoheyuan National Wetland Park
  - Tongguan Huanghe National Wetland Park
  - Yijun Fudihu National Wetland Park
  - Linwei Youhe National Wetland Park
  - Hanzhong Congtan National Wetland Park
  - Pingli Guxianhu National Wetland Park
  - Hanyin Guanyinhe National Wetland Park
  - Xi'an Tianyuhe National Wetland Park
  - Fengxiang Yongchenghu National Wetland Park
  - Yaozhou Juhe National Wetland Park
  - Zhenping Shuheyuan National Wetland Park
  - Liquan Ganhe National Wetland Park
  - Shiquan Hanjiang Lianhua Gudu National Wetland Park
  - Yongshou Qishuihe National Wetland Park
  - Huazhou Shaohuahu National Wetland Park
  - Huayin Taihuahu National Wetland Park
  - Jingyang Jinghe National Wetland Park
  - Pucheng Luohe National Wetland Park
- Gansu
  - Zhangye National Wetland Park
  - Lanzhou Qinwangchuan National Wetland Park
  - Minqin Shiyanghe National Wetland Park
  - Wenxian Huanglingou National Wetland Park
  - Jiayuguan Caohu National Wetland Park
  - Jiuquan Huachenghu National Wetland Park
  - Kangxian Meiyuanhe National Wetland Park
  - Jinta Beihaizi National Wetland Park
  - Jinchuan Jinshuihu National Wetland Park
  - Yongchang Beihaizi National Wetland Park
  - Yongtai Baidunzi Salt Marsh National Wetland Park
  - Lintao Taohe National Wetland Park
- Qinghai
  - Guide Huangheqing National Wetland Park
  - Xining Huangshui National Wetland Park
  - Taoheyuan National Wetland Park
  - Dulan Alag Hu National Wetland Park
  - Delhi Gahai National Wetland Park
  - Madoi Donggi Conag Hu National Wetland Park
  - Qilian Heiheyuan National Wetland Park
  - Ulan Dulanhu National Wetland Park
  - Yushu Baitang He National Wetland Park
  - Tianjun Buh He National Wetland Park
  - Huzhu Nanmenxia National Wetland Park
  - Zêkog Zêqu National Wetland Park
  - Baima Markog He National Wetland Park
  - Qumarlêb Dêrqu Yuan National Wetland Park
  - Ledu Dadiwan National Wetland Park
  - Gangca Shaliuhe National Wetland Park
  - Guinan Mangqu National Wetland Park
  - Gadê Baima Rintog National Wetland Park
  - Tarlag Huanghe National Wetland Park
- Ningxia
  - Yinchuan National Wetland Park
  - Shizuishan Xinghaihu National Wetland Park
  - Wuzhong Huanghe National Wetland Park
  - Huangsha Gudu National Wetland Park
  - Qingtongxia Niaodao National Wetland Park
  - Tianhu National Wetland Park
  - Guyuan Qingshuihe National Wetland Park
  - Hechuanhu National Wetland Park
  - Taiyangshan National Wetland Park
  - Jianquanhu National Wetland Park
  - Zhenshuohu National Wetland Park
  - Pingluo Tianhewan National Wetland Park
  - Zhongwei Xiangshanhu National Wetland Park
  - Yinchuan Huanghe Waitan National Wetland Park
- Xinjiang
  - Sairam Hu National Wetland Park
  - Ürümqi Chaiwopuhu National Wetland Park
  - Manas National Wetland Park
  - Uqilik National Wetland Park
  - ~~Altay Kran He National Wetland Park~~ (qualification cancelled on December 22, 2017)
  - Aksu Dolan He National Wetland Park
  - Hoboksar National Wetland Park
  - Niya National Wetland Park
  - Ulungur Hu National Wetland Park
  - Larkol National Wetland Park
  - Bosten Hu National Wetland Park
  - Tacheng Wuxianhe National Wetland Park
  - Shawan Qianquanhu National Wetland Park
  - Ili Narat National Wetland Park
  - Zepu Yarkant He National Wetland Park
  - Eminhe National Wetland Park
  - Yengisar National Wetland Park
  - Yutian Keriya He National Wetland Park
  - Wushi Toxkan He National Wetland Park
  - Hamihe National Wetland Park
  - Huocheng Ili Hegu National Wetland Park
  - Yining Ili He National Wetland Park
  - Ulungur He National Wetland Park, Qinghe
  - Jeminay Alpine Periglacial Zone National Wetland Park
  - Nilka Kax He National Wetland Park
  - Burqin Tokkumut National Wetland Park
  - Makit Tangwanghu National Wetland Park
  - Zhaosu Tekes He National Wetland Park
  - Jimsar Beiting National Wetland Park
  - Shule Xiangfeihu National Wetland Park
  - Shache Yarkant National Wetland Park
  - Pamir Gaoyuan Aral National Wetland Park
  - Fuyun Koktokay National Wetland Park
  - Bachu Baykol National Wetland Park
  - Yuli Lopnur National Wetland Park
  - Hoxud Taxhan National Wetland Park
  - Hutubi Dahaizi National Wetland Park
  - Tianshan Akyaz National Wetland Park
  - Wenquan Bortala He National Wetland Park
  - Tianshan Beipo Toutunhe National Wetland Park
  - Habahe Akqi National Wetland Park
  - Akqi Toxkan He National Wetland Park
  - Fukang Tenager National Wetland Park
  - Ili Yamat National Wetland Park
  - Tekes National Wetland Park
  - Yecheng Zonglang National Wetland Park
  - Zhaobishan National Wetland Park
  - Qapqal Ili He National Wetland Park
  - Ayding Hu National Wetland Park
  - Qira Damagou National Wetland Park
  - Yanqi Xiangsihu National Wetland Park
  - Bole Bortala He National Wetland Park
- China Inner Mongolia Forest Industry Group Co., Ltd.
  - Genheyuan National Wetland Park
  - Tol He National Wetland Park
  - Niu'erhe National Wetland Park
  - Chaoyuan National Wetland Park
  - Ih Tol He National Wetland Park
  - Dayangshu Kuilehe National Wetland Park
  - Ganhe National Wetland Park
  - Arxan Halh He National Wetland Park (alt. Halhiyn Gol)
  - Kaluben National Wetland Park
  - Huder He National Wetland Park
  - Chaor Yaduoluo National Wetland Park
  - Mangui Bei'ercihe National Wetland Park
  - Alongshan Aoluguya National Wetland Park
- Forest Industry Bureau of Heilongjiang Province
  - Xinqing National Wetland Park
  - Dongfanghong Nanchahu National Wetland Park
  - Hongxing Huojihe National Wetland Park
  - Xinglong Baiyangmuhe National Wetland Park
  - Yabuli Hongxinghe National Forest Park
  - Suiyang National Wetland Park
  - Dongjingcheng Jingpohuyuan National Wetland Park
  - Dahailin Erlanghe National Wetland Park
- Daxing'anling Forestry Group Corporation
  - Emur National Wetland Park
  - Shuangheyuan National Wetland Park
  - Mohe Jiuqushibawan National Wetland Park
  - Gulihe National Wetland Park
  - Kanduhe National Wetland Park
  - Huzhong Humaheyuan National Wetland Park
  - Mohe Dalinhe National Wetland Park
  - Shibazhan Humahe National Wetland Park
  - Jagdaqi Ganhe National Wetland Park
- Xinjiang Production and Construction Corps
  - Huyanghe National Wetland Park, XPCC Seventh Division
  - Qara Hu National Wetland Park, XPCC Second Division
  - Fengqinghu National Wetland Park, XPCC Tenth Division
  - Muzart National Wetland Park, XPCC Fourth Division
  - Humdan National Wetland Park, XPCC Fourteenth Division
  - Yukunlunhu National Wetland Park, XPCC Second Division

== National Water Parks of China ==
- Ratified by: Ministry of Water Resources
- Number of NWPs (unit): 934 (excl. 4 delisted sites, as at December 8, 2023)
- Total Number of Provincial WPs (unit): 1,000++ (as of 2012)
- Ministry of Water Resources
  - Huanghe Xiaolangdi Hydro Junction
  - Huanghe Wanjiazhai Hydro Junction
  - Jinan Baili Huanghe Park
- Changjiang Water Resources Commission
  - Danjiangkou Songtao Water Park
  - Danjiangkou Daba Water Park
  - Lushui Shuiku Water Park
- Yellow River Conservancy Commission
  - Huanghe Sanmenxia Daba Park
  - Henan Huanghe Huayuankou Park
  - Shanxi Yongji Huanghe Pujindu Water Park
  - Kaifeng Huanghe Liuyuankou Water Park
  - Puyang Huanghe Water Park
  - Fanxian Huanghe Water Park
  - Jinsanjiao Huanghe Water Park, Tongguan
  - Zibo Huanghe Water Park, Shandong
  - Jiangjundu Huanghe Water Park, Taiqian, Henan
  - Mengzhou Huanghe Water Park, Henan
  - Binzhou Huanghe Water Park, Shandong
  - Dong'e Huanghe Water Park
  - Dezhou Huanghe Water Park
  - Huanghekou Water Park, Kenli
  - Shandong Zouping Huanghe Water Park
  - Shandong Heze Huanghe Water Park
  - Gansu Qingyang Nanxiaohegou Water Park
  - Henan Luoning Xizihu Water Park
  - Shandong Lijin Huanghe Water Park
  - Luoyang Mengjin Huanghe Water Park
  - Changyuan Huanghe Water Park
  - Lankao Huanghe Water Park
- Huaihe River Commission
  - Shimantan Shuiku Park
  - Yihe Liujiadaokou Shuniu Water Park
  - Luomahu Zhangshan Water Park
  - Zhongyunhe Suqian Junction Water Park
- Haihe River Water Resources Commission
  - Zhangweinan Yunhe Water Park
  - Panjiakou Water Park
- Songliao River Water Resources Commission
  - Qarsan Shuiku Park
  - Nirji Water Park
- Taihu Basin Authority
  - Taihu Pujiangyuan Water Park
- Beijing
  - Shisanling Shuiku Resort
  - Qinglongxia Resort Village
  - Miaofengshan Water Park, Mentougou
- Tianjin
  - Beiyunhe Water Park
  - Donglihu Park
- Hebei
  - Qinhuangdao Taolinkou Park
  - Zhongshanhu Park
  - Yansaihu Park
  - Hengshuihu Park
  - Wuwushui Water Park, Pingshan (locally pronounced Huhushui)
  - Jingnianghu Park, Wu'an
  - Qiannanyu Eco-Water Park, Xingtai
  - Fenghuanghu Water Park, Xingtai
  - Miaogong Shuiku Water Park, Chengde
  - Dongwushi Shuiku Water Park, Handan
  - Luanhe Ecological Flood Control Water Park, Qian'an
  - Shandianhe Shuiku Water Park, Guyuan
  - Huangtuliang Shuiku Water Park, Fengning
  - Weixian Lixiang Shuicheng Water Park
  - Linzhang Yecheng Gongyuan Water Park
  - Hengshui Fuyanghe Water Park
  - Xingtai Qilihe Water Park
  - Luanxian Luanhe Water Park
  - Xingtai Zijinshan Water Park
  - Baoding Yishuihu Water Park
  - Handan Guangfu Gucheng Water Park
  - Zhangjiakou Qingshuihe Water Park
  - Zhangjiakou Sangganhe Water Park
  - Qianxi Luanshuiwan Water Park
  - Cangzhou Jiedi Yubeiyuan Water Park
- Shanxi
  - Fenhe Reservoir No.2 Park
  - Fenyuan Water Park
  - Taiyuan Fenhe Park
  - Zangshan Water Park, Yuxian
  - Shanliquan Water Park, Jincheng
  - Taihang Shuixiang Water Park, Pingshun
  - Sangganhe Wetland Water Park, Shuozhou
  - Cuifengshan Water Park, Yangquan
  - Changsheng Water Park, Liulin
  - Nuanquangou Water Park, Ningwu
  - Fenhe Shuiku Water Park
  - Beifang Shuicheng Water Park, Qinxian
  - Jingweihu Water Park, Zhangzi
  - Huyuan Water Park, Fanshi
  - Yuanping Hutuohe Water Park
  - Changzhi Zhangzehu Water Park
  - Huairen Emaohe Water Park
  - Yuncheng Boqinghe Water Park
  - Changzhi Houwan Shuiku Water Park
- Inner Mongolia
  - Hongshanhu Water Park
  - Dahushi Water Park, Ningcheng
  - Shimen Water Park, Baotou
  - Batuwan Water Park
  - Huanghe Sanshenggong Water Park
  - Nanshan Soil and Water Conservation Eco-Demonstration Park, Chifeng
  - Dal Nur Water Park, Chifeng
  - Qixinghu Desert Water Park, Hanggin
  - Jinshan Water Park, Harqin
  - Qianyaozi Shuiku Water Park, Horinger
  - Hangali Shuiku Water Park, Horqin Right Middle Banner
  - Ordos Desert Grand Canyon Water Park
  - Xishanwan Water Park, Duolun
  - ~~Chilechuan Har'us Hai Water Park, Hohhot~~ (revoked on December 8, 2023)
  - Shana Shuiku Water Park, Bairin Left Banner
  - Dalaha Hu Water Park, Ar Horqin
  - Erhuanghe Water Park, Bayannur
  - Fenghuanghu Water Park, Yakeshi
  - Baishi Water Park, Hohhot
  - Pishayan Water Park, Ordos
  - Dongjuyanhai Water Park, Ejin
  - Bayannur Delingshan Shuiku Water Park
  - Chifeng Ders Borin Shuiku Water Park
  - Bayannur Langshan Shuiku Water Park
  - Wuhaihu Water Park, Wuhai
  - Baotou Nanhai Shidi Water Park
  - Ordos Machangou Shenlongsi Water Park
  - Ulanhot Tao'erhe Water Park
  - Bayannur Ujur He Water Park
- Liaoning
  - Dahuofang Shuiku Park
  - Benxi Guanmenshan Park
  - Biliuhe Water Park, Dalian
  - Dalinghe Park, Chaoyang
  - Tanghe Shuiku Park
  - Guanshanhu Water Park, Fushun
  - Hunhe Water Park, Shenyang
  - Puhe Water Park, Shenyang
  - Tieling Fanhe Water Park
  - Harqin Zuoyi Longyuanhu Water Park
  - Fushun Hunhe Urban Area Water Park
  - Xinglongtai Liaohe Dingxiang Water Park
- Jilin
  - Xinlihu Water Park
  - Yalujiang International Border Resort, Ji'an
  - Huanghe Shuiku Park, Panshi
  - Shitoukoumen Shuiku Water Park, Changchun
  - Taoyuanhu Water Park, Tonghua
  - Liangjiashan Water Park, Shulan
  - Jingyuetan Shuiku Park, Changchun
  - Julongtan Eco-Resort, Dongliao
  - Qagan Hu Water Park
  - Mopanhu Water Park, Meihekou
  - Changbai Shiwudaogou Water Park
  - Burhatonghe Water Park, Yanji
  - Longkeng Water Park, Songyuan
  - Songhuajiang Qingshui Lüdai Water Park, Jilin
  - Nenshuiyunbai Water Park, Baicheng
  - Erlonghu Water Park, Siping
  - Shahe Shuiku Water Park
  - Longfenghu Water Park, Changling
  - Ciluhu Water Park, Dongliao
  - Hadashan Water Park, Songyuan
  - Longmenhu Water Park, Helong
  - Helong Tumenjiangliuyu Hongqihe Water Park
  - Songyuan Yanjiang Water Park
  - Da'an Niuxintaobao Water Park
  - Baicheng Nenjiangwan Water Park
  - Yongji Xingxingshao Water Park
  - Tongyu Xianghai Water Park
  - Linjiang Yalujiang Water Park
  - Jilin Xin'an Shuiku Water Park
  - Changchun Shuangyanghu Water Park
  - Siping Zhuanshanhu Water Park
  - Yanbian Longjing Hailanjiang Water Park
- Heilongjiang
  - Hongqipao Shuiku Honghu Resort
  - Longfengshan Water Park, Wuchang
  - Shankouhu Water Park, Wudalianchi
  - Yinhehu Water Park, Gannan
  - Laodonghu Water Park, Qiqihar
  - Liushudao Water Park, Jiamusi
  - Helihu Water Park, Hegang
  - Xingkaihu Flood Sluice No.2 Water Park, General Bureau of State Farms of Heilongjiang Province
  - Taiyangdao Water Park, Harbin
  - Xingkaihu Dangbi Water Park
  - Baiyupao Water Park, Harbin
  - Fabiela Water Park. Heihe
  - Qingnian Shuiku Water Park, Mishan
  - Ermenshan Shuiku Water Park, Sunwu
  - Hongxing Shidi Water Park, Yichun
  - Shangganling Water Park, Yichun
  - Wolonghu Water Park, Yichun
  - Wuyiling Water Park, Yichun
  - Xinqing Shidi Water Park, Yichun
  - Yichunhe Water Park, Yichun
  - Xiquanyan Water Park, Harbin
  - ~~Hulan Fuqiang Water Park, Harbin~~ (revoked on December 8, 2023)
  - Jinhewan Water Park, Harbin
  - Heiyuhu Water Park, Daqing
  - Qingyuanhu Water Park, Hegang
  - Binshui Xinqu Water Park, Yichun
  - Hekou Water Park, Lanxi
  - Yichun Huilongwan Water Park
  - Tailai Taihu Water Park
  - Harbin Changshouhu Water Park
  - Hulanhekou Water Park
  - Tieli Hulanhe Water Park
  - Hulin Wusulijiang Water Park
- Shanghai
  - Shanghai Songjiang Eco-Water Park
  - Dianshanhu Park
  - Bihai Jinsha Water Park
  - Dishuihu Water Park, Pudong
  - Huangpujiang Xuhui Binjiang Water Park
- Jiangsu
  - Tianmuhu Resort, Liyang
  - Jiangdu Hydro-Junction Resort
  - Yunlonghu Park, Xuzhou
  - Guazhou Ancient Ferry Park
  - Sanhezha Water Park
  - Taizhou Yinjianghe Park
  - Suzhou Xukou Water Park
  - Huai'an Hydro-Junction Park
  - Guyunhe Water Park, Huai'an
  - Tongyuhe Junction Park, Yancheng
  - Qinhu Park, Jiangyan
  - Jinniuhu Water Park, Nanjing
  - Hengshan Shuiku Water Park, Yixing
  - Wuxi Meilianghu Water Park
  - Fenghuanghe Water Park, Taizhou
  - Waiqinhuaihe Water Park, Nanjing
  - Zhongyunhe Water Park, Suqian
  - Guhuanghe Water Park, Xuzhou
  - Jincanghu Water Park, Taicang
  - Zhenzhuquan Water Park, Nanjing
  - Tianshengqiaohe Water Park, Nanjing
  - Aishan Jiulong Water Park, Pizhou
  - Xiaotashan Shuiku Water Park, Ganyu
  - Yinghuayuan Water Park, Huai'an
  - Longyou Water Park, Rugao
  - Changguangxi Water Park, Wuxi
  - Huaguoshan Dashenghu Water Park, Lianyungang
  - Baoyinghu Water Park, Baoying
  - Dazonghu Water Park, Yancheng
  - Sishuihe Water Park, Siyang
  - Tianquanhu Water Park, Xuyi
  - Qingyanyuan Water Park, Huai'an
  - Guhuaihe Water Park, Huai'an
  - Wangshan Water Park, Suzhou
  - Huanchenghe Water Park, Zhangjiagang
  - Fenghuangdao Water Park, Yangzhou
  - Pan'anhu Water Park, Xuzhou
  - Hailinghu Water Park, Lianyungang
  - Jinlonghu Water Park, Xuzhou Economic Development Zone
  - Jintan Yuchiwan Water Park
  - Kunshan Mingjingdang Water Park
  - Zhenjiang Jinshanhu Water Park
  - Lianghong Water Park, Wuxi New District
  - Suqian Sucheng Guhuanghe Water Park
  - Liyang Nanshan Zhuhai Water Park
  - Jiangyin Furonghu Water Park
  - Xuzhou Dingwanhu Water Park
  - Jinhu Hehuadang Water Park
  - Funing Jinshahu Water Park
  - Suqian Liutanghe Water Park
  - Yangzhou Guyunhe Water Park (alt. Ancient Canal)
  - Nanjing Xuanwuhu Water Park
  - Jurong Chishanhu Water Park
  - Yixing Zhuhai Water Park
  - Changzhou Yandanghe Water Park
  - Taizhou Fengchenghe Water Park
  - Yixing Huadongbaichang Water Park
  - Lianshui Wudaohu Water Park
  - Changzhou Qinglongtan Water Park
  - Taizhou Qianduo Water Park
  - Xuzhou Dashahe Water Park
  - Nanjing Chuhe (Pukou Section) Water Park
  - Jinhu Sanhewan Water Park
  - Yixing Yangxianhu Water Park
  - Nanjing Pukou Xiangshanhu Water Park
  - Wujin Gehu Water Park
  - Zaohe Shuniu Water Park
- Zhejiang
  - Qianjiang Chaoyun Resort Village, Haining
  - Ningbo Tianhe Eco-Park
  - Tingxiahu Resort, Fenghua
  - Huzhou Taihu Resort
  - Tianfu Resort, Anji
  - Hangzhouwan Seaside Amusement Park, Cixi
  - Xialihu Eco-Park, Jiangshan
  - Wozhouhu Water Park, Xinchang
  - Huanchenghe Park, Shaoxing
  - Jiangshan Yuelianghu Water Park
  - Yaojiang Park, Yuyao
  - Tiantaishan Longchuanxia Water Park
  - Yunhe Garden along the Shaoxing Section of Ancient Zhedong Canal
  - Jiangnan Tianchi Water Park, Anji
  - Cao'ejiang City Defense Water Park, Shangyu
  - Yuhuan Water Park, Yuhuan
  - Nanminghu Water Park, Lishui
  - Laoshikan Shuiku Water Park, Anji
  - Cao'ejiang Dazha Water Park, Shaoxing
  - Qiongtai Xiangu Water Park, Tiantai
  - Wuxijiang Water Park, Quzhou
  - Fuchunjiang Water Park, Fuyang
  - Xin'anhu Water Park, Quzhou
  - Shibalicui Water Park, Suichang
  - Fuchunjiang Water Park, Tonglu
  - Songyinxi Water Park, Songyang
  - Shexiang Lülang Water Park, Jingning
  - Ningbo Dongqianhu Water Park
  - Yueqing Zhongyandangshan Water Park
  - Yongjia Huangtanxi Water Park
  - Huzhou Wuxing Taihu Lougang Water Park
  - Yunhe Titian Water Park
  - Jinhua Puyangjiang Water Park
  - Jinhua Zhezhong Daxiagu Water Park
  - Quzhou Majinxi Water Park
  - Jiaxing Haiyan Yulin Haitang Water Park (alt. Yulin Sea Embankment)
  - Huzhou Wuxing Xishanyang Water Park
  - Jinyun Haoxi Water Park
  - Jiande Xin'anjiang - Fuchunjiang Water Park
  - Lishui Oujiangyuan - Longquanxi Water Park
  - Jinhua Meixi Water Park
  - Deqing Luosheyang Water Park
  - Wenzhou Pingyang Aojiang Water Park
  - Jinhua Wucheng Baishaxi Water Park
- Anhui
  - Longhekou Water Resort
  - Taipinghu Park
  - Foziling Shuiku Park
  - Longzihu Park
  - Meishan Shuiku Water Park
  - Xianghongdian Shuiku Water Park
  - Huatinghu Water Park, Taihu
  - Huaihe Bengbuzha Junction Water Park
  - Qinglongwan Water Park
  - Hengpaitou Water Park, Lu'an
  - Shuimentang Water Park, Huoqiu
  - Luhu Zhuhai Water Park, Guangde
  - Taohuatan Park, Jingxian
  - Bawangshan Yaoling Xiushui Water Park, Shexian
  - Huaishang Mingzhu Water Park, Fengtai
  - Huaihe Linhuaigang Engineering Project Water Park
  - Bailuzhou Water Park, Bozhou
  - Wangjiaba Water Park, Funan
  - Jiaoganghu Water Park, Huainan
  - Shifoshan Tianzihu Water Park, Langxi
  - Huangshan Shimen Water Park
  - Binjiang Water Park, Wuhu
  - Pihe Water Park, Lu'an
  - Tianxia Water Park, Yuexi
  - Bailudao Water Park, Lai'an
  - Quanjiao Xianghe Water Park
  - Yuexi Dabieshan Caihong Pubu Water Park
  - Yingshang Balihe Water Park
  - Feidong Daishanhu Water Park
  - Hefei Binhu Water Park
  - Lu'an Youranlanxi Water Park
  - Xiuning Hengjiang Water Park
  - Chizhou Jiuhua Tianchi Water Park
  - Wangjiang Guleichi Water Park
  - Yixian Hongcun - Qishuhu Water Park
  - Suzhou Xinbianhe Water Park
  - Wuhu Taoxin Shuiyun Water Park
  - Chizhou Xinghuacun Water Park
  - Jinzhai Yanzihe Daxiagu Water Park
  - Feixi Sanhe Water Park
  - Nanling Dapu Water Park
  - Qimen Guniujiang Water Park
  - Tongling Tianjinghu Water Park
- Fujian
  - Dongzhang Shuiku Shizhuhu Park, Fuqing
  - Jiulihu Park, Xianyou
  - Yanpinghu Park, Nanping
  - Taoyuandong Water Park, Yong'an
  - Tianmenshan Water Park, Yongtai
  - Daixianhu Water Park, Dehua
  - Minhu Water Park, Youxi
  - Meihuahu Water Park, Longyan
  - Jiulongjiang Water Park, Hua'an
  - Longhu Water Park, Yongding
  - Jiupengxi Water Park, Zhangping
  - Shanmei Shuiku Water Park, Quanzhou
  - Nantaiwu Xin'gangcheng Water Park, Zhangzhou Development Zone
  - Mulanbei Water Park, Putian
  - Taining Water Park, Sanming
  - Huayangshan Water Park, Shunchang
  - Donghu Water Park, Wuyishan
  - Nanjing Tulou Shuixiang Water Park
  - Shaowu Yunlingshan Water Park
  - Ningde Donghu Water Park
  - Quanzhou Jinji River Sluice Water Park
  - Liancheng Guanzhishan Water Park (locally pronounced Guanzhaishan)
  - Yongchun Taoxi Water Park
  - Shaowu Tiancheng Qixia Water Park
  - Xiamen Tianzhushan Water Park
  - Zherong Qinglanhu Water Park
  - Water Park in Taiwan Farmers Entrepreneurial Park of Zhangping
  - Putian Jiulonggu Water Park
  - Wuping Liangyeshan Yuncaxi Water Park
  - Ningde Yangzhong Water Park
  - Yongchun Jinjiangyuan Water Park
  - Water Park in Changting Soil and Water Conservation Scientific Education Park
  - Ningde Shuiyunjiudu Water Park
  - Xiapu Yangjiaxi Water Park
  - Shouning Xipu Water Park
  - Ningde Huotong Water Park
  - Quanzhou Longmenhu Water Park
  - Yongchun Waishan Yunhegu Water Park
  - Nanping Kaoting Water Park
  - Jiangbin Water Park in Shanghang Urban Area
  - Dehua Yinpinghu Water Park
  - Changting Yanggu Tingjiang Water Park
- Jiangxi
  - Shangyouhu Park
  - Yutianhu Water Park, Jingdezhen
  - Baihehu Water Park, Guixi
  - Jinggangshanhu Water Park, Jinggangshan
  - Tanhu Water Park, Nanfeng
  - Cuipinghu Water Park, Leping
  - Mayuan Sangu Water Park, Nancheng
  - Bailuhu Water Park, Taihe
  - Feijiantan Water Park, Yichun
  - Fengzehu Park, Shangrao
  - Sanjiang Water Park, Ganzhou
  - Jiulonghu Water Park, Tonggu
  - Wugonghu Water Park, Anfu
  - Yuelianghu Water Park, Jingdezhen
  - Zhangling Shuiku Water Park, Duchang
  - Mingyuehu Water Park, Pingxiang
  - Hanxianhu Water Park, Huichang
  - Water Park in Ganfu Pingyuan Irrigation Area
  - Luhu Water Park, Xingzi
  - Yuanminghu Water Park, Yifeng
  - Mengshan Shuiku Water Park, Xinjian
  - Xixia Shuiku Water Park, Xinjian
  - Taohuayuan Water Park, Wuning
  - Lushanxihai Water Park, Jiujiang
  - Qunying Shuiku Water Park, Wannian
  - Sanqinghu Water Park, Yushan
  - Tongboshan Jiuxianhu Water Park, Guangfeng
  - Yiyang Guifenghu Water Park
  - Dexing Fenghuanghu Water Park
  - Ningdu Ganjiangyuan Water Park
  - Xingan Huangnibu Shuiku Water Park
  - Ji'an Luotan Water Park
  - Wuning Xihaiwan Water Park
  - Water Park in Jiangxi Soil and Water Conservation Ecological Science and Technology Park of De'an
  - Ruijin Chenshihu Water Park
  - Nancheng Zuixianhu Water Park
  - Ji'an Qingyuan Chanxi Water Park
  - Yiyang Longmenhu Water Park
  - Shicheng Qinjiang Water Park
  - Chongyi Kejia Titian Water Park
  - Dexing Damaoshan Shuangxihu Water Park
  - Yichun Henghui Water Park
  - Fuzhou Dajueshan Water Park
  - Ji'an Xiajiang Shuilishuniu Water Park (alt. Xiajiang Hydro Junction)
  - Yihuang Caoshan Water Park
  - Xinyu Bama Water Park
  - Le'an Jiupuxia Water Park
  - Taihe Chatanbei Water Park
  - Water Park in Poyanghu Hydro-Ecological Science and Technology Park
  - Water Park in Liaohe Irrigation Area
- Shandong
  - Yimeng Lake
  - Dongying Tian'ehu Park
  - Jiangbei Shuicheng Park
  - Weihe Water Park, Zhucheng
  - Tianpinghu Park, Tai'an
  - Xianyuehu Park, Changle
  - Qingfenghu Park, Dongying
  - Wenhe Water Park, Anqiu
  - Mihe Water Park, Shouguang
  - Zhonghai Water Park, Binzhou
  - Dongcunhe Water Park, Haiyang
  - Jiaozhou Sanlihe Water Park
  - Luoshenhu Water Park, Dong'e
  - Sunwuhu Water Park, Guangrao
  - Ezhuang Soil and Water Conservation Eco-Park, Zibo
  - ~~Laixihu Water Park, Laixi~~ (revoked on December 8, 2023)
  - Baodugu Guishehu Water Park, Zaozhuang
  - Weishanhu Shidi Honghe Water Park, Tengzhou
  - Kangwanghe Park, Feicheng
  - Yuqiuhu Water Park, Gaotang
  - Weihe Water Park, Changyi
  - Xiashanhu Water Park, Weifang
  - Matahu Water Park, Huantai
  - Yanmahu Water Park, Zaozhuang
  - Bailanghe Water Park, Weifang
  - Tai'erzhuang Yunhe Water Park, Zaozhuang
  - Taigonghu Water Park, Zibo
  - Qinkouhe Water Park, Zhanhua
  - Tangshuiya Shuiku Water Park, Linqu
  - Qianshenghu Water Park, Gaoqing
  - Jiaohe Water Park, Gaomi
  - Qingyunhu Water Park, Xintai
  - Zhuohe Water Park, Weifang
  - Baolonghe Water Park, Wendeng
  - Shaohai Water Park, Jiaozhou
  - Xueyehu Water Park, Laiwu
  - Tianyihu Water Park, Tai'an
  - Dongpinghu Water Park, Dongping
  - Zhaowanghe Water Park, Heze
  - Sanhehu Water Park, Binzhou
  - Tianmadao Water Park, Junan
  - Water Park in Xiaokaihe Irrigation Area
  - Yiheyuan Water Park, Yiyuan
  - Wuyanghu Water Park, Zibo
  - Renhe Shuiku Water Park, Qingzhou
  - Yishan Dongzhenhu Water Park, Linqu
  - Wulonghe Water Park, Laiyang
  - Juyuhu Water Park, Rushan
  - Zhuquan Water Park, Yinan
  - Fulonghu Water Park, Shanxian
  - Guchenghe Water Park, Huimin
  - Huanghedao Water Park, Wudi
  - Wangwu Shuiku Water Park, Longkou
  - Changchunhu Water Park, Qixia
  - Wanziqianhong Water Park, Sishui
  - Darushan Water Park, Rushan
  - Daixihe Water Park, Zouping
  - Jindu Longwanghu Water Park, Zhaoyuan
  - Tuhaihe Siyuanhu Water Park, Zhanhua
  - Huanghe Gudao Water Park, Xiajin
  - Dayuzhang Yinhuangguanqu Water Park, Boxing
  - Xiuyuanhe Water Park, Zhangqiu
  - Changqinghu Water Park, Jinan
  - Weishanhu Water Park, Weishan
  - Chenghe Water Park, Zaozhuang
  - Qufu Yihe Water Park
  - Jining Liaohe Water Park
  - Qingzhou Mihe Water Park
  - Shanxian Donggouhe Green Ecological Gallery Water Park
  - Chiping Jinniuhu Water Park
  - Binzhou Qinhuanghe Water Park
  - Shouguang Judianhu Water Park
  - Yantai Zhifu Dagujiahe Water Park
  - Yucheng Da Yu Culture Water Park
  - Juye Zhushuihe Water Park
  - Yantai Muping Qinshuihe Water Park
  - Water Park in Handun Yellow River Irrigation Area of Binzhou
  - Linqu Mihe Water Park
  - Zouping Yinghuashan Water Park
  - Jinxiang Jinshuihu Water Park
  - Liaocheng Lianhu Water Park
  - Tai'an Culaishan Wenhe Water Park
  - Xiajin Jiulongkou Shidi Water Park
  - Rencheng Nanchi Water Park
  - Feicheng Longshanhe Water Park
  - Chengwu Wentinghu Water Park
  - Junan Jilonghe Water Park
  - Jinxiang Yangshanhu Water Park
  - Yucheng Tuhaihe Water Park
  - Juxian Shuhe Water Park
  - Qingzhou Yanghe Water Park
  - Yihe Water Park, Yishui
  - Dezhou Daqinghe Water Park
  - Linyi Yishuhe Water Park
  - Yishui Xueshan Caihonggu Water Park
  - Water Park in Weishan Irrigation Area of Liaocheng
  - Tancheng Shuhe Water Park
  - Jining Yanzhou Sihe Water Park
  - Yinan Shuangquanhe Water Park
- Henan
  - Nanwan Park
  - Boshanhu Water Resort, Zhumadian
  - Yuntaishan Water Park
  - Zhaopinghu Park
  - Qunyinghu Park, Jiaozuo
  - Bo'ai Qingtianhe Park
  - Zhaikou Shuiku Park, Lingbao
  - Hongqi Channel
  - Tongshanhu Water Park
  - Xiangshanhu Water Park
  - Nianyushan Shuiku Park
  - Shimenhu Water Park, Xixia
  - Longshanhu Park, Guangshan
  - Baisha Shuiku Water Park
  - Wanghuahu Water Park, Fangcheng
  - Zhangwu Nanhai Shuiku Water Park, Anyang
  - Pohe Water Park, Xinyang
  - Suyahu Water Park, Zhumadian
  - Canghe Water Park, Weihui
  - Luhunhu Water Park
  - Shalihe Water Park, Luohe
  - Longwanggou Water Park, Nanyang
  - Beihu Water Park, Xinyang
  - Huanghe Gudao Shidi Water Park, Shangqiu
  - Yahekou Shuiku Water Park, Nanyang
  - Huanghe Eco-Water Park, Zhengzhou
  - Ronghu Water Park, Zhecheng
  - Shangqiu Gucheng Water Park, Shangqiu
  - Banqiao Shuiku Water Park, Zhumadian
  - Yinghe Water Park, Yuzhou
  - Wuzhi Jiayingguan Huanghe Water Park
  - Yongcheng Tuohe Riyuehu Water Park
  - Huaiyang Longhu Water Park
  - Minquan Huanghe Gudao Water Park
  - Suixian Beihu Eco-Water Park
  - Xuchang Caowei Gudu Water Park
  - Yucheng Xianghe Water Park
  - Xingyang Gubaidu South-to-North Water Diversion Yellow River Under-crossing Water Park
  - Linzhou Taihangpinghu Water Park
  - Nanle Xihu Eco-Water Park
  - Jiyuan Qinlongxia Water Park
  - Xuchang Heminghu Water Park
  - Zhengzhou Longhu Water Park
  - Ruzhou Beiruhe Water Park
  - Anyang Tanghe Water Park
- Hubei
  - Zhanghe Park
  - Longlingong Park
  - Jingshan Huitinghu Park
  - Sandaohe Shuijinghu Park, Xiangyang
  - Wenxiahu Water Park, Zhongxiang
  - Weishui Water Park, Jingzhou
  - Wuhan Xiajiasi Water Park
  - Jiangtan Water Park, Wuhan
  - Guanyinhu Water Park, Xiaochang
  - Tiantanghu Water Park, Luotian
  - Bishenghu Water Park, Yingshan
  - Fushuihu Water Park, Tongshan
  - Qingjiang Water Park, Changyang
  - Macheng Fuqiaohe Water Park
  - Yunxi Tianhe Water Park
  - Jingzhou Beizha Water Park
  - Huanggang Bailianhe Water Park
  - Yichang Bailihuang Water Park
  - Macheng Mingshan Water Park
  - Wuhan Jinyinhu Water Park
  - Qichun Datong Shuiku Water Park
  - Wuxue Meichuan Shuiku Water Park
  - Qianjiang Tianguandao Water Park
  - Yichang Gaolanhe Water Park
  - Shiyan Taihe Meihuagu Water Park
  - Xingshan Nanyanghe Water Park
  - Yuan'an Huilongwan Water Park
  - Qianjiang Xinglong Water Park
  - Xiangyang Yindanqu Water Park
- Hunan
  - Zhangjiajie Loujiang Park
  - Hunan Shuifu Water Park
  - Jiulongtan Daxiagu Water Park
  - Hengdong Mishui Water Park
  - Changsha Xiangjiang Water Park
  - Jiubujiang Water Park
  - Yuxingshan Water Park, Yiyang
  - Bianjiang Water Park, Yongxing
  - Qianlonghu Eco-Resort Village, Changsha
  - Dalongdong Water Park, Xiangxi
  - Yangmingshan Water Park, Shuangpai
  - Zaoshi Water Park
  - Changtangang Water Park, Fenghuang
  - Jiuguanhu Water Park, Hengshan
  - Zhinühu Water Park, Hengyang
  - Huangcai Shuiku Water Park, Changsha
  - Ziquejie Water Park, Xinhua
  - Qingnian Shuiku Water Park, Shaoshan
  - Xiepiyan Shuiku Water Park, Hengyang
  - Huayuan Biancheng Water Park, Huayuan
  - Cailun Zhuhai Water Park, Leiyang
  - Wangjiachang Water Park, Lixian
  - Yanzidong Water Park, Chenxi
  - Liuyehu Water Park, Changde
  - Huangjiahu Water Park, Yiyang
  - Xiaoxiangyuan Water Park, Jianghua
  - Water Park in Shaoshan Irrigation Area of Xiangtan
  - Hanshou Qingshuihu Water Park
  - Zixing Dongjianghu Water Park
  - Jiangyong Qianjiadong Water Park
  - Yongxing Qingshanlong - Longtan Water Park
  - Lanshan Xiangjiangyuan Water Park
  - Wangcheng Bandao Water Park
  - Rucheng Reshuihe Water Park
  - Chenzhou Siqinghu Water Park
  - Lianyuan Yangjiatan Water Park
  - Hepinghu Water Park, Zhijiang
  - Changsha Yanghu Shidi Water Park
  - Qiyang Wuxi Water Park
  - Zhuzhou Xiangjiang Scenic Belt Water Park
  - Yongzhou Jindong Baishuihe Water Park
  - Zhuzhou Wanfenghu Water Park
- Guangdong
  - Feilaixia Hydro Junction Resort
  - Yuhu Park, Maoming
  - Xiaoliang Soil and Water Conservation Eco-Park, Maoming
  - Huizhou Baipenhu Eco-Park
  - Huaihua Wulongxi Water Park
  - Dongtianhu Water Park, Meizhou
  - Yitang Shuiku Water Park, Wuhua
  - Huangchuan Sanxia Water Park, Lianzhou
  - Zengjiang Hualang Water Park, Zengcheng
  - Danxiayuan Water Park, Renhua
  - Zhuhai Zhuzhou Shuixian Water Park
  - Guangzhou Baiyunhu Water Park
  - Zhanjiang Hedi Yinhu Water Park
  - Guangzhou Huaduhu Water Park
  - Foshan Lecong Water Park
- Guangxi
  - Chengbihe Water Park, Bose
  - Hongchaojiang Water Park, Beihai
  - Nanning Dawangtan Water Park
  - Nanning Tianbao Shuiku Water Park
  - Jianhe Water Park, Debao
  - Yuedaohu Water Park, Luzhai
  - Bachuanhe Dixia Daxiagu Water Park, Nandan
  - Rongjiang Hegu Water Park, Liucheng
  - Xiangjiang Water Park, Xiangzhou
  - Jingxi Longtan Equan Water Park
  - Du'an Chengjiang Water Park
  - Guilin Lingqu Water Park
  - Longlin Wanfenghu Water Park
  - Guigang Jiulinghu Water Park
  - Yongfu Sanjiang Liu'an Water Park
- Hainan
  - Songtao Shuiku Park
  - Nanlihu Water Park, Ding'an
  - Qionghai Heshui Shuiku Water Park
  - Baoting Maozhen Shuiku (Shenyudao) Water Park
  - Haikou Meishehe Water Park
- Chongqing
  - Longshuihu Park, Dazu
  - Qingxigou Water Park, Jiangjin
  - Dagou Shuiku Water Park, Bishan
  - Shuanglonghu Water Park, Hechuan
  - Xiaonanhai Water Park, Qianjiang
  - Shanhuguan Shuiku Water Park, Wulong
  - Congkan Shuiku Water Park, Tongnan
  - Longhe Water Park, Shizhu
  - Nanbinlu Water Park
  - Qinjian Shuiku Water Park, Yongchuan
  - Hanfenghu Water Park, Kaixian
  - Bishan Bi'nanhe Water Park
  - Wulong Yangshuihe Water Park
  - Rongchang Rongfenghe Water Park
  - Fengdu Longhegu Water Park
- Sichuan
  - Xianhai Park
  - Lubanhu Park
  - Baishuihu Park, Anxian
  - Shuangxihu Park, Zigong
  - Jianshan Water Park, Zigong
  - Luguhu Water Park, Liangshan
  - Jiangkou Shuixiang Water Park, Pingchang
  - Dashen Nanhai Water Park, Peng'an
  - Dujiangyan Water Park
  - Shuimo Zangzhai Water Park, Wenchuan
  - Fujiang Liuxia Water Park, Mianyang
  - Heilongtan Water Park, Meishan
  - Guyumiao Shuiku Water Park, Longchang
  - Shengzhonghu Water Park, Nanchong
  - Bailuhu Water Park, Cangxi
  - Qinglonghu Water Park, Xichong
  - Qiongjiangyuan Water Park, Suining
  - Leshan Daduhe Jinkou Daxiagu Water Park
  - Ebian Da- Xiao-dujuanchi Water Park
  - Qianwei Suoluohu Water Park
  - Peng'an Jialing Diyisangzi Water Park (Jialing Diyisangzi: “Number One Hometown in the [river basin of] Jialing”, in memory of Sima Xiangru, a great prose poet of the Western Han dynasty)
  - Langzhong Jinshahu Water Park
  - Qingchuan Qingzhujiang Water Park
  - Wusheng Taijihu Water Park
  - Jinkouhe Dawashan Wuchi Water Park
  - Dazhu Baidaohu Water Park
  - Kaijiang Baoshiqiao Shuiku Water Park
  - Ya'an Feixianhu Water Park
  - Neijiang Huanghehu Water Park
  - Bazhong Huahu Water Park
  - Guang'an Baiyunhu Water Park
  - Xichang Qionghai Water Park
  - Luzhou Zhangba Water Park
  - Zamtang Raqu He Water Park
  - Nanbu Hongyanzihu Water Park
  - Guang'an Huayingshan Tianchihu Water Park
  - Ya'an Longxihe Shangli Guzhen Water Park
  - Nanjiang Yuhu Water Park
  - Suining Guanyinhu Water Park
  - Liangshan Anninghu Water Park
  - Guang'an Tianyigu Water Park
  - Bazhong Liujinhu Water Park
  - Miyi Miyanghu Water Park
  - Huili Xianrenhu Water Park
  - Tongjiang Dongjun Shuixiang Water Park
  - Hongya Yanyuliujiang Water Park
  - Yilong Baiyanghu Water Park
  - Jiange Cuiyunhu Water Park
  - Deyang Linguquan Water Park
- Guizhou
  - Zhenyuan Wuyanghe Water Resort
  - Zhijin Konglonghu Water Resort
  - Cengong Long'aohe Water Park
  - Sanchahe Water Park
  - Wuyanghu Water Park
  - Dujuanhu Park
  - Bijie Tianhe Water Park
  - Songbaishan Water Park
  - Longli Eco-Tech Demonstration Park
  - Jinmang Linhai Water Park, Guiyang
  - Minghu Water Park, Liupanshui
  - Muchenghe Water Park, Guanling
  - Dabanshui Water Park, Zunyi
  - Yonglehu Water Park, Guiyang
  - Wujiang Shanxia Water Park, Yanhe
  - Gaoyuan Qiandaohu Water Park, Luodian
  - Lianjiang Water Park, Huishui
  - Yang'ashahu Water Park, Jianhe
  - Jinjiang Water Park, Tongren
  - Wuyanghe Water Park, Shibing
  - Zhijinguan Water Park, Zhijin
  - Longli Lianhua Water Park
  - Jinping Sanjiang Water Park
  - Sinan Wujiang Water Park
  - Suiyang Shuangmenxia Water Park
  - Dafang Shexiang Jiuyi Water Park
  - Weining Caohai Water Park
  - Kaiyang Qinglonghe Water Park
  - Kaili Qingshuijiang Water Park
  - Fuquan Sajingu Water Park
  - Guiding Jinhaixueshan Water Park
  - Tongren Baiyanhe Water Park
  - Zunyi Maotaidu Water Park
  - Yongjiang Water Park, Qiannan
  - Qiandongnan Tianzhu Qingshuijiang Baili Hualang Water Park
- Yunnan
  - Zhujiangyuan Park
  - Wuzhe Hot Spring Park, Luxi
  - Meizihu Water Park, Pu'er
  - Mianyangchong Resort Village, Jianshui
  - Ximu Shuiku Park, Jinggu
  - Alahu Park, Luxi
  - Kongquehu Eco-Park, Mangshi
  - Mengsuo Longtan Water Park, Ximeng
  - Beimiaohu Water Park, Baoshan
  - Cibihu Water Park, Eryuan
  - Aluhu Water Park, Luxi
  - Bailonghu Water Park, Qiubei
  - Ximahe Water Park, Pu'er
  - Lashihai Water Park, Yulong, Lijiang
  - Junlonghu Water Park, Wenshan
  - Qinghaihu Water Park, Xiangyun
  - Yiliang Jiuxiang Mingyuehu Water Park
  - Lincang Bingdao Water Park
  - Shuangbai Chamuhu Water Park
  - Qiubei Nalonghu Water Park
  - Lijiang Liyuhe Water Park
  - Dayao Qinglinghu Water Park
  - Qingshanhu Water Park, Chuxiong
  - Honghe Mile Dianxihe Water Park
- Tibet
  - Comogyiri Hu Water Park, Nyingchi
  - Yarlung Hegu Water Park, Nêdong
  - Lhasa He Water Park, Lhasa
- Shaanxi
  - Jinyanghu Eco-Park
  - Hanzhong Shimen Water Park
  - Huanghehun Eco-Resort
  - Yinghu Park, Ankang
  - Hongsihu Park, Nanzheng
  - Youyihu Recreational Mountain Resort, Weinan
  - Xi'an Aoti Bahe Water Park (Xi'an Aoti: Xi'an Olympic Sports Center)
  - Danjiang Water Park, Shangluo
  - Nanshahu Water Park, Chenggu
  - Zhengguoqu Water Park
  - Longjuzhai Water Park, Danfeng
  - Jialingjiangyuan Water Park, Fengxian
  - Qianhu Water Park, Baoji
  - Hanchenghu Water Park, Xi'an
  - Weishuizhiyang Water Park, Baoji
  - Jinsi Daxiagu Water Park, Shangnan
  - Huangbaiyuan Water Park, Taibai
  - Cuihuashan Water Park, Xi'an
  - Baqiao Shidi Water Park, Xi'an
  - Huanghe Hukou Water Park, Yichuan
  - Hongjiannao Water Park, Shenmu
  - Huxian Qinglongxia Water Park
  - Taibai Qingfengxia Water Park
  - Heyang Qiachuan Water Park (Qiachuan: locally pronounced Hechuan)
  - Danfeng Taohuagu Water Park
  - Zhashui Qianyouheyuan Water Park
  - Water Park in Xi'an Expo Park
  - Qishan Qiwei Water Park
  - Hanyin Fengyan Ancient Terraced Field Water Park
  - Baoji Taibaishan Water Park
  - Fengdong Fenghe Water Park
  - Weinan Luyanghu Water Park
  - Meixian Bawei Guanzhong Culture Water Park
  - Langao Qiancenghe Water Park
  - Mizhi Gaoxigou Water Park
  - Yanchuan Qiankunwan Water Park
  - Xi'an Weihe Eco-Water Park
  - Zhenping Feiduxia Water Park
  - Ankang Renhe Water Park
  - Xi'an Qujiangchi - Datang Furongyuan Water Park (Datang Furongyuan: a cultural theme park officially known as Tang Paradise in English)
  - Xi'an Huchenghe Water Park (alt. Xi'an Moat)
  - Jiaxian Baiyunshan Water Park
- Gansu
  - Yuanyangchi Water Park, Jinta
  - Liangzhou Tiantishan Water Park
  - Kongtong Shuiku Park, Pingliang
  - Chijinxia Water Park, Jiuquan
  - Dahuwan Park, Gaotai
  - Zhulinsi Shuiku Park, Zhuanglang
  - Tianjiagou Soil and Water Conservation Eco-Park, Jingchuan
  - Yuyuan Water Park
  - Guazhouyuan Water Park, Guazhou
  - Shuangquanhu Water Park, Linze
  - Erbahu Water Park, Zhangye
  - ~~Dayekou Shuiku Water Park, Zhangye~~ (revoked on December 8, 2023)
  - Wanxiahu Water Park, Xihe
  - Pingchuan Shuiku Water Park, Linze
  - Liqiao Shuiku Water Park, Shandan
  - Jinshanhu Water Park, Aksay
  - Bailongjiang Lazikou Water Park, Têwo
  - Yeliguan Water Park, Lintan
  - Hongyashan Shuiku Water Park, Minqin
  - Danghe Fengqingxian Water Park, Dunhuang
  - Huanghe Shouqu Water Park, Maqu
  - Yangba Water Park, Kangxian
  - Taohe Water Park, Jonê
  - Liangdang Yunpinghe Water Park
  - Chongxin Longzehu Water Park
  - Sunan Longchanghe Fengqingxian Water Park
  - Qingyanghu Water Park, Qingyang
  - Jingdian Water Park (Jiangdian: Jingtaichuan Electric Pumping Irrigation [Enjineering Project])
  - Qingyang Xifeng Qingshuigou Water Park
- Qinghai
  - Nanmenxia Shuiku Park, Huzhu
  - Changlinggou Park
  - Huanghe Zoulang Water Park, Huangnan
  - Mengda Tianchi Water Park, Xunhua
  - Heiquan Shuiku Water Park
  - Beishan Water Park, Huzhu
  - Nyainboyuzê Water Park, Jigzhi
  - Sanchuan Huanghe Water Park, Minhe
  - Huangheyuan Water Park, Madoi
  - Lancangjiang Water Park, Nangqên
  - Bayan He Water Park, Haixi
  - Jinzihai Water Park, Ulan
  - Yushu Tongtianhe Water Park
- Ningxia
  - Qingtongxia Tanglaizha Park
  - Shapotou Water Park
  - Diannonghe Water Park, Yinchuan
  - Xinghaihu Water Park, Shizuishan
  - Yazidang Water Park, Lingwu
  - Shahu Water Park
  - Tengger Shidi Water Park, Zhongwei
  - Ruhe Water Park, Pengyang
  - Qingliuhe Water Park, Longde
  - Mingcuihu Water Park, Yinchuan
  - Pengyang Yangwa Liuyu Water Park
  - Yinchuan Huanghe Hengcheng Water Park
- Xinjiang
  - Kizil Shuiku Park
  - Xihaiwan Mingzhu Park, Bayingolin
  - Kax He Longkou Water Park, Ili
  - Uluwat Water Park
  - Karez Water Park, Turpan
  - Tacheng Karangur Water Park
  - Shimenzi Shuiku Water Park, Changji
  - Qianquanhu Water Park, Shawan
  - Tianshan Tianchi Water Park
  - Kurdenin Water Park, Gongliu
  - Dawakol Shamo Water Park, Yopurga
  - Yehetaogou Water Park, Gongliu
  - Kashi Tuman He Water Park
- Xinjiang Production and Construction Corps
  - Shihezi Beihu Resort, XPCC Eighth Division
  - Qinggedahu Water Park
  - Xihaiwan Water Park
  - Tarim Dolan Hu Park
  - Qianniaohu Park
  - Shuanghu Water Park
  - Bayan Mountain Resort
  - Shihezi Taoyuan Park
  - Tarim Xianglonghu Park
  - Burultokay Xihai Water Park, Fuhai

== National Grassland Parks of China ==
- Ratified by: State Forestry and Grassland Administration
- Number of NGPs (unit): 39 (as at September 17, 2020)
- Area of NGPs (10,000 ha): 14.7
- Heilongjiang
  - 854 Nongchang National Grassland Park, General Bureau of State Farms of Heilongjiang Province (alt. 854 Farm)
- Inner Mongolia
  - Cilechuan National Grassland Park
  - Temeji National Grassland Park
  - Talinhua National Grassland Park
  - Erenhot National Grassland Park
  - Bayan Kulun National Grassland Park
  - Modon Muchang National Grassland Park (Muchang: Ranch)
  - Ganggin Xil National Grassland Park
  - Dong Ujimqin National Grassland Park
  - Helan Caoyuan National Grassland Park
  - Salqin National Grassland Park
  - Bor Hua National Grassland Park
  - Burhant National Grassland Park
  - Ulgai National Grassland Park
  - Tubtai National Grassland Park
- Hebei
  - Huangtuwan National Grassland Park
  - Qagan Nur National Grassland Park
- Shanxi
  - Huapo National Grassland Park
  - Qinshui Shifan Muchang National Grassland Park (Shifan Muchang: Demonstration Ranch)
  - Wanbaoshan National Grassland Park
- Hunan
  - Nantan National Grassland Park
  - Yanzishan National Grassland Park
- Sichuan
  - Gemu National Grassland Park
  - Zangba National Grassland Park
  - Waqên National Grassland Park
- Yunnan
  - Xiangbaichang National Grassland Park
  - Fenglongshan National Grassland Park
- Tibet
  - Nagzê National Grassland Park
  - Chigu National Grassland Park
  - Kaimar National Grassland Park
- Gansu
  - Waiwaincang National Grassland Park
  - Meiren National Grassland Park, Hezuo
- Qinghai
  - Sujiwan National Grassland Park
  - Monqi Amho National Grassland Park, Henan Mongol Autonomous County (alt. Amuhu)
  - Cuorigeng National Grassland Park, Zêkog
  - Hongjungou National Grassland Park
- Ningxia
  - Xihuashan National Grassland Park
  - Xiangshansi National Grassland Park
- Xinjiang Production and Construction Corps
  - Tianmu Caoyuan National Grassland Park

== National Desert (Rocky Desert) Parks of China ==
- Ratified by: State Forestry and Grassland Administration
- Number of NDPs (incl. NRDPs, unit): 128 (as at May 26, 2022)
- Total Number of DPs (incl. RDPs, unit): 120 (as of 2024)
- Area of DPs (10,000 ha): 41.60 (incl. RDPs, as of 2024)
- Hebei
  - Weichang Ar Bulag National Desert Park
  - Fengning Xiaobazi National Desert Park
  - Guyuan Jiuliancheng National Desert Park
- Shanxi
  - Youyu Huangshawa National Desert Park
  - Datong Xiping National Desert Park
  - Huairen Jinshatan National Desert Park
  - Shuocheng Majialiang National Desert Park
  - Zuoyun Guanjiabu National Desert Park
  - Tianzhen Biancheng National Desert Park
  - Zuoyun Que'ershan National Desert Park
  - Datong Shawo National Desert Park
  - Tianzhen Mixinguan National Desert Park
  - Datong Nanjiao Shilihe National Desert Park
  - Xinrong Wuqi National Desert Park
  - Pianguan Linhu National Desert Park
- Inner Mongolia
  - Hobq Qixinghu National Desert Park
  - Dengkou Xaxin Tohoi National Desert Park
  - Uxin Sulige National Desert Park
  - Wuhai Jinshawan National Desert Park
  - Ongniud Boronhi National Desert Park
  - Naiman Bugat National Desert Park
  - Hure Yinshawan National Desert Park
  - U Bulag National Desert Park, Urad Rear Banner
  - Gogastai National Desert Park, Zhenglan Banner
  - Dashatou National Desert Park, Otog Front Banner
  - Habuqigai National Desert Park, West Ujimqin Banner
  - Linhe Ulan Tug National Desert Park
  - Onggon Mangh National Desert Park, Uxin Banner
  - Jiukeshu National Desert Park, Alxa Right Banner
  - Shahaihu National Desert Park, Hanggin Rear Banner
- Liaoning
  - Zhangwu Daqinggou National Desert Park
  - Kangping Jinshatan National Desert Park
  - Zhangwu Sihecheng National Desert Park
- Hubei
  - Chongyang Yushan National Rocky Desert Park
- Hunan
  - Anhua Yuntaishan National Rocky Desert Park
  - Leiyang Wugongxian National Rocky Desert Park
  - Xinning National Rocky Desert Park
  - Shimen Changti'ai National Rocky Desert Park
  - Linli Kemushan National Rocky Desert Park
  - Zhangjiajie Hongshilin National Rocky Desert Park
  - Yizhang Chishi National Rocky Desert Park
  - Xupu Leifengshan National Rocky Desert Park
  - Lianyuan Fukou National Rocky Desert Park
  - Taoyuan Laozuyan National Rocky Desert Park
  - Shaoyang Jigongyan National Rocky Desert Park
  - Guiyang Sizhoushan National Rocky Desert Park
  - Dong'an Duxiufeng National Rocky Desert Park
  - Xintian Daguanbao National Rocky Desert Park
  - Hecheng Huangyan National Rocky Desert Park
- Guangdong
  - Liancheng Wanshanchaowang National Rocky Desert Park
  - Ruyuan Xijing Gudao National Rocky Desert Park
- Guangxi
  - Binyang Baxianyan National Rocky Desert Park
  - Huanjiang National Rocky Desert Park
- Sichuan
  - Xingwen Fengyan National Rocky Desert Park
- Yunnan
  - Luliang Caise Shalin National Desert Park
  - Yanshan Weimo National Rocky Desert Park
  - Xichou National Rocky Desert Park
  - Jianshui Tianzhuta National Rocky Desert Park
  - Yiliang National Rocky Desert Park
  - Luxi Baishiyan National Rocky Desert Park
  - Mile Yunfengshan National Rocky Desert Park
  - Qiubei Shede National Rocky Desert Park
- Shaanxi
  - Dali National Desert Park
  - Dingbian Maliantan National Desert Park
- Gansu
  - Aksay National Desert Park
  - Dunhuang Yangguan National Desert Park
  - Linze Xiaoquanzi National Desert Park
  - Liangzhou Toudunying National Desert Park
  - Jinchang National Desert Park
  - Minqin Shajingzi National Desert Park
  - Gaotai Luotuoyi National Desert Park
  - Jinta Lanhewan National Desert Park
  - Yumen Qingshan National Desert Park
  - Minqin Huang'antan National Desert Park
  - Liangzhou Jiuduntan National Desert Park
  - Suzhou Tianluocheng National Desert Park
- Qinghai
  - Guinan Huangshatou National Desert Park
  - Ulan Jinzihai National Desert Park
  - Dulan Tebh National Desert Park
  - Mangnai Qianfoya National Desert Park
  - Haiyan Ketu National Desert Park
  - Qumarlêb Tongtianhe National Desert Park
  - Ulan Quanshuiwan National Desert Park
  - Zêkog Hor National Desert Park
  - Golmud Tuolahai National Desert Park
  - Lenghu Yardang National Desert Park
  - Maqên Youyun National Desert Park
  - Guinan Lucang National Desert Park
- Ningxia
  - Shapotou National Desert Park
  - Lingwu Baijitan National Desert Park
  - Yanchi Shabianzi National Desert Park
  - Pingluo Miaomiaohu National Desert Park
- Xinjiang
  - Fukang Wutonggou National Desert Park
  - Jimsar National Desert Park
  - Qitai Petrified Wood National Desert Park
  - Mori Mingshashan National Desert Park
  - Yuli National Desert Park
  - Qiemo National Desert Park
  - Xayar National Desert Park
  - Shanshan National Desert Park
  - Yiwu Euphrates Poplar Forest National Desert Park
  - Lop Yurung Wan National Desert Park
  - Bohu Akbelkum National Desert Park
  - Jinghe Muttar National Desert Park
  - Hoboksar Janggar National Desert Park
  - Turpan Ayding Hu National Desert Park
  - Kuqa Qiuci National Desert Park
  - Yopurga Dawakol National Desert Park
  - Makit National Desert Park
  - Shache Karasu National Desert Park
  - Burqin Saruzun National Desert Park
  - Manas Tupaoying National Desert Park
  - Changji Beishawo National Desert Park
  - Hutubi Maqiaozi National Desert Park
  - Yengisar Sahan National Desert Park
  - Luntai Iminqek National Desert Park
  - Usu Ganjiahu National Desert Park
  - Shawan Tiemenkan National Desert Park
  - Yecheng Qaqkum National Desert Park
- Xinjiang Production and Construction Corps
  - Tuolingmengpo National Desert Park
  - Aral Shuihuyang National Desert Park
  - Uluk National Desert Park
  - Zimuhe National Desert Park
  - Zuihuyang National Desert Park
  - Aral Kungang National Desert Park
  - Kokdala National Desert Park
  - Fengshengbu National Desert Park
  - Jinsitan National Desert Park, XPCC Seventh Division

Note 1: The above-mentioned "desert" generally refers to "sandy desert", unless otherwise noted.

Note 2: The above-mentioned "rocky desert" generally refers to "karst rocky desert", unless otherwise noted.

== National Closed Sandified Land Protected Areas of China ==
- Ratified by: State Forestry and Grassland Administration
- Number of NCSLPAs: 122 (as at January 23, 2024)
- Inner Mongolia
  - Qagan National Closed Sandified Land Protected Area, Xin Barag Left Banner
  - Olji Moron National Closed Sandified Land Protected Area, Jarud Banner
  - Weiliansu National Closed Sandified Land Protected Area, Naiman Banner
  - Songshushan National Closed Sandified Land Protected Area, Ongniud Banner
  - Wantaixing National Closed Sandified Land Protected Area, General Afforestation Station of Ordos City
  - Xar Tal National Closed Sandified Land Protected Area, Otog Banner
  - Dugui Tal National Closed Sandified Land Protected Area, Hanggin Banner
  - Shuangmiao National Closed Sandified Land Protected Area, Hanggin Banner
  - Hogq National Closed Sandified Land Protected Area, Urad Rear Banner
  - Ereh Hasah National Closed Sandified Land Protected Area, Alxa Left Banner
  - Mandal National Closed Sandified Land Protected Area, Alxa Right Banner
  - Ongt Gol National Closed Sandified Land Protected Area, Ejin Banner
  - Altan Qog National Closed Sandified Land Protected Area, Alxa Right Banner
  - Yabrai National Closed Sandified Land Protected Area, Alxa Right Banner
  - Jagt National Closed Sandified Land Protected Area, Alxa Left Banner
  - Gurnai National Closed Sandified Land Protected Area, Ejin Banner
  - Ih Us National Closed Sandified Land Protected Area, Hanggin Banner
  - Xine Us National Closed Sandified Land Protected Area, Urad Rear Banner
  - Sanggin Dalai National Closed Sandified Land Protected Area, Zhenglan Banner
  - Gobi National Closed Sandified Land Protected Area, Urad Rear Banner
- Tibet
  - Nianjiusang National Closed Sandified Land Protected Area, Gar County
  - Lingtangqêmo National Closed Sandified Land Protected Area, Dinggyê County
  - Gaqoi National Closed Sandified Land Protected Area, Zhongba County
  - Nankor National Closed Sandified Land Protected Area, Sa'gya County
  - Dagdong National Closed Sandified Land Protected Area, Coqên County
  - Zhuglung National Closed Sandified Land Protected Area, Coqên County
  - Shang Zoco National Closed Sandified Land Protected Area, Gar County
  - Domar National Closed Sandified Land Protected Area, Gêrzê County
- Shaanxi
  - National Closed Sandified Land Protected Area along Great Wall, Jingbian County
  - Heigeda Huanghusha National Closed Sandified Land Protected Area, Hengshan District
  - Wushilisha National Closed Sandified Land Protected Area, Yuyang District
  - National Closed Sandified Land Protected Area in Windblown Sandy Lakeshore Shrublands of Northern Dingbian County
- Gansu
  - Mingshashan National Closed Sandified Land Protected Area, Dunhuang City
  - National Closed Sandified Land Protected Area on Western Edge of Badain Jaran Desert, Jinta County
  - National Closed Sandified Land Protected Area in Arid Desert of Northern Linze County
  - Dongtan National Closed Sandified Land Protected Area, Minle County
  - Suosuojing National Closed Sandified Land Protected Area, Minqin County
  - National Closed Sandified Land Protected Area in Northern Portion of Qinghe Oasis, Yongchang County
  - Hongliuquan National Closed Sandified Land Protected Area, Yumen City
  - National Closed Sandified Land Protected Area on Western Edge of Tengger Desert, Jinchuan District
  - Jiacaotan National Closed Sandified Land Protected Area, Liangzhou District
  - Mahuangtang National Closed Sandified Land Protected Area, Gulang County
  - Cuiliugou National Closed Sandified Land Protected Area, Jingtai County
  - Tianshui Town National Closed Sandified Land Protected Area, Huanxian
  - Dong Gobi National Closed Sandified Land Protected Area, Dunhuang City
  - Nganggarbo National Closed Sandified Land Protected Area, Maqu County
  - Dongle Nantan National Closed Sandified Land Protected Area, Shandan County
  - Mazongshan Town National Closed Sandified Land Protected Area, Subei County
  - Shiliangzi National Closed Sandified Land Protected Area, Jinta County
  - Xishawo National Closed Sandified Land Protected Area, Gaotai County
  - Kumtag National Closed Sandified Land Protected Area, Aksay County
  - Shangbalangjing National Closed Sandified Land Protected Area, Minqin County
  - Hongdunzi National Closed Sandified Land Protected Area, Jinta County
  - Dengmayinghu National Closed Sandified Land Protected Area, Liangzhou District
  - Yibaisi Gobi National Closed Sandified Land Protected Area, Dunhuang City
  - Samdan Say National Closed Sandified Land Protected Area, Aksay County
  - Orta Bastaw National Closed Sandified Land Protected Area, Aksay County
- Qinghai
  - Xarag National Closed Sandified Land Protected Area, Dulan County
  - Bulanggir National Closed Sandified Land Protected Area, Ulan County
  - Mangnai Administrative Committee National Closed Sandified Land Protected Area, Haixi Prefecture
  - Mogê Tan National Closed Sandified Land Protected Area, Guinan County
  - Da Qaidam Administrative Committee National Closed Sandified Land Protected Area
  - Urt Moron National Closed Sandified Land Protected Area, Golmud City
  - Haiyan County National Closed Sandified Land Protected Area
  - Tal Tan National Closed Sandified Land Protected Area, Gonghe County
  - Lucang National Closed Sandified Land Protected Area, Guinan County
  - Lenghu Administrative Committee National Closed Sandified Land Protected Area, Haixi Prefecture
  - Qamalung National Closed Sandified Land Protected Area, Maqên County
  - Zaohuo National Closed Sandified Land Protected Area, Ulan County
- Ningxia
  - Baijitan Sandbreak Forest Farm National Closed Sandified Land Protected Area, Lingwu City
  - Suanzaoliang National Closed Sandified Land Protected Area, Hongsibu District
  - Magaozhuang Township National Closed Sandified Land Protected Area, Tongxin County
  - Changliushui National Closed Sandified Land Protected Area, Shapotou District, Zhongwei City
  - Yanchi Mechanized Forest Farm National Closed Sandified Land Protected Area
- Xinjiang
  - Gezkum National Closed Sandified Land Protected Area, Xayar County
  - National Closed Sandified Land Protected Area in Southern Nanhu Township of Hami City
  - National Closed Sandified Land Protected Area in Northwestern Kawak Township of Moyu County
  - Hedong National Closed Sandified Land Protected Area, Qiemo County
  - Liushe National Closed Sandified Land Protected Area, Manas County
  - Kumtag National Closed Sandified Land Protected Area, Shanshan County
  - Route S239 National Closed Sandified Land Protected Area, Jimsar County (S239: a provincial-level road)
  - Hotan Qiao National Closed Sandified Land Protected Area, Awat County
  - National Closed Sandified Land Protected Area on Northern Edge of Oasis in Yopurga County
  - Kumtobay National Closed Sandified Land Protected Area, Jeminay County
  - Qira Township National Closed Sandified Land Protected Area, Qira County
  - National Closed Sandified Land Protected Area at Luobuzhuang Section of National Highway 218, Ruoqiang County
  - Akbelkum National Closed Sandified Land Protected Area, Bohu County
  - Mingshashan National Closed Sandified Land Protected Area, Mori County
  - National Closed Sandified Land Protected Area in Northern Hanggiya Town of Lop County
  - Buguram National Closed Sandified Land Protected Area, Yengisar County
  - Sarkum National Closed Sandified Land Protected Area, Burqin County
  - Xiahe Linchang National Closed Sandified Land Protected Area, Bachu County
  - Sankouquan National Closed Sandified Land Protected Area, Fuhai County
  - Cainan National Closed Sandified Land Protected Area, Fukang City
  - Koktet National Closed Sandified Land Protected Area, Jiashi County
  - Kumbulag National Closed Sandified Land Protected Area, Hoxud County
  - Beishawo National Closed Sandified Land Protected Area, Hutubi County
  - Tinsk National Closed Sandified Land Protected Area, Jeminay County
  - National Closed Sandified Land Protected Area in South of Tarim Region, Kuqa County
  - Caohu Township National Closed Sandified Land Protected Area, Luntai County
  - Karangur Tograk National Closed Sandified Land Protected Area, Makit County
  - Niya Township National Closed Sandified Land Protected Area, Minfeng County
  - Kokterak Township National Closed Sandified Land Protected Area, Pishan County
  - Xidi National Closed Sandified Land Protected Area, Qitai County
  - Donghu National Closed Sandified Land Protected Area, Shanshan County
  - Aqqik National Closed Sandified Land Protected Area, Yuli County
  - Aqyar Town National Closed Sandified Land Protected Area, Wushi County
  - Daryaboyi Township National Closed Sandified Land Protected Area, Yutian County
  - Karasu Township National Closed Sandified Land Protected Area, Shache County
  - Janggilieski National Closed Sandified Land Protected Area, Yecheng County
  - Qowok National Closed Sandified Land Protected Area, Aksu City
  - Qikbulung National Closed Sandified Land Protected Area, Kalpin County
  - Qongerkum Shamo National Closed Sandified Land Protected Area, Korla City
  - Toudao Shamo National Closed Sandified Land Protected Area, Mori County
  - Buguli Shamo National Closed Sandified Land Protected Area in Qarak Town of Shache County
  - National Closed Sandified Land Protected on West Bank of Niya River, Minfeng County
  - Waxxari National Closed Sandified Land Protected Area, Ruoqiang County
  - Hongbaishan National Closed Sandified Land Protected Area, Lop County
  - National Closed Sandified Land Protected Area in Northeastern Karasay Town of Moyu County
  - Yengibag Township National Closed Sandified Land Protected Area, Yutian County
  - Shamo Huyang National Closed Sandified Land Protected Area, Lop County
  - Karayulhun National Closed Sandified Land Protected Area, Makit County

== National Special Marine Protected Areas (Marine Parks) of China ==
- Ratified by: State Forestry and Grassland Administration
- Number of NSMPA/MPs (unit): 45 (as at July 23, 2026)
- Area of NSMPAs (incl. MPs) (10,000 km^{2}): 0.4349 (as of 2012)
- Total Number of SMPAs (unit): 79 (incl. MPs, as of 2024)
- Area of SMPAs (incl. MPs) (10,000 ha): 93.30
- Tianjin
  - Binhai National Marine Park
- Hebei
  - Beidaihe National Marine Park
- Liaoning
  - Jinzhou Dabijiashan National Special Marine Protected Area (National Marine Park) +1
  - Liaohekou Honghaitan National Marine Park
  - Suizhong Jieshi National Marine Park
  - Juehuadao National Marine Park
  - Dalian Changshan Qundao National Marine Park
  - Dalian Jinshitan National Marine Park
  - Tuanshan National Marine Park
  - Dalian Xianyuwan National Marine Park
  - Dalian Xinghaiwan National Marine Park
  - Linghai Dalinghekou National Marine Park
- Shanghai
  - Jinshan National Marine Park
- Jiangsu
  - Lianyungang Haizhouwan Bay Ecosystem and Natural Relic National Special Marine Protected Area +2
  - Haimen Liyashan National Marine Park
  - Lianyungang Haizhouwan National Marine Park +2
  - Xiaoyangkou National Marine Park
- Zhejiang
  - Ximendao National Marine Park, Yueqing (redesignated, orig. Yueqing Ximendao NSMPA)
  - ~~Shengsi Ma'an Liedao National Special Marine Protected Area~~
  - ~~Putuo Zhongjieshan Liedao National Special Marine Protected Area~~
  - ~~Yushan Liedao National Special Marine Protected Area (National Marine Park)~~
  - Dongtou National Marine Park
  - Ma'an Liedao National Marine Park, Shengsi
  - Yuhuan National Marine Park
  - Xiangshan National Marine Park (renamed, orig. Ningbo Xiangshan Hua'aodao NMP)
  - Zhongjieshan Liedao National Marine Park, Putuo (renamed, orig. Putuo NMP)
- Fujian
  - ~~Xiamen National Marine Park~~
  - ~~Fuyao Liedao National Marine Park~~
  - Changle National Marine Park
  - ~~Meizhoudao National Marine Park~~
  - Chengzhoudao National Marine Park
  - Chongwu National Marine Park
  - ~~Haitanwan National Marine Park, Pingtan Comprehensive Experimental Zone~~
- Shandong
  - Changyi Littoral National Marine Park (redesignated, orig. Changyi NSMPA)
  - ~~Dongying Huanghekou Ecosystem National Special Marine Protected Area~~
  - ~~Dongying Lijin Demersal Fishes Ecosystem National Special Marine Protected Area~~
  - ~~Dongying Hekou Shallow-water Shellfishes Ecosystem National Special Marine Protected Area~~
  - ~~Dongying Laizhouwan Solenoidea Ecosystem National Special Marine Protected Area~~
  - Guangrao Sandworms National Marine Park, Dongying (redesignated, orig. Dongying Guangrao Sandworms Ecosystem NSMPA)
  - ~~Wendeng Ocean Ecosystem National Special Marine Protected Area~~
  - ~~Longkou Huangshuihekou Ocean Ecosystem National Special Marine Protected Area~~
  - ~~Weihai Liugongdao Ocean Ecosystem National Special Marine Protected Area~~
  - ~~Yantai Zhifudao Island Group National Special Marine Protected Area~~
  - ~~Rushan Tadaowan Ocean Ecosystem National Special Marine Protected Area~~
  - Muping Sandy Coast National Marine Park (redesignated, orig. Yantai Muping Sandy Coast NSMPA)
  - ~~Laiyang Wulonghekou Littoral Wetland National Special Marine Protected Area~~
  - Wanmi Haitan National Marine Park (redesignated, orig. Haiyang Wanmi Haitan Ocean Resources NSMPA)
  - Xiaoshidao National Marine Park (redesignated, orig. Weihai Xiaoshidao NSMPA)
  - ~~Laizhou Qiantan Ocean Ecosystem National Special Marine Protected Area (alt. Laizhou Shoal)~~
  - ~~Penglai Dengzhou Qiantan National Special Marine Protected Area (alt. Dengzhou Shoal)~~
  - ~~Weihai Liugongdao National Marine Park~~
  - Rizhao National Marine Park
  - Darushan National Marine Park
  - ~~Changdao National Marine Park~~
  - ~~Qingdao Xihai'an National Marine Park~~
  - ~~Yantaishan National Marine Park~~
  - ~~Penglai National Marine Park~~
  - Zhaoyuan Sandy Gold Coast National Marine Park
  - ~~Weihai Haixitou National Marine Park~~
  - ~~Yantai Laishan National Marine Park~~
  - Jiaozhouwan National Marine Park, Qingdao
- Guangdong
  - Hailingdao National Marine Park
  - Techengdao National Mainre Park
  - Leizhou Wushi National Marine Park
  - Nan'ao Qing'aowan National Marine Park
  - Yangxi Yueliangwan National Marine Park
  - Honghaiwan Zhelang Bandao National Marine Park
- Guangxi
  - Qinzhou Maoweihai National Marine Park
  - Weizhoudao Coral Reef National Marine Park
- Hainan
  - Wanning Laoyehai National Marine Park
  - Changjiang Qiziwan National Marine Park

+1/+2: one identical institution under two different names.

== National Aquatic Germplasm Resources Conservation Areas of China ==
- Ratified by: Ministry of Agriculture
- Number of NAGRCAs (unit): 535 (as at October 31, 2017)
- Total Number of AGRCAs (unit): TBV
- Hebei
  - Fuping Chinese Softshell Turtle National Aquatic Germplasm Resources Conservation Area [Pelodiscus sinensis]
  - Hengshuihu National Aquatic Germplasm Resources Conservation Area
  - Baiyangdian National Aquatic Germplasm Resources Conservation Area
  - Qinhuangdao Waters National Aquatic Germplasm Resources Conservation Area
  - Changli Waters National Aquatic Germplasm Resources Conservation Area
  - Nandaihe Waters National Aquatic Germplasm Resources Conservation Area
  - Nandagang National Aquatic Germplasm Resources Conservation Area
  - Luanhe Endemic Fishes National Aquatic Germplasm Resources Conservation Area
  - Liuhe Endemic Fishes National Aquatic Germplasm Resources Conservation Area
  - Baipohu Endemic Fishes National Aquatic Germplasm Resources Conservation Area
  - Shazhanghe Redfin Culter and Oriental River Prawn National Aquatic Germplasm Resources Conservation Area [Chanodichthys erythropterus]-[Macrobrachium nipponense]
  - Yongnianwa Asian Swamp Eel and Pond Loach National Aquatic Germplasm Resources Conservation Area [Monopterus albus]-[Misgurnus anguillicaudatus]
  - Shanhaiguan Waters National Aquatic Germplasm Resources Conservation Area
  - Yongdinghe Chinese Softshell Turtle, Oriental River Prawn and Yellow Catfish National Aquatic Germplasm Resources Conservation Area [Tachysurus fulvidraco]
  - Guyuan Shandianhe Drainage System Bashang High-back Wild Goldfish National Aquatic Germplasm Resources Conservation Area [Carassius auratus var. Bashang high-back type]
  - Qianxi Lixianghu Reddish Dark Brown Carp and Yellow Catfish National Aquatic Germplasm Resources Conservation Area [Cyprinus rubrofuscus]
  - Caofeidian Chinese Mitten Crab National Aquatic Germplasm Resources Conservation Area [Eriocheir sinensis]
  - Xiangyundao Waters National Aquatic Germplasm Resources Conservation Area
  - Shijiazhuang Zhongshanhu Oriental River Prawn and Yellow Catfish National Aquatic Germplasm Resources Conservation Area
- Shanxi
  - Shengtianhu Chinese Catfish and Huanghe Carp National Aquatic Germplasm Resources Conservation Area [Silurus asotus]-[Cyprinus rubrofuscus var. Huanghe]
  - Qinhe Endemic Fishes National Aquatic Germplasm Resources Conservation Area
  - National Aquatic Germplasm Resources Conservation Area at Yumenkou to Sanmenxia Section of Middle Yellow River (trans-provincial NAGRCA, shared with Henan and Shaanxi)
- Inner Mongolia
  - Lanzhou Catfish National Aquatic Germplasm Resources Conservation Area at Ordos Section of Yellow River [Silurus lanzhouensis]
  - Taimen National Aquatic Germplasm Resources Conservation Area at Genhe Section of Ergun River [Hucho taimen]
  - Hulunhu Redfin Culter National Aquatic Germplasm Resources Conservation Area
  - Dal Nur Amur Ide National Aquatic Germplasm Resources Conservation Area [Leuciscus waleckii]
  - Hureet Hu National Aquatic Germplasm Resources Conservation Area
  - Ganhe Taimen and Lenok National Aquatic Germplasm Resources Conservation Area [Brachymystax lenok]
  - Holin He Yellow Catfish National Aquatic Germplasm Resources Conservation Area
  - Taimen and Lenok National Aquatic Germplasm Resources Conservation Area at Zalantun City Section of Chaor River
  - Dayanhe National Aquatic Germplasm Resources Conservation Area
- Liaoning
  - Shuangtaizihekou Jellyfish Haizhe and Chinese Mitten Crab National Aquatic Germplasm Resources Conservation Area [Rhopilema esculentum]
  - Sanshandao Waters National Aquatic Germplasm Resources Conservation Area
  - Haiyangdao National Aquatic Germplasm Resources Conservation Area
  - Dalian Yuandao Waters National Aquatic Germplasm Resources Conservation Area
  - Dalian Zhangzidao Waters National Aquatic Germplasm Resources Conservation Area
  - Dalian Yuyanjiao Waters National Aquatic Germplasm Resources Conservation Area
  - Hunheyuan Lenok National Aquatic Germplasm Resources Conservation Area
- Jilin
  - Mijianghe Chum Salmon National Aquatic Germplasm Resources Conservation Area [Oncorhynchus keta]
  - Korean Taimen National Aquatic Germplasm Resources Conservation Area at Ji'an Section of Yalu River [Hucho ishikawae]
  - Ussuri Catfish National Aquatic Germplasm Resources Conservation Area at Da'an Section of River Nenjiang [Pelteobagrus ussuriensis]
  - Leopard Mandarin Fish and Yalu Grayling National Aquatic Germplasm Resources Conservation Area at Yunfeng Section of Yalu River [Siniperca scherzeri]-[Thymallus yaluensis]
  - Blackspotted Pike National Aquatic Germplasm Resources Conservation Area at Upper Mudan River [Esox reicherti]
  - Hunchunhe Chum Salmon National Aquatic Germplasm Resources Conservation Area
  - Songhuajiang Toudaojiang Endemic Fishes National Aquatic Germplasm Resources Conservation Area
  - Songhuajiang Ningjiang Section National Aquatic Germplasm Resources Conservation Area
  - Erlonghu National Aquatic Germplasm Resources Conservation Area
  - Xibeichahe Endemic Fishes National Aquatic Germplasm Resources Conservation Area
  - Nenjiang Zhenlai Section National Aquatic Germplasm Resources Conservation Area
  - Xiaoshihe Coldwater Fishes National Aquatic Germplasm Resources Conservation Area
  - Yuelianghu National Aquatic Germplasm Resources Conservation Area
  - Dahuangnihe Barbel Steed National Aquatic Germplasm Resources Conservation Area [Hemibarbus labeo]
  - Hanihe Korean Lamprey National Aquatic Germplasm Resources Conservation Area [Eudontomyzon morii]
  - Chinese Hooksnout Carp National Aquatic Germplasm Resources Conservation Area at Linjiang Section of Yalu River [Opsariichthys bidens]
  - Songyuan Songhuajiang Yellowfin National Aquatic Germplasm Resources Conservation Area [Xenocypris macrolepis]
  - Zhu'erduohe Amur Minnow National Aquatic Germplasm Resources Conservation Area [Rhynchocypris lagowskii]
  - Helong Hongqihe Masu Salmon Landlocked Type National Aquatic Germplasm Resources Conservation Area [Oncorhynchus masou]
  - Tonghua Hanihe National Aquatic Germplasm Resources Conservation Area
  - Nenjiang Qian Gorlos Section National Aquatic Germplasm Resources Conservation Area
  - Huinan Huifahe Amur Ide National Aquatic Germplasm Resources Conservation Area
  - Baijianghe Endemic Fishes National Aquatic Germplasm Resources Conservation Area
  - Northern Lampreys National Aquatic Germplasm Resources Conservation Area at Jilin Section of Songhua River [Petromyzontid lampreys genus Lethenteron, incl. Arctic and Far Eastern brook lampreys]
  - Qian Gorlos Qagan Hu Mongolian Redfin National Aquatic Germplasm Resources Conservation Area [Chanodichthys mongolicus]
  - Qian Gorlos Xinmiaopao Endemic Fishes National Aquatic Germplasm Resources Conservation Area
  - Songhuahu Endemic Fishes National Aquatic Germplasm Resources Conservation Area
  - Jilin Jinjiang Endemic Fishes National Aquatic Germplasm Resources Conservation Area
- Heilongjiang
  - Amur Whitefish National Aquatic Germplasm Resources Conservation Area at Luobei Section of Heilong River [Coregonus ussuriensis]
  - Panguhe Lenok and Burbot National Aquatic Germplasm Resources Conservation Area [Lota lota]
  - Blackspotted Pike and Amur Ide National Aquatic Germplasm Resources Conservation Area at Jiayin Section of Heilong River
  - Songhuajiang Ussuri Catfish and Smallscale Yellowfin National Aquatic Germplasm Resources Conservation Area [Plagiognathops microlepis]
  - Heilongjiang Lijiadao Topmouth Culter National Aquatic Germplasm Resources Conservation Area [Culter alburnus]
  - Heilongjiang Humawan Endemic Fishes National Aquatic Germplasm Resources Conservation Area
  - Hailanghe Endemic Fishes National Aquatic Germplasm Resources Conservation Area
  - Songhuajiang Zhaodong Section National Aquatic Germplasm Resources Conservation Area
  - Heilongjiang Tongjiang Section National Aquatic Germplasm Resources Conservation Area
  - Songhuajiang Mulan Section National Aquatic Germplasm Resources Conservation Area
  - Heilongjiang Xunke Section National Aquatic Germplasm Resources Conservation Area
  - Amur Sturgeon and Kaluga National Aquatic Germplasm Resources Conservation Area at Fuyuan Section of Heilong River [Acipenser schrenckii]-[Huso dauricus]
  - Pacific Redfin and Pacific Salmons National Aquatic Germplasm Resources Conservation Area at Dongning Section of Suifen River [Tribolodon brandtii, incl. 3 migrating groups with gold, silver and black variations in skin color]-[Salmonid fishes genus Oncorhynchus, incl. chum, masu and humpback salmons]
  - Mangniuhe National Aquatic Germplasm Resources Conservation Area
  - Nenjiang Woduhe Amur Grayling and Taimen National Aquatic Germplasm Resources Conservation Area [Thymallus grubii]
  - Spotted Steed National Aquatic Germplasm Resources Conservation Area at Zhaoyuan Section of Songhua River [Hemibarbus maculatus]
  - Mandarin Fish and Yellowfin National Aquatic Germplasm Resources Conservation Area at Shuangcheng Section of Songhua River [Siniperca chuatsi]
  - Xingkaihu Topmouth Culter National Aquatic Germplasm Resources Conservation Area
  - Taimen and White Amur Bream National Aquatic Germplasm Resources Conservation Area at Sipai Section of Wusuli River [Parabramis pekinensis]
  - Huangnihe Fangzheng Prussian Carp National Aquatic Germplasm Resources Conservation Area [Carassius gibelio var. Fangzheng]
  - Fabielahe Mandarin Fish National Aquatic Germplasm Resources Conservation Area
  - Kaluga National Aquatic Germplasm Resources Conservation Area at Tongjiang Section of Heilong River
  - Ougenhe Blackspotted Pike National Aquatic Germplasm Resources Conservation Area
  - Nenjiang Songhuajiang Sanchahekou Silver Carp and Topmouth Culter National Aquatic Germplasm Resources Conservation Area [Hypophthalmichthys molitrix]
  - Wusulijiang (Hulin Section) Endemic Fishes National Aquatic Germplasm Resources Conservation Area
- Shanghai
  - Changjiang Japanese Grenadier Anchovy National Aquatic Germplasm Resources Conservation Area [Coilia nasus] (trans-provincial NAGRCA, shared with Jiangsu and Anhui)
- Jiangsu
  - Haizhouwan Fleshy Prawn National Aquatic Germplasm Resources Conservation Area [Penaeus chinensis]
  - Taihu Icefishes, Topmouth Culter and Siberian Prawn National Aquatic Germplasm Resources Conservation Area, Lake Taihu [Salangids genera Neosalanx & Protosalanx]-[Exopalaemon modestus]
  - Hongzehu Oriental River Prawn and Asian Clam National Aquatic Germplasm Resources Conservation Area [Corbicula fluminea]
  - Yangchenghu Chinese Mitten Crab National Aquatic Germplasm Resources Conservation Area
  - Chinese Mitten Crab and Mandarin Fish National Aquatic Germplasm Resources Conservation Area at Jingjiang Section of Yangtze River
  - Jiangjiasha Zhugensha Korean Mud Snail and Asiatic Hard Clam National Aquatic Germplasm Resources Conservation Area [Bullacta exarata]-[Meretrix meretrix]
  - Changjiang Dashengguan Chinese Longsnout Catfish and Bronze Gudgeon National Aquatic Germplasm Resources Conservation Area [Leiocassis longirostris]-[Coreius heterodon]
  - Guchenghu Chinese Mitten Crab National Aquatic Germplasm Resources Conservation Area
  - Gaoyouhu Clearhead Icefish and Lake Anchovy National Aquatic Germplasm Resources Conservation Area [Protosalanx hyalocranius]-[Coilia nasus taihuensis]
  - "Four Major Domestic Carps" National Aquatic Germplasm Resources Conservation Area at Yangzhou Section of Yangtze River [Cyprinids genera Mylopharyngodon, Ctenopharyngodon & Hypophthalmichthys, incl. black, grass, silver and bighead carps]
  - Baimahu Pond Loach and Dark Sleeper National Aquatic Germplasm Resources Conservation Area [Odontobutis obscura]
  - Luomahu National Aquatic Germplasm Resources Conservation Area
  - Gehu National Aquatic Germplasm Resources Conservation Area
  - Changdanghu National Aquatic Germplasm Resources Conservation Area
  - Shaobohu National Aquatic Germplasm Resources Conservation Area
  - Changyanghu National Aquatic Germplasm Resources Conservation Area
  - Sheyanghu National Aquatic Germplasm Resources Conservation Area
  - Baoyinghu National Aquatic Germplasm Resources Conservation Area
  - Japanese Grenadier Anchovy National Aquatic Germplasm Resources Conservation Area at Rugao Section of Yangtze River
  - Taihu Oriental River Prawn and Chinese Mitten Crab National Aquatic Germplasm Resources Conservation Area
  - Rudong Grand Razor Shell and Antique Mactra National Aquatic Germplasm Resources Conservation Area [Solen grandis]-[Mactra antiquata]
  - Hongzehu Icefishes National Aquatic Germplasm Resources Conservation Area
  - Luomahu Oriental River Prawn National Aquatic Germplasm Resources Conservation Area
  - Taihu Lake Anchovy and Asian Clam National Aquatic Germplasm Resources Conservation Area
  - Dianshanhu Asian Clam and Tommouth Culter National Aquatic Germplasm Resources Conservation Area
  - Changjiang Japanese Grenadier Anchovy National Aquatic Germplasm Resources Conservation Area (trans-provincial NAGRCA, shared with Shanghai and Anhui)
  - Gehu Cultrinae Fishes National Aquatic Germplasm Resources Conservation Area [Cyprinids genera Culter & Chanodichthys, incl. topmouth culter, Mongolian redfin and "humpback"]
  - Gaoyouhu Asian Clam and Siberian Prawn National Aquatic Germplasm Resources Conservation Area
  - Obscure Pufferfish and Japanese Grenadier Anchovy National Aquatic Germplasm Resources Conservation Area at Yangzhong Section of Yangtze River [Takifugu obscurus]
  - Yixing Tuanjiu Dongjiu Topmouth Culter National Aquatic Germplasm Resources Conservation Area
  - Hongzehu Palaemonid Prawns National Aquatic Germplasm Resources Conservation Area [subfamily Palaemoninae, incl. Siberian and Oriental river prawns]
  - Hongzehu Mandarin Fish National Aquatic Germplasm Resources Conservation Area
  - Jinshahu Yellow Catfish National Aquatic Germplasm Resources Conservation Area
  - Gaoyouhu Oriental River Prawn National Aquatic Germplasm Resources Conservation Area
  - Hongzehu Yellow Catfish National Aquatic Germplasm Resources Conservation Area
- Zhejiang
  - Yueqingwan Granular Ark National Aquatic Germplasm Resources Conservation Area [Tegillarca granosa]
  - Qiandaohu National Aquatic Germplasm Resources Conservation Area
  - Dong-Xitiaoxi National Aquatic Germplasm Resources Conservation Area
  - Xiangshangang Japanese Spanish Mackerel National Aquatic Germplasm Resources Conservation Area [Scomberomorus niphonius]
  - Qingyuan Chinese Giant Salamander National Aquatic Germplasm Resources Conservation Area [Andrias davidianus]
- Anhui
  - Bohu Siberian Prawn and Oriental River Prawn National Aquatic Germplasm Resources Conservation Area
  - Chinese Longsnout Catfish, Chinese Large-mouth Catfish and Mandarin Fish National Aquatic Germplasm Resources Conservation Area at Anqing Section of Yangtze River [Silurus meridionalis]
  - Wuchanghu Chinese Softshell Turtle and Asian Swamp Eel National Aquatic Germplasm Resources Conservation Area
  - Poganghu Yellow Catfish National Aquatic Germplasm Resources Conservation Area
  - Jiaoganghu Foxnut National Aquatic Germplasm Resources Conservation Area [Euryale ferox]
  - Huishuihe Endemic Fishes National Aquatic Germplasm Resources Conservation Area
  - "Four Major Domestic Carps" National Aquatic Germplasm Resources Conservation Area at Anqing Section of Yangtze River
  - Changjiang Endemic Fishes National Aquatic Germplasm Resources Conservation Area
  - Chengxihu National Aquatic Germplasm Resources Conservation Area
  - Qiupuhe Endemic Fishes National Aquatic Germplasm Resources Conservation Area
  - Chengdonghu National Aquatic Germplasm Resources Conservation Area
  - Xizihu National Aquatic Germplasm Resources Conservation Area
  - Wanfohu National Aquatic Germplasm Resources Conservation Area
  - Chinese Longsnout Catfish National Aquatic Germplasm Resources Conservation Area at Huainan Section of River Huaihe
  - Qinglonghu Spinibarbus caldwelli National Aquatic Germplasm Resources Conservation Area
  - Longwohu Smallscale Yellowfin National Aquatic Germplasm Resources Conservation Area
  - Chihe Topmouth Culter National Aquatic Germplasm Resources Conservation Area
  - Changjianghe Freshwater Minnow and Chinese Hooksnout Carp National Aquatic Germplasm Resources Conservation Area [Zacco platypus]
  - Huaihong Xinhe Neosalanx taihuensis National Aquatic Germplasm Resources Conservation Area
  - Changjiang Japanese Grenadier Anchovy National Aquatic Germplasm Resources Conservation Area (trans-provincial NAGRCA, shared with Shanghai and Jiangsu)
  - Manshuihe Mongolian Redfin National Aquatic Germplasm Resources Conservation Area
  - Dengyuanhe Endemic Fishes National Aquatic Germplasm Resources Conservation Area
  - Huangguhe Cyprinids genera Acrossocheilus and Onychostoma National Aquatic Germplasm Resources Conservation Area (incl. Acrossocheilus wenchowensis, Acrossocheilus hemispinus, Acrossocheilus parallens & Onychostoma elongatum)
  - Huaihe Jingtuxia Reddish Dark Brown Carp and Chinese Longsnout Catfish National Aquatic Germplasm Resources Conservation Area
  - Huangpenhe Gobies and Oriental River Prawn National Aquatic Germplasm Resources Conservation Area [Gobiid fishes genus Rhinogobius, incl. Rhinogobius giurinus & Rhinogobius cliffordpopei]
  - Huatinghu Bleeker’s Yellow Tail National Aquatic Germplasm Resources Conservation Area [Xenocypris davidi]
  - Solenia oleivora National Aquatic Germplasm Resources Conservation Area at Fuyang Section of River Huaihe
  - Rhynchocypris oxycephalus, Acrossocheilus fasciatus et Zacco platypus National Aquatic Germplasm Resources Conservation Area at Shexian Section of Xin'an River (Rhynchocypris oxycephalus: Chinese minnow; Zacco platypus: freshwater minnow)
  - Huanghe Carp National Aquatic Germplasm Resources Conservation Area at Dangshan Section of Abandoned Yellow River
- Fujian
  - Guanjingyang Large Yellow Croaker National Aquatic Germplasm Resources Conservation Area [Pseudosciaena crocea]
  - Xixi Chinese Softshell Turtle National Aquatic Germplasm Resources Conservation Area
  - Zhanggang Antique Mactra National Aquatic Germplasm Resources Conservation Area
  - Tingjiang Zig-zag Eel National Aquatic Germplasm Resources Conservation Area [Mastacembelus armatus]
  - Jiuquxi Spinibarbus caldwelli National Aquatic Germplasm Resources Conservation Area
  - Huyangxi Spinibarbus caldwelli National Aquatic Germplasm Resources Conservation Area
  - Luokouxi Bleeker’s Yellow Tail National Aquatic Germplasm Resources Conservation Area
  - Jianxi Smallscale Yellowfin National Aquatic Germplasm Resources Conservation Area
  - Nanpuxi Acrossocheilus hemispinus National Aquatic Germplasm Resources Conservation Area
  - Songxihe Acrossocheilus paradoxus National Aquatic Germplasm Resources Conservation Area
  - Maxi Acrossocheilus hemispinus National Aquatic Germplasm Resources Conservation Area, Shunchang
- Jiangxi
  - Poyanghu Mandarin Fish and Topmouth Culter National Aquatic Germplasm Resources Conservation Area
  - Taojiang Spinibarbus caldwelli National Aquatic Germplasm Resources Conservation Area
  - Lushanxihai Yellowcheek National Aquatic Germplasm Resources Conservation Area [Elopichthys bambusa]
  - Taipohu Pengze Wild-type Goldfish National Aquatic Germplasm Resources Conservation Area [Carassius auratus var. Pengze]
  - Luxihe Largefin Longbarbel Catfish National Aquatic Germplasm Resources Conservation Area [Hemibagrus macropterus]
  - Fuhe Mandarin Fish National Aquatic Germplasm Resources Conservation Area
  - Pingshuihe Endemic Fishes National Aquatic Germplasm Resources Conservation Area
  - Wannianhe Endemic Fishes National Aquatic Germplasm Resources Conservation Area
  - Huishui Endemic Fishes National Aquatic Germplasm Resources Conservation Area
  - Xinjiang Endemic Fishes National Aquatic Germplasm Resources Conservation Area
  - Dingjianghe Endemic Fishes National Aquatic Germplasm Resources Conservation Area
  - Endemic Fishes National Aquatic Germplasm Resources Conservation Area at Upper River Yuanhe
  - "Four Major Domestic Carps" National Aquatic Germplasm Resources Conservation Area at Xiajiang Section of River Ganjiang
  - Qinjiang Smallscale Yellowfin National Aquatic Germplasm Resources Conservation Area
  - Shangyoujiang Endemic Fishes National Aquatic Germplasm Resources Conservation Area
  - Dongjiangyuan Big-headed Turtle National Aquatic Germplasm Resources Conservation Area [Platysternon megacephalum]
  - Changjiang Spinibarbus caldwelli National Aquatic Germplasm Resources Conservation Area
  - Ganjiangyuan Blotched Snakehead National Aquatic Germplasm Resources Conservation Area [Channa maculata]
  - Xiushuiyuan Spinibarbus caldwelli National Aquatic Germplasm Resources Conservation Area
  - Boyanghe Topmouth Culter and Yellow Catfish National Aquatic Germplasm Resources Conservation Area, De'an
  - Changjiang Balijiang Section Chinese Longsnout Catfish and Chinese Catfish National Aquatic Germplasm Resources Conservation Area
  - "Four Major Domestic Carps" National Aquatic Germplasm Resources Conservation Area at Jiangxi Section of Yangtze River
  - Luxi Spiny Paa Frog National Aquatic Germplasm Resources Conservation Area [Quasipaa spinosa]
  - Triangle Sail Mussel National Aquatic Germplasm Resources Conservation Area at Lower River Xiuhe [Hyriopsis cumingii]
  - Spiny Paa Frog National Aquatic Germplasm Resources Conservation Area, Yihuang
- Shandong
  - Kongtong Liedao Japanese Spiky Sea Cucumber National Aquatic Germplasm Resources Conservation Area [Apostichopus japonicus]
  - Nansihu Northern Snakehead and Oriental River Prawn National Aquatic Germplasm Resources Conservation Area [Channa argus]
  - Changdao Japanese Disc Abalone and Dalian Purple Urchin National Aquatic Germplasm Resources Conservation Area [Haliotis discus hannai]-[Mesocentrotus nudus]
  - Haizhouwan Grand Razor Shell National Aquatic Germplasm Resources Conservation Area
  - Laizhouwan Penis Fish and Suminoe Oyster National Aquatic Germplasm Resources Conservation Area [Urechis unicinctus]- [Crassostrea rivularis]
  - Jinghaiwan Roughskin Sculpin National Aquatic Germplasm Resources Conservation Area [Trachidermus fasciatus]
  - Taishan Red-scaled Fish National Aquatic Germplasm Resources Conservation Area, Mount Taishan [Onychostoma macrolepis]
  - Majiahe Asiatic Hard Clam National Aquatic Germplasm Resources Conservation Area
  - Penglai Bastard Halibut and Marbled Flounder National Aquatic Germplasm Resources Conservation Area [Paralichthys olivaceus]-[Pseudopleuronectes yokohamae]
  - Huanghekou Half-smooth Tongue Sole National Aquatic Germplasm Resources Conservation Area [Cynoglossus semilaevis]
  - Lingshandao Japanese Disc Abalone and Japanese Spiky Sea Cucumber National Aquatic Germplasm Resources Conservation Area
  - Jingziwan National Aquatic Germplasm Resources Conservation Area
  - Rushanwan National Aquatic Germplasm Resources Conservation Area
  - Qiansandao Waters National Aquatic Germplasm Resources Conservation Area (Note that there is a dispute between the provinces of Shandong and Jiangsu over ownership of Qiansandao Islands)
  - Xiaoshidao Japanese Spiky Sea Cucumber National Aquatic Germplasm Resources Conservation Area
  - Sanggouwan National Aquatic Germplasm Resources Conservation Area
  - Rongchengwan National Aquatic Germplasm Resources Conservation Area
  - Tao'erhekou Waters National Aquatic Germplasm Resources Conservation Area
  - Qianliyan Waters National Aquatic Germplasm Resources Conservation Area
  - Antique Mactra National Aquatic Germplasm Resources Conservation Area at Rizhao Waters
  - Dongpinghu National Aquatic Germplasm Resources Conservation Area
  - Gould's Razor Shell National Aquatic Germplasm Resources Conservation Area at Guangrao Waters [Solen strictus]
  - Huanghekou Asiatic Hard Clam National Aquatic Germplasm Resources Conservation Area
  - Changdao Korean Rockfish National Aquatic Germplasm Resources Conservation Area [Sebastes schlegelii]
  - Wulonghe Carp National Aquatic Germplasm Resources Conservation Area, Wulong River [Cyprinus rubrofuscus var. Wulonghe]
  - Rongcheng Chudao Algae National Aquatic Germplasm Resources Conservation Area
  - Rizhao Fleshy Prawn National Aquatic Germplasm Resources Conservation Area
  - Wudi Northern Mauxia Shrimp National Aquatic Germplasm Resources Conservation Area [Acetes chinensis]
  - Yuehu Whiparm Octopus National Aquatic Germplasm Resources Conservation Area [Octopus variabilis]
  - Sishui Peach Blossom Jellyfish National Aquatic Germplasm Resources Conservation Area [Craspedacusta sowerbii]
  - National Aquatic Germplasm Resources Conservation Area along Shandong-Henan Border Sector of Yellow River (trans-provincial NAGRCA, shared with Henan)
  - Huangqian Shuiku Bleeker’s Yellow Tail National Aquatic Germplasm Resources Conservation Area
  - Deyuehu Spotted Steed and Topmouth Culter National Aquatic Germplasm Resources Conservation Area
  - Majiahe Topmouth Culter and Large-scale Loach National Aquatic Germplasm Resources Conservation [Paramisgurnus dabryanus]
  - Yunmenghu Clearhead Icefish National Aquatic Germplasm Resources Conservation Area
  - Yihe Carp and Oriental River Prawn National Aquatic Germplasm Resources Conservation Area, River Yihe [Cyprinus rubrofuscus var. Yihe]
  - Yellow Catfish National Aquatic Germplasm Resources Conservation Area at Tai'erzhuang Section of Beijing-Hangzhou Canal
  - Qingshuihe Asian Clam National Aquatic Germplasm Resources Conservation Area
  - Zihe Chinese Catfish National Aquatic Germplasm Resources Conservation Area
  - Wenchanghu Endemic Fishes National Aquatic Germplasm Resources Conservation Area
  - Qingyanghe Black Amur Bream National Aquatic Germplasm Resources Conservation Area [Megalobrama terminalis]
  - Madahu Oriental River Prawn and Chinese Mitten Crab National Aquatic Germplasm Resources Conservation Area
  - Guangminghu Redfin Culter National Aquatic Germplasm Resources Conservation Area
  - Qingyunhu Neosalanx oligodontis National Aquatic Germplasm Resources Conservation Area
  - Yinan Wenhe Chinese Hooksnout Carp National Aquatic Germplasm Resources Conservation Area
- Henan
  - Huanghe Carp National Aquatic Germplasm Resources Conservation Area at Zhengzhou Section of Yellow River
  - Qihe Wild-type Goldfish National Aquatic Germplasm Resources Conservation Area, River Qihe [Carassius auratus var. Qihe]
  - Guangshan Oriental River Prawn National Aquatic Germplasm Resources Conservation Area
  - Suyahu Cockscomb Pearl Mussel National Aquatic Germplasm Resources Conservation Area [Cristaria plicata]
  - Nanwanhu National Aquatic Germplasm Resources Conservation Area
  - Danjiang Endemic Fishes National Aquatic Germplasm Resources Conservation Area
  - Shahe Endemic Fishes National Aquatic Germplasm Resources Conservation Area
  - Pohe Endemic Fishes National Aquatic Germplasm Resources Conservation Area
  - Yihe Endemic Fishes National Aquatic Germplasm Resources Conservation Area
  - Luohe Huanghe Carp National Aquatic Germplasm Resources Conservation Area
  - Laoyahe Spotted Steed National Aquatic Germplasm Resources Conservation Area
  - Yahekou Shuiku Mongolian Redfin National Aquatic Germplasm Resources Conservation Area
  - National Aquatic Germplasm Resources Conservation Area at Yumenkou to Sanmenxia Section of Middle Yellow River (trans-provincial NAGRCA, shared with Shanxi and Shaanxi)
  - Xiaohuanghe Chinese Softshell Turtle National Aquatic Germplasm Resources Conservation Area
  - Ruhe Yellow Catfish National Aquatic Germplasm Resources Conservation Area, River Ruhe [Tachysurus fulvidraco var. Ruhe]
  - Qihe Wild-type Goldfish National Aquatic Germplasm Resources Conservation Area at Hebi Section of River Qihe
  - National Aquatic Germplasm Resources Conservation Area along Shandong-Henan Border Sector of Yellow River (trans-provincial NAGRCA, shared with Shandong)
  - Banqiaohu National Aquatic Germplasm Resources Conservation Area
  - Luohe Lihe Oriental River Prawn National Aquatic Germplasm Resources Conservation Area
  - Ussuri Catfish and Amur Ide National Aquatic Germplasm Resources Conservation Area at Luoning Section of River Luohe
- Hubei
  - Liangzihu Wuchang Bream National Aquatic Germplasm Resources Conservation Area [Megalobrama amblycephala]
  - Xilianghu Mandarin Fish and Yellow Catfish National Aquatic Germplasm Resources Conservation Area
  - Yunihu Wuchang Bream National Aquatic Germplasm Resources Conservation Area
  - Changhu Cultrinae Fishes National Aquatic Germplasm Resources Conservation Area [Cyprinids genera Culter & Chanodichthys, incl. Culter alburnus, Chanodichthys mongolicus, Chanodichthys dabryi, Culter oxycephaloides & Chanodichthys erythropterus]
  - "Four Major Domestic Carps" National Aquatic Germplasm Resources Conservation Area at Huangshi Section of Yangtze River
  - Chinese Longsnout Catfish and Darkbarbel Catfish National Aquatic Germplasm Resources Conservation Area at Shayang Section of River Hanjiang [Pseudobagrus vachellii]
  - Elopichthys bambusa, Ochetobius elongatus et Luciobrama macrocephalus National Aquatic Germplasm Resources Conservation Area at Zhongxiang Section of River Hanjiang (Elopichthys bambusa: yellowcheek; Luciobrama macrocephalus: long Spiky-head Carp)
  - Taibaihu National Aquatic Germplasm Resources Conservation Area
  - "Four Major Domestic Carps" National Aquatic Germplasm Resources Conservation Area at Jianli Section of Yangtze River
  - Danjiang Cultrinae Fishes National Aquatic Germplasm Resources Conservation Area [Cyprinids genera Culter & Chanodichthys, incl. Culter alburnus, Chanodichthys mongolicus, Culter oxycephaloides & Chanodichthys erythropterus]
  - Pohe Endemic Fishes National Aquatic Germplasm Resources Conservation Area
  - Shangjinhu National Aquatic Germplasm Resources Conservation Area
  - Huamahu National Aquatic Germplasm Resources Conservation Area
  - Honghu National Aquatic Germplasm Resources Conservation Area
  - Hanjiang Hanchuan Section National Aquatic Germplasm Resources Conservation Area
  - Juzhanghe Endemic Fishes National Aquatic Germplasm Resources Conservation Area
  - Yuquanhe Endemic Fishes National Aquatic Germplasm Resources Conservation Area
  - Bao'anhu Mandarin Fish National Aquatic Germplasm Resources Conservation Area
  - Luhu Mandarin Fish and Cultrinae Fishes National Aquatic Germplasm Resources Conservation Area
  - Wuhu Asian Swamp Eel National Aquatic Germplasm Resources Conservation Area
  - Chidonghu White Amur Bream National Aquatic Germplasm Resources Conservation Area
  - Qingjiang Onychostoma simum National Aquatic Germplasm Resources Conservation Area
  - Huiting Shuiku Chinese Softshell Turtle National Aquatic Germplasm Resources Conservation Area
  - Wangmuhu Wuchang Bream and Yangtse Grenadier Anchovy National Aquatic Germplasm Resources Conservation Area [Coilia brachygnathus]
  - Wuhu Yellow Catfish National Aquatic Germplasm Resources Conservation Area
  - Guanyinhu Mandarin Fish National Aquatic Germplasm Resources Conservation Area
  - Hanbeihe Darkbarbel Catfish National Aquatic Germplasm Resources Conservation Area
  - Yangchaihu Dark Sleeper and Lesser Spiny Eel National Aquatic Germplasm Resources Conservation Area [Macrognathus aculeatus]
  - "Four Major Domestic Carps" National Aquatic Germplasm Resources Conservation Area at Qianjiang Section of River Hanjiang
  - Yunshui Topmouth Culter National Aquatic Germplasm Resources Conservation Area
  - Chonghu Yellow Catfish National Aquatic Germplasm Resources Conservation Area
  - Miaohu Topmouth Culter National Aquatic Germplasm Resources Conservation Area
  - Yezhuhu Cultrinae Fishes National Aquatic Germplasm Resources Conservation Area [Cyprinids genera Culter & Chanodichthys, incl. topmouth culter, Mongolian redfin and "humpback"]
  - Cehu Yellow Catfish and Northern Snakehead National Aquatic Germplasm Resources Conservation Area
  - Nanhaihu Yangtse Grenadier Anchovy National Aquatic Germplasm Resources Conservation Area
  - Niulanghu Mandarin Fish National Aquatic Germplasm Resources Conservation Area
  - Zhupohu Spotted Steed National Aquatic Germplasm Resources Conservation Area
  - Fuhe Smallscale Yellowfin National Aquatic Germplasm Resources Conservation Area
  - Qianhe Chinese Catfish National Aquatic Germplasm Resources Conservation Area
  - Weishui Mandarin Fish National Aquatic Germplasm Resources Conservation Area
  - Wangjiahe Cultrinae Fishes National Aquatic Germplasm Resources Conservation Area [Cyprinids genera Culter & Chanodichthys, incl. Culter alburnus, Chanodichthys mongolicus & Culter oxycephaloides]
  - Duhe Mandarin Fish National Aquatic Germplasm Resources Conservation Area
  - Jinhuahu Spotted Steed National Aquatic Germplasm Resources Conservation Area
  - Wangjiadahu Lamprotula fibrosa National Aquatic Germplasm Resources Conservation Area
  - Hongqihu Asian Swamp Eel and Yellow Catfish National Aquatic Germplasm Resources Conservation Area
  - Longtanhu Mongolian Redfin National Aquatic Germplasm Resources Conservation Area
  - Smallscale Yellowfin National Aquatic Germplasm Resources Conservation Area at Xianjuemiao on Tributary of River Piaoshui
  - Longsaihu Smallscale Yellowfin and Topmouth Culter National Aquatic Germplasm Resources Conservation Area
  - Shatanhe Northern Snakehead National Aquatic Germplasm Resources Conservation Area
  - Wangtianhu Topmouth Culter National Aquatic Germplasm Resources Conservation Area
  - Tiantanghu Cultrinae Fishes National Aquatic Germplasm Resources Conservation Area [Cyprinids genera Culter & Chanodichthys, incl. topmouth culter, "humpback" and Mongolian redfin]
  - Shengshuihu Yellow Catfish National Aquatic Germplasm Resources Conservation Area
  - Pipahu Smallscale Yellowfin National Aquatic Germplasm Resources Conservation Area
  - Fushuihu Cultrinae Fishes National Aquatic Germplasm Resources Conservation Area
  - Jinshahu White Amur Bream National Aquatic Germplasm Resources Conservation Area
  - Yanzhihu Yellow Catfish National Aquatic Germplasm Resources Conservation Area
  - Dongganghu Asian Swamp Eel National Aquatic Germplasm Resources Conservation Area
  - Nanhu Yellow Catfish and Northern Snakehead National Aquatic Germplasm Resources Conservation Area
  - White Amur Bream National Aquatic Germplasm Resources at Xiangyang Section of River Hanjiang
  - Neosalanx pseudotaihuensis National Aquatic Germplasm Resources at Xujiahe Waters on Tributary of River Fuhe
  - Topmouth Culter National Aquatic Germplasm Resources Conservation Area at Yunyang Section of River Hanjiang
  - Spinibarbus sinensis National Aquatic Germplasm Resources Conservation Area at Yidu Section of River Qingjiang
  - Yaohe Pond Loach National Aquatic Germplasm Resources Conservation Area
  - Dafushuihe Leopard Mandarin Fish National Aquatic Germplasm Resources Conservation Area
  - Onychostoma macrolepis National Aquatic Germplasm Resources Conservation Area at Longbeiwan Section of River Duhe
  - Topmouth Culter National Aquatic Germplasm Resources Conservation Area at Heiwuwan Section of Zhashui River
- Hunan
  - Dongdongtinghu Reddish Dark Brown Carp, Wild-type Goldfish and Yellow Catfish National Aquatic Germplasm Resources Conservation Area [carassius auratus]
  - Nandongtinghu Icefishes and Triangle Sail Mussel National Aquatic Germplasm Resources Conservation Area
  - Xiangjiang Wild Carp National Aquatic Germplasm Resources Conservation Area at Xiangtan Section of River Xiangjiang [Cyprinus rubrofuscus var. Xiangjiang]
  - Nandongtinghu Chinese Large-mouth Catfish, Oriental River Prawn and Chinese Softshell Turtle National Aquatic Germplasm Resources Conservation Area
  - Nandongtinghu Reeves’ Turtle and Chinese Softshell Turtle National Aquatic Germplasm Resources Conservation Area [Mauremys reevesii]
  - Yuanshui Endemic Fishes National Aquatic Germplasm Resources Conservation Area
  - Lishuiyuan Endemic Fishes National Aquatic Germplasm Resources Conservation Area
  - "Four Major Domestic Carps" National Aquatic Germplasm Resources Conservation Area at Hengyang Section of River Xiangjiang
  - Liuyanghe Endemic Fishes National Aquatic Germplasm Resources Conservation Area
  - Dongtinghukou Bronze Gudgeon and Yangtse Grenadier Anchovy National Aquatic Germplasm Resources Conservation Area
  - Xiangjiang Spinibarbus caldwelli, Acrossocheilus paradoxus et Sinibrama wui National Aquatic Germplasm Resources Conservation Area
  - Cultrinae Fishes and Yellow Catfish National Aquatic Germplasm Resources Conservation Area at Chenxi Section of River Yuanshui
  - Cockscomb Pearl Mussel National Aquatic Germplasm Resources Conservation Area at Dingcheng Section of River Yuanshui
  - Dongdongtinghu Chinese Mystery Snail National Aquatic Germplasm Resources Conservation Area [Cipangopaludina chinensis]
  - Sinipercinae and Cultrinae Fishes National Aquatic Germplasm Resources Conservation Area at Xinhua Section of River Zishui (major protected targets: big-eye mandarin fish and topmouth culter; other protected species: mandarin fish, Mongolian redfin, etc.)
  - Xenocyprinae Fishes National Aquatic Germplasm Resources Conservation Area at Zhuzhou Section of River Xiangjiang
  - Leishui Blotched Snakehead National Aquatic Germplasm Resources Conservation Area
  - Spinibarbus sinensis National Aquatic Germplasm Resources Conservation Area at Chaling Section of River Mishui
  - Yellow Catfish National Aquatic Germplasm Resources Conservation Area at Yiyang Section of River Zishui
  - Topmouth Culter National Aquatic Germplasm Resources Conservation Area at Xiangxi Section of River Youshui
  - Bleeker’s Yellow Tail National Aquatic Germplasm Resources Conservation Area at Shimen Section of River Lishui
  - Anxiang Yangjiahe Section Yangtse Grenadier Anchovy National Aquatic Germplasm Resources Conservation Area
  - Yongshun Sichenghe Rhinogobio typus et Siniperca knerii National Aquatic Germplasm Resources Conservation Area (Siniperca knerii: big-eye mandarin fish)
  - Yellow Catfish and Bleeker’s Yellow Tail National Aquatic Germplasm Resources Conservation Area at Taoyuan Section of River Yuanshui
  - Oriental River Prawn and Chinese Softshell Turtle National Aquatic Germplasm Resources Conservation Area at Wuling Section of River Yuanshui
  - Zig-zag Eel and Chinese Barb National Aquatic Germplasm Resources Conservation Area at Zixing Section of River Zheshui [Barbodes semifasciolatus]
  - Longshan Xichehe Hemibagrus macropterus et Rhinogobio typus National Aquatic Germplasm Resources Conservation Area (Hemibagrus macropterus: largefin longbarbel catfish)
  - Zijiang Youxihe Culter oxycephaloides et Chanodichthys mongolicus National Aquatic Germplasm Resources Conservation Area (Chanodichthys mongolicus: Mongolian redfin)
  - Chinese Large-mouth Catfish National Aquatic Germplasm Resources Conservation Area at Xiongjiahe Section of Lishui Floodway
  - White Amur Bream and Largefin Longbarbel Catfish National Aquatic Germplasm Resources Conservation Area at Taohuayuan Section of River Yuanshui
  - Dark Sleeper and Bleeker’s Yellow Tail National Aquatic Germplasm Resources Conservation Area at Xinshao Section of River Zishui
  - Topmouth Culter National Aquatic Germplasm Resources Conservation Area at Anxiang Section of Hudu River
  - Yellow Catfish and Bleeker’s Yellow Tail National Aquatic Germplasm Resources Conservation Area at Linwu Section of Wushui River of River Beijiang
  - Chinese Catfish National Aquatic Germplasm Resources Conservation Area at Estuary Section of Miluo River
  - Spinibarbus caldwelli et Culter oxycephaloides National Aquatic Germplasm Resources Conservation Area at Shuangpai Section of River Xiaoshui of River Xiangjiang
  - Leopard Mandarin Fish and Yellow Catfish National Aquatic Germplasm Resources Conservation Area at Pingjiang Section of Miluo River
- Guangdong
  - Xijiang Black Amur Bream National Aquatic Germplasm Resources Conservation Area
  - Shang-Xiachuandao Chinese Spiny Lobster National Aquatic Germplasm Resources Conservation Area [Panulirus stimpsoni]
  - Shikuhe Spotted Longbarbel Catfish National Aquatic Germplasm Resources Conservation Area [Hemibagrus guttatus]
  - Liuxihe Spinibarbus caldwelli National Aquatic Germplasm Resources Conservation Area
  - Zengjiang Spinibarbus caldwelli et Mastacembelus armatus National Aquatic Germplasm Resources Conservation Area (Mastacembelus armatus: zig-zag eel)
  - Hailingwan Suminoe Oyster National Aquatic Germplasm Resources Conservation Area
  - Xijiang Barbel Chub and Hainan Culter National Aquatic Germplasm Resources Conservation Area [Squaliobarbus curriculus]-[Culter recurviceps]
  - Xijiang Zhaoqing Section National Aquatic Germplasm Resources Conservation Area
  - Beijiang Yingde Section National Aquatic Germplasm Resources Conservation Area
  - Rongjiang Endemic Fishes National Aquatic Germplasm Resources Conservation Area
  - Lingjiang Endemic Fishes National Aquatic Germplasm Resources Conservation Area
  - Xinfengjiang National Aquatic Germplasm Resources Conservation Area
  - Jianjiangkou Soletellina acuta National Aquatic Germplasm Resources Conservation Area
  - Tanjiang Black Amur Bream National Aquatic Germplasm Resources Conservation Area
  - Shanwei Jieshiwan Flathead Grey Mullet and Redtail Prawn National Aquatic Germplasm Resources Conservation Area [Mugil cephalus]-[Penaeus penicillatus]
  - Youshuhe Blotched Snakehead National Aquatic Germplasm Resources Conservation Area
  - Lijiang Zig-zag Eel and Yellow Catfish National Aquatic Germplasm Resources Conservation Area
- Guangxi
  - Lijiang Spinibarbus caldwelli et Sinocyclocheilus guilinensis National Aquatic Germplasm Resources Conservation Area (Sinocyclocheilus guilinensis: Guilin golden-line barbel)
  - Xijiang Wuzhou Section National Aquatic Germplasm Resources Conservation Area
  - Liujiang Cranoglanis bouderius, Bangana decora et Hemitrygon akajei National Aquatic Germplasm Resources Conservation Area (Cranoglanis bouderius: helmet catfish; Hemitrygon akajei: whip stingray)
- Hainan
  - Xisha Dongdao Waters National Aquatic Germplasm Resources Conservation Area
  - Wanquanhe National Aquatic Germplasm Resources Conservation Area
- Chongqing
  - "Four Major Domestic Carps" National Aquatic Germplasm Resources Conservation Area at Chongqing Section of Yangtze River
  - Jialingjiang Hechuan Section National Aquatic Germplasm Resources Conservation Area
- Sichuan
  - Endemic Fishes National Aquatic Germplasm Resources Conservation Area at Upper Yellow River (trans-provincial NAGRCA, shared with Gansu and Qinghai)
  - Datongjianghe Rock Carp National Aquatic Germplasm Resources Conservation Area [Procypris rabaudi]
  - Qijiang Yellow Catfish National Aquatic Germplasm Resources Conservation Area
  - Qujiang Tachysurus fulvidraco et Onychostoma simum National Aquatic Germplasm Resources Conservation Area (Tachysurus fulvidraco: yellow catfish)
  - Jialingjiang Procypris rabaudi et Spinibarbus sinensis National Aquatic Germplasm Resources Conservation Area (Procypris rabaudi: rock carp)
  - Zijiang National Aquatic Germplasm Resources Conservation Area
  - Yilonghe Endemic Fishes National Aquatic Germplasm Resources Conservation Area
  - Mengxihe Endemic Fishes National Aquatic Germplasm Resources Conservation Area
  - Tonghe Endemic Fishes National Aquatic Germplasm Resources Conservation Area
  - Jialingjiang Nanbu Section National Aquatic Germplasm Resources Conservation Area
  - Gouxihe Endemic Fishes National Aquatic Germplasm Resources Conservation Area
  - Longtanhe Endemic Fishes National Aquatic Germplasm Resources Conservation Area
  - Bahe Endemic Fishes National Aquatic Germplasm Resources Conservation Area
  - Houhe Endemic Fishes National Aquatic Germplasm Resources Conservation Area
  - Elongate Loach and Largefin Longbarbel Catfish National Aquatic Germplasm Resources Conservation Area at Yuechi Section of River Qujiang [Leptobotia elongata]
  - Enyanghe Chinese Softshell Turtle National Aquatic Germplasm Resources Conservation Area
  - Lijiahe Wild-type Goldfish National Aquatic Germplasm Resources Conservation Area
  - Endemic Fishes National Aquatic Germplasm Resources Conservation Area at Jiange Section of River Xihe
  - Nanhe Onychostoma simum et Pseudobagrus vachellii National Aquatic Germplasm Resources Conservation Area (Pseudobagrus vachellii: darkbarbel catfish)
  - Jiaojiahe Schizothorax davidi National Aquatic Germplasm Resources Conservation Area
  - Qingjianghe Endemic Fishes National Aquatic Germplasm Resources Conservation Area
  - Minjiang Chinese Longsnout Catfish National Aquatic Germplasm Resources Conservation Area
  - Yingtouhe Endemic Fishes National Aquatic Germplasm Resources Conservation Area
  - Laixihe Topmouth Culter and Mongolian Redfin National Aquatic Germplasm Resources Conservation Area
  - Bahe Procypris rabaudi et Bangana rendahli National Aquatic Germplasm Resources Conservation Area (Procypris rabaudi: rock carp)
  - Xiaoshuihe National Aquatic Germplasm Resources Conservation Area
  - Dahonghehe National Aquatic Germplasm Resources Conservation Area
  - Kaijiang National Aquatic Germplasm Resources Conservation Area
  - Zhenxihe Chinese Large-mouth Catfish and Topmouth Culter National Aquatic Germplasm Resources Conservation Area
  - Chajiang National Aquatic Germplasm Resources Conservation Area
  - Pingtonghe Cyprinid Fishes Genus Schizothorax National Aquatic Germplasm Resources Conservation Area (incl. Schizothorax davidi & Schizothorax sinensis)
- Guizhou
  - Jinjianghe Endemic Fishes National Aquatic Germplasm Resources Conservation Area
  - Mengjiang Bawanghe Endemic Fishes National Aquatic Germplasm Resources Conservation Area
  - Taipinghe Minxiaohe Endemic Fishes National Aquatic Germplasm Resources Conservation Area
  - Wuyanghe Endemic Fishes National Aquatic Germplasm Resources Conservation Area
  - Matihe Chinese Catfish and Yellow Catfish National Aquatic Germplasm Resources Conservation Area
  - Longchuanhe Pseudogyrinocheilus prochilus et Siniperca chuatsi National Aquatic Germplasm Resources Conservation Area (Siniperca chuatsi: mandarin fish)
  - Liuchonghe Cyprinid Fishes Genus Schizothorax National Aquatic Germplasm Resources Conservation Area (incl. Schizothorax grahami & Schizothorax kozlovi)
  - Youshanhe Endemic Fishes National Aquatic Germplasm Resources Conservation Area
  - Longdijiang Yellow Catfish and Chinese Large-mouth Catfish National Aquatic Germplasm Resources Conservation Area
  - Yinjianghe Pseudogyrinocheilus prochilus National Aquatic Germplasm Resources Conservation Area
  - Wujiang Yellow Catfish National Aquatic Germplasm Resources Conservation Area
  - Furongjiang Chinese Large-mouth Catfish National Aquatic Germplasm Resources Conservation Area
  - Wengmihe Endemic Fishes National Aquatic Germplasm Resources Conservation Area
  - Endemic Fishes National Aquatic Germplasm Resources Conservation Area at Jiupan Section of Beipan River
  - Songtaohe Endemic Fishes National Aquatic Germplasm Resources Conservation Area
  - Xieqiaohe Endemic Fishes National Aquatic Germplasm Resources Conservation Area
  - Majinghe Spinibarbus sinensis National Aquatic Germplasm Resources Conservation Area
  - Qingshuijiang Endemic Fishes National Aquatic Germplasm Resources Conservation Area
  - Ximihe Acrossocheilus yunnanensis National Aquatic Germplasm Resources Conservation Area
  - Furongjiang Endemic Fishes National Aquatic Germplasm Resources Conservation Area
  - Zuomahe Endemic Fishes National Aquatic Germplasm Resources Conservation Area
  - Longjianghe Spinibarbus caldwelli National Aquatic Germplasm Resources Conservation Area
  - Longjianghe Prenant's Schizothoracin National Aquatic Germplasm Resources Conservation Area [Schizothorax prenanti]
  - Darkbarbel Catfish National Aquatic Germplasm Resources Conservation Area at Huangping Section of Wuyang River
- Yunnan
  - Mijuhe Dali Schizothoracin National Aquatic Germplasm Resources Conservation Area [Zacco taliensis]
  - Nanpenghe Neolissochilus baoshanensis National Aquatic Germplasm Resources Conservation Area
  - Yuanjiang Carp National Aquatic Germplasm Resources Conservation Area, River Yuanjiang [Cyprinus rubrofuscus]
  - Binglangjiang Pseudecheneis sulcata et Pseudexostoma yunnanense National Aquatic Germplasm Resources Conservation Area (Pseudecheneis sulcata: sucker throat catfish)
  - Lancangjiang Pangasius micronemus, Clupisoma sinense et Wallago attu National Aquatic Germplasm Resources Conservation Area (Pangasius micronemus: shortbarbel pangasius; Wallago attu: wallago)
  - Dianchi National Aquatic Germplasm Resources Conservation Area
  - Fuxianhu Endemic Fishes National Aquatic Germplasm Resources Conservation Area
  - Baishuijiang Endemic Fishes National Aquatic Germplasm Resources Conservation Area
  - Endemic Fishes National Aquatic Germplasm Resources Conservation Area at Middle and Upper River Nujiang
  - Chenghaihu Endemic Fishes National Aquatic Germplasm Resources Conservation Area
  - Nanlahe Endemic Fishes National Aquatic Germplasm Resources Conservation Area
  - Gulahe Endemic Fishes National Aquatic Germplasm Resources Conservation Area
  - Puwenhe Endemic Fishes National Aquatic Germplasm Resources Conservation Area
  - Guanzhaihe Endemic Fishes National Aquatic Germplasm Resources Conservation Area
  - Nantinghe Downstream Section National Aquatic Germplasm Resources Conservation Area
- Tibet
  - Pagsumco Endemic Fishes National Aquatic Germplasm Resources Conservation Area
  - Nyang He Endemic Fishes National Aquatic Germplasm Resources Conservation Area
  - Xizang Brown Trout National Aquatic Germplasm Resources Conservation Area, Yadong [Salmo trutta fario] (note: introduced from Europe by British in the 19th century)
  - Yarlung Zangbo Jiang Cyprinid Fishes Genus Schizothorax National Aquatic Germplasm Resources Conservation Area
  - Mêtog Dêrgang He Endemic Fishes National Aquatic Germplasm Resources Conservation Area
- Shaanxi
  - Heihe Onychostoma macrolepis National Aquatic Germplasm Resources Conservation Area
  - Northern Snakehead National Aquatic Germplasm Resources Conservation Area at Qiachuan Section of Yellow River
  - Jialingjiangyuan Endemic Fishes National Aquatic Germplasm Resources Conservation Area
  - Wangchuanhe Endemic Fishes National Aquatic Germplasm Resources Conservation Area
  - Kuyuhe Endemic Fishes National Aquatic Germplasm Resources Conservation Area
  - Hanjiang Xixiang Section National Aquatic Germplasm Resources Conservation Area
  - Weihe National Aquatic Germplasm Resources Conservation Area
  - Huanghetan Chinese Softshell Turtle National Aquatic Germplasm Resources Conservation Area
  - Baohe Endemic Fishes National Aquatic Germplasm Resources Conservation Area
  - National Aquatic Germplasm Resources Conservation Area at Yumenkou to Sanmenxia Section of Middle Yellow River (trans-provincial NAGRCA, shared with Shanxi and Henan)
  - Juhe Shangyou National Aquatic Germplasm Resources Conservation Area
  - Danjiangyuan National Aquatic Germplasm Resources Conservation Area
  - Qianhe National Aquatic Germplasm Resources Conservation Area
  - Xushuihe National Aquatic Germplasm Resources Conservation Area
  - Ganyuhe Qinling Lenok National Aquatic Germplasm Resources Conservation Area [Brachymystax tsinlingensis]
  - Renhe Onychostoma macrolepis National Aquatic Germplasm Resources Conservation Area
  - Baoji Tongguanhe Qinling Lenok National Aquatic Germplasm Resources Conservation Area
  - Weihe Meixian Section National Aquatic Germplasm Resources Conservation Area
  - Xiliuhe National Aquatic Germplasm Resources Conservation Area
  - Huanghe Carp and Lanzhou Catfish National Aquatic Germplasm Resources Conservation Area at Longmen Section of Yellow River in Hancheng of Shaanxi [Cyprinus rubrofuscus var. Huanghe]
- Gansu
  - Huanghe Liujiaxia Lanzhou Catfish National Aquatic Germplasm Resources Conservation Area
  - Endemic Fishes National Aquatic Germplasm Resources Conservation Area at Upper Yellow River (trans-provincial NAGRCA, shared with Sichuan and Qinghai)
  - Baishuijiang Schizothorax davidi National Aquatic Germplasm Resources Conservation Area
  - Taohe Wide-tooth Schizothoracin National Aquatic Germplasm Resources Conservation Area [Platypharodon extremus]
  - Daxiahe Yellow River Schizothoracin National Aquatic Germplasm Resources Conservation Area [Schizopygopsis pylzovi]
  - Yongninghe Endemic Fishes National Aquatic Germplasm Resources Conservation Area
  - Bailongjiang Endemic Fishes National Aquatic Germplasm Resources Conservation Area
  - Taohe Endemic Fishes National Aquatic Germplasm Resources Conservation Area
  - Huanghe Heishanxia Section National Aquatic Germplasm Resources Conservation Area
  - Shulehe Endemic Fishes National Aquatic Germplasm Resources Conservation Area
  - Taohe Dingxi Endemic Fishes National Aquatic Germplasm Resources Conservation Area
  - Endemic Fishes National Aquatic Germplasm Resources Conservation Area at Jingtai Section of Yellow River
  - Endemic Fishes National Aquatic Germplasm Resources Conservation Area at Liangdang Section of Jialing River
  - Yemuhe Yangshahe Endemic Fishes National Aquatic Germplasm Resources Conservation Area
  - Endemic Fishes National Aquatic Germplasm Resources Conservation Area at Headwaters of River Weihe
  - Endemic Fishes National Aquatic Germplasm Resources Conservation Area at Gannan Section of River Taohe
  - Gansu Tanchang National Aquatic Germplasm Resources Conservation Area
  - Daxihe Chinese Softshell Turtle National Aquatic Germplasm Resources Conservation Area
  - Zhangjiachuan Qinling Lenok National Aquatic Germplasm Resources Conservation Area
  - Huanghe Gansu Pingchuan Section National Aquatic Germplasm Resources Conservation Area
  - Endemic Fishes National Aquatic Germplasm Resources Conservation Area at Baiyin District Section of Yellow River
  - Qinling Lenok National Aquatic Germplasm Resources Conservation Area, Huating
- Qinghai
  - Przewalski's Naked Carp National Aquatic Germplasm Resources Conservation Area, Qinghai Lake [Gymnocypris przewalskii]
  - Endemic Fishes National Aquatic Germplasm Resources Conservation Area at Upper Yellow River (trans-provincial NAGRCA, shared with Sichuan and Gansu)
  - Gyaring Hu Ngoring Hu Gymnocypris eckloni et Platypharodon extremus National Aquatic Germplasm Resources Conservation Area (Platypharodon extremus: wide-tooth schizothoracin)
  - Markog He Schizothorax davidi National Aquatic Germplasm Resources Conservation Area
  - Endemic Fishes National Aquatic Germplasm Resources Conservation Area at Jainca Section of Yellow River
  - Endemic Fishes National Aquatic Germplasm Resources Conservation Area at Guide Section of Yellow River
  - Gêqu He Endemic Fishes National Aquatic Germplasm Resources Conservation Area
  - Togtun He Endemic Fishes National Aquatic Germplasm Resources Conservation Area
  - Datonghe Endemic Fishes National Aquatic Germplasm Resources Conservation Area
  - Heihe Endemic Fishes National Aquatic Germplasm Resources Conservation Area
  - Qumar He Endemic Fishes National Aquatic Germplasm Resources Conservation Area
  - Golmud He National Aquatic Germplasm Resources Conservation Area
  - Sunmco National Aquatic Germplasm Resources Conservation Area
  - Yanzhangguaxia Endemic Fishes National Aquatic Germplasm Resources Conservation Area, Yushu Prefecture4
- Ningxia
  - Lanzhou Catfish National Aquatic Germplasm Resources Conservation Area at Zhongwei-Zhongning Section of Yellow River
  - Rhinogobio nasutus National Aquatic Germplasm Resources Conservation Area at Qingtongxia-Shizuishan Section of Yellow River
  - Xiji Zhenhu Endemic Fishes National Aquatic Germplasm Resources Conservation Area
  - Shahu Endemic Fishes National Aquatic Germplasm Resources Conservation Area
  - Huanghe Carp National Aquatic Germplasm Resources Conservation Area at Yuanzhou Section of Qingshui River
- Xinjiang
  - Kanas Hu Endemic Fishes National Aquatic Germplasm Resources Conservation Area
  - Yarkant He Endemic Fishes National Aquatic Germplasm Resources Conservation Area
  - Ebi Hu Endemic Fishes National Aquatic Germplasm Resources Conservation Area
  - Ulungur Hu Endemic Fishes National Aquatic Germplasm Resources Conservation Area
  - Küirtix He Arctic Grayling National Aquatic Germplasm Resources Conservation Area [Thymallus arcticus]
  - Bosten Hu National Aquatic Germplasm Resources Conservation Area
  - Kaiduhe Endemic Fishes National Aquatic Germplasm Resources Conservation Area
  - Kaba He National Aquatic Germplasm Resources Conservation Area
  - Endemic Fishes National Aquatic Germplasm Resources Conservation Area at Koksu Section of Ertix River
  - Künes He Endemic Fishes National Aquatic Germplasm Resources Conservation Area
  - Tekes He Endemic Fishes National Aquatic Germplasm Resources Conservation Area
  - Küirtix He Endemic Fishes National Aquatic Germplasm Resources Conservation Area
- Bohai Sea
  - Liaodongwan Bohaiwan Laizhouwan National Aquatic Germplasm Resources Conservation Area
- East China Sea
  - Donghai Largehead Hairtail National Aquatic Germplasm Resources Conservation Area [Trichiurus lepturus]
  - Lüsi Yuchang Small Yellow Croaker and Silver Pomfret National Aquatic Germplasm Resources Conservation Area [Pseudosciaena polyactis]-[Pampus argenteus]
- South China Sea
  - Beibuwan Crimson Sea Bream and Redtail Prawn National Aquatic Germplasm Resources Conservation Area [Parargyrops edita]
  - National Aquatic Germplasm Resources Conservation Area at Yongle Atoll Waters of Xisha Islands

== National Domestic Animal Genetic Resources Conservation Areas of China ==
- Ratified by: Ministry of Agriculture and Rural Affairs
- Number of NDAGRCAs (unit): 25 (as at October 30, 2023)
- Total Number of DAGRCAs (unit): TBV
- Shanxi
  - Guangling Donkey National Conservation Area (Guangling County)
- Inner Mongolia
  - Inner Mongolia Cashmere Goat (Alxa Type) National Conservation Area (Alxa Left Banner)
  - Mongolian Horse National Conservation Area (West Ujimqin Banner)
  - Alxa Bactrian Camel National Conservation Area (Alxa Left Banner)
- Jilin
  - Chinese Honeybee (Changbai Mountains Chinese Honeybee) National Conservation Area (Ji'an City/Changbai County/Fusong County/Huadian County/Huinan County/Antu County)
- Heilongjiang
  - Northeast China Black Bee National Conservation Area (Raohe County)
- Jiangsu
  - Erhualian Pig National Conservation Area (Wujin District, Changzhou City)
  - Hu Sheep National Conservation Area (Wuzhong District, Suzhou City)
- Zhejiang
  - Hu Sheep National Conservation Area (Wuxing District, Huzhou City)
- Fujian
  - Jinjiang Horse National Conservation Area (Jinjiang City)
- Shandong
  - Chinese Honeybee (Northern Type) National Conservation Area (Feixian County/Mengyin County)
  - ~~National Bohai Black Cattle Conservation Area~~ (revoked on August 9, 2021)
  - ~~National Dezhou Donkey Conservation Area~~ (revoked on August 9, 2021)
- Hubei
  - Chinese Honeybee (Central China Chinese Honeybee) National Conservation Area (Shennongjia Forestry District)
- Hunan
  - Ningxiang Pig National Conservation Area (Ningxiang County)
- Guangdong
  - Chinese Honeybee (South China Chinese Honeybee) National Conservation Area (Jiaoling County)
- Guangxi
  - ~~National Bose Horse Conservation Area~~ (revoked on August 9, 2021)
- Chongqing
  - Rongchang Pig National Conservation Area (Rongchang County)
- Sichuan
  - Tibetan Pig National Conservation Area (Xiangcheng County)
- Yunnan
  - Tibetan Pig National Conservation Area (Shangêlila County)
- Tibet
  - Tibetan Pig National Conservation Area (Gongbo'gyamda County)
  - Pagri Yak National Conservation Area (Yadong County)
- Gansu
  - Tibetan Pig (Hezuo Pig) National Conservation Area (Hezuo City)
  - Tianzhu White Yak National Conservation Area (Tianzhu County)
  - Chakouyi Horse National Conservation Area (Tianzhu County)
- Xinjiang
  - Hotan Sheep National Conservation Area (Qira County/Yutian County/Lop County)
  - Xinjiang Donkey National Conservation Area (Qira County)
  - Xinjiang Black Bee National Conservation Area (Nilka County)

== See also ==
- China Biosphere Reserve Network
- National Cultural Ecosystem Conservation Areas of China
- List of endangered and protected species of China
- List of national parks of China
