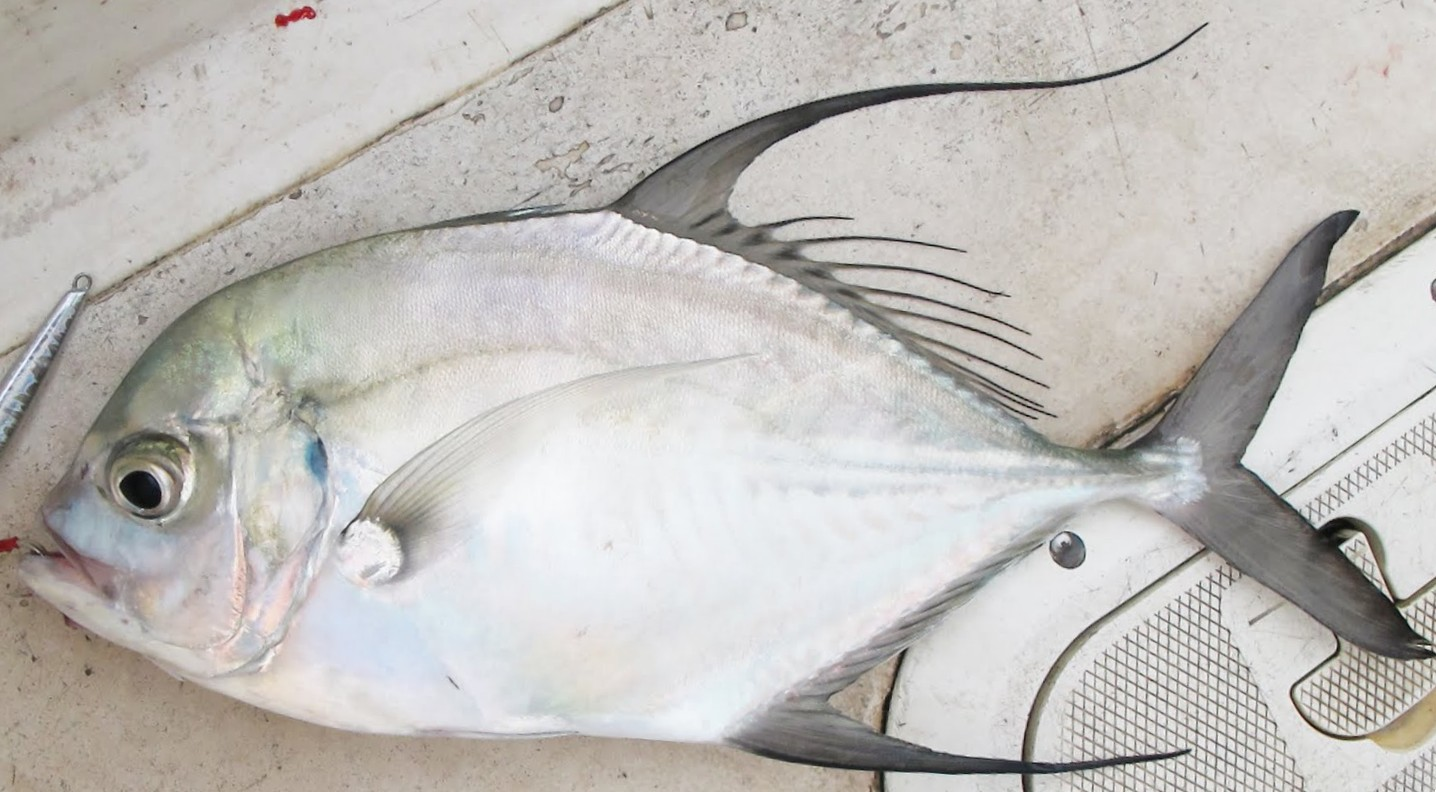

Conservation status
- Least Concern (IUCN 3.1)

Scientific classification
- Kingdom: Animalia
- Phylum: Chordata
- Class: Actinopterygii
- Order: Carangiformes
- Suborder: Carangoidei
- Family: Carangidae
- Genus: Atropus
- Species: A. armatus

Binomial name
- Atropus armatus (Rüppell, 1830)
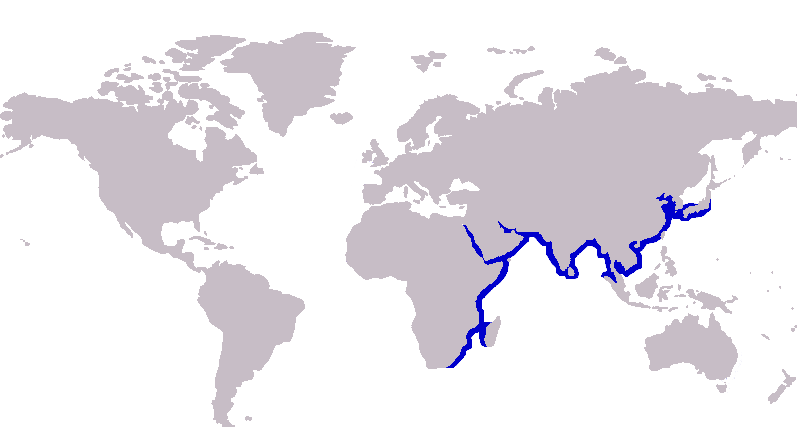
- Approximate range of the longfin trevally

Synonyms
- Sciaena armata Forsskål, 1775; Caranx armatus (Forsskål, 1775); Citula armata (Forsskål, 1775); Citula armatus (Forsskål, 1775); Citula armata Rüppell, 1830; Caranx armatus (Rüppell, 1830); Carangoides armatus (Rüppell, 1830); Caranx ciliaris Cuvier, 1833; Citula ciliaria Rüppell, 1830; Caranx schlegeli Wayima, 1924; Citula pescadorensis Oshima, 1924; Caranx pescadorensis (Oshima, 1924)

= Longfin trevally =

Species of fish

The longfin trevally (Atropus armatus), also known as the longfin kingfish, longfin cavalla or armed trevally, is a species of inshore marine fish in the jack family, Carangidae. The species is common in tropical to subtropical waters of the Indo-Pacific, ranging from South Africa in the west to Japan in the east, typically inhabiting inshore reefs and bays. The species is easily distinguished by its elongate dorsal and anal fin lobes and filamentous dorsal rays, as well as its scaleless breast. Longfin trevally are pelagic predators, taking a variety of small fish, cephalopods and crustaceans, and reach sexual maturity at around 21 cm. The species has a maximum known length of 57 cm and weight of 3.5 kg. The longfin trevally has a very complex taxonomic history which is closely intertwined with another currently valid species, Carangoides ciliarius, which may yet prove to be synonymous. Longfin trevally are of minor importance to fisheries throughout their range and are considered good table fish, and are occasionally taken by anglers.

== Taxonomy and naming ==
The longfin trevally is classified within the genus Carangoides, a group of fish commonly called jacks and trevallies. Carangoides falls into the jack and horse mackerel family Carangidae, the Carangidae are part of the order Carangiformes.

The species was first scientifically described by the German naturalist Eduard Rüppell in 1830, based on a specimen taken from the Red Sea, which was designated to be the holotype. Rüppell named the species Citula armata, placing his new species in what was at the time a valid jack genus created by Georges Cuvier in 1816. Citula was later synonymised with Pseudocaranx, and all its members were re-examined and placed in a number of different jack genera. C. armata became Caranx armatus, also masculinising the species name. Then the species was placed in Carangoides after re-examinations of its anatomy by a number of authors as part of a larger investigation into the taxonomy of the carangid fishes. Finally, the species was placed into Atropus in 2022. The species has been described independently under three different names, with Cuvier applying Caranx ciliaris to the species, Masamitsu Ōshima applying Citula pescadorensis and Yojiro Wakiya Caranx schlegeli. These are all considered to be invalid junior synonyms under ICZN rules.

The complexities of this naming process has led to extensive confusion between this species, originally described as Citula armata, and a very closely related species, Sciaena armata, now probably a synonym of Carangoides ciliarius. Sciaena armata, originally named by Peter Forsskål in 1775, has never been definitively identified, but in the same volume he described C. armatus in, Rüppell created Citula ciliaria. He was unsure if this species was the same fish Forsskål described as S. armatus, and subsequent reviews of this species complex tend to keep Rüppell as the author. Carangoides armatus and Carangoides ciliarius were considered synonymous in a 1975 review of the species, however some authorities still consider them both to be valid species.

== Description ==
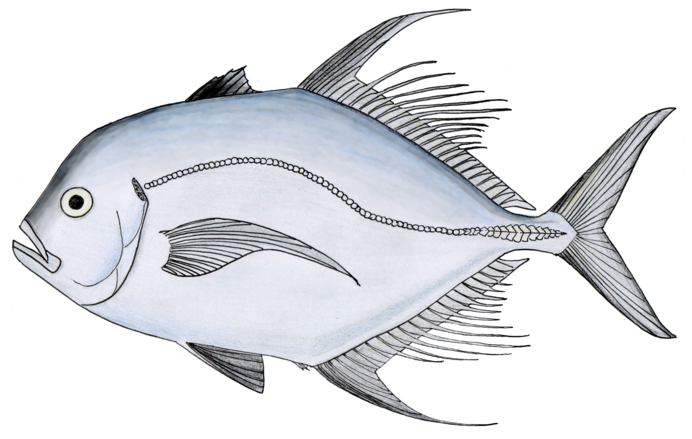
The male longfin trevally has trailing dorsal and anal fin filaments

The longfin trevally has a similar body profile to most other jacks, having a deep, strongly compressed body. It is a medium-sized fish, growing to a maximum known length of 57 cm, and at least 3.5 kg in weight. The profile of the head is very steep from the mouth to the nape, especially in adults. There is a weak adipose eyelid covering the eye, which is about equal to or smaller than the snout length. Both jaws are lined with villiform teeth, although larger specimens have small conical teeth in bands. The gill rakers are one of the diagnostic features of the species, having 30 to 37 rakers on the first arch. The dorsal fin is in two parts, the first consisting of 13 spines and the second of 1 spine followed by 19 to 22 soft rays. The second dorsal fin is sexually dimorphic, with mature males longer than 21 cm having 3 to 12 of the central soft rays extended

into thin filaments of varying lengths. The anal fin has 2 anteriorly detached spines followed by a single spine connected to 16 to 18 soft rays. The lobes of both the anal and dorsal fin are highly extended, giving the species its name. The anal fins also show extension into filaments to a lesser degree. The pectoral fins are falcate to subfalcate with 18–20 rays, while the caudal fin is deeply forked with bilateral, paired caudal keels. The pelvic fins are short, and fit in fairly pronounced ventral grooves, similar to that of Atropus atropos The lateral line is moderately arched anteriorly, with the curved section containing 57 to 77 scales, while the straight section contains 25 to 43 elements, 11 to 24 of which are weak scutes. Another of the diagnostic traits of the longfin trevally is the scaleless breast, extending from the origin of the pelvic fins to the base of the pectoral fin and anteriorly to the gill cover. There are 24 vertebrae in the species.

The longfin trevally's colour is variable with age, although maintains a general colouration of greyish blue above, fading to a whitish silver near the belly region. Younger individuals show a more silver blue dorsally, and have six dark crossbars visible on the body past the pectoral fin base. There is a distinct blackish blotch on the upper margin of the operculum. The first dorsal fin is pale grey to black, while the second dorsal fin and anal fin are both hyaline to black. The pectorals are dusty hyaline, the pelvics are usually black with a white leading edge and the caudal fin is also hyaline, with a dusty trailing edge.

== Distribution and habitat ==
The longfin trevally inhabits tropical to subtropical waters of the Indian and west Pacific Oceans. It is distributed from East London, South Africa in the west, north to Madagascar, eastern Africa, India, Thailand, Hong Kong, Taiwan and to Japan in the east. The species is also common in the Red Sea and the Gulf of Oman.

The species inhabits inshore coastal waters rarely venturing offshore, and is pelagic, inhabiting both the upper and lower sections of the water column. Longfin trevally are commonly found on rocky and coral coastlines, often inhabiting reef complexes, with solitary individuals or groups of larger fish patrolling the edges of reefs. They are also found in shallow, sandy bays and lagoons, with juveniles known to enter and use estuaries as nursery areas.

== Biology and fishery ==
The longfin trevally is a predatory fish, known to take a variety of small fishes, cephalopods including squid, and crustaceans such as crabs and mantis shrimp. The species' long gill rakers also help to filter minute organisms from the seawater, adding to the fish's diet. Longfin trevallies reach sexual maturity at 21 to 22 cm in length. There has been no research into their spawning patterns, although it is known juveniles inhabit shallow bays and occasionally estuaries.

Longfin trevally are generally too rare to be a viable target for commercial fisheries, although they are occasionally landed and sold fresh locally. The species is considered good table fare, although it is highly esteemed in Thailand and Cambodia, where the filets are steamed or fried. Small quantities are taken by recreational fishermen in South Africa, often from boats using fish baits on hook and line gear or lures, as well as by spear.
