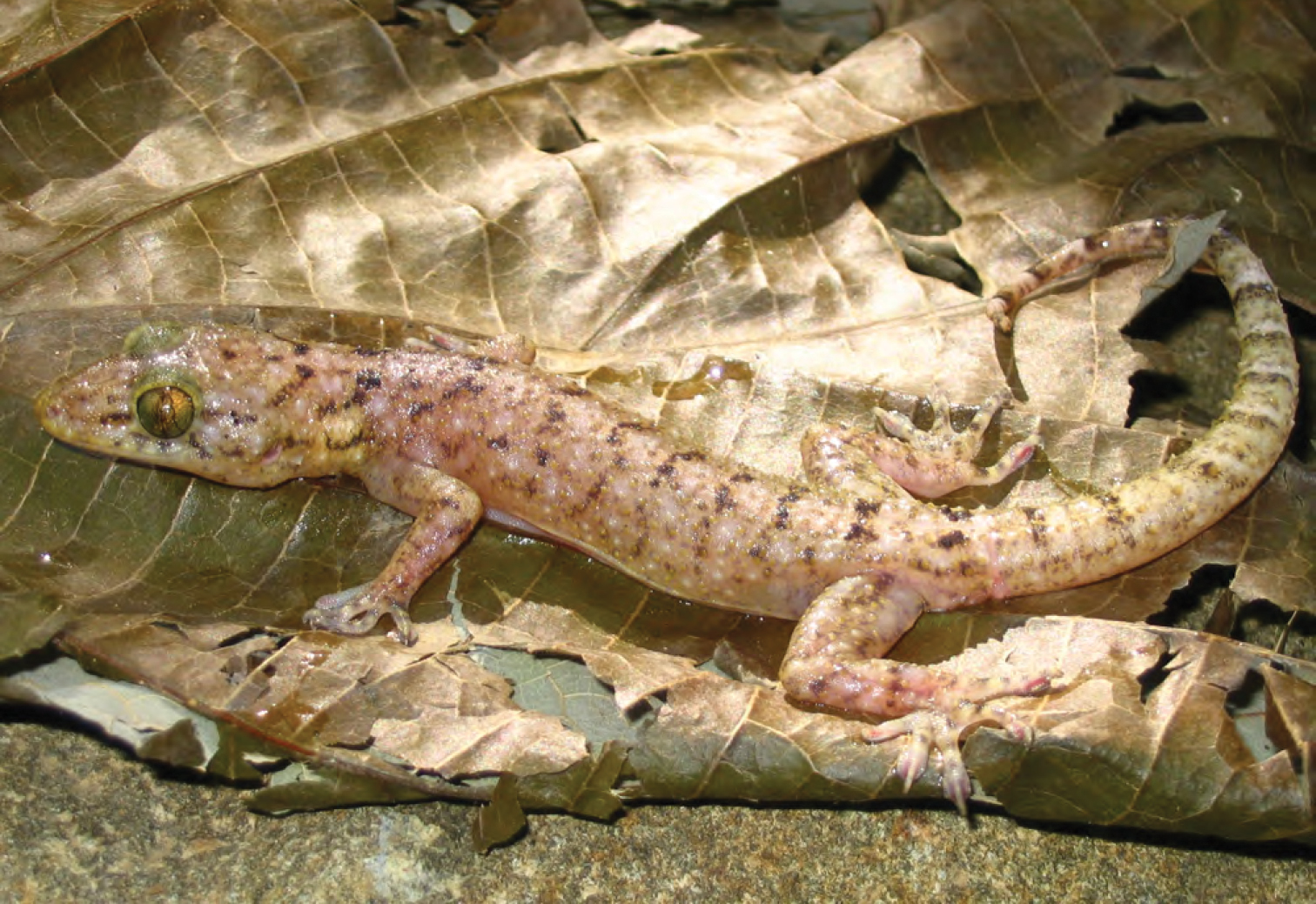
- Gekko kikuchii

Conservation status
- Least Concern (IUCN 3.1)

Scientific classification
- Kingdom: Animalia
- Phylum: Chordata
- Class: Reptilia
- Order: Squamata
- Suborder: Gekkota
- Family: Gekkonidae
- Genus: Gekko
- Species: G. kikuchii

Binomial name
- Gekko kikuchii (Ōshima, 1912)
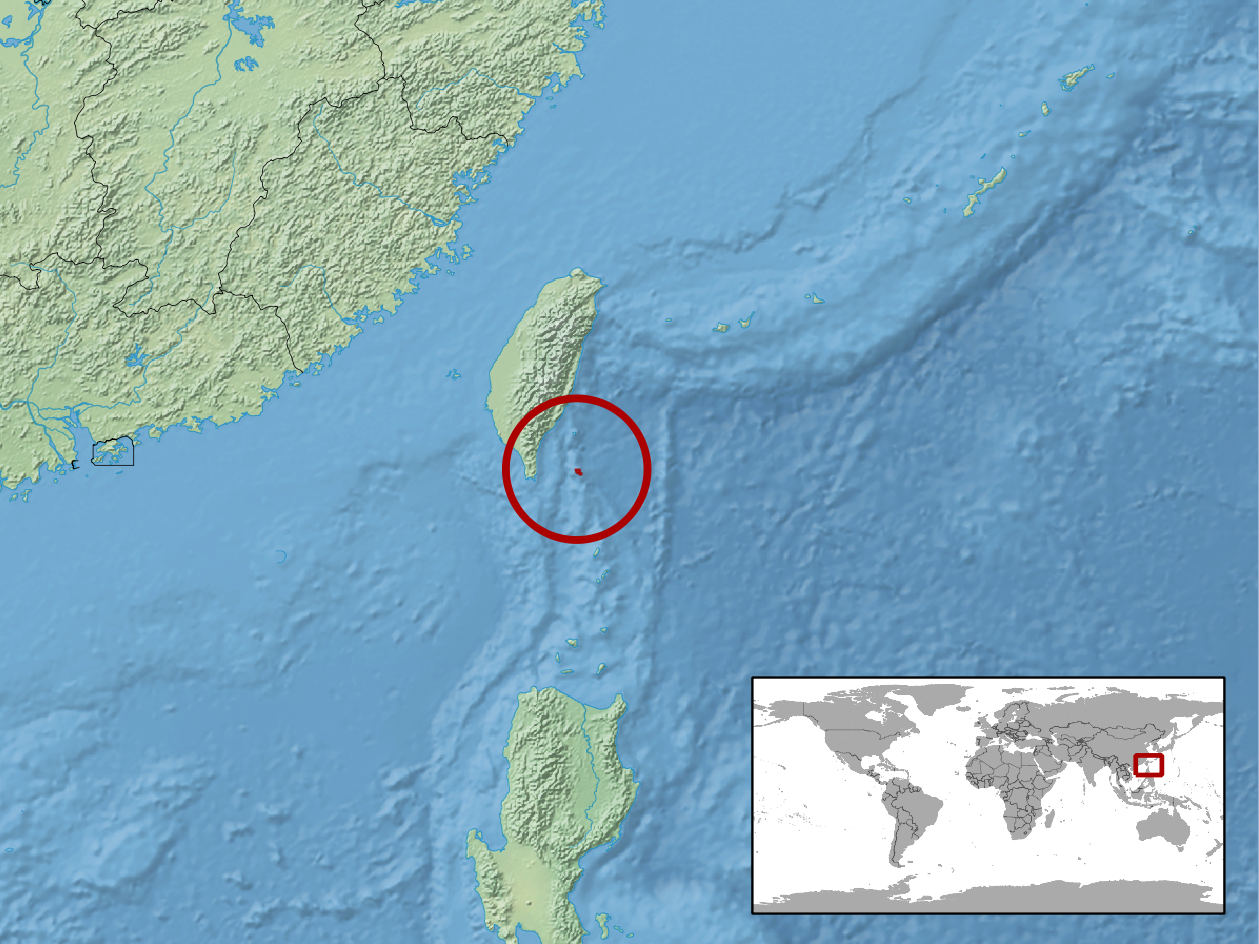

Synonyms
- Gecko kikuchii Ōshima, 1912; Gekko kikuchii Okada, 1936; Gekko monarchus Kuntz & D.Z. Ming, 1970; Gekko kikuchi Ota, 1989

= Botel gecko =

Species of lizard

The Botel gecko (Gekko kikuchii) is a species of gecko, a lizard in the family Gekkonidae. The species is endemic to Orchid Island (also known as Botel Tobago Island) of Taiwan.

== Etymology ==
The specific name, kikuchiii, is in honor of Yonetarō Kikuchi (1869–1921), who collected natural history specimens for the Taipei Museum.

== Habitat ==
The preferred habitat of G. kikuchii is the coastal cliffs of the southern part of the island, flanked with shrubs and secondary forests. It can also penetrate into the forest habitat, but has low density there.

== Reproduction ==
G. kikuchii is oviparous.

== Conservation status ==
G. kikuchii is classified as "endangered" by the Taiwan Wildlife Conservation Act.
