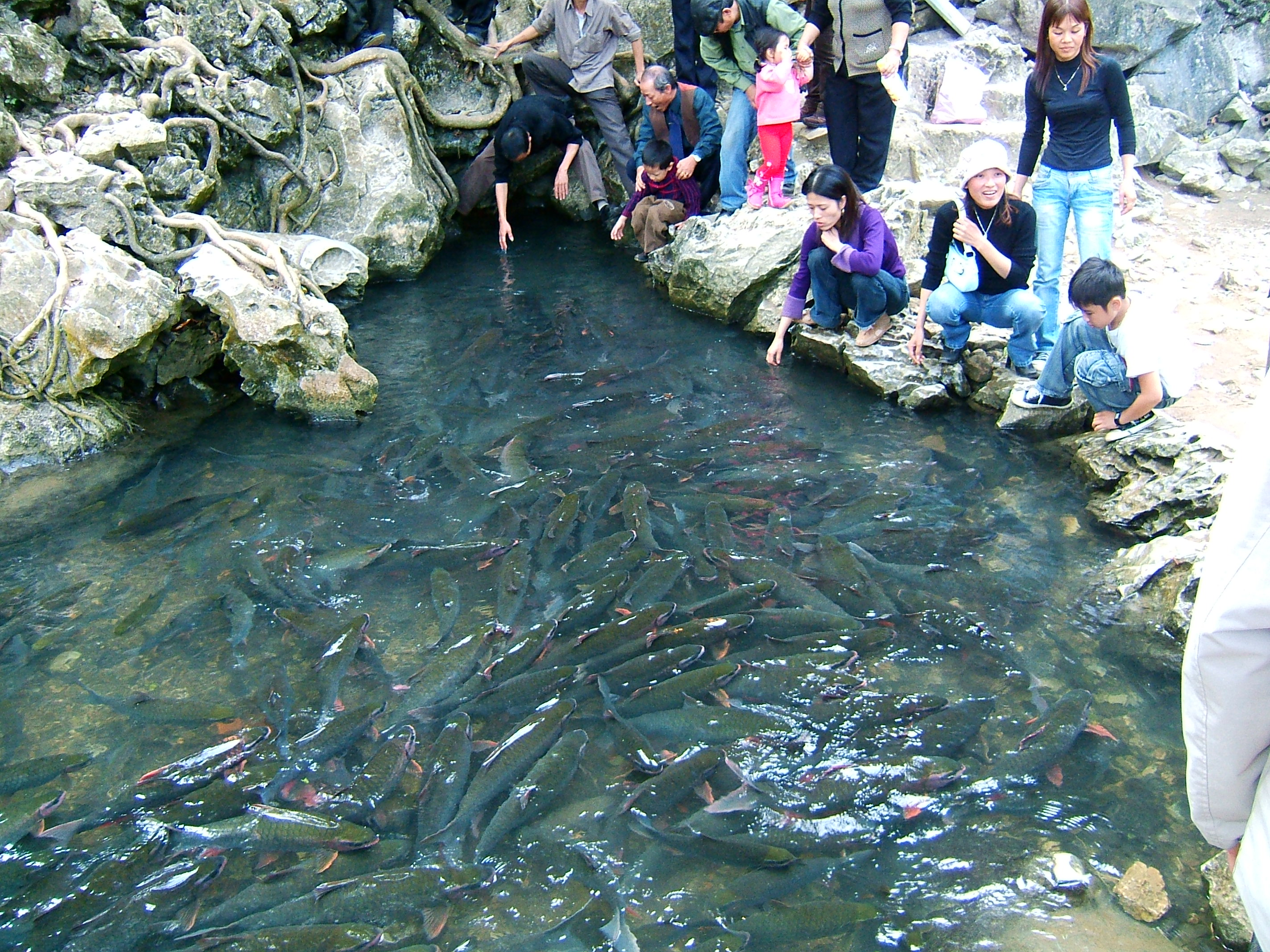
- Many Spinibarbus denticulatus in Cẩm Lương stream, Cẩm Thủy, Vietnam

Conservation status
- Least Concern (IUCN 3.1)

Scientific classification
- Kingdom: Animalia
- Phylum: Chordata
- Class: Actinopterygii
- Order: Cypriniformes
- Family: Cyprinidae
- Genus: Spinibarbichthys
- Species: S. denticulatus

Binomial name
- Spinibarbichthys denticulatus (Ōshima, 1926)

Synonyms
- Spinibarbus denticulatus (Oshima, 1926); Barbodes denticulatus (Oshima, 1926); Barbus sinensis denticulatus (Oshima, 1926); Spinibarbus denticulatus denticulatus (Oshima, 1926); Spinibarbus denticulatus polylepis Chu, 1989; Spinibarbus spinicelatus Koller, 1926; Spinibarbus nammauensis V. H. Nguyễn, 2002

= Spinibarbichthys denticulatus =

Species of fish

Spinibarbichthys denticulatus, the phoenix barb or Chinese phoenix barb, is an Asian species of cyprinid freshwater fish of the subfamily Spinibarbinae. This fish is found in China in the Yuanjiang (Yangtze system) and Pearl basins, freshwater systems of Hainan, and Yangzong and Fuxian Lakes, in Laos in the Mã (Nam Ma) basin, and in Vietnam in the Red, Gâm, Lô and Mã (Nam Ma) basins, and freshwater systems from Nghệ An to Quảng Trị province. It occurs in large to medium rivers, deep pools of streams, in lakes and reservoirs, and it has a quite broad temperature tolerance, between at least 9 and 30 °C (48–86 °F) depending on season. Overall the species is widespread, but some local populations have been reduced due to overfishing, habitat loss and pollution. It is an important food fish that sometimes is aquacultured, and also kept as a garden pond or aquarium fish. Large numbers of the species can be found in the Cẩm Lương stream in Cẩm Thủy, Vietnam, where it is considered sacred and the locals protect and feed it, and it is also a tourist attraction.

S. denticulatus can reach 30 kg (66 lb) in weight and at least 69 cm (27 in) in standard length, although individuals above 8 kg (18 lb) are rare, and a typical size is 1–1.5 kg (2.2–3.3 lb) in weight and 40 cm (16 in) long. Females are generally larger than males of the same age. Whereas immatures are dull-coloued, adults of this fast-growing species have red to the fins and head. During the spawning season both sexes –but especially the males– become more colourful and iridescent. It can live for more than a decade, and it is herbivorous.
