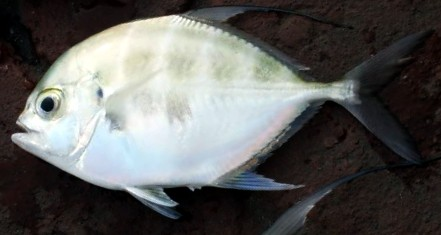

Conservation status
- Least Concern (IUCN 3.1)

Scientific classification
- Kingdom: Animalia
- Phylum: Chordata
- Class: Actinopterygii
- Order: Carangiformes
- Suborder: Carangoidei
- Family: Carangidae
- Genus: Atropus
- Species: A. hedlandensis

Binomial name
- Atropus hedlandensis (Whitley, 1934)
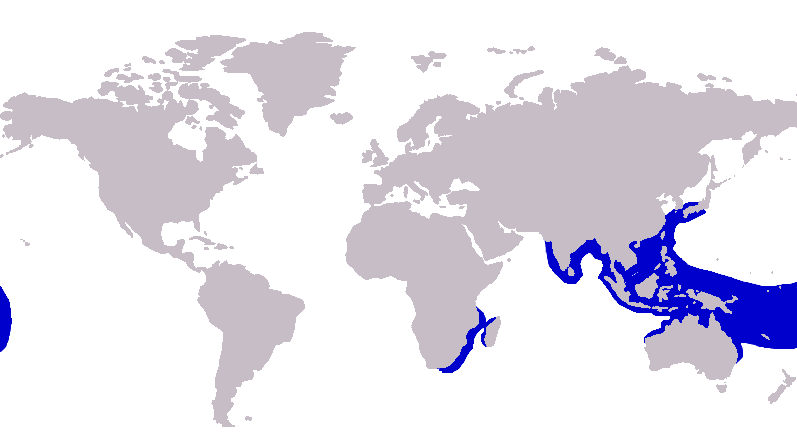
- Approximate range of the bumpnose trevally

Synonyms
- Olistus hedlandensis Whitley, 1934; Caranx hedlandensis (Whitley, 1934); Carangoides hedlandensis (Whitley, 1934)

= Bumpnose trevally =

Species of fish

The bumpnose trevally (Atropus hedlandensis), also known as the bumpnose kingfish or onion kingfish, is a species of relatively small inshore marine fish classified in the jack family Carangidae. The bumpnose trevally is fairly common in the tropical and subtropical waters of the Indo-west Pacific region, ranging from South Africa in the west to Japan and Samoa in the east. It is a small species by carangid standards, reaching a maximum known length of 32 cm (13 in), and can be distinguished from the similarly shaped Atropus armatus by a distinct 'bump' on the snout, which gives the fish its common name. The species inhabits coastal waters, often living along bays and beaches, where it takes shrimp, small crabs, and juvenile fish as prey. The bumpnose trevally is of minor importance to fisheries throughout its range, taken by hook and line, trawls, and seine nets. It is also of minor importance to anglers, taken by baits from beaches and piers, and is considered a modest table fish.

== Taxonomy and naming ==
The bumpnose trevally is classified within the genus Atropus, a group of fish commonly called jacks and trevallies. Atropus falls into the jack and horse mackerel family Carangidae, the Carangidae are part of the order Carangiformes.

The species, as it is currently accepted, was first described and classified by the Australian ichthyologist Gilbert Percy Whitley in 1934 based upon a sample taken from Port Hedland in Western Australia, which was designated to be the holotype. Whitley named the species Olistus hedlandensis, placing the fish in what was at the time a valid genus of jacks. When Olistus was synonymised with Carangoides, the fish was placed either in Caranx or Carangoides, and was accepted as belonging in the latter, until 2022. The specific epithet refers to the type location of the species, Port Hedland. This was not the first time the fish had been described though, with Georges Cuvier applying the name Olistus malabaricus to the species in 1833, which would give it priority over Whitley's name. However, when Olistus was merged into Carangoides, a taxonomic homonym was created with Carangoides malabaricus, thus Whitley's name has been accepted to overcome this problem. The bumpnose trevally is very similar to Carangoides armatus, and appears to have been misidentified as such many times, with 1980 review of the two species finding many misidentified fish in museum collections.

== Description ==
The bumpnose trevally is one of the smaller members of the genus Atropus, growing to a known maximum of 32 cm (13 in) in length. It is quite similar in appearance to a number of co-occurring trevallies, especially Atropus armatus and Atropus atropos, with the simplest identifying feature being the distinct break in the contour ('bump') of the interorbital region, which becomes more pronounced with increasing size. The body is compressed and deep, with the head profile very steep in adults, leading to a more convex dorsal profile in comparison to the ventral profile. The dorsal fin is in two sections, the first consisting of eight spines while the second has one spine and between 20 and 22 soft rays. The anal fin has two anteriorly detached spines followed by 1 spine and 16 to 18 soft rays, while the pelvic fin has one spine and 18 soft rays. The lobes of the second dorsal and anal fins are elongated and filamentous, being longer than the head. In males, a number of the central soft rays are also produced into filaments of varying lengths. The lateral line has a moderate anterior arch, which contains 63 to 70 scales, while the straight section has eight to 14 scales and 21 to 27 scutes. The curved and straight sections intersect below the 10th to 12th soft rays of the second dorsal fin. The breast is devoid of scales, with the scaleless area extending to the origin of the pelvic fins and up to the base of the pectoral fins. Both jaws have bands of villiform teeth, which are widest anteriorly. It has a total of 20 to 27 gill rakers and 24 vertebrae.

The body of the bumpnose trevally is a silvery green-blue above, becoming more silvery-white below, with a dark blotch present on the operculum. The spinous dorsal fin and the soft dorsal fin rays are black, while the anal fin is brownish, with the filaments and lobe often blackish. The caudal fin has black trailing and leading edges, and the pelvic fin is dusky to black. Juveniles often have five to seven vertical crossbars on their sides.

== Distribution and habitat ==
The bumpnose trevally is widely distributed in the tropical and subtropical regions of the Indian and west Pacific Oceans. In the Indian Ocean, the species ranges from South Africa, Madagascar, and the Seychelles north along east Africa to Mozambique, but has no records further north until India and Sri Lanka. Its distribution extends into Southeast Asia, Indonesia, Papua New Guinea, and northern Australia, with the species extending as far north as Japan and as far east as Samoa in the Pacific.

The bumpnose trevally is an inshore fish, rarely venturing to depths greater than 50 m. It inhabits sandy bays and beaches, and appears to be quite tolerant of turbid waters, often living in the dirty waters near river mouths. Despite this, it appears to have a fairly low tolerance to reduced salinities and is not found in estuaries themselves.

== Biology and fishery ==
The bumpnose trevally is usually founds in small groups of two or more, swimming along beaches where they take prey which consists of shrimp, small crabs, and fish. Studies on the North West Shelf of Australia have found the species often aggregates with other carangids, particularly Carangichthys humerosus, Atropus aurochs, and Selaroides leptolepis, and together these make up a large proportion of the resident fish fauna. Reproduction in the species is very poorly known, with young fish often showing up in South Africa during summer.

The bumpnose trevally is of minor importance to fisheries throughout its range, caught using hook and line, bottom trawls, beach seines, and various fish traps. In some areas, such as Fiji, it is of more importance, but no catch statistics are available for the species. It is also of minor importance to anglers, often taken from beaches and piers using baits, and is considered marginal table fare.
