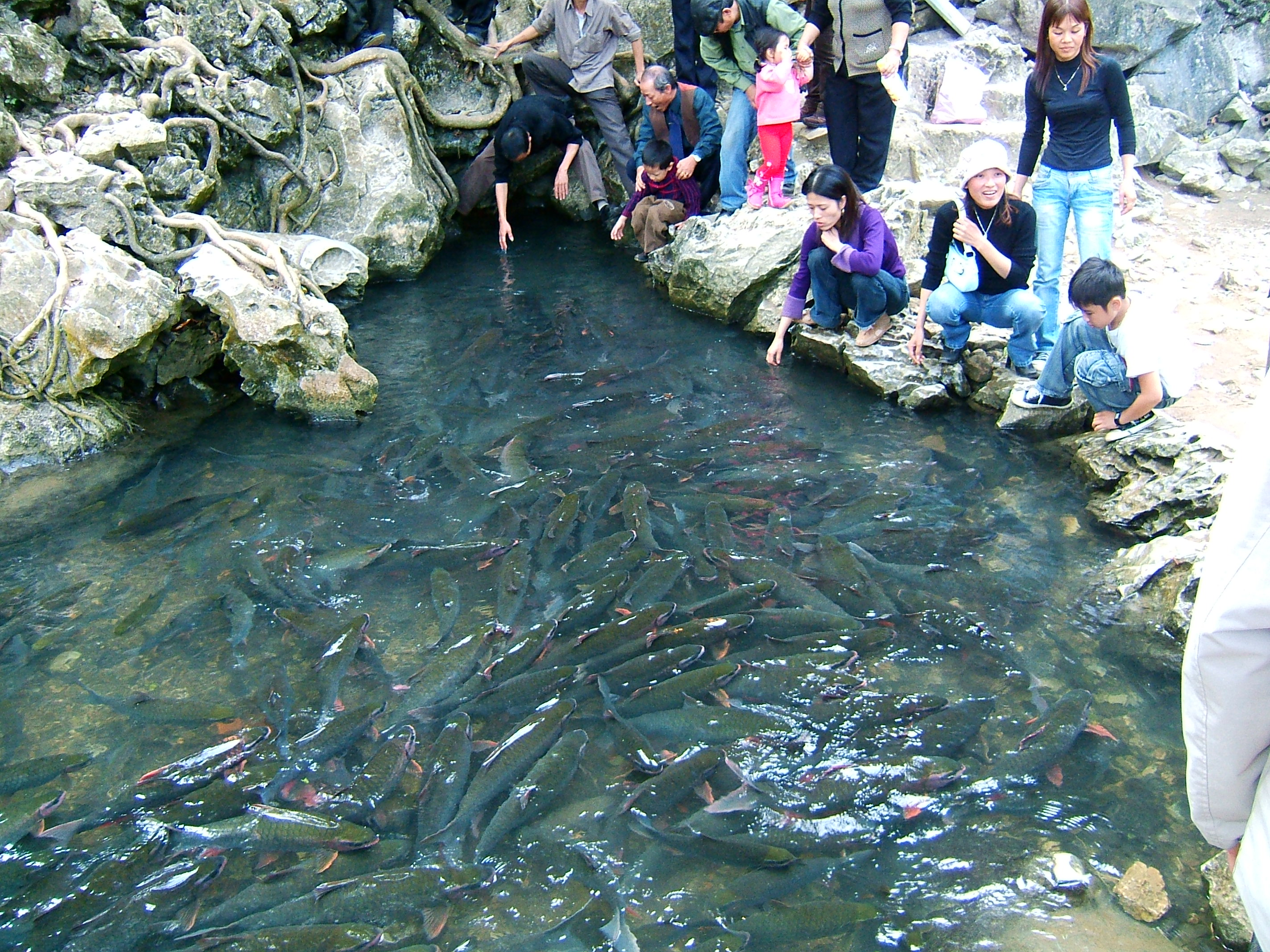
- Spinibarbichthys denticulatus (phoenix barb) in Cẩm Lương stream, Cẩm Thủy, Vietnam

Scientific classification
- Kingdom: Animalia
- Phylum: Chordata
- Class: Actinopterygii
- Order: Cypriniformes
- Family: Cyprinidae
- Subfamily: Spinibarbinae
- Genus: Spinibarbichthys; Ōshima, 1926

Type species
- Spinibarbichthys denticulatus Ōshima, 1926

= Spinibarbichthys =

Genus of fishes

Spinibarbichthys is a genus of freshwater ray-finned fishes belonging to the family Cyprinidae, the family which includes the carps, barbs and related fishes. The fishes in this genus are found in China and Southeast Asia.

== Species ==
Spinibarbichthys contains the following species:

- Spinibarbichthys denticulatus Ōshima, 1926
- Spinibarbichthys maensis (Nguyen, Duong & Tran, 2007)
- Spinibarbichthys nguyenhuuduci (V. H. Nguyễn, V.T. Do, T. H. T. Nguyễn & T.D.P. Nguyễn, 2015)
- Spinibarbichthys nigripinnis (V. H. Nguyễn, V.T. Do, T. H. T. Nguyễn & T.D.P. Nguyễn, 2015)
- Spinibarbichthys nigriventralis (V. H. Nguyễn & T. H. N. Vũ, 2012)
- Spinibarbichthys ovalius (V. H. Nguyễn & Ngô, 2002)
- Spinibarbichthys yunnanensis (S. L. Tsü, 1977)
