= Carangoides ciliarius =

Scientific classification
- Kingdom: Animalia
- Phylum: Chordata
- Class: Actinopterygii
- Order: Carangiformes
- Suborder: Carangoidei
- Family: Carangidae
- Genus: Carangoides
- Species: C. ciliarius

Binomial name
- Carangoides ciliarius (Rüppell, 1830)

Species of fish

Carangoides ciliarius is a dubious species of marine fish in the jack and horse mackerel family, Carangidae. The validity of the species has been questioned by a number of authors, with many concluding it is a synonym of the similar Carangoides armatus, commonly known as the longfin trevally. However, this synonymy has not been accepted by all authorities, with Fishbase and ITIS both recognising it as a valid species. Like Carangoides armatus, the species is occasionally referred to as the 'longfin kingfish'.

== Taxonomy ==
The species, as it is currently recognised, was scientifically described and named by the German naturalist Eduard Rüppell in 1830, based on the holotype specimen taken from Massawa in the Red Sea. Rüppell named the fish Citula ciliaria, placing the species in what was at the time a valid genus of jacks. As the classification of the carangids was reviewed, Citula was synonymised with Pseudocaranx, with C. ciliaria transferred to Carangoides, and the specific name changed from ciliaria to ciliarius, leading to the currently accepted combination. There is a possibility that Peter Forsskål described and named the species earlier, in 1775, which would make him the correct author under ICZN rules. He named a species Sciaena armata, but the description has been too vague to make any certain conclusions, and this name is considered a nomen dubium that cannot hold priority, and placed in synonymy with C. ciliarius.

Georges Cuvier independently renamed the species as Caranx citula in 1833, also making reference to the name Caranx cirrhosus as a synonym of his new name. This name was apparently coined by Christian Gottfried Ehrenberg, although never properly published. These two names are considered to be junior synonyms under ICZN naming rules and are no longer valid.

=== Synonymy with Carangoides armatus ===
There has been extensive confusion in the ichthyological literature between C. ciliarius and C. armatus. Rüppell described both 'species' in the same volume, and a 1973 paper by Margret Smith concluded he merely described both a young and an old individual of the same species. She recommended that C. ciliarius be given priority due to the fact it appears first in the book. A similar mistake involving misidentification of age stages apparently occurred in a 1937 analysis of carangids by Yojiro Wakiya, who divided C. armatus into four separate species, one of them being C. ciliarius. The most recent investigation into this taxonomic problem occurred in 1980, when Williams and Venkataramani confirmed synonymy between C. armatus and C. ciliarius, but recommended the name Carangoides armatus be kept.

Most modern publications now list C. ciliarius as a synonym of C. armatus, with the last major revision of Indo-Pacific carangids also reaffirming this. Nevertheless, two major taxonomic authorities, Fishbase and ITIS, list the species as valid based on an older version of California Academy of Sciences Catalog of Fishes, which now treats C. ciliarus as synonymous with Carangoides armatus. This name is occasionally used in non-scientific literature such as fishing publications, although the common name given to the fish, 'longfin kingfish', is also applied to Carangoides armatus.

== See also ==
- Longfin trevally, Carangoides armatus, for a description of the species appearance and distribution
