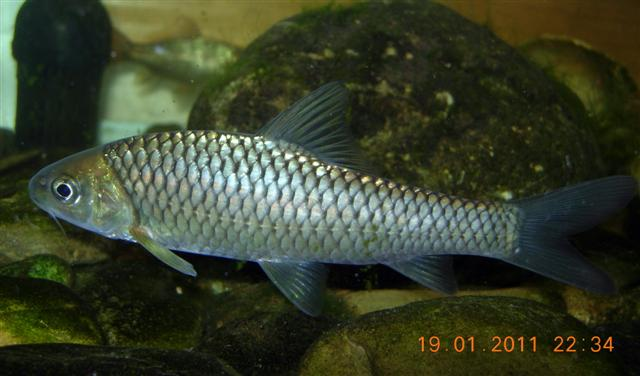
- Spinibarbis sinensis

Scientific classification
- Kingdom: Animalia
- Phylum: Chordata
- Class: Actinopterygii
- Order: Cypriniformes
- Family: Cyprinidae
- Subfamily: Spinibarbinae
- Genus: Spinibarbus; Ōshima, 1919

Type species
- Spinibarbus hollandi Oshima, 1919

= Spinibarbus =

Genus of fishes

Spinibarbus is a genus of cyprinid fish found in eastern Asia. There are currently ten described species in this genus.

== Species ==
- Spinibarbus babeensis V. H. Nguyễn, 2001
- Spinibarbus brevicephalus H. D. Nguyễn & V. H. Nguyen, 1997
- Spinibarbus caldwelli (Nichols, 1925)
- Spinibarbus hoenoti V. H. Nguyễn, V.T. Do, T. H. T. Nguyễn & T.D.P. Nguyễn, 2015
- Spinibarbus hollandi Ōshima, 1919
- Spinibarbus polylepis X. L. Chu, 1989
- Spinibarbus sinensis (Bleeker, 1871)
- Spinibarbus vittatus V. H. Nguyễn & H. D. Nguyễn, 1997
