= Spinibarbichthys ovalius =

Conservation status
- Data Deficient (IUCN 3.1)

Scientific classification
- Kingdom: Animalia
- Phylum: Chordata
- Class: Actinopterygii
- Division: Teleostei
- Order: Cypriniformes
- Family: Cyprinidae
- Genus: Spinibarbichthys
- Species: S. ovalius

Binomial name
- Spinibarbichthys ovalius (V. H. Nguyễn & Ngô, 2001)

Synonyms
- Spinibarbus ovalius V. H. Nguyễn & Ngô, 2001

Species of fish

Spinibarbichthys ovalius is a species of cyprinid of the subfamily Spinibarbinae. It inhabits Vietnam and is considered harmless to humans. It has been classified as "data deficient" on the IUCN Red List.
