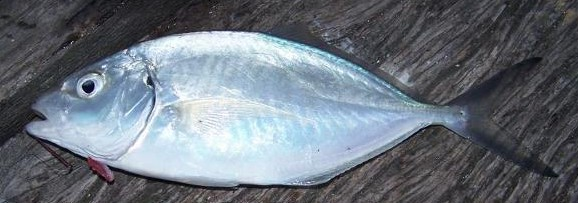
- Silver trevally

Conservation status
- Least Concern (IUCN 3.1)

Scientific classification
- Kingdom: Animalia
- Phylum: Chordata
- Class: Actinopterygii
- Order: Carangiformes
- Suborder: Carangoidei
- Family: Carangidae
- Genus: Pseudocaranx
- Species: P. georgianus

Binomial name
- Pseudocaranx georgianus Cuvier, 1833

= Pseudocaranx georgianus =

Species of fish

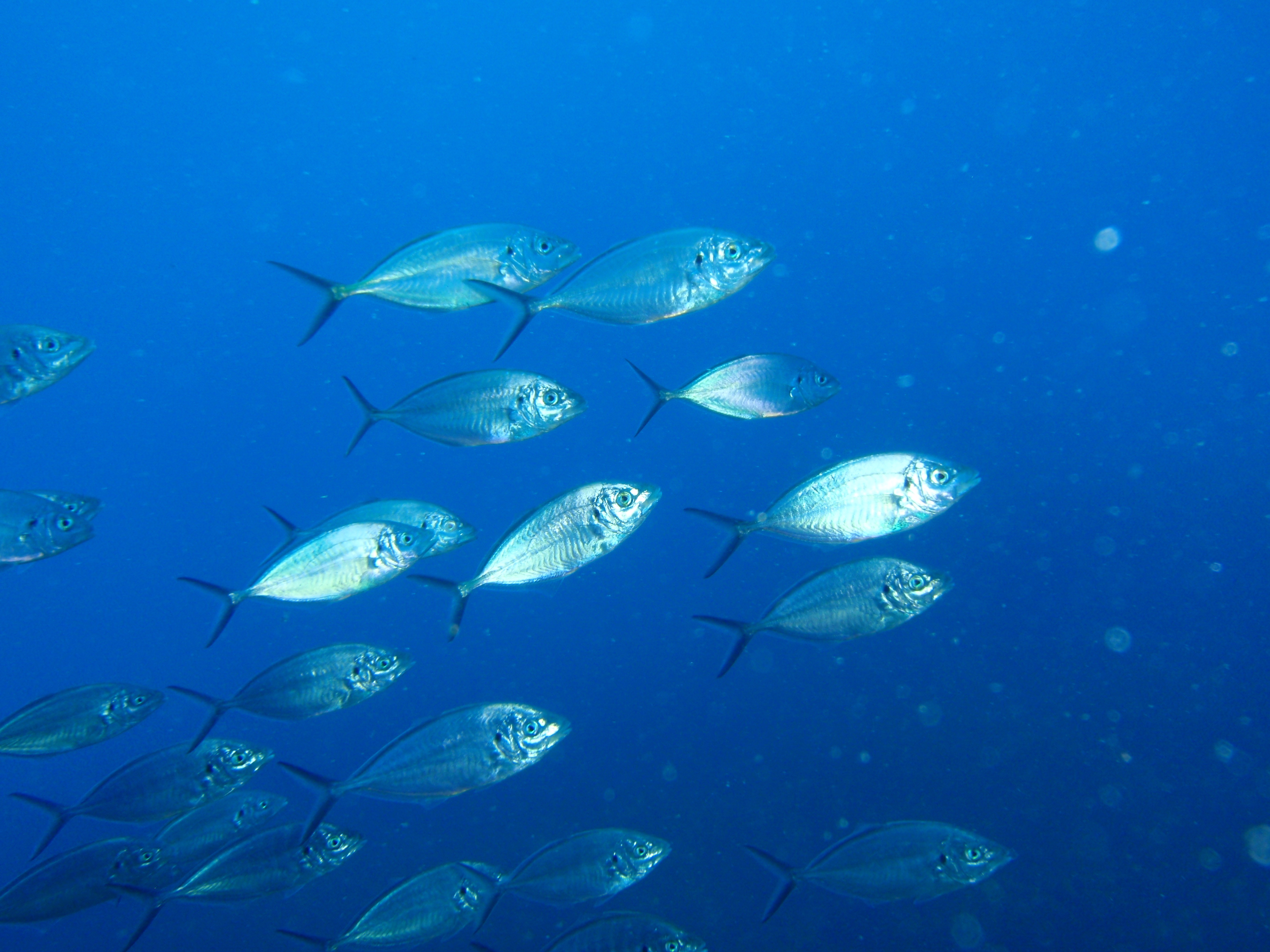
School of Silver trevally

Silver trevally, Pseudocaranx georgianus, (also known as skippy, skipjack trevally and silver bream) is a jack of the family Carangidae found around the coast of Australia and New Zealand.

== Description ==
The fish can grow to a length of 1.2 m (3 ft 11 in) and weigh up to 18 kg (40 lb). More typically, it has a length of 35 to 60 cm (14 to 24 in) and a weight of 0.4 to 2.5 kg (0.88 to 5.51 lb). The species can live as long as 25 years. They have compressed and elongated bodies, the upper portion is a bluish-silver colour, the belly is silver, and the sides are a yellow-silver shade. A small black blotch is found on the bony flap covering the gills. The fish have two dorsal fins, two small, detached spines in front of the rear fin, and a deeply forked tail fin. Between two and four years of age, the silver trevally becomes sexually mature and is able to reproduce. Spawning happens in estuaries and deeper waters between spring and autumn over an extended period; the females can produce between 50,000 and 200.000 eggs over the course of a season.

== Taxonomy ==
The species was first formally described by the biologist Georges Cuvier in 1833 as part of the work Histoire Naturelle des Poissons as described from the type specimen caught at King George Sound near Albany in Western Australia. Synonyms include: Usacaranx nobilis, Caranx georgianus, Usacaranx georgianus, Caranx nobilis and Caranx platessa. It was often confused with the widely distributed anti-tropical species Pseudocaranx dentex. Fishbase regards this taxon as a junior synonym of P. dentex.

== Distribution ==
The species is found in estuarine and coastal waters of southern Australia. On the east coast, it occurs around areas north of Sydney then the range follows the coast south around Victoria and around Tasmania and west through South Australia to Western Australia to around areas north of Perth. It is also found in waters around New Zealand. Silver trevally are known to frequent rocky areas along bays and coastal waters in depths to 200 m (660 ft). Juvenile fish are often associated with bays, estuaries, and shallower waters of the continental shelf. Adult fish commonly inhabit large bays and inlets and areas of inshore reef and over open substrate composed of gravel or sand.
