= Ulua =

Ulua may refer to:

- Ulúa River
- San Juan de Ulúa, a complex located on an island of the same name in the Gulf of Mexico
- USS Ulua (SS-428), a submarine of the United States Navy
- Ulua (fish), a genus of fishes in the family Carangidae
- vernacular name of the species giant trevally (Caranx ignobilis), but not in genus Ulua proper
- Ulua people, an indigenous people of El Salvador and Nicaragua.
