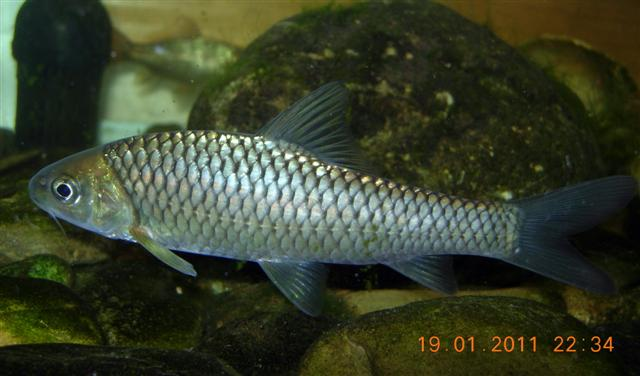

Scientific classification
- Kingdom: Animalia
- Phylum: Chordata
- Class: Actinopterygii
- Order: Cypriniformes
- Family: Cyprinidae
- Genus: Spinibarbus
- Species: S. sinensis

Binomial name
- Spinibarbus sinensis Bleeker, 1871

= Spinibarbus sinensis =

Species of fish

Spinibarbus sinensis is a species of cyprinid of the subfamily Spinibarbinae. It inhabits China and is considered harmless to humans. It grows to 47.1 cm (18.5 in) total length. It has not been classified on the IUCN Red List.
