= Spinibarbichthys maensis =

Conservation status
- Data Deficient (IUCN 3.1)

Scientific classification
- Kingdom: Animalia
- Phylum: Chordata
- Class: Actinopterygii
- Order: Cypriniformes
- Family: Cyprinidae
- Genus: Spinibarbichthys
- Species: S. maensis

Binomial name
- Spinibarbichthys maensis Nguyen, Duong & Tran, 2007

Species of fish

Spinibarbichthys maensis is a species of cyprinid of the subfamily Spinibarbinae. It inhabits Vietnam and is considered harmless to humans. It has been classified as "data deficient" on the IUCN Red List.
