= Aphyocypris kikuchii =

Scientific classification
- Kingdom: Animalia
- Phylum: Chordata
- Class: Actinopterygii
- Order: Cypriniformes
- Family: Xenocyprididae
- Genus: Aphyocypris
- Species: A. kikuchii

Binomial name
- Aphyocypris kikuchii (Ōshima, 1919)

Synonyms
- Phoxiscus kikuchii Ōshima, 1919

Species of fish

Aphyocypris kikuchii is a species of freshwater ray-finned fish belonging to the family Xenocyprididae, the East Asian minnows or sharpbellies. It is endemic to Taiwan. It is a benthopelagic freshwater fish that grows to 8 cm (3.1 in) total length.

Aphyocypris kikuchii has a low dispersal capability, which in turn leads to reduced gene flow between populations and higher genetic differentiation. During the past few decades, its populations have diminished immensely due to habitat degradation. These circumstances have led the species to be assigned with the endangered status.

It is named in honor of Yonetaro Kikuchi (1869–1921), collector for the Taipei Museum in Formosa (Taiwan), who collected the type specimen.
