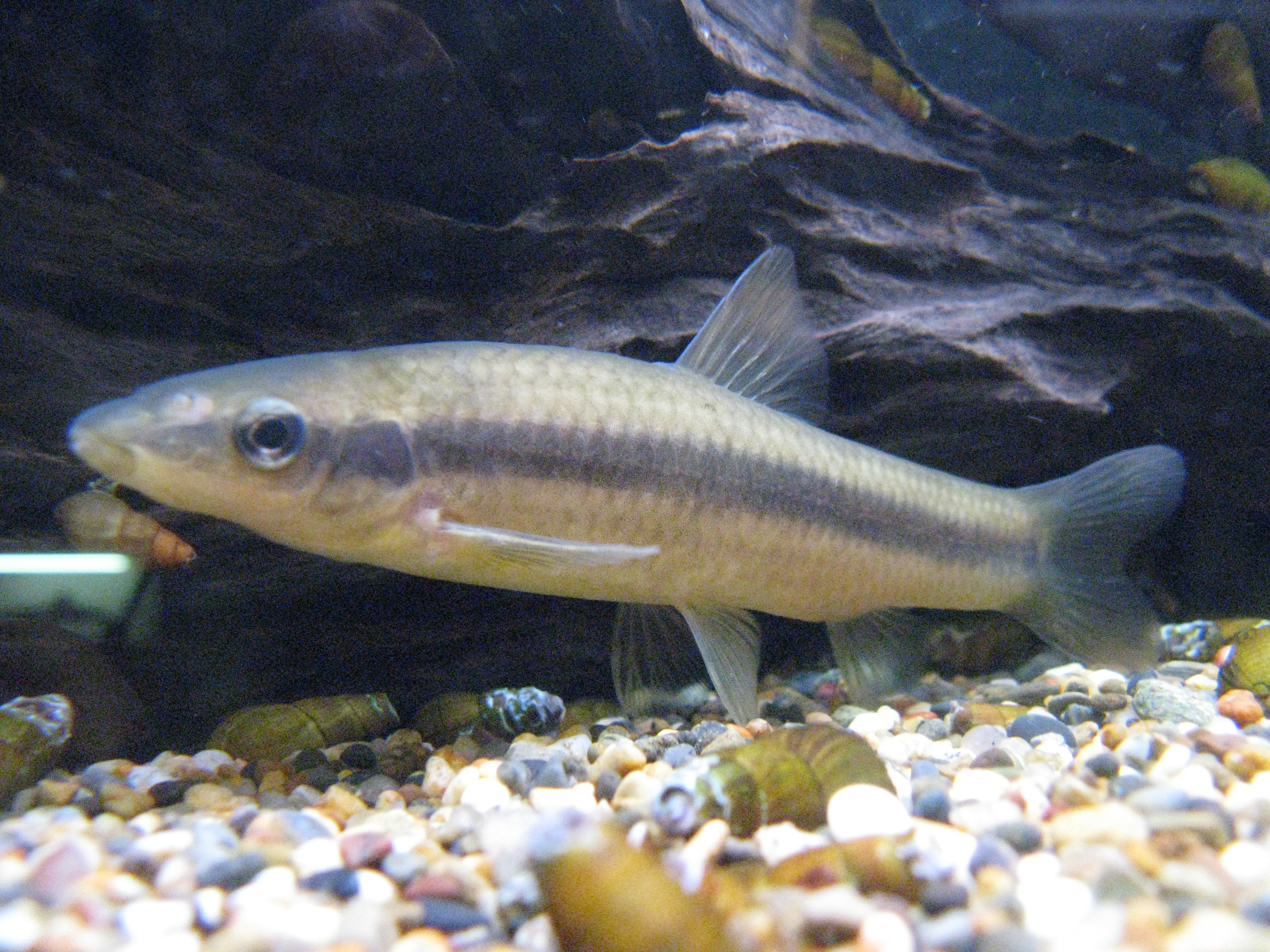
- Pungtungia herzi

Scientific classification
- Kingdom: Animalia
- Phylum: Chordata
- Class: Actinopterygii
- Order: Cypriniformes
- Family: Gobionidae
- Genus: Pungtungia; Herzenstein, 1892

Type species
- Pungtungia herzi Herzenstein, 1892

Synonyms
- Zezera Jordan & Fowler, 1903

= Pungtungia =

Genus of fishes

Pungtungia is a genus of freshwater ray-finned fish belonging to the family Gobionidae, the gudgeons. The fishes in this genus are found in Eastern Asia.

== Species ==
There are currently three recognized species in this genus:

- Pungtungia herzi Herzenstein, 1892
- Pungtungia hilgendorfi (D. S. Jordan & Fowler, 1903)
- Pungtungia shiraii Ōshima, 1957
