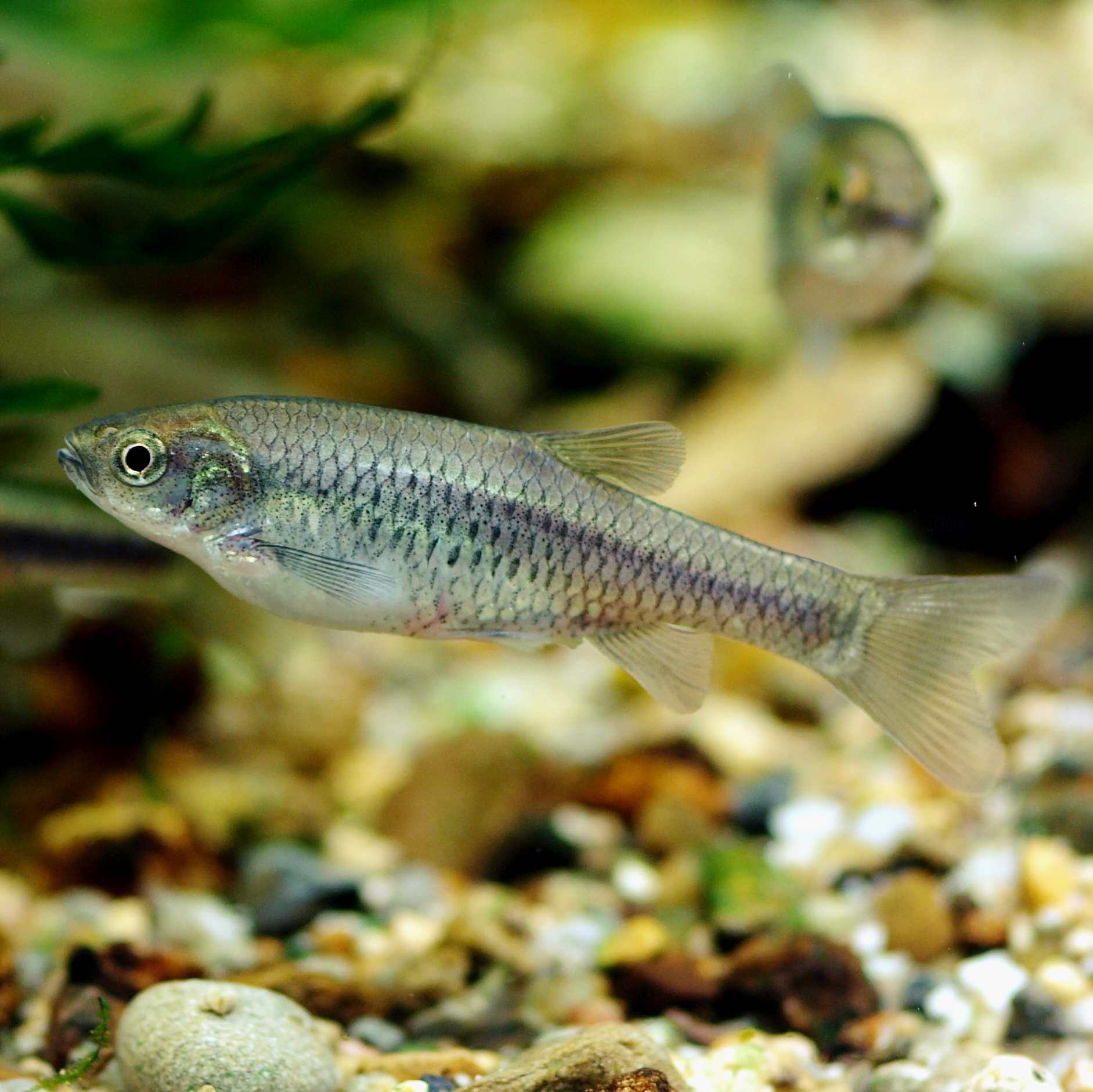
- Aphyocypris chinensis

Scientific classification
- Kingdom: Animalia
- Phylum: Chordata
- Class: Actinopterygii
- Order: Cypriniformes
- Family: Xenocyprididae
- Genus: Aphyocypris; Günther, 1868

Type species
- Aphyocypris chinensis Günther, 1868

Synonyms
- Aphyocyprioides Tang, 1942; Caraspius Nichols, 1925; Fusania Jordan & Starks, 1905; Nicholsicypris Chu, 1935; Phoxiscus Ōshima 1919; Yaoshanicus Lin, 1931

= Aphyocypris =

Genus of fishes

Aphyocypris is a genus of freshwater ray-finned fishes belonging to the family Xenocyprididae. This genus has eight valid species, all of which are restricted to East Asia.

== Species ==
These are the currently recognized species in this genus:

- Aphyocypris arcus (S. Y. Lin, 1931) (Yaoshan carp)
- Aphyocypris chinensis Günther, 1868 (Chinese bleak)
- Aphyocypris dorsohorizontalis (Nguyen & Doan, 1969)
- Aphyocypris kikuchii (Ōshima, 1919)
- Aphyocypris normalis Nichols & C. H. Pope, 1927
- Aphyocypris pulchrilineata Y. Zhu, Y. H. Zhao & K. Huang, 2013
- Aphyocypris robertsi Endruweit, 2025

Synonyms

- Aphyocypris amnis T. Y. Liao, S. O. Kullander & H. D. Lin, 2011; valid as Pararasbora moltrechti
- Aphyocypris kyphus (Mai, 1978); valid as A. dorsohorizontalis
