= Spinibarbus babeensis =

Conservation status
- Data Deficient (IUCN 3.1)

Scientific classification
- Kingdom: Animalia
- Phylum: Chordata
- Class: Actinopterygii
- Order: Cypriniformes
- Family: Cyprinidae
- Genus: Spinibarbus
- Species: S. babeensis

Binomial name
- Spinibarbus babeensis Nguyen, 2001

Species of fish

Spinibarbus babeensis is a species of cyprinid of the subfamily Spinibarbinae. It inhabits Vietnam. It is considered harmless to humans and is classified as "data deficient" on the IUCN Red List.
