= Cẩm Thủy district =

Coordinates: 20.167°N 105.417°E

Cẩm Thủy district Huyện Cẩm Thủy
- District
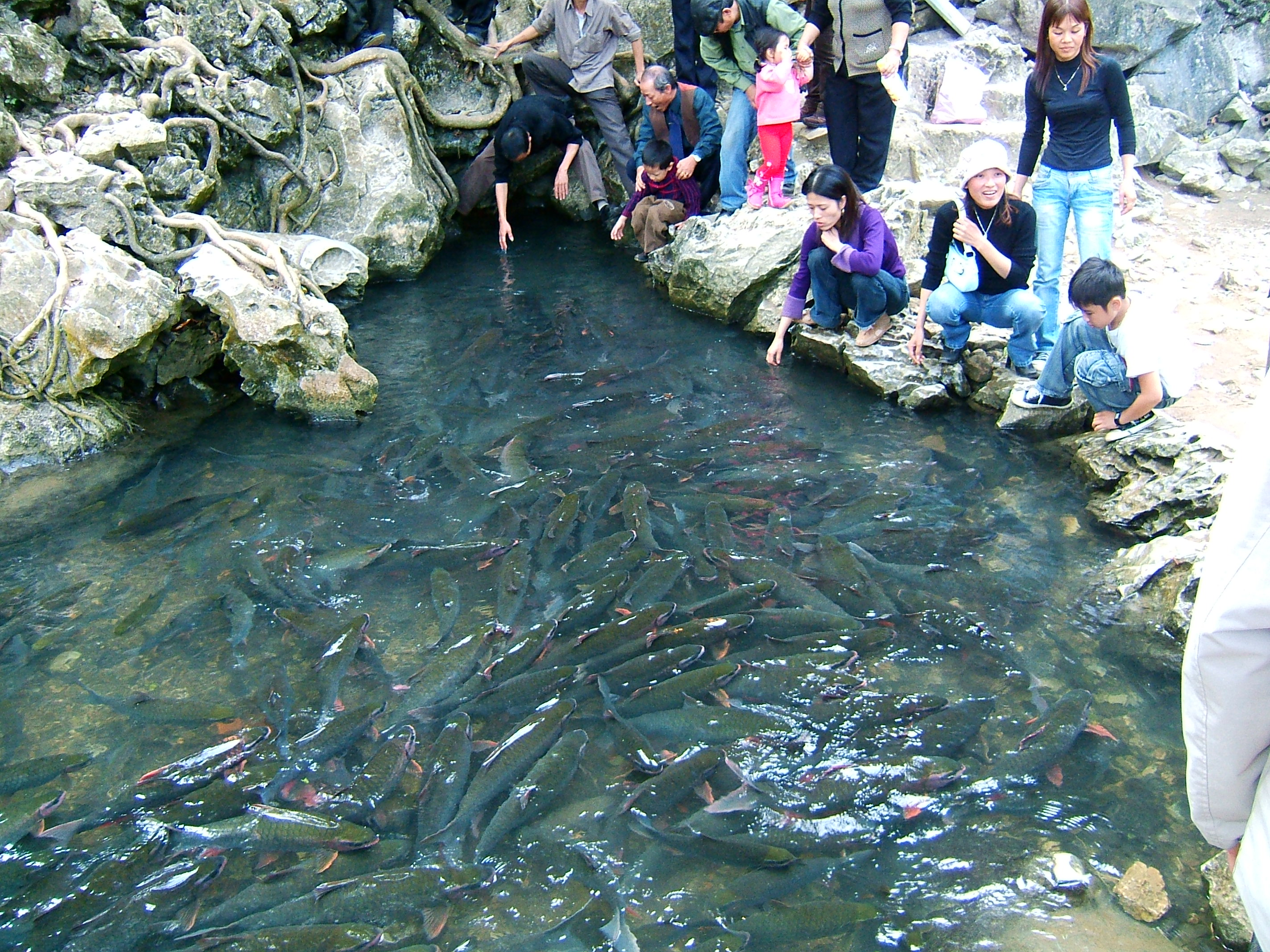
- Cẩm Lương fish stream with Spinibarbus denticulatus
- Interactive map of Cẩm Thủy district
- Country: Vietnam
- Region: North Central Coast
- Province: Thanh Hóa
- Capital: Cẩm Thủy

Area
  - Total: 170 sq mi (430 km^{2})

Population (2018)
  - Total: 113,580
- Time zone: UTC+7 (UTC + 7)

Cẩm Thủy is a former district (huyện) of Thanh Hóa province in the North Central Coast region of Vietnam.

As of 2003 the district had a population of 110,815. The district covers an area of 430 km^{2}. The district capital lies at Cẩm Thủy.
