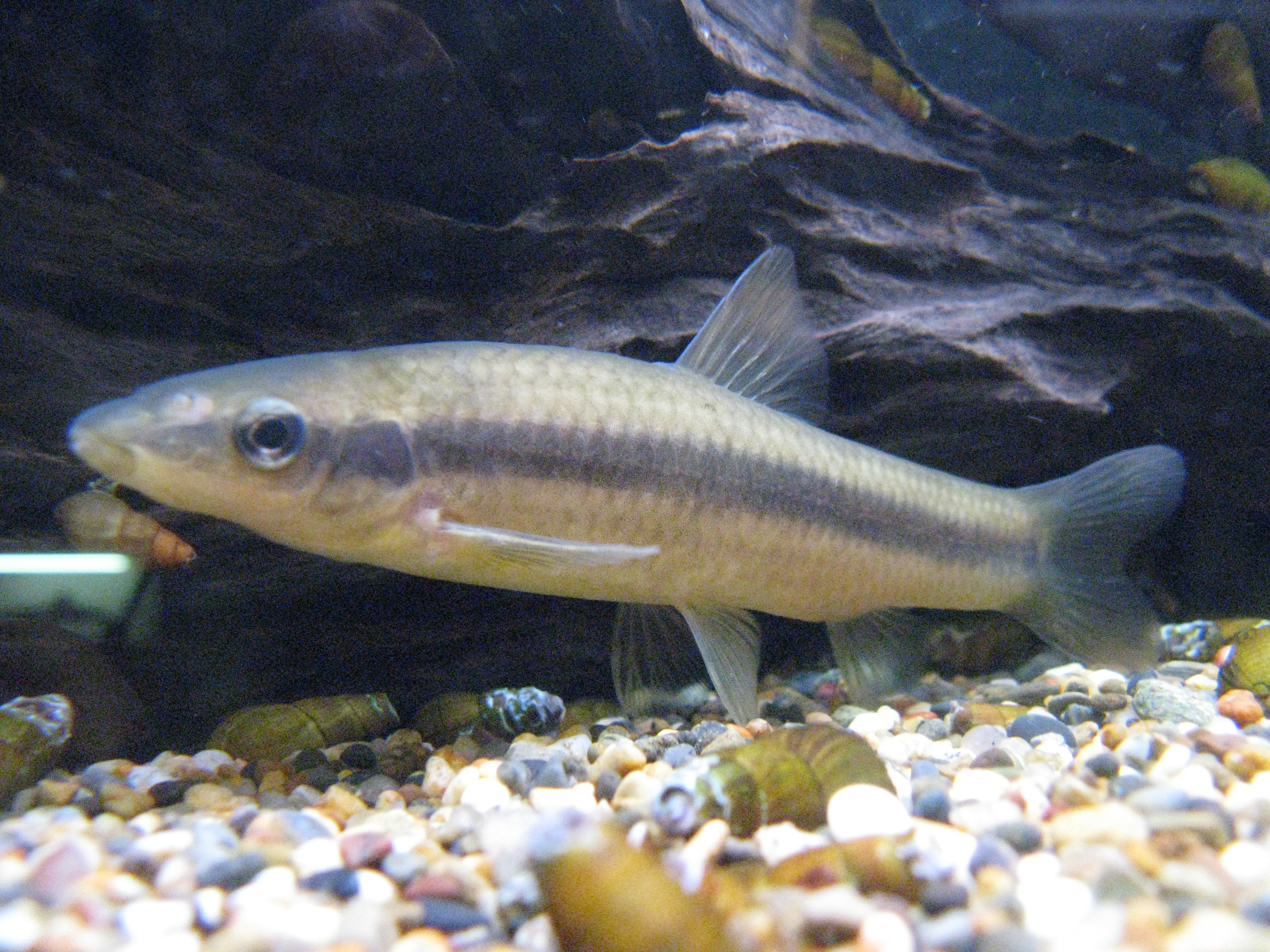

Scientific classification
- Kingdom: Animalia
- Phylum: Chordata
- Class: Actinopterygii
- Order: Cypriniformes
- Suborder: Cyprinoidei
- Family: Gobionidae
- Genus: Pungtungia
- Species: P. herzi

Binomial name
- Pungtungia herzi Herzenstein, 1892

= Pungtungia herzi =

Species of fish

Pungtungia herzi is a species of freshwater ray-finned fish belonging to the family Gobionidae, the gudgeons. This species is found in Japan and the Korean Peninsula.

Named in honor of German entomologist Alfred Otto Herz (1856–1905), who collected the type specimen.

It has been observed to deposit its eggs into nests of Siniperca kawamebari, allowing the S. kawamebari male to unwittingly guard them until they hatch, which will occur before the S. kawamebari eggs hatch and the male S. kawamebari leaves.

== See also ==
- Brood parasite
