= Aphyocypris dorsohorizontalis =

Scientific classification
- Kingdom: Animalia
- Phylum: Chordata
- Class: Actinopterygii
- Order: Cypriniformes
- Family: Xenocyprididae
- Genus: Aphyocypris
- Species: A. dorsohorizontalis

Binomial name
- Aphyocypris dorsohorizontalis (Nguyen & Doan, 1969)

Synonyms
- Nicholsicypris dorsohorizontalis Nguyen & Doan, 1969; Yaoshanicus kyphus Mai, 1978; Aphyocypris kyphus (Mai, 1978)

Species of fish

Aphyocypris dorsohorizontalis is a species of cyprinid in the genus Aphyocypris, native to Vietnam.
