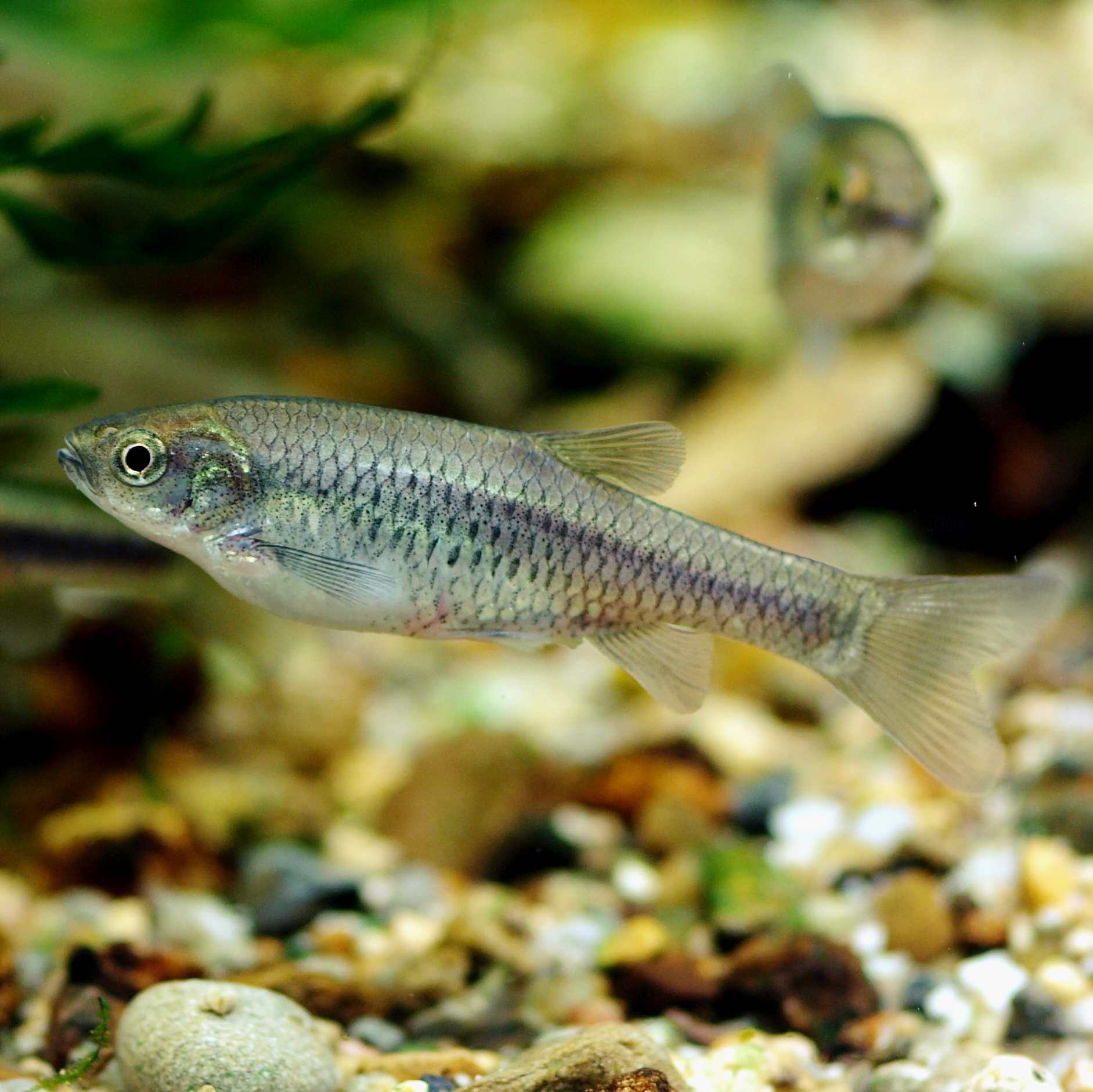

Conservation status
- Least Concern (IUCN 3.1)

Scientific classification
- Kingdom: Animalia
- Phylum: Chordata
- Class: Actinopterygii
- Order: Cypriniformes
- Family: Xenocyprididae
- Genus: Aphyocypris
- Species: A. chinensis

Binomial name
- Aphyocypris chinensis Günther, 1868

Synonyms
- Fusania ensarca D. S. Jordan & Starks 1905; Rhodeus chosenicus D. S. Jordan & Metz 1913; Caraspius agilis Nichols, 1925; Aphyocypris shantung chinensis Nichols, 1930; Aphyocyprioides typus D. S. Tang, 1942

= Aphyocypris chinensis =

Species of fish

Aphyocypris chinensis, the Chinese bleak, is a species of freshwater ray-finned fish belonging to the family Xenocyprididae, the East Asian minnows or sharpbellies. This species is found in southern Japan, the Korean Peninsula and the Pearl River drainage of China. The maximum published total length for the Chinese bleak is 6 cm (2.4 in).

The species Aphyocypris chinensis can be diagnosed by having a sub-superior mouth, with no barbel, and no knob on the anterior medium of the lower jaw fitting into a notch in the upper jaw, a keel between the base of the pelvic fin and the anus, and an incomplete lateral line or its absence.
