= Aphyocypris amnis =

Scientific classification
- Kingdom: Animalia
- Phylum: Chordata
- Class: Actinopterygii
- Order: Cypriniformes
- Family: Xenocyprididae
- Genus: Aphyocypris
- Species: A. amnis

Binomial name
- Aphyocypris amnis T. Y. Liao, S. O. Kullander & H. D. Lin, 2011

Species of fish

Aphyocypris amnis is a species of freshwater ray-finned fish belonging to the family Xenocyprididae, the East Asian minnows or sharpbellies. It is native only to a tributary of the Shuili River in Taiwan.
