= Franz Martin Hilgendorf =

German zoologist and paleontologist

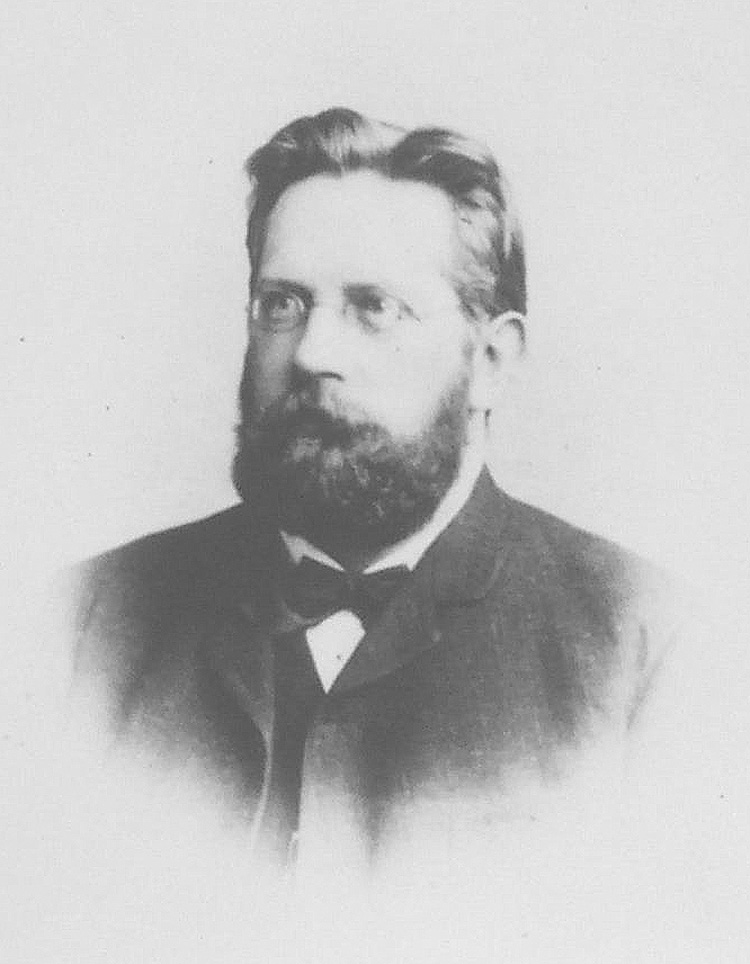
- Born: 5 December 1839; Neudamm (Mark Brandenburg), Germany (today Dębno, Poland)
- Died: 5 July 1904 (aged 64); Berlin Germany
- Known for: discovery of evolution in snails
- Scientific career
- Fields: zoologist and paleontologist

Franz Martin Hilgendorf (5 December 1839 – 5 July 1904) was a German zoologist and paleontologist. Hilgendorf's research on fossil snails from the Steinheim crater in the early 1860s became a palaeontological evidence for the theory of evolution published by Charles Darwin in 1859.

== Life and work ==
Franz Hilgendorf was born on 5 December 1839 in Neudamm (Mark Brandenburg). Between 1851 and 1854 he went to a gymnasium in Königsberg (Neumark) and later to the Gymnasium Zum Grauen Kloster (Grey Monastery) in Berlin where he graduated in 1858. In 1859 he started studying philology at the University of Berlin. After four semesters he changed to the University of Tübingen. In the summer of 1862 he joined an excavation by Friedrich August Quenstedt in the Steinheim crater. In 1863 Hilgendorf received his Ph.D. for work related to this excavation. He finished his research on the fossils during his time at the Museum für Naturkunde in Berlin.

In 1868, Hilgendorf became director of the aquarium of the Zoological Garden of Hamburg and in 1870 and 1871 he worked as librarian at the German Academy of Sciences Leopoldina. In 1873 Hilgendorf was appointed lecturer at the Imperial Medical Academy Tokyo. He stayed in Japan from 1873 till 1876 and published articles and collected several specimens of Japanese fauna. He returned to Germany with his collection and worked in the Museum für Naturkunde in Berlin. He was first responsible for the worms and snails section and from 1896, the fish section. He proposed 36 new species of Japanese fish, 25 of these are valid today.

Hilgendorf suffered from a gastric illness. He stopped working in 1903 and died from that illness on 5 July 1904.

== Taxon named in his honor ==
In 1890 Gustav Wilhelm Müller identified a new species of ostracod crustacean in the collection of Hilgendorf and named it Cypridina hilgendorfii. This name changed to Vargula hilgendorfii in 1962. Another fish named after Hilgendorf is Helicolenus hilgendorfii of Japan, described in 1884 by Ludwig Döderlein.

The fish Pungtungia hilgendorfi (Jordan & Fowler, 1903) was named in his honor.

The Tetra Alestopetersius hilgendorfi (Boulenger), 1899 is named after him.

== Evolution ==
Hilgendorf took his doctoral degree in May 1863. His thesis included information on the phylogeny of Planorbis multiformis, a gastropod. He suggested that these organisms had evolved, however, his thesis was never published. His 1866 publication which described the phylogeny of Planorbis multiformis in detail has been described as "one of the most important contributions of paleontology to early Darwinism". Darwin acknowledged the findings of Hilgendorf and referred to his research in the sixth edition of On the Origin of Species, 1872.

He was the first to construct a phylogenetic tree based on fossil evidence. Hilgendorf has been described as the first scientist to introduce Charles Darwin's evolutionary theory to Japan in 1873.

In 1877 he discovered the mollusc Pleurotomaria berichii on the coast near Tokyo and described it as a living fossil.

== Selected publications ==
- Hillgendorf, F. (1863). Beiträge zur Kenntnis des Süßwasserkalkes von Steinheim. Unpubl. Ph.-D. thesis, Philosophical Fac, Univ. of Tübingen.
- Hillgendorf, F. (1866). Planorbis multiformis im Steinheimer Süßwasserkalk. Ein Beispiel von Gestaltveränderung im Laufe der Zeit. Berlin.
- Hillgendorf, F. (1879). Zur Streitfrage des Planorbis multiformis. Kosmos 5: 10-22, 90-99.
- Hillgendorf, F. (1901): Der übergang des Planorbis multiformis trochiformis zum Planorbis multiformis oxystomus. Arch. Naturgesch 67: 331-346.

== Taxon described by him ==
- See Category:Taxa named by Franz Martin Hilgendorf
