= Spinibarbus brevicephalus =

Conservation status
- Data Deficient (IUCN 3.1)

Scientific classification
- Kingdom: Animalia
- Phylum: Chordata
- Class: Actinopterygii
- Order: Cypriniformes
- Family: Cyprinidae
- Genus: Spinibarbus
- Species: S. brevicephalus

Binomial name
- Spinibarbus brevicephalus Nguyen & Nguyen, 1997

Species of fish

Spinibarbus brevicephalus is a species of the family Cyprinidae. The fish is known to be in Vietnam.

== Status ==
As of 2010, the IUCN evaluated Spinibarbus brevicephalus and listed it as Data Deficient.
