= Pungtungia shiraii =

Scientific classification
- Kingdom: Animalia
- Phylum: Chordata
- Class: Actinopterygii
- Order: Cypriniformes
- Suborder: Cyprinoidei
- Family: Gobionidae
- Genus: Pungtungia
- Species: P. shiraii

Binomial name
- Pungtungia shiraii Ōshima, 1957

Species of fish

Pungtungia shiraii is a species of freshwater ray-finned fish belonging to the family Gobionidae, the gudgeons. This species is found in Japan.

== Etymology ==
Named in honor of Kunihiko Shirai, Bureau of Game and Hunting of the Ministry of Agriculture and Forestry, who obtained a collection of fishes downstream of the Tama River, including type of this one, and "kindly forwarded to the writer for identification".
