= Aphyocypris arcus =

Conservation status
- Least Concern (IUCN 3.1)

Scientific classification
- Kingdom: Animalia
- Phylum: Chordata
- Class: Actinopterygii
- Order: Cypriniformes
- Family: Xenocyprididae
- Genus: Aphyocypris
- Species: A. arcus

Binomial name
- Aphyocypris arcus (S. Y. Lin, 1931)

Synonyms
- Yaoshanicus arcus S. Y. Lin, 1931

Species of fish

Aphyocypris arcus, the Yaoshan carp, is a species of freshwater ray-finned fish belonging to the family Xenocyprididae, the East Asian minnows or sharpbellies. This species endemic to China where it has a disjunct distribution, being recorded from Guangdong and Guangxi, in the drainage basin of the Pearl River, and from Hainan.
