= Aphyocypris normalis =

Scientific classification
- Kingdom: Animalia
- Phylum: Chordata
- Class: Actinopterygii
- Order: Cypriniformes
- Family: Xenocyprididae
- Genus: Aphyocypris
- Species: A. normalis

Binomial name
- Aphyocypris normalis Nichols & C. H. Pope, 1927

Synonyms
- Yaoshanicus normalis (Nichols & C. H. Pope, 1927); Nicholsicypris normalis (Nichols & C. H. Pope 1927)

Species of fish

Aphyocypris normalis is a species of freshwater ray-finned fish belonging to the family Xenocyprididae, the East Asian minnows or sharpbellies. This species is found in Viet Nam and China.
