= Aphyocypris kyphus =

Scientific classification
- Kingdom: Animalia
- Phylum: Chordata
- Class: Actinopterygii
- Order: Cypriniformes
- Family: Xenocyprididae
- Genus: Aphyocypris
- Species: A. kyphus

Binomial name
- Aphyocypris kyphus (Mai, 1978)

Species of fish

Aphyocypris kyphus is a species of cyprinid in the genus Aphyocypris that inhabits Vietnam.
