= Aphyocypris pulchrilineata =

Conservation status
- Near Threatened (IUCN 3.1)

Scientific classification
- Kingdom: Animalia
- Phylum: Chordata
- Class: Actinopterygii
- Order: Cypriniformes
- Family: Xenocyprididae
- Genus: Aphyocypris
- Species: A. pulchrilineata

Binomial name
- Aphyocypris pulchrilineata Y. Zhu, Y. H. Zhao & K. Huang, 2013

Species of fish

Aphyocypris pulchrilineata is a species of freshwater ray-finned fish belonging to the family Xenocyprididae, the East Asian minnows or sharpbellies. This species was originally described from a stream of the Chengjiang River at Chengjiang in Du'an County in Guangxi, China. The Chengjiang River is a small northern branch of the Hongshuihe River, a tributary of the Xijiang in the Pearl River system. It has since been found in the Zuojiang and Youjiang rivers, also in Guangxi.
