= Pungtungia hilgendorfi =

Scientific classification
- Kingdom: Animalia
- Phylum: Chordata
- Class: Actinopterygii
- Order: Cypriniformes
- Suborder: Cyprinoidei
- Family: Gobionidae
- Genus: Pungtungia
- Species: P. hilgendorfi

Binomial name
- Pungtungia hilgendorfi (D. S. Jordan & Fowler, 1903)

Synonyms
- Zezera hilgendorfi D. S. Jordan & Fowler, 1903

Species of fish

Pungtungia hilgendorfi is a species of freshwater ray-finned fish belonging to the family Gobionidae, the gudgeons. This species is found in Japan.

Named in honor of German zoologist and paleontologist Franz Hilgendorf (1839-1904), lecturer at the Imperial Medical Academy Tokyo (1873-1876), whereupon he published articles and collected several specimens of Japanese fauna.
