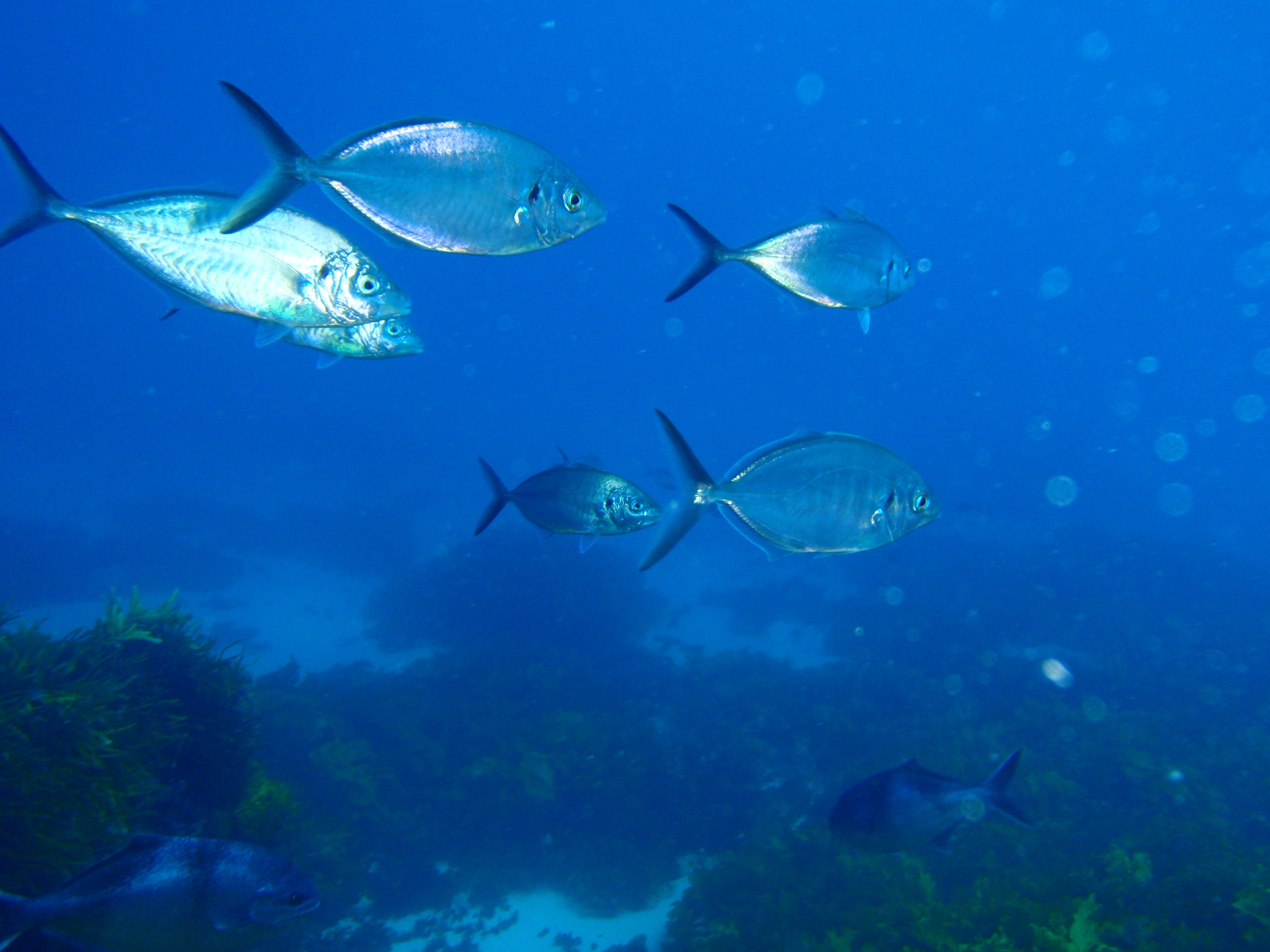

Conservation status
- Least Concern (IUCN 3.1)

Scientific classification
- Kingdom: Animalia
- Phylum: Chordata
- Class: Actinopterygii
- Division: Teleostei
- Order: Carangiformes
- Suborder: Carangoidei
- Family: Carangidae
- Genus: Pseudocaranx
- Species: P. wrighti

Binomial name
- Pseudocaranx wrighti (Whitley, 1931)

Synonyms
- Usacaranx georgianus wrighti Whitley, 1931; Caranx wrighti (Whitley, 1931)

= Skipjack trevally =

Species of fish

The skipjack trevally (Pseudocaranx wrighti) or sand trevally is a species of ray-finned fish in the family Carangidae, the jacks, trevallies, pompanos, and scads. It is found in the eastern Indian Ocean around Australia.

== Description ==
The skipjack trevally is steely blue in colour with an obvious, sharply demarcated, all-black spot with on the upper margin of the operculum, which has roughly the same diameter as the pupil. The dorsal and anal fins are dusky green in colour and lack any yellow colouration. The body is not marked with any other markings. The juveniles are marked with thin, grey bands along their flanks. It is the smallest member of the genus Pseudocaranx, which rarely grows longer than a fork length of 20 cm (7.9 in).

== Distribution ==
The skipjack trevally is endemic to Australia, where it occurs from southern New South Wales and the Bass Strait between Victoria and Tasmania to the waters around Rottnest Island in Western Australia. Also, a specimen was recorded from as far north as the Exmouth Gulf, which may represent an instance of vagrancy,

== Habitat and biology ==
The skipjack trevally is a coastal species; the adults are found over sandy substrates and seagrass and often enter estuaries. The juveniles occur in large schools and are often caught in considerable numbers by fisheries targeting prawns. This is a relatively short-lived species, where the average age is five years.

== Taxonomy and etymology ==
The skipjack trevally was described in 1931 as Usacaranx georgianus wrighti by Gilbert Percy Whitley with the type locality given as "40 miles west of Kingston, South Australia, depth 30 fathoms". The specific name honours J.H. Wright, who may be the same J.H. Wright who was a taxidermist at the Australian Museum in 1908-1916.
