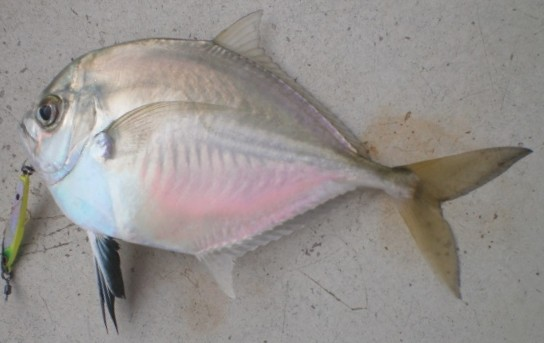
- Atropus atropos

Scientific classification
- Kingdom: Animalia
- Phylum: Chordata
- Class: Actinopterygii
- Order: Carangiformes
- Suborder: Carangoidei
- Family: Carangidae
- Subfamily: Caranginae
- Genus: Atropus; Oken (ex Cuvier), 1817

Type species
- Brama atropos Bloch & Schneider, 1801

Synonyms
- Leioglossus Bleeker, 1851; Olistus Cuvier, 1829; Ulua Jordan & Snyder, 1908

= Atropus =

Genus of ray-finned fishes

Atropus is a genus of trevallies, native to the Indo West Pacific.

== Species ==
There are currently five recognized species in this genus:

| Image | Scientific name | Common name | Distribution |
|---|---|---|---|
| | Atropus armatus (Rüppell, 1830) | Longfin trevally | the Indo-Pacific, ranging from South Africa in the west to Japan in the east |
| | Atropus atropos (Bloch & Schneider, 1801) | Cleftbelly trevally | the Indo-Pacific, ranging from South Africa in the west to Japan in the east |
| | Atropus aurochs (J. D. Ogilby, 1915) | Silvermouth trevally | the Indo-Pacific in the western and central Pacific Ocean from New Guinea, northern Australia, the Philippines, and Pacific islands |
| | Atropus hedlandensis (Whitley, 1934) | Bumpnose trevally | the Indo-west Pacific region, ranging from South Africa in the west to Japan and Samoa in the east |
| | Atropus mentalis (G. Cuvier, 1833) | Longrakered trevally | Indian and west Pacific Oceans, from Mozambique and Madagascar in the west, to Japan and northern Australia in the east |
