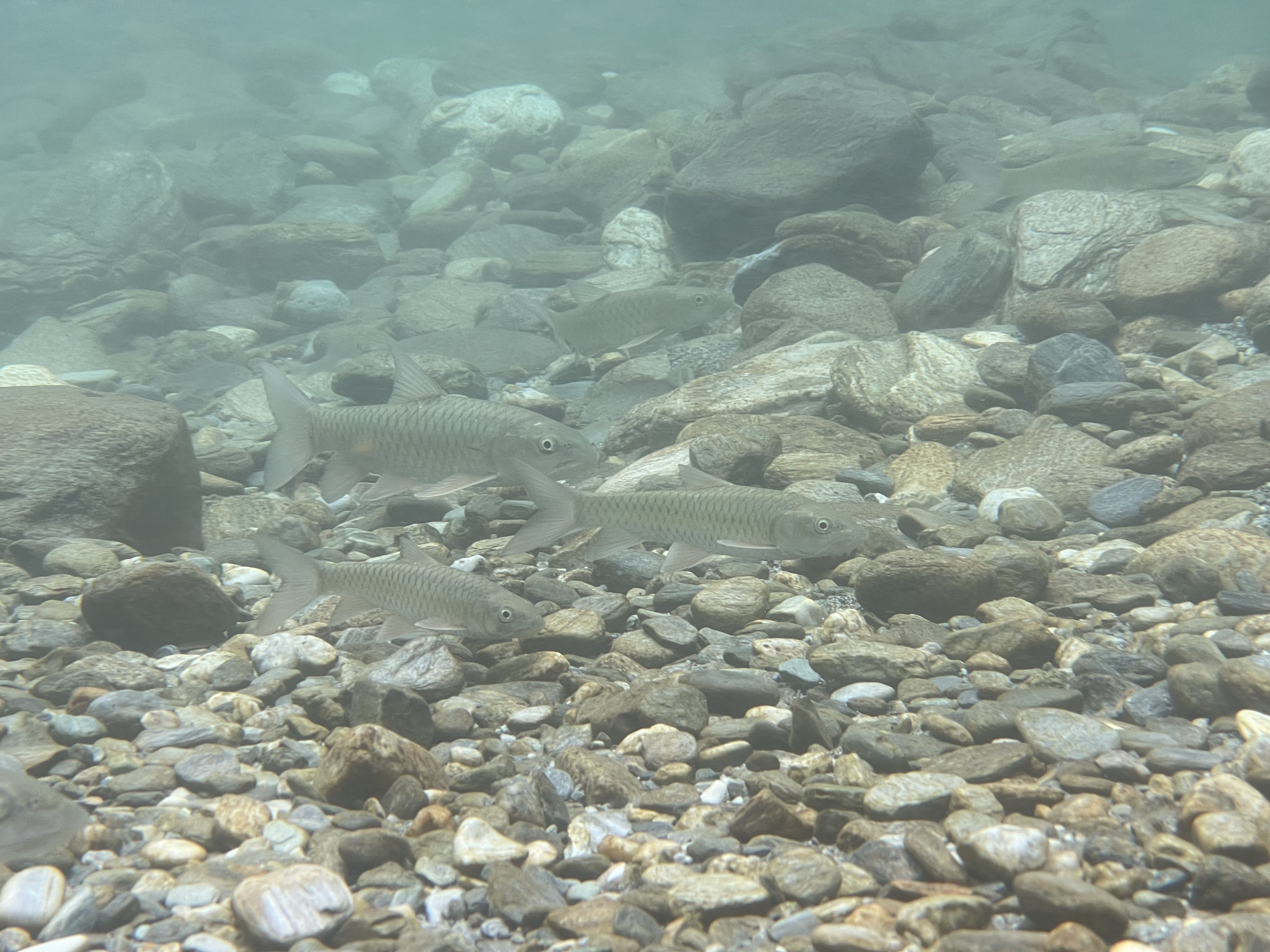

Conservation status
- Data Deficient (IUCN 3.1)

Scientific classification
- Kingdom: Animalia
- Phylum: Chordata
- Class: Actinopterygii
- Order: Cypriniformes
- Family: Cyprinidae
- Genus: Spinibarbus
- Species: S. hollandi

Binomial name
- Spinibarbus hollandi Ōshima, 1919

Synonyms
- Spinibarbus elongatus Ōshima, 1919; Barbodes elongatus (Ōshima, 1919)

= Spinibarbus hollandi =

Species of fish

Spinibarbus hollandi is a species of cyprinid fish endemic to Taiwan. It grows to 60 cm (24 in) length.

Named in honor of zoologist-paleontologist William J. Holland (1848-1932), Director of the Carnegie Museums of Pittsburgh, in whose journal Oshima's paper appeared.
