= Cẩm Thủy =

- Commune
- Interactive map of Cẩm Thủy
- Coordinates: 20.215076122815326°N 105.47737615706411°E
- Country: Vietnam
- Region: North Central Coast
- Province: Thanh Hóa
- Established: 16 June 2025
- Administrative headquarters: Thống Nhất Street, Đại An Hamlet

Area
  - Total: 64.42 km^{2} (24.87 sq mi)

Population (2024)
  - Total: 30,525
  - Density: 473/km^{2} (1,230/sq mi)
- Postal code: 41326
- Website: camthuy.thanhhoa.gov.vn

Cẩm Thủy is a commune in Thanh Hóa province, Vietnam. The commune inherited its name from the former Cẩm Thủy district.

From 16 June 2025, under Resolution No. 1686/NQ-UBTVQH15, Cẩm Thủy district was dissolved and the new Cẩm Thủy Commune was established through the merger of the entire area and population of Phong Sơn township and Cẩm Ngọc commune.
