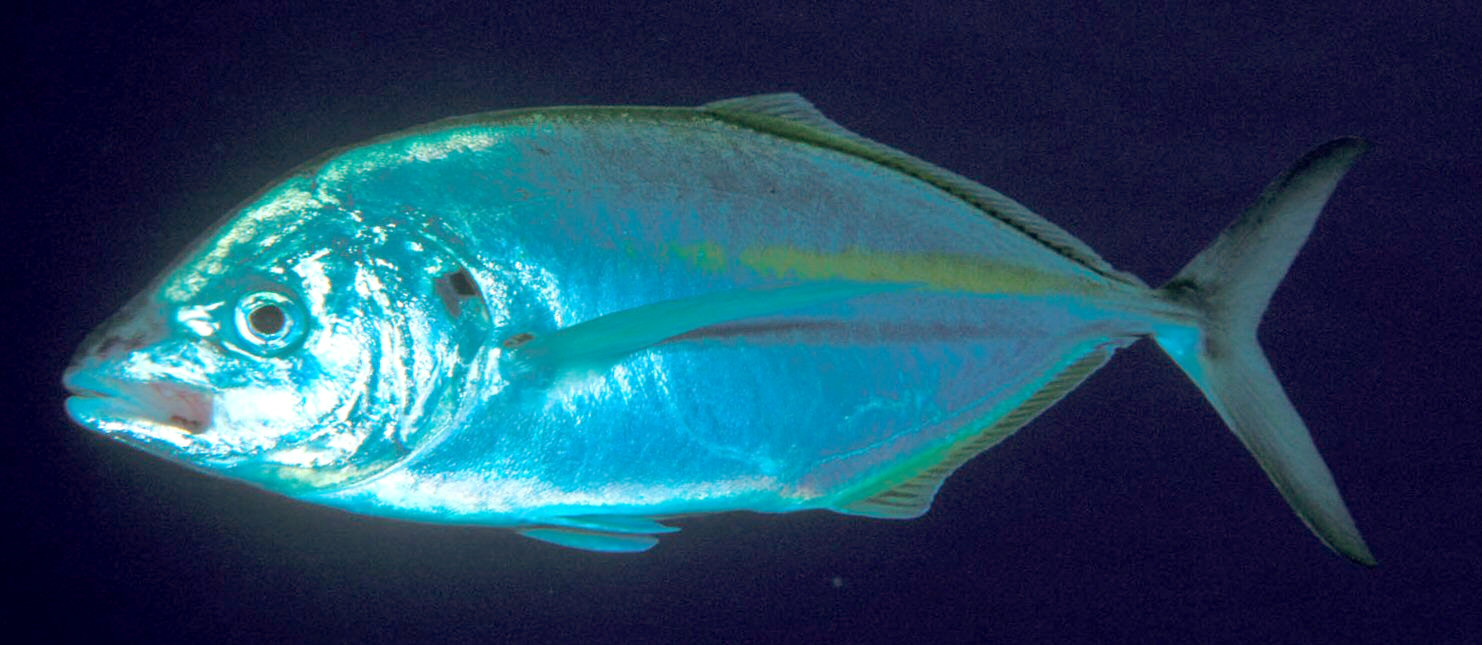

Conservation status
- Least Concern (IUCN 3.1)

Scientific classification
- Kingdom: Animalia
- Phylum: Chordata
- Class: Actinopterygii
- Order: Carangiformes
- Suborder: Carangoidei
- Family: Carangidae
- Genus: Pseudocaranx
- Species: P. dentex

Binomial name
- Pseudocaranx dentex (Bloch & J. G. Schneider, 1801)

Synonyms
- Pseudocaranx dentex (Bloch & Schneider, 1801); Scomber dentex Bloch & Schneider, 1801; Caranx dentex (Bloch & Schneider, 1801); Caranx adscensionis (Osbeck, 1771); Trachurus imperialis Rafinesque, 1810; Caranx luna Geoffroy Saint-Hilaire, 1817; Citula banksii Risso, 1820; Caranx solea Cuvier, 1833; Caranx analis Cuvier, 1833; Caranx georgianus Cuvier, 1833; Usacaranx georgianus (Cuvier, 1833); Caranx platessa Cuvier, 1833; Longirostrum platessa (Cuvier, 1833); Caranx lutescens (Richardson & Solander, 1843); Scomber lutescens Solander, 1843; Usacaranx lutescens (Solander, 1843); Scomber micans Solander, 1843; Scomber platinoides Solander, 1843; Caranx cestus Richardson, 1846; Caranx nobilis Macleay, 1881; Usacaranx nobilis (Macleay, 1881); Caranx delicatissimus Döderlein, 1884; Longirostrum delicatissimus (Döderlein, 1884); Carangus cheilio Snyder, 1904; Caranx cheilio (Snyder, 1904); Pseudocaranx cheilio (Snyder, 1904); Caranx natalensis Gilchrist & Thompson, 1911; Usacaranx archeyi Griffin, 1932

= White trevally =

Species of fish

The white trevally (Pseudocaranx dentex), also known as striped jack,) is a jack of the family Carangidae widespread in tropical and warm temperate areas between 40°N and 47°S, in the Atlantic, Mediterranean, Indian, and Pacific Oceans. It has a deep body and a greenish colour with metallic overtones and a dark spot above the gills. The fins are yellow. Trevally are strong fighters and the flesh is good to eat if a little dry. It is often used as cut bait. Its maximum size is about 120 cm (47 in).

In New Zealand, this trevally is known by the Māori as araara, and is generally confined to waters north of Cook Strait, although it sometimes reaches as far south as Otago in the summer.

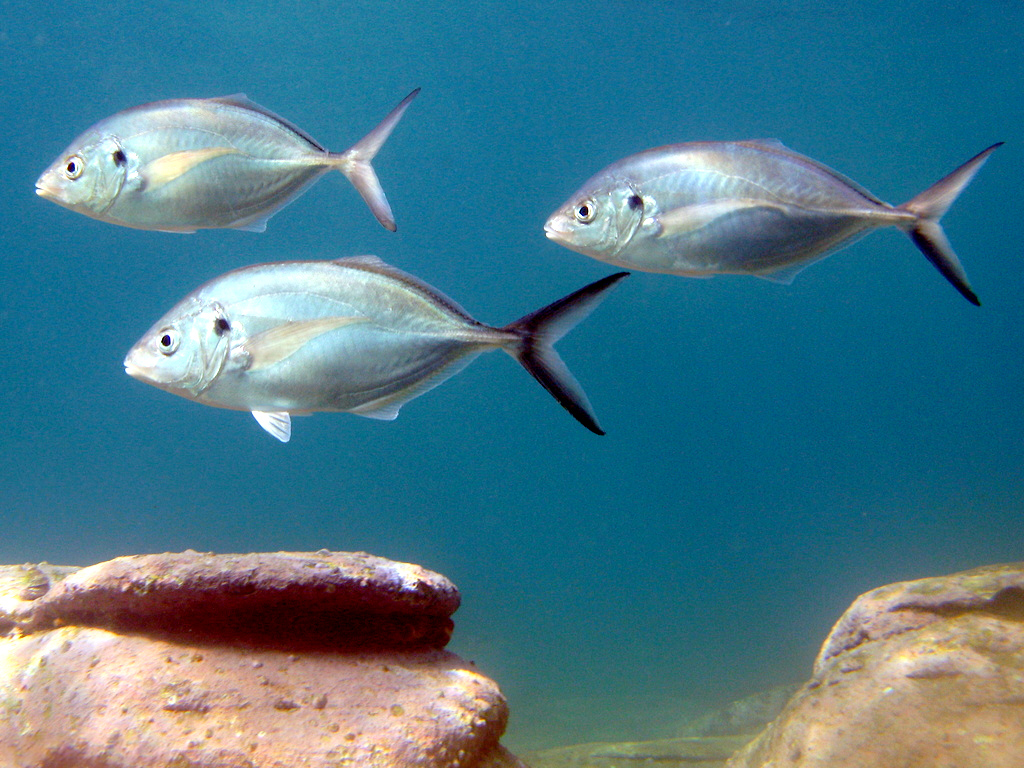
Juvenile Pseudocaranx dentex

== Relationship with humans ==
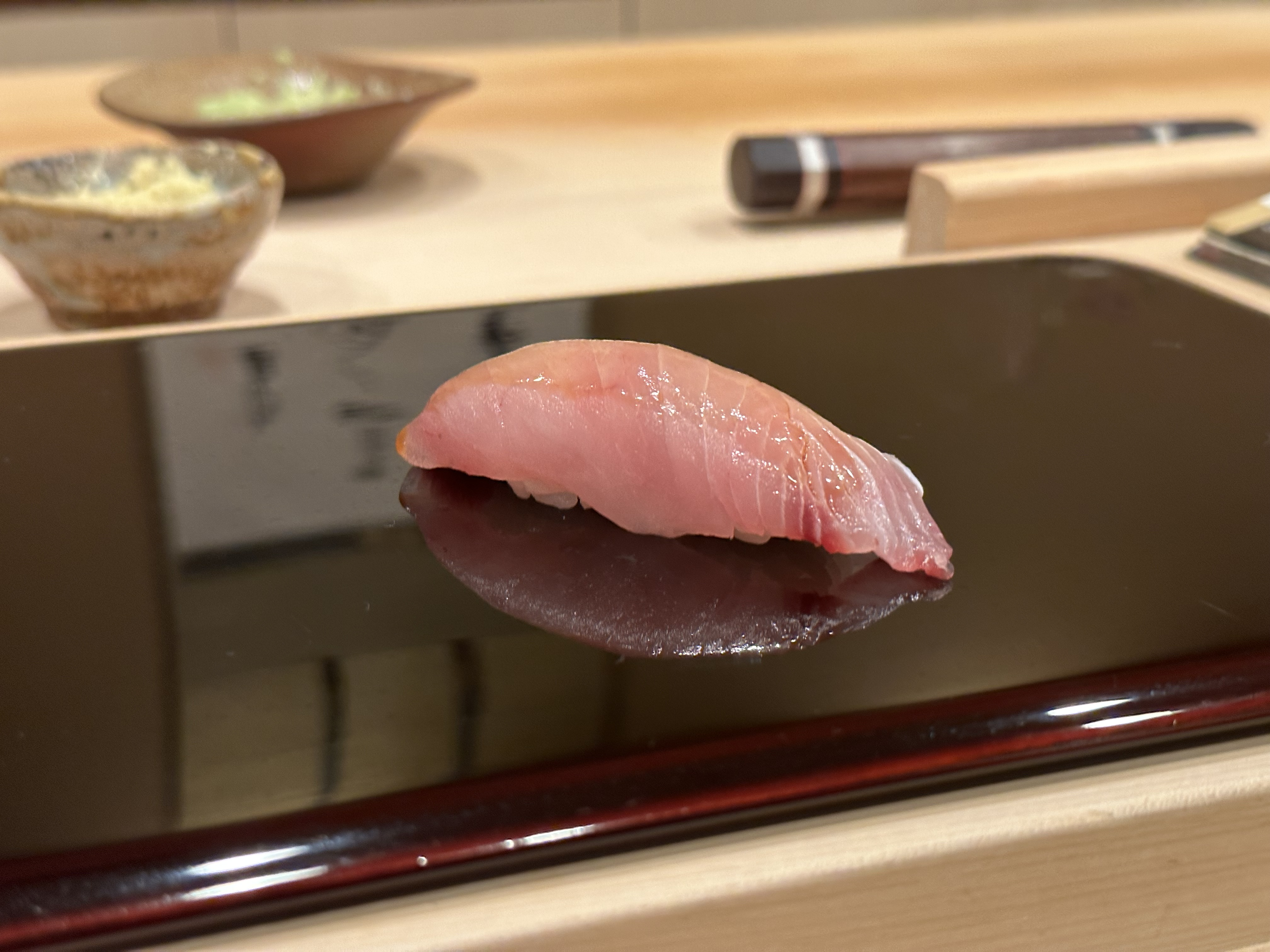
As sushi

The IGFA all-tackle world record for the species sits at 15.25 kg (33 lb 10 oz) caught near Tokyo, Japan in 1998.
