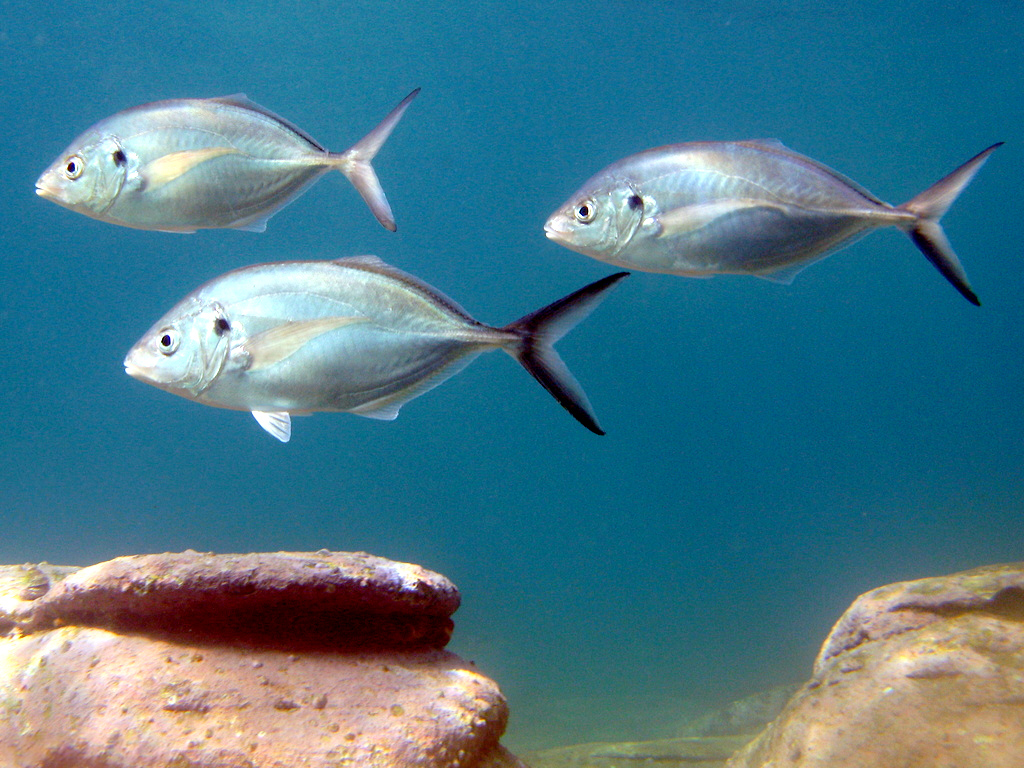
- White Trevally (juveniles) (P. dentex)

Scientific classification
- Kingdom: Animalia
- Phylum: Chordata
- Class: Actinopterygii
- Order: Carangiformes
- Suborder: Carangoidei
- Family: Carangidae
- Subfamily: Caranginae
- Genus: Pseudocaranx; Bleeker, 1863

Type species
- Scomber dentex Bloch & J. G. Schneider, 1801

Synonyms
- Citula Cuvier, 1816; Longirostrum Wakiya, 1924; Usa Whitley, 1927; Usacaranx Whitley, 1931

= Pseudocaranx =

Genus of ray-finned fishes

Pseudocaranx is a genus of ray-finned fishes from the family Carangidae, the jacks, trevallies, scads, and pompanos. They occur in the western Atlantic Ocean and the Indo-Pacific.

== Species ==
Six recognized species are placed in this genus:

- Pseudocaranx cheilio (Snyder, 1904)
- Pseudocaranx chilensis (Guichenot, 1848) (Juan Fernandez trevally)
- Pseudocaranx dentex (Bloch & J. G. Schneider, 1801) (white trevally)
- Pseudocaranx dinjerra Smith-Vaniz & Jelks, 2006
- Pseudocaranx georgianus (Cuvier, 1833)
- Pseudocaranx wrighti (Whitley, 1931) (skipjack trevally)

Fishbase does not treat P. georgianus or P. cheilio as valid species, treating them as junior synonyms of P. dentex, but notes that many other authorities treat them as valid species. Catalog of Fishes and the IUCN Red List of Threatened Species treat them both as a valid species.
