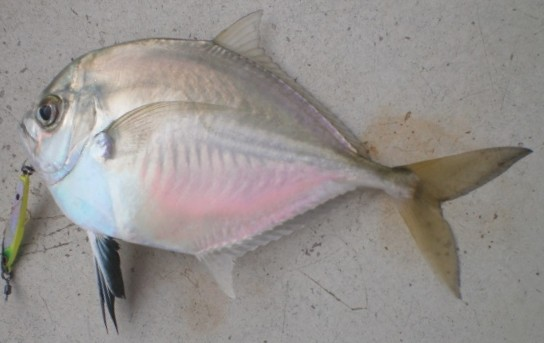

Conservation status
- Least Concern (IUCN 3.1)

Scientific classification
- Kingdom: Animalia
- Phylum: Chordata
- Class: Actinopterygii
- Order: Carangiformes
- Suborder: Carangoidei
- Family: Carangidae
- Subfamily: Caranginae
- Genus: Atropus; Oken, 1817
- Species: A. atropos

Binomial name
- Atropus atropos (Bloch & Schneider, 1801)
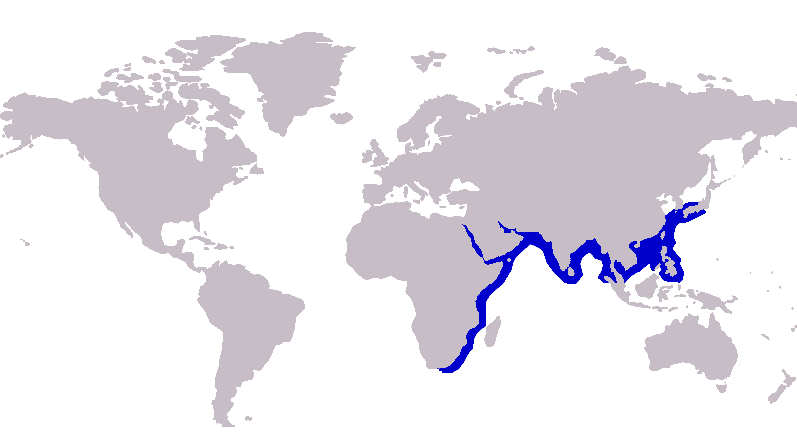
- Approximate range of the cleftbelly trevally

Synonyms
- Brama atropos, Bloch & Schneider, 1801; Caranx atropus, (Bloch & Schneider, 1801); Atropus atropus (misspelling)

= Cleftbelly trevally =

Species of fish

The cleftbelly trevally (Atropus atropos), also known as the cleftbelly kingfish, Kuweh trevally or thin crevalle, is a species of tropical marine fish of the jack family, Carangidae. The species inhabits coastal waters throughout the Indo-West Pacific region from South Africa in the west to Japan in the east, often found near the water's surface. The cleftbelly trevally is distinguished by a number of anatomical characteristics, with a deep median groove in the belly giving the species its common name. It is not a large fish, growing to a maximum recorded length of 26.5 cm (10.4 in). Cleftbelly trevally are predatory fish, taking a variety of small crustaceans and fish. The species is of minor importance to fisheries throughout its range.

== Taxonomy and naming ==
The cleftbelly trevally was formerly the only species in the genus Atropus, which is one of 31 genera in the jack family, Carangidae. The Carangidae are part of the order Carangiformes.

The species was first scientifically described under the name of Brama atropos by German ichthyologists Marcus Elieser Bloch and Johann Gottlob Schneider in the massive 1801 volume of Systema Ichthyologiae iconibus cx illustratum, a document which is the taxonomic authority for many species. Bloch and Schneider placed the species in the genus Brama, within the pomfret family. The generic position of the species was revised twice, once being placed in the jack genus, Caranx, and finally into Atropus. The genus Atropus had been informally created by Georges Cuvier in 1817 as "Les Atropus", and was formally Latinized by Lorenz Oken, thus making him the author of the genus. A. atropos is the type species of the genus by monotypy. The type specimen was taken from the waters of Puducherry, in India.

The fact that the generic and specific names differ by a single letter has also led to the misspelling of the species as Atropus atropus in some publications. The species is most commonly referred to in English as the cleftbelly trevally, with other names including cleftbelly kingfish, Kuweh trevally and thin crevalle. It is also occasionally called the 'blackfin jack', but should not be confused with Hemicaranx zelotes, also known by that name.

== Description ==
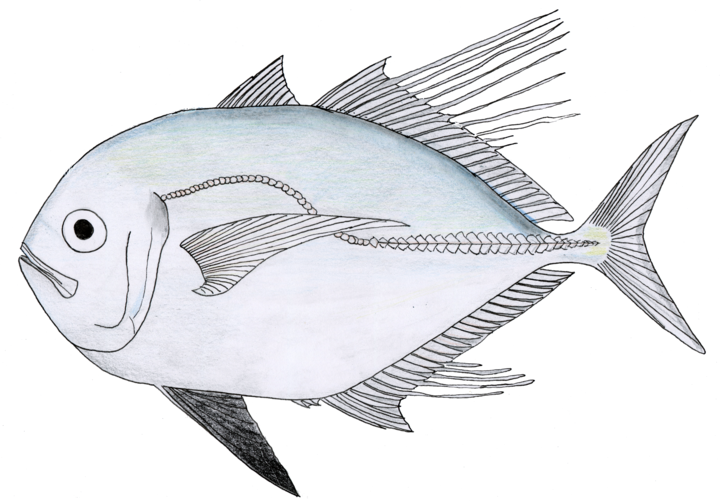
Male cleftbelly trevally

The cleftbelly trevally has a body shape similar in many ways to a number of the larger jacks, with a strongly compressed body almost ovate in shape. The dorsal profile of the head is straight and steep from the tip of the upper jaw to above the eye where the profile becomes convex. The eye lacks an adipose eyelid, and the upper jaw has a narrow band of small teeth, while the lower jaw has two or three rows of small teeth which narrow to one row on the sides of the jaw. The ventral profile is concave upwards, with a major distinguishing feature of the species being a deep median groove along the belly, into which the large pelvic fins fold, also encompassing the first two anal fin spines and anus. The entire chest from underneath the pectoral fins to the base of the pelvic fins is scaleless. There are two separate dorsal fins, the first with eight spines and the second with a single spine followed by 19 to 22 soft rays. The anal fin has two detached spines before the major part of the anal fin, which consists of one spine and 17 or 18 soft rays. The pectoral and pelvic fins are both quite long, with the latter extending almost to the anal fin origin. The lateral line has a moderately strong arch anteriorally which intersects the straight section underneath the fifth to seventh dorsal rays. The straight part of the lateral line has 31–37 scutes.

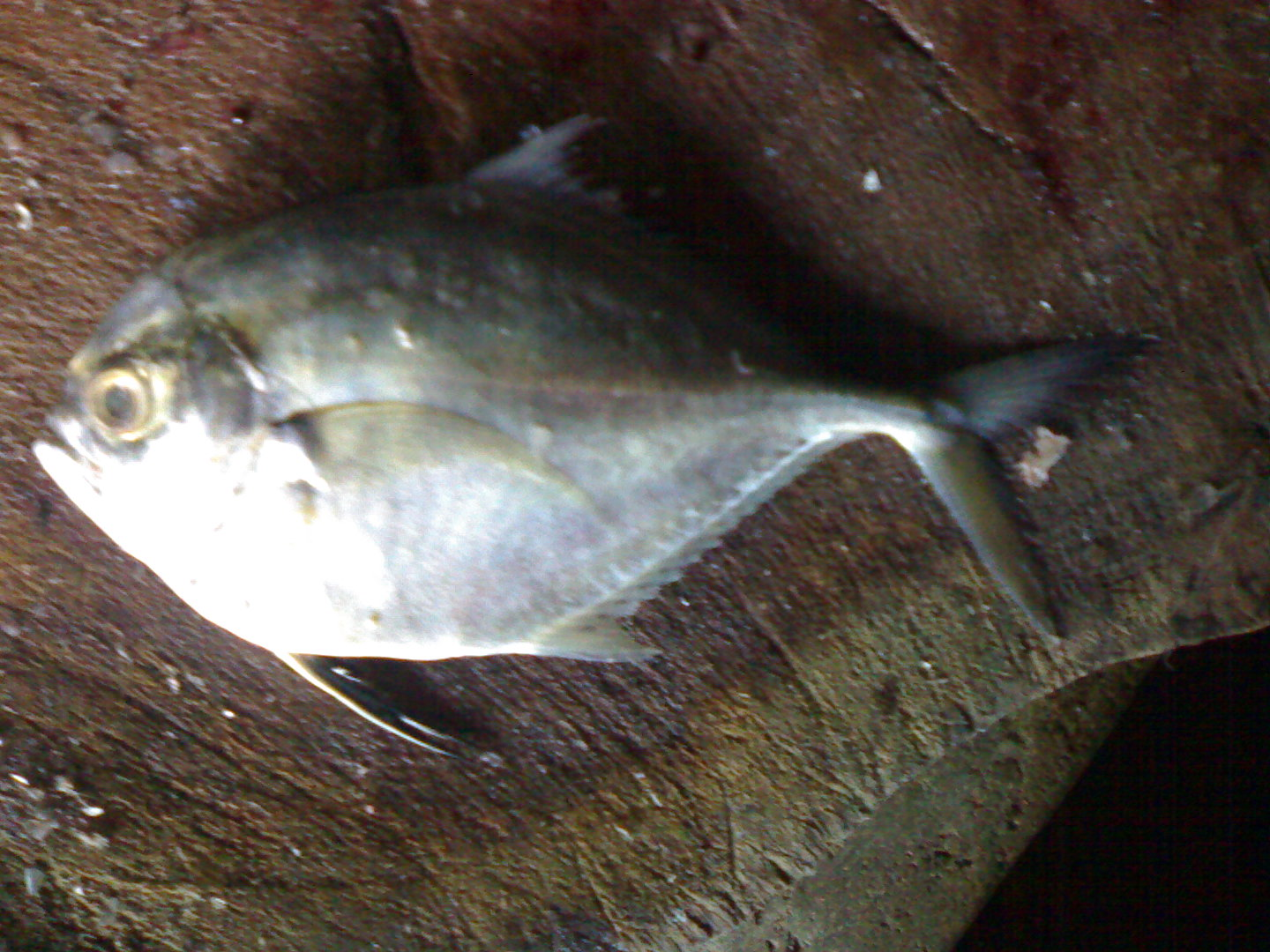
A cleftbelly trevally at an Indian market

There are 24 vertebrae and 29 to 34 total gill rakers. The species is known to reach 26.5 cm (10.4 in) in length, although often encountered below 20 cm (7.9 in).

The cleftbelly trevally is a bluish green on the upper body which fades to silver on the underside of the fish. The membranes of the large pelvic fin are a distinctive black, while the remaining fins are a pale white colour. Juveniles have indistinct dark bands across their bodies, with a black spot becoming more prominent in adults.

The species show sexual dimorphism in their dorsal fins, with mature males having between 6 and 12 elongated soft rays, strung out into filaments of varying lengths. The anal fin is also has five similar extensions of the soft rays. Females do not show this elongation.

== Distribution and habitat ==
The cleftbelly trevally inhabits the tropical and subtropical waters of the Indo-West Pacific region. Its range extends from South Africa along the east African coast including the Persian Gulf, east to India, Southeast Asia, the Philippines, Taiwan and southern Japan. Some sources state the Persian Gulf as the westernmost point of the species range, but specimens sent to Henry Fowler from South and eastern Africa in the 1930s show this to be incorrect.

The species inhabit shallow coastal waters, where they swim close to the surface. There has been a report of the species living in areas near estuaries which empty large flows of fresh water into these areas, indicating the species may be able to live in estuarine environments.

== Biology and fishery ==
The cleftbelly trevally is a predatory species, preying on small crustaceans including shrimps, copepods and decapods, as well as small fish. Reproduction in the species has not been extensively studied, although early growth has been described in a 1984 article. The study was located in India, and showed the fish grows 12.4 cm (4.9 in) in its first year of life, growing slower in its second and third years, adding 7.35 cm (2.89 in) and 3.5 cm (1.4 in) to its total length, respectively, in these years. The species reaches sexual maturity at 21 cm (8.3 in), in the second or third year of its life.

The species is of minor importance to fisheries throughout its range, taken mainly by trawls, traps and by various hook-and-line methods.
