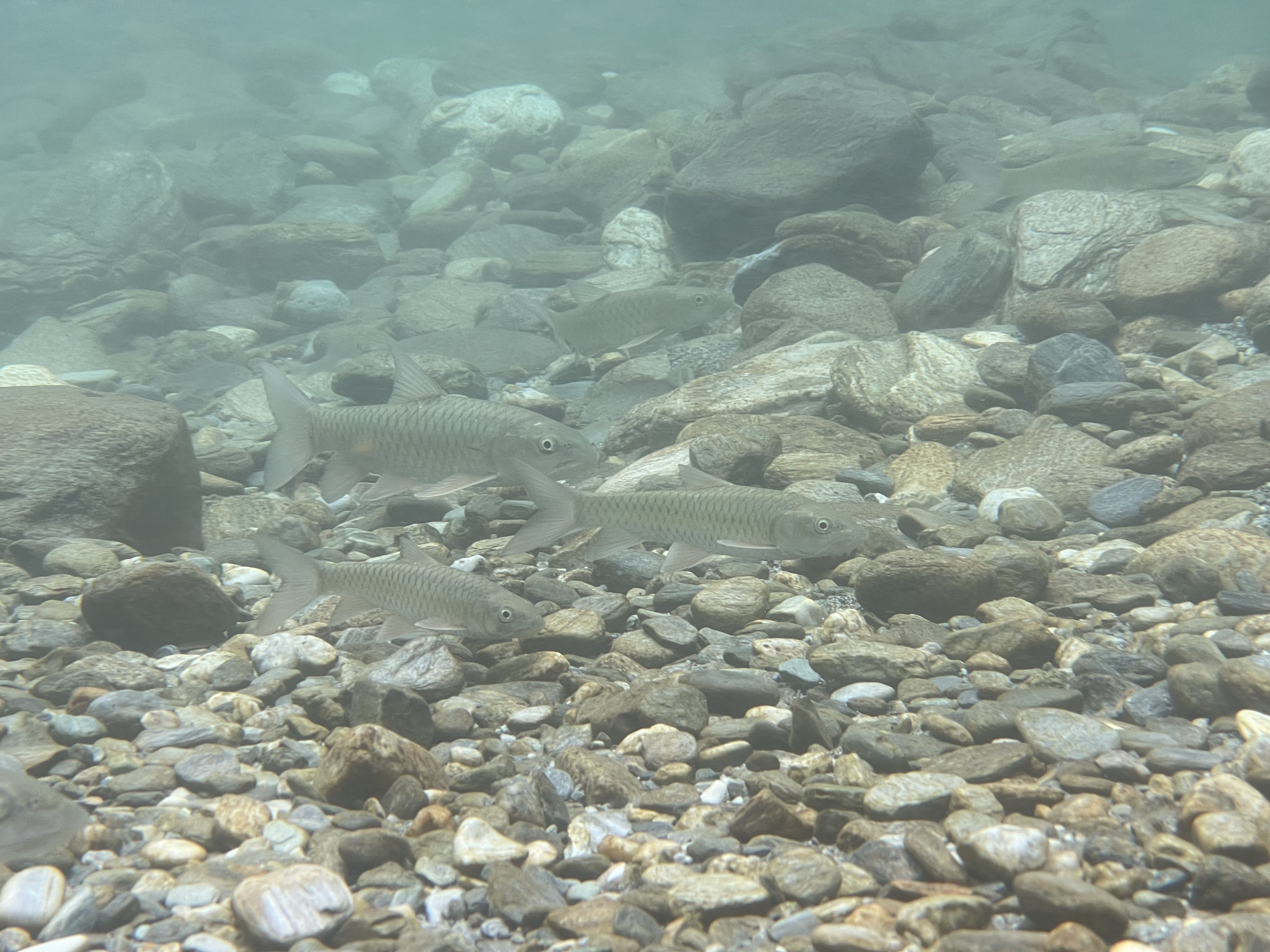
- Holland's carp (Spinibarbus hollandi), the type species of Spinibarbus.

Scientific classification
- Kingdom: Animalia
- Phylum: Chordata
- Class: Actinopterygii
- Order: Cypriniformes
- Family: Cyprinidae
- Subfamily: Spinibarbinae; Yang et al, 2015

= Spinibarbinae =

Subfamily of the carp family (Cyprinidae)

Spinibarbinae is a subfamily of freshwater ray-finned fishes belonging to the family Cyprinidae, which includes the carps, barbs and related fishes. The fishes in this subfamily are found in Asia.

== Genera ==
Spinibarbinae contains the following genera:

- Spinibarbichthys Ōshima, 1926
- Spinibarbus Ōshima, 1919
