= Yonetarō Kikuchi =

Japanese zoologist

Yonetaro Kikuchi
- 菊池 米太郎
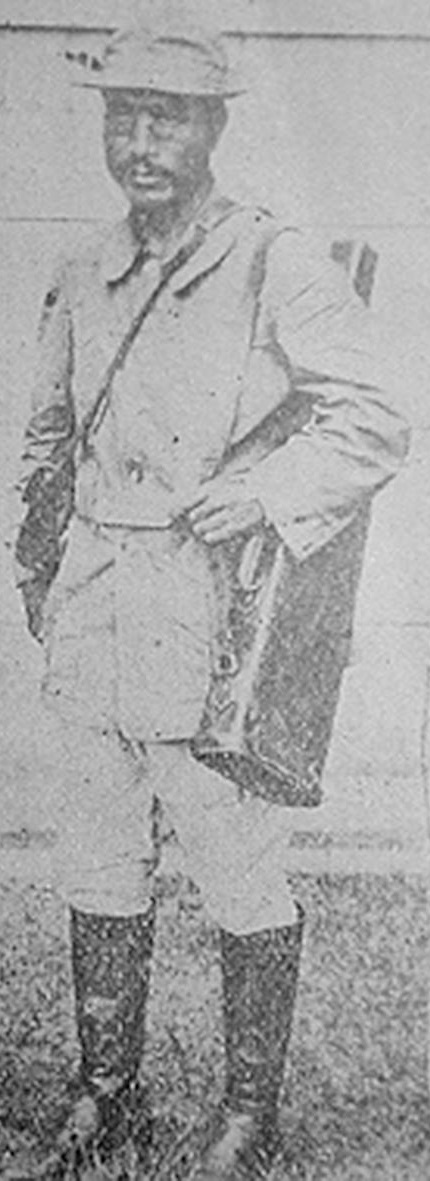
- Born: 1869; Miyazaki Prefecture, Empire of Japan
- Died: 1921 (aged 51–52); Japanese Taiwan
- Known for: Collection of Taiwanese fauna; first capture of the Mikado pheasant
- Scientific career
- Fields: Ornithology, Herpetology, Natural history
- Workplaces: Taiwan Government-General

Yonetaro Kikuchi (菊池 米太郎; 1869 – 1921) was a Japanese zoologist and naturalist. He was born in Miyazaki Prefecture, Empire of Japan, and is best known for his extensive collection and study of birds, mammals, and reptiles in Taiwan during the Japanese colonial period.

== Biography ==
In 1906, Kikuchi traveled to Taiwan to work for the Taiwan Government-General under the Bureau of Productive Industries. Over the following decade, he conducted extensive fieldwork across the island, including Mount Niitaka (now Yushan), Green Island, the Alishan Range, Orchid Island, and the Penghu archipelago. His collections of Taiwanese birds, mammals, and reptiles were large in scale and scientifically significant.

Kikuchi is particularly known for being the first person to successfully capture the Mikado pheasant (Syrmaticus mikado) in 1906, after being commissioned by a British specimen dealer. In 1918, by order of Governor-General Akashi Motojirō, Kikuchi again captured Mikado pheasants and personally presented them to Emperor Taishō, accompanied by the Governor-General. The birds were subsequently kept in the Shinjuku Gyoen National Garden.

In addition to his field expertise, Kikuchi was a highly skilled taxidermist. A large proportion of the zoological specimens currently held by the National Taiwan Museum were prepared by him.

Kikuchi died of illness in Taiwan in 1921 at the age of 52.

== Legacy ==
Several animal species have been named in honor of Kikuchi, including:

- Kikuchi's vole (Microtus kikuchii)
- Kikuchi's pit viper (Trimeresurus gracilis; also known in Taiwan as the Taiwan bamboo viper)
- Kikuchi's minnow
