= Masamitsu Ōshima =

Japanese herpetologist and ichthyologist

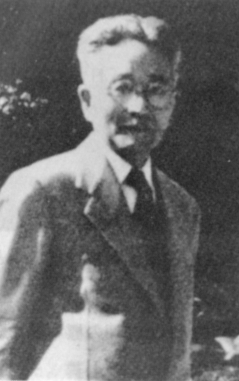
- Ōshima in 1920
- Born: June 21, 1884
- Died: June 26, 1965 (aged 81)
- Education: Stanford University
- Scientific career
- Fields: Herpetology; Ichthyology

Masamitsu Ōshima (大島 正満, Ōshima Masamitsu; June 21, 1884 – June 26, 1965) was a Japanese herpetologist and ichthyologist. He received his Master's from Stanford University. He is noted for studies of the fish species of Taiwan and on snakes.

== Taxon described by him ==
- See Category:Taxa named by Masamitsu Ōshima
- Squalidus iijimae Named in honor of zoologist Isao lijima.
- Pungtungia shiraii Named in honor of Kunihiko Shirai.
- Aphyocypris kikuchii Named in honor of Yonetaro Kikuchi (1869–1921), collector for the Taipei Museum in Formosa (Taiwan), who collected the type specimen.
- Barbodes snyderi Snyder's barb.
- Oncorhynchus masou formosanus
- Spinibarbus hollandi Named in honor of zoologist-paleontologist William J. Holland.

== Partial bibliography ==
- A Review of the Fishes of the Family Mugilidæ Found in the Waters of Formosa
- A Review of the Fishes of the Family Centriscidæ Found in the Waters of Formosa
- Notes on the Venomous Snakes from the Islands of Formosa and Riu Kiu
- A cyclopedia of applied zoology
- 魚 (Fishes, in Japanese), Tokyo 1940
