= Acrossocheilus lamus =

Conservation status
- Data Deficient (IUCN 3.1)

Scientific classification
- Kingdom: Animalia
- Phylum: Chordata
- Class: Actinopterygii
- Order: Cypriniformes
- Family: Cyprinidae
- Subfamily: Acrossocheilinae
- Genus: Acrossocheilus
- Species: A. lamus

Binomial name
- Acrossocheilus lamus (Đ. Y. Mai, 1978)

Synonyms
- Lissochilus lamus Mai, 1978

Species of fish

Acrossocheilus lamus is a species of ray-finned fish in the family Cyprinidae. It is endemic to Vietnam and only known from the Cả River (=Lam River).
