= Masticbarbus =

Scientific classification
- Kingdom: Animalia
- Phylum: Chordata
- Class: Actinopterygii
- Order: Cypriniformes
- Family: Cyprinidae
- Subfamily: Acrossocheilinae
- Genus: Masticbarbus; Tang, 1942

Type species
- Masticbarbus pentafasciatus Tang, 1942

Species
- See text.

Genus of fishes

Masticbarbus is a genus of ray-finned fish in the family Cyprinidae (carps, minnows and allies), native to Vietnam and southern China.

== Species ==
Masticbarbus was previously a synonym of Acrossocheilus, but has recently been resurrected, and it currently contains the following four species:

- Masticbarbus clivosius (Lin, 1935)
- Masticbarbus iridescens (Nichols & Pope, 1927)
- Masticbarbus longipinnis (Wu, 1939)
- Masticbarbus microstoma (Pellegrin & Chevey, 1936)

The type species of Masticbarbus was called Masticbarbus pentafasciatus upon its description; this binomial is now under the synonymy of M. longipinnis (Wu, 1939).

== Habitat ==
All but one species in this genus live exclusively in freshwater habitats; the exception is M. iridescens, which can live in both freshwater and brackish environments.
