= Acrossocheilus spinifer =

Conservation status
- Least Concern (IUCN 3.1)

Scientific classification
- Kingdom: Animalia
- Phylum: Chordata
- Class: Actinopterygii
- Order: Cypriniformes
- Family: Cyprinidae
- Subfamily: Acrossocheilinae
- Genus: Acrossocheilus
- Species: A. spinifer

Binomial name
- Acrossocheilus spinifer L. Y. Yuan, Z. Q. Wu & E. Zhang, 2006

Species of fish

Acrossocheilus spinifer is a species of cyprinid fish. It occurs in the upper reaches of rivers and hill streams in Guangdong and Fujian in southern China.
