= Acrossocheilus malacopterus =

Conservation status
- Data Deficient (IUCN 3.1)

Scientific classification
- Kingdom: Animalia
- Phylum: Chordata
- Class: Actinopterygii
- Order: Cypriniformes
- Family: Cyprinidae
- Subfamily: Acrossocheilinae
- Genus: Acrossocheilus
- Species: A. malacopterus

Binomial name
- Acrossocheilus malacopterus E. Zhang, 2005

Species of fish

Acrossocheilus malacopterus is a species of ray-finned fish in the genus Acrossocheilus.
