= Làng Vạc =

Archaeological site in Vietnam

Làng Vạc is an archaeological site in the Cả River valley in northern central Vietnam. Excavations there yielded a number of coffins containing relics of the Bronze Age Dong Son culture.

Excavations by Vietnamese researchers at Lang Vac have uncovered over 100 graves with a wide range of Dong Son culture objects. An official public excavation report and map reports for the burial site has yet to be published, but it is known that an area of more than 600 square metres (6,500 sq ft) has been dug up prior to a second round of digging by a Japanese archaeology group started in 1990. A publication by Ngo Si Hoang in 1983 reported a wide variety of bronze objects in the area. The tools and weaponry included a variety of socketed axes, including several in unusual styles, often decorated with geometric patterns and colourful sides. Fishhooks, hoes and a chisel were also found, but one of the factors that set the site apart from other Dong Son archaeological sites was the relative abundance of daggers found at Lang Vac.

Almost 50 specimens of daggers were found, and many of these had hilts with human figures built into the top of the sheath. In one of the more intricate dagger hilts, a man's figure can be clearly discerned with his bracelets, earrings, patterned loincloth and a long plait fixed in place by the figure of an elephant.

In a second example of a hilt with a human figure, two stand out with their backs adjoining one another, their heads bent down and joined by an elephant figure. Two bronze swords, the longest of which spanned 43.5 cm were also found, along with four socketed spearheads. A crossbow trigger was also uncovered, which was taken by scholars to as a signal that the civilisation had made contact with Chinese weaponry.

Bronze bracelets and armlets were also plentiful at the excavation site, some of which were embellished with small bells. In addition, a variety of drums ranging from miniatures up to full size were also located. One large drum was uncovered, standing some 27.8 cm and with a tympanum of diameter 3.7 cm. This drum was decorated with scenes of birds in flight, bulls and water vessels, as well as circular and geometric patterns.

A second drum was uncovered in the third burial, while the fourth burial site included an especially large drum specimen. It stood almost half a metre tall and was decorated on the tympanum with four birds around the figure of a sun, which marked the middle of the drum.

One damaged drum depicting four toads on the tympanum was uncovered in burial 42, and animal art extended further to miniature drums and figurines. One such example was an elephant with two birds standing on its back. Stone and glass jewelry were also in abundance, but the specimens of clay pottery were plain and dominated by round based and footed bowls.

The wealth of metal goods found in the site was believed to be due to its proximity to deposits of tin. Two radiocarbon dates were reported for the objects. One places the site within 80 years of 850 CE, while another suggests that it dated to between 83 BCE and 225 CE.
