= Acrossocheilus beijiangensis =

Conservation status
- Least Concern (IUCN 3.1)

Scientific classification
- Kingdom: Animalia
- Phylum: Chordata
- Class: Actinopterygii
- Order: Cypriniformes
- Family: Cyprinidae
- Subfamily: Acrossocheilinae
- Genus: Acrossocheilus
- Species: A. beijiangensis

Binomial name
- Acrossocheilus beijiangensis H. W. Wu & R. D. Lin, 1977

Synonyms
- Acrossocheilus wenchowensis ssp. beijiangensis

Species of fish

Acrossocheilus beijiangensis is a species of ray-finned fish in the genus Acrossocheilus from southern China. Its common name is the thick-lipped barbel. It can reach the length of 13.1 cm (5.2 in).
