= Acrossocheilus parallens =

Conservation status
- Least Concern (IUCN 3.1)

Scientific classification
- Kingdom: Animalia
- Phylum: Chordata
- Class: Actinopterygii
- Order: Cypriniformes
- Family: Cyprinidae
- Subfamily: Acrossocheilinae
- Genus: Acrossocheilus
- Species: A. parallens

Binomial name
- Acrossocheilus parallens (Nichols, 1931)

Synonyms
- Barbus parallens Nichols, 1931

Species of fish

Acrossocheilus parallens is a species of cyprinid fish. It is found in streams and rivers of southern China (Hainan and Guangdong) and Taiwan. It grows to 21 cm (8.3 in) total length.
