= Masticbarbus microstoma =

Conservation status
- Data Deficient (IUCN 3.1)

Scientific classification
- Kingdom: Animalia
- Phylum: Chordata
- Class: Actinopterygii
- Order: Cypriniformes
- Family: Cyprinidae
- Subfamily: Acrossocheilinae
- Genus: Masticbarbus
- Species: M. microstoma

Binomial name
- Masticbarbus microstoma (Pellegrin & Chevey, 1936)

Synonyms
- Cyclocheilichthys microstoma Pellegrin & Chevey, 1936; Acrossocheilus microstoma (Pellegrin & Chevey, 1936)

Species of fish

Masticbarbus microstoma is a species of freshwater cyprinid fish native to northwestern Vietnam. It was considered conspecific with M. iridescens, but now they have been separated.
