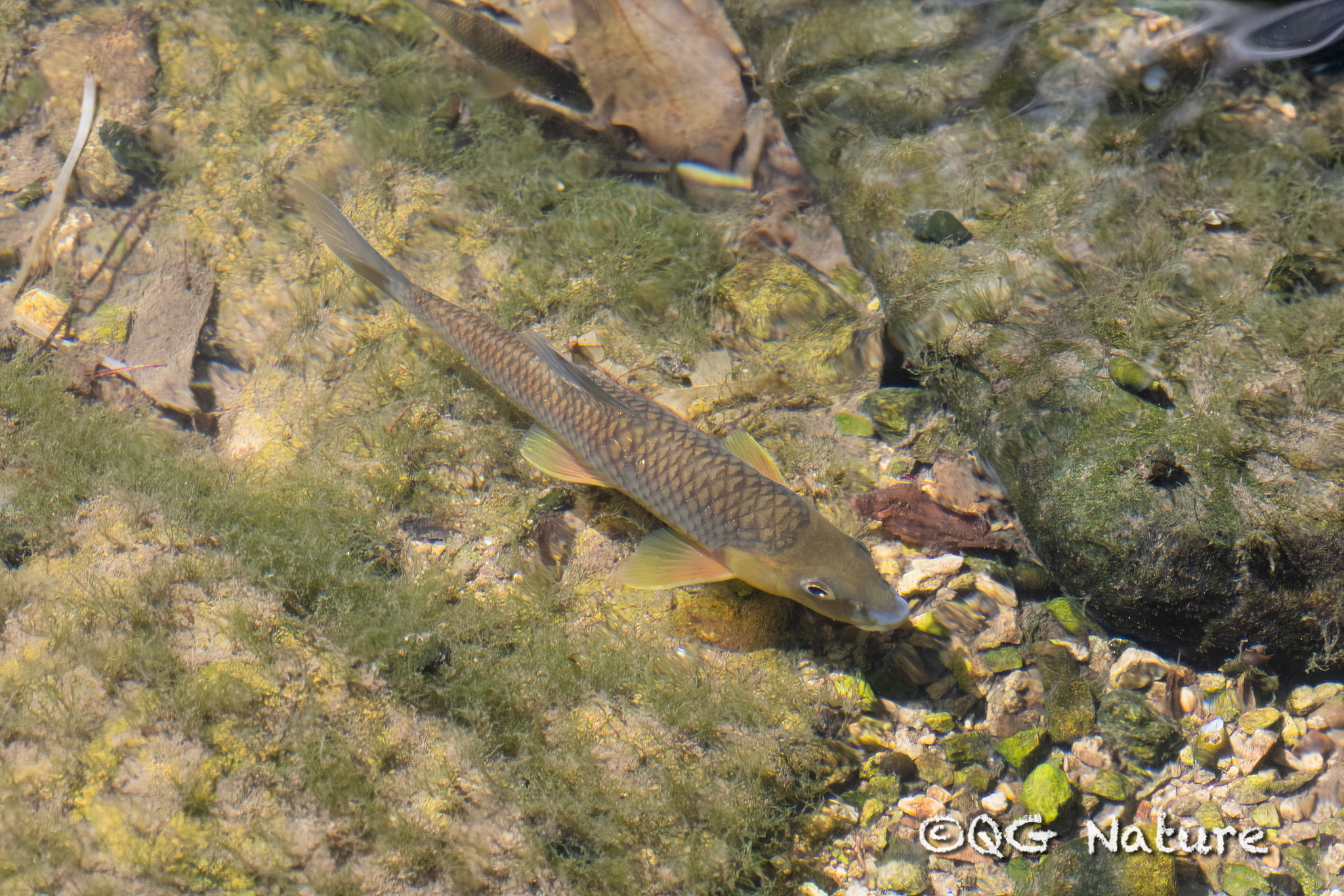

Conservation status
- Least Concern (IUCN 3.1)

Scientific classification
- Kingdom: Animalia
- Phylum: Chordata
- Class: Actinopterygii
- Order: Cypriniformes
- Family: Cyprinidae
- Subfamily: Acrossocheilinae
- Genus: Acrossocheilus
- Species: A. hemispinus

Binomial name
- Acrossocheilus hemispinus (Nichols, 1925)

Synonyms
- Barbus hemispinus Nichols, 1925

= Acrossocheilus hemispinus =

Species of fish

Acrossocheilus hemispinus is a species of ray-finned fish in the genus Acrossocheilus from Fujian and Zhejiang in China.
