= Acrossocheilus kreyenbergii =

Conservation status
- Data Deficient (IUCN 3.1)

Scientific classification
- Kingdom: Animalia
- Phylum: Chordata
- Class: Actinopterygii
- Order: Cypriniformes
- Family: Cyprinidae
- Subfamily: Acrossocheilinae
- Genus: Acrossocheilus
- Species: A. kreyenbergii

Binomial name
- Acrossocheilus kreyenbergii (Regan, 1908)

Synonyms
- Gymnostomus kreyenbergii Regan, 1908; Barbus kreyenbergii (Regan, 1908); Varicorhinus kreyenbergii (Regan, 1908); Acrossocheilus cinctus (Lin, 1931)

Species of fish

Acrossocheilus kreyenbergii is a species of cyprinid fish. It is known from the Guangxi, Jiangxi, Zhejiang, and Anhui provinces in southern and eastern China. It grows to 15.5 cm (6.1 in) standard length.
