= Acrossocheilus wenchowensis =

Conservation status
- Least Concern (IUCN 3.1)

Scientific classification
- Kingdom: Animalia
- Phylum: Chordata
- Class: Actinopterygii
- Order: Cypriniformes
- Family: Cyprinidae
- Subfamily: Acrossocheilinae
- Genus: Acrossocheilus
- Species: A. wenchowensis

Binomial name
- Acrossocheilus wenchowensis Ki. Fu. Wang, 1935

Synonyms
- Barbus wenchowensis (Wang, 1935)

Species of fish

Acrossocheilus wenchowensis is a species of ray-finned fish in the genus Acrossocheilus.
