= Acrossocheilus jishouensis =

Scientific classification
- Domain: Eukaryota
- Kingdom: Animalia
- Phylum: Chordata
- Class: Actinopterygii
- Order: Cypriniformes
- Family: Cyprinidae
- Subfamily: Acrossocheilinae
- Genus: Acrossocheilus
- Species: A. jishouensis

Binomial name
- Acrossocheilus jishouensis J. Zhao, X. L. Chen & W. W. Li, 1997

Species of fish

Acrossocheilus jishouensis is a species of cyprinid fish in the genus Acrossocheilus.
