= Acrossocheilus labiatus =

Conservation status
- Data Deficient (IUCN 3.1)

Scientific classification
- Kingdom: Animalia
- Phylum: Chordata
- Class: Actinopterygii
- Order: Cypriniformes
- Family: Cyprinidae
- Genus: Acrossocheilus
- Species: A. labiatus

Binomial name
- Acrossocheilus labiatus (Regan, 1908)

Synonyms
- Gymnostomus labiatus Regan, 1908; Acrossocheilus wuyiensis S. H. Wu & H. X. Chen, 1981

Species of ray-finned fish

Acrossocheilus labiatus is a species of freshwater ray-finned fish belonging to the family Cyprinidae, the carps, minnows and allied fishes. This species was regarded as a junior synonym of A. paradoxus by some authorities but is regarded as a valid species by others. This fish is endemic to Lake Candidius in Taiwan.
