= Tonkin =

Historical name for Northern Vietnam

Coordinates: 21.0000°N 106.0000°E

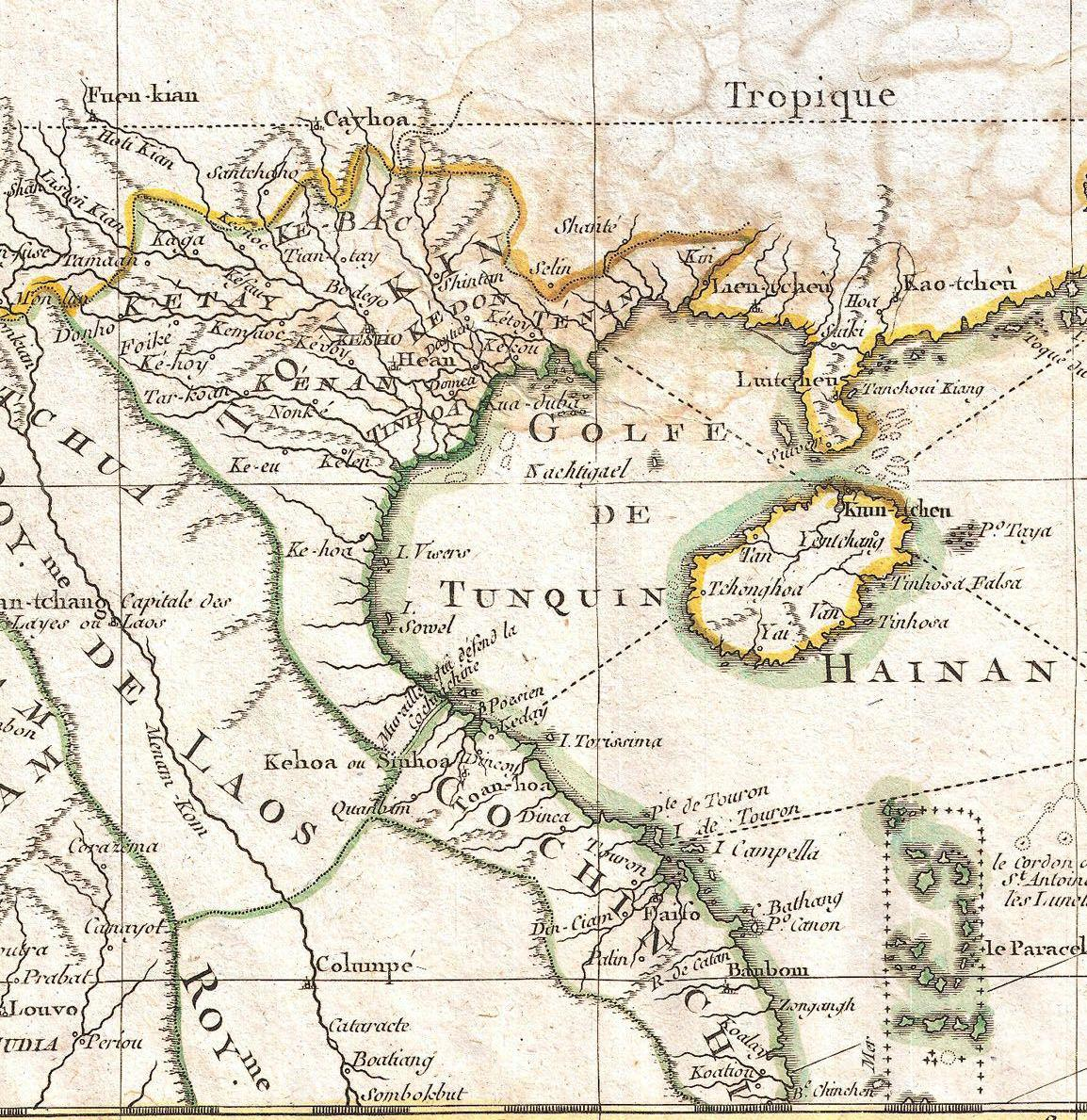
18th century Tonkin

Tonkin, also spelled Tongkin, Tonquin or Tongking, is an exonym referring to the area surrounding the Red River Delta of northern Vietnam. During the 17th and 18th centuries, this term referred to the domain of Đàng Ngoài, under the control of the Trịnh lords, encompassing both the Northern region proper and the Thanh–Nghệ region, north of the Gianh River at the 17.7th parallel. From 1883 to early 1945, the term referred to the French protectorate of Tonkin, which comprised only the Northern region, approximately north of the 20th parallel.

== Names ==
"Tonkin" is a Western rendition of 東京 Đông Kinh (17th century Vietnamese pronunciation [ɗoŋ˧˧ kiŋ˧˧]), meaning 'Eastern Capital'. It is a cognate, through Middle Chinese, of the name of the Japanese capital Tokyo. This was the name of the capital of the Lê dynasty (present-day Hanoi).

== Geography ==
Tonkin is located south of Yunnan (Vân Nam) and Guangxi (Quảng Tây) in China, east of northern Laos, west of the Gulf of Tonkin and north of Thanh Hóa province.

Being on a fertile delta by the Red River, Tonkin is rich in rice production.

== History ==
The area was called Văn Lang from around 2000–200 BC. Evidence of the earliest established society in northern Vietnam, along with the Đông Sơn culture, was discovered in the Cổ Loa Citadel area, located near present-day Hanoi (the capital city of Vietnam).

According to Vietnamese myths the first Vietnamese peoples descended from the Dragon Lord Lạc Long Quân and the Immortal Goddess Âu Cơ. Lạc Long Quân and Âu Cơ had 100 sons before they decided to part ways. 50 of the children went with their mother to the mountains, and the other 50 went with their father to the sea. The eldest son became the first in a line of earliest Vietnamese kings, collectively known as the Hùng kings of the Hồng Bàng dynasty. The country was called Văn Lang and its people were referred to as the Lạc Việt.

By the 3rd century BC, another Viet group, the Âu Việt, emigrated to the Red River delta and mixed with the indigenous population. A new kingdom, Âu Lạc, emerged as the union of the Âu Việt and the Lạc Việt, with Thục Phán proclaiming himself An Dương Vương.

Âu Lạc was annexed into Nam Việt kingdom of Triệu Đà. After the Triệu dynasty, this region started to be officially under Chinese rule. In pre-Tang times Tonkin was the port of call for ships on the South China Sea, though the center of commerce later moved north to Guangdong.

The victory of Ngô Quyền at the Battle of Bạch Đằng in 938 ushered a new era of independence of Vietnam. The Ngô dynasty was followed by the Đinh, Early Lê, Lý, Trần, and Hồ.

=== 15th and 16th centuries ===
Lê Lợi (reigned 1428–1433), a notable landowner in the Lam Sơn region, had a following of more than 1,000 people before rising up against rule of the Chinese Ming dynasty. Following his victory he mounted the throne and established himself in the city of Thăng Long ('Ascending Dragon'), present Hà Nội. Thăng Long was also called Đông Kinh 東京, meaning 'Eastern Capital' (東京 is identical in meaning and written form in Chinese characters to that of Tokyo).

=== 17th and 18th centuries ===
During the 17th and 18th centuries, Westerners commonly used the name Tonkin (from Đông Kinh) to refer to Đàng Ngoài in the North, ruled by the Trịnh lords. Đàng Ngoài, or Bắc Hà, included not only the delta of the Red River, but also the deltas of the Mã River and Cả River. Meanwhile, Cochinchina or Quinan was used to refer to Đàng Trong in the South, ruled by the Nguyễn lords; and Annam, from the name of the former Chinese province, was used to refer to Vietnam as a whole.

=== 19th and 20th centuries ===
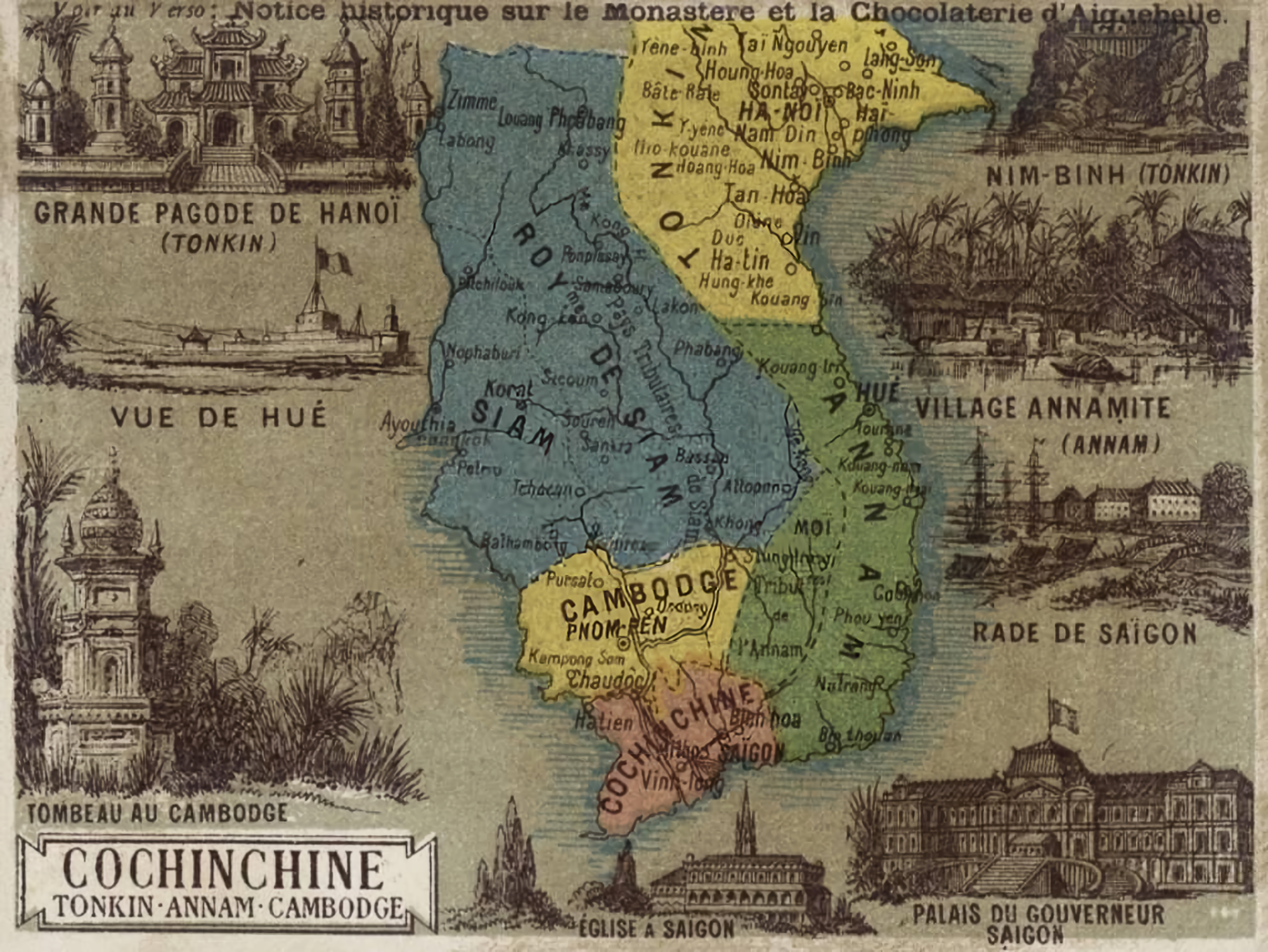
C. 1883 map of Indochina, showing Tonkin under its earlier geographical definition.

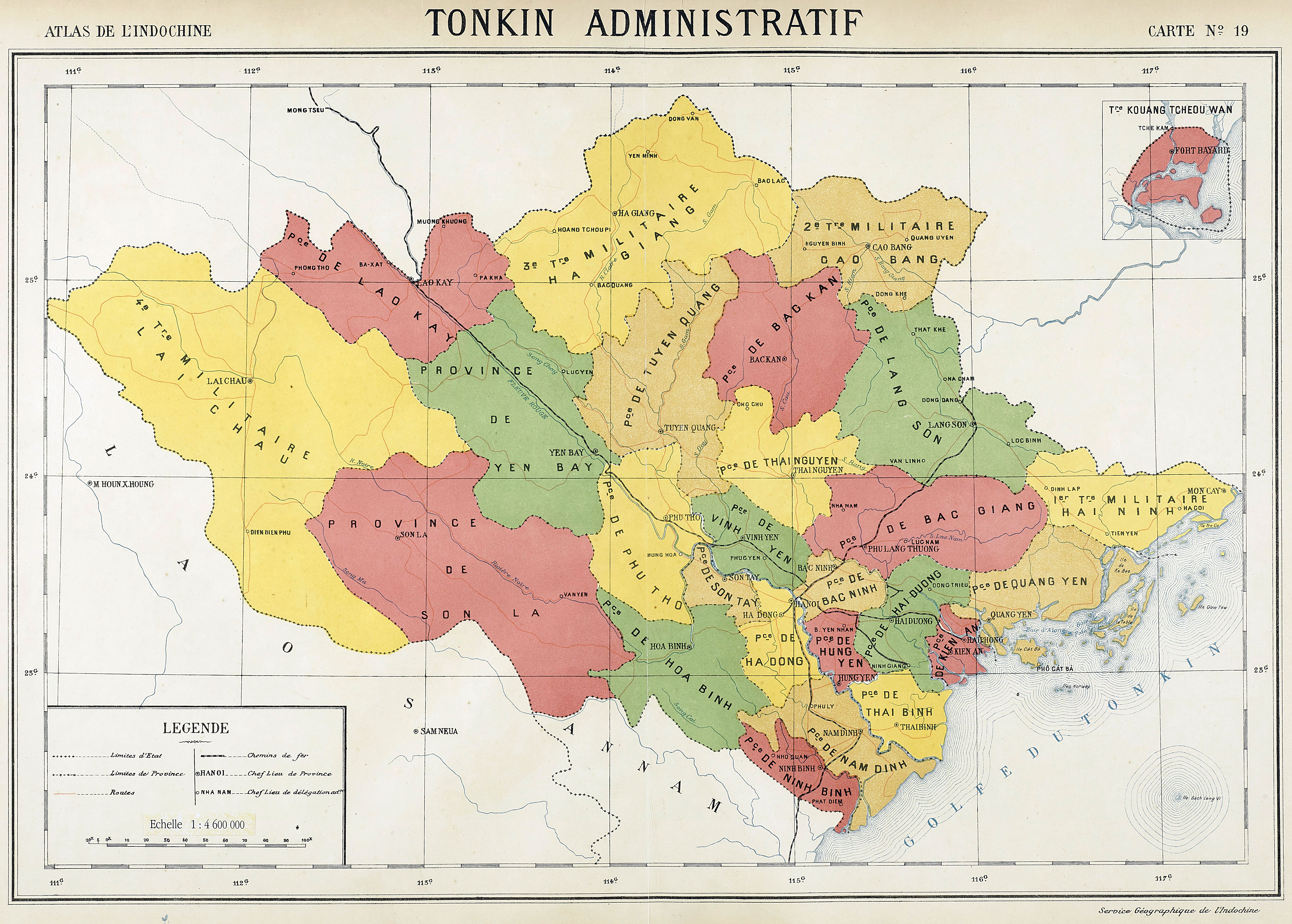
Administrative divisions of Tonkin, 1920

After French assistance to Nguyễn Ánh to unify Vietnam under the Nguyễn dynasty, the French Navy began its heavy presence in Lower Cochinchina, including Saigon, and later colonized the whole of this southern third of Vietnam in 1867.

During the Sino-French War (1884–1885), Tonkin, then considered a crucial foothold in Southeast Asia and a key to the Chinese market, was invaded by the French in the Tonkin Campaign. It was colonized as the French protectorate of Tonkin, and was gradually separated from the French protectorate of Annam, with Vietnam being effectively separated into three parts.

During French colonial rule within French Indochina, Hanoi was the capital of Tonkin protectorate, and in 1901 became the capital of all French Indochina (Cambodia, Laos, & Vietnam). French colonial administration ruled until 9 March 1945, including 1941–1945 during the World War II Japanese occupation of Vietnam. French administration was allowed by the Japanese as a puppet government. Japan briefly took full control of Vietnam in March 1945, as the Empire of Vietnam. Tonkin became a site of the Vietnamese famine of 1944–1945 during this period.

After the end of World War II, French rule returned over French Indochina. The Northern part of Vietnam became a stronghold for the communist Viet Minh. Hanoi was later reoccupied by the French and conflict between the Viet Minh and France broke out into the First Indochina War. In 1949 it came under the authority of the State of Vietnam, a new associated state of the French Union.

After the French defeat at the Battle of Dien Bien Phu in western Tonkin, and signature of Geneva accords in 1954, the communist nation of North Vietnam was formed, consisting of Tonkin and northern Annam. The State of Vietnam's territory was reduced to the southern half of the country, becoming South Vietnam.

In 1964, the US and North Vietnamese were involved in a battle off the coast, known as the Gulf of Tonkin Incident.

== Gallery ==
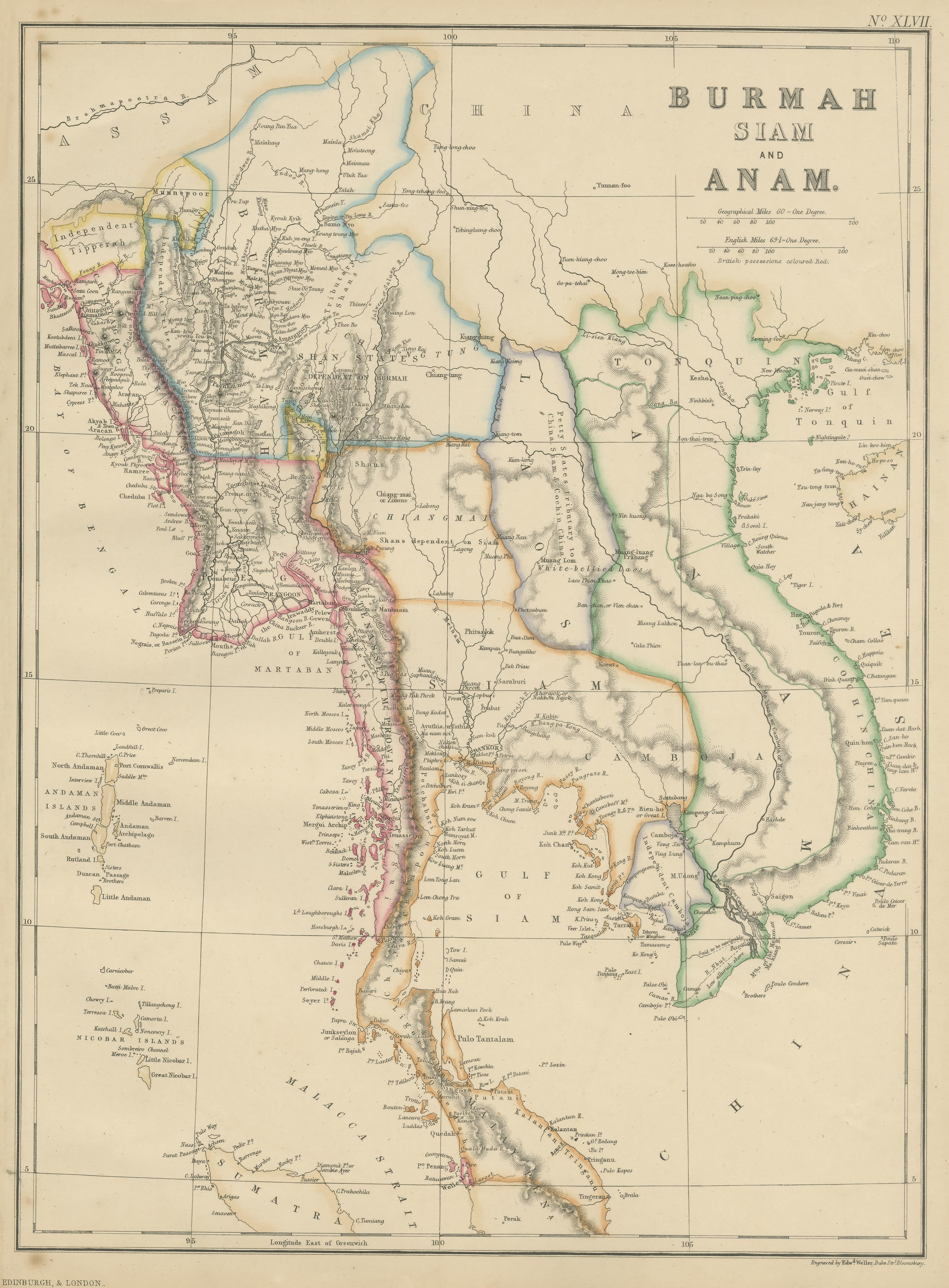
1859 Indochina map, showing the 18th-century conception of Tonkin

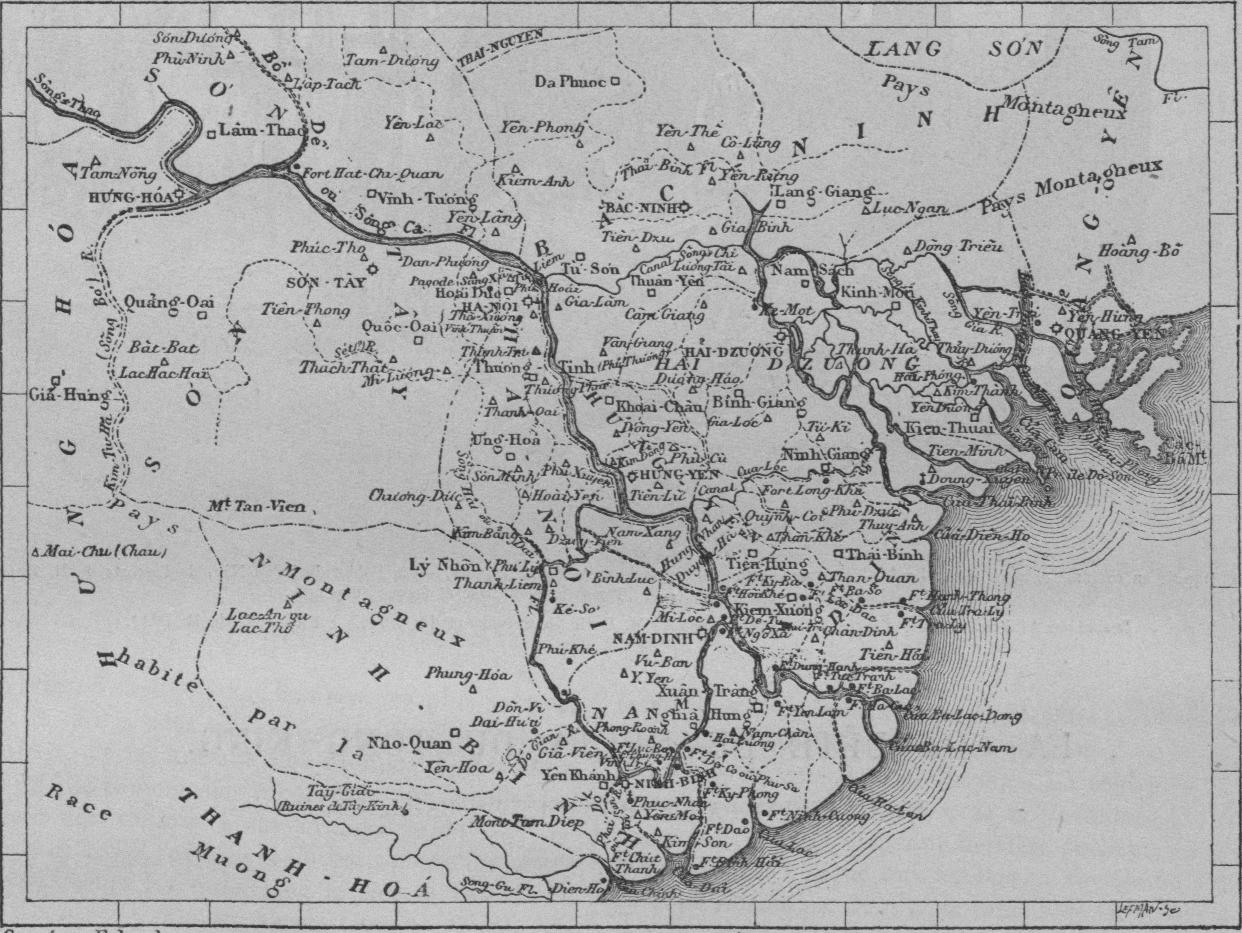
Tonkin delta, 1873

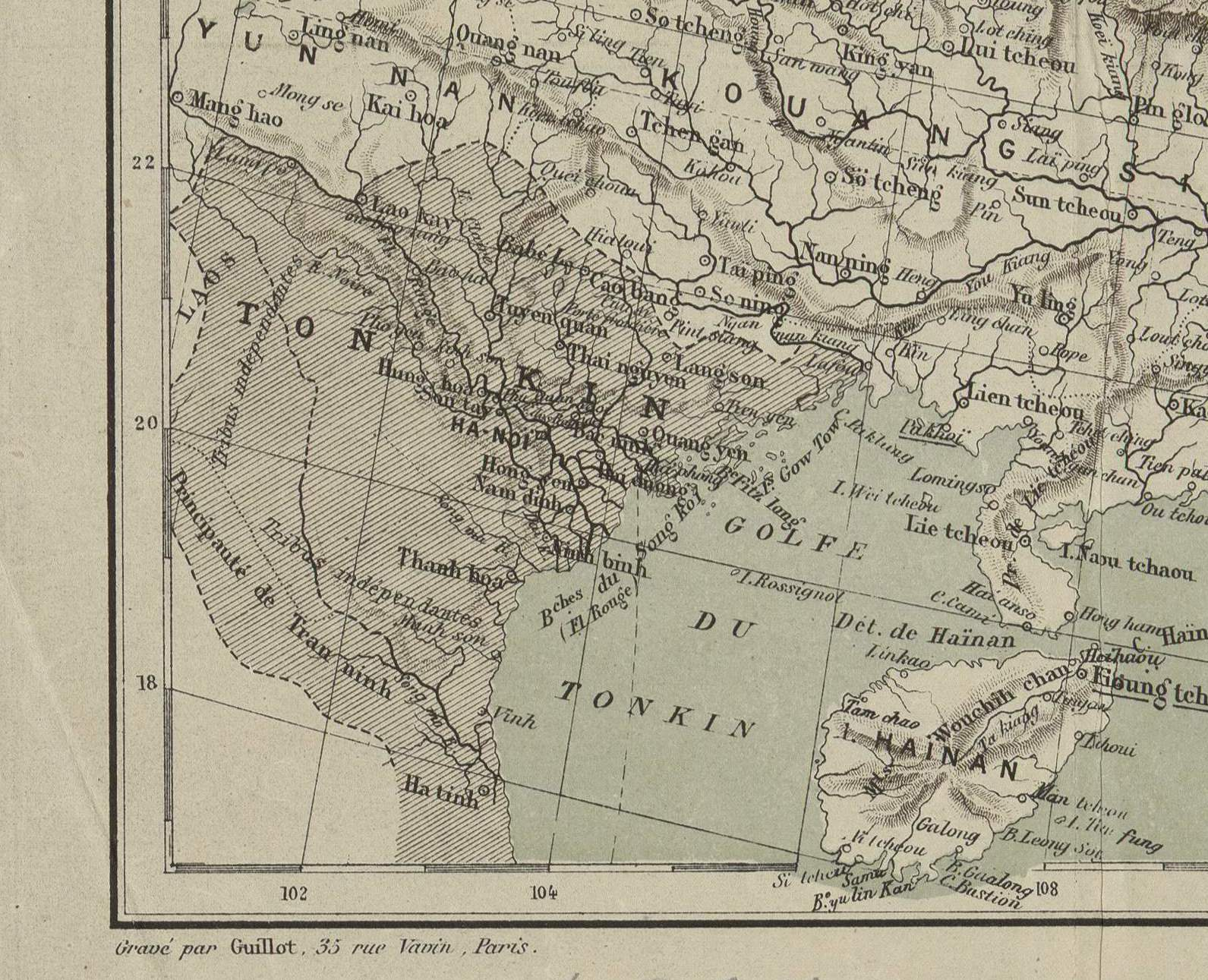
Tonkin, 1880s

Tonkin, 1883

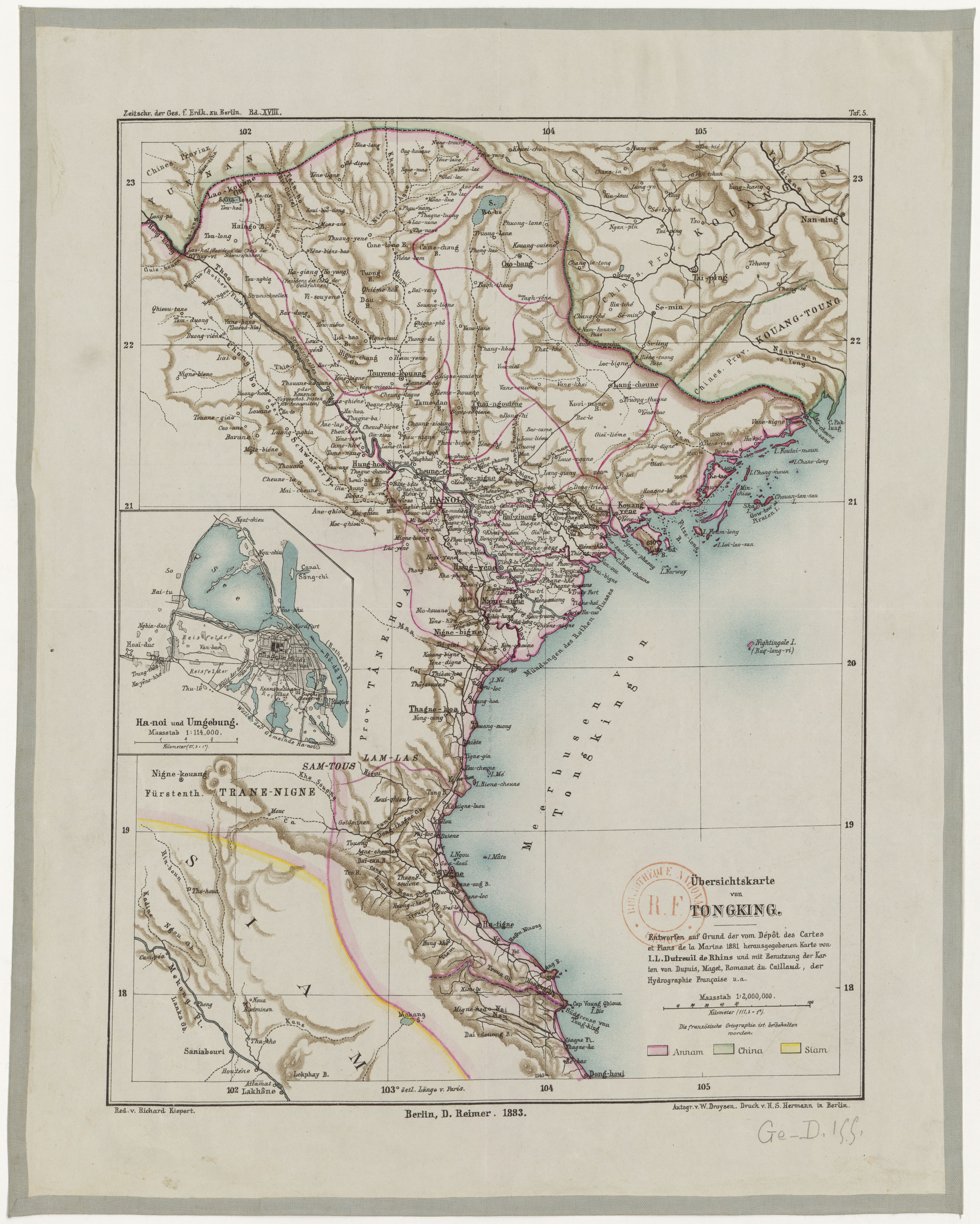
Tonkin, 1883

Tonkin, 1889

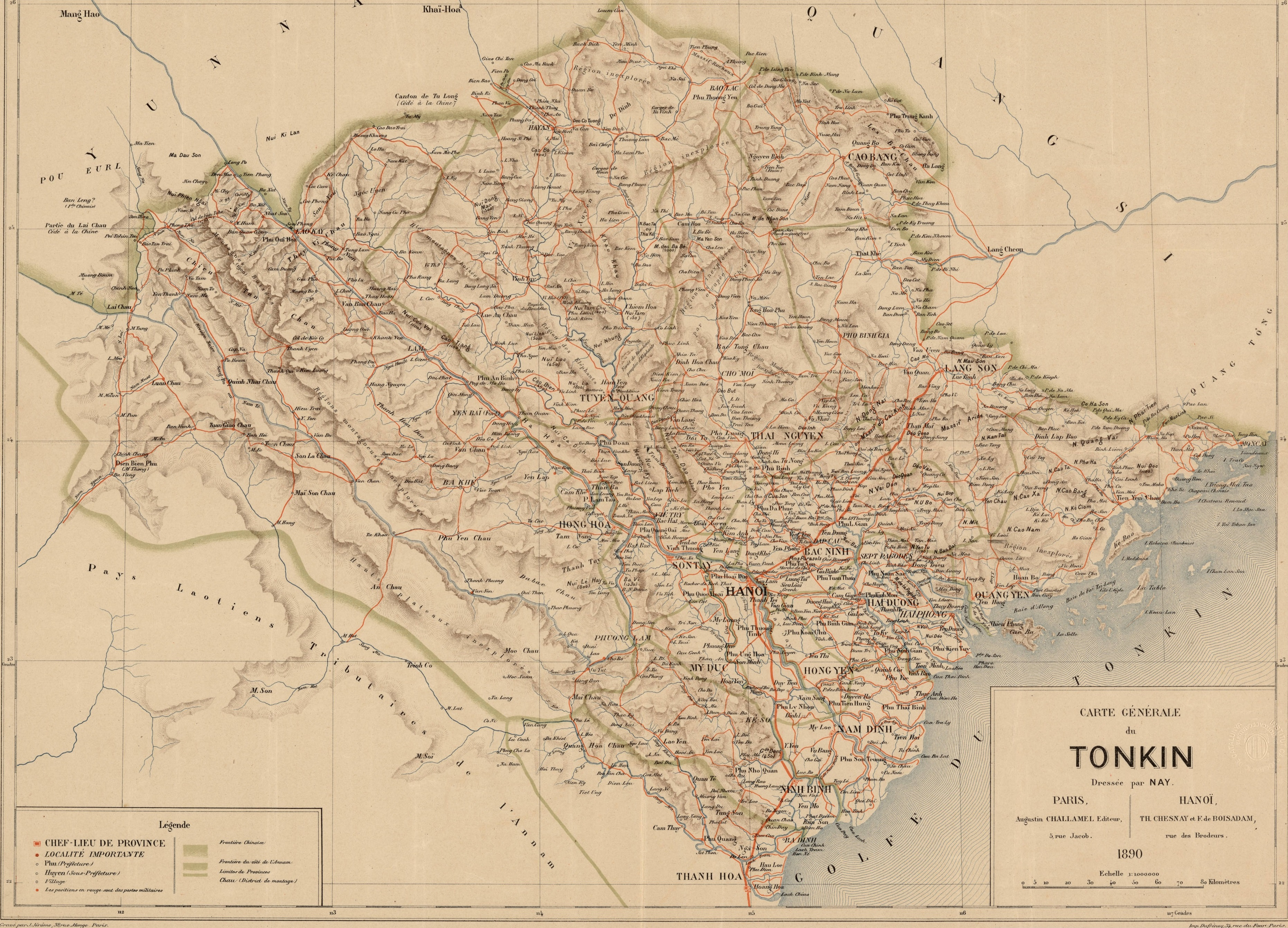
Tonkin, 1890

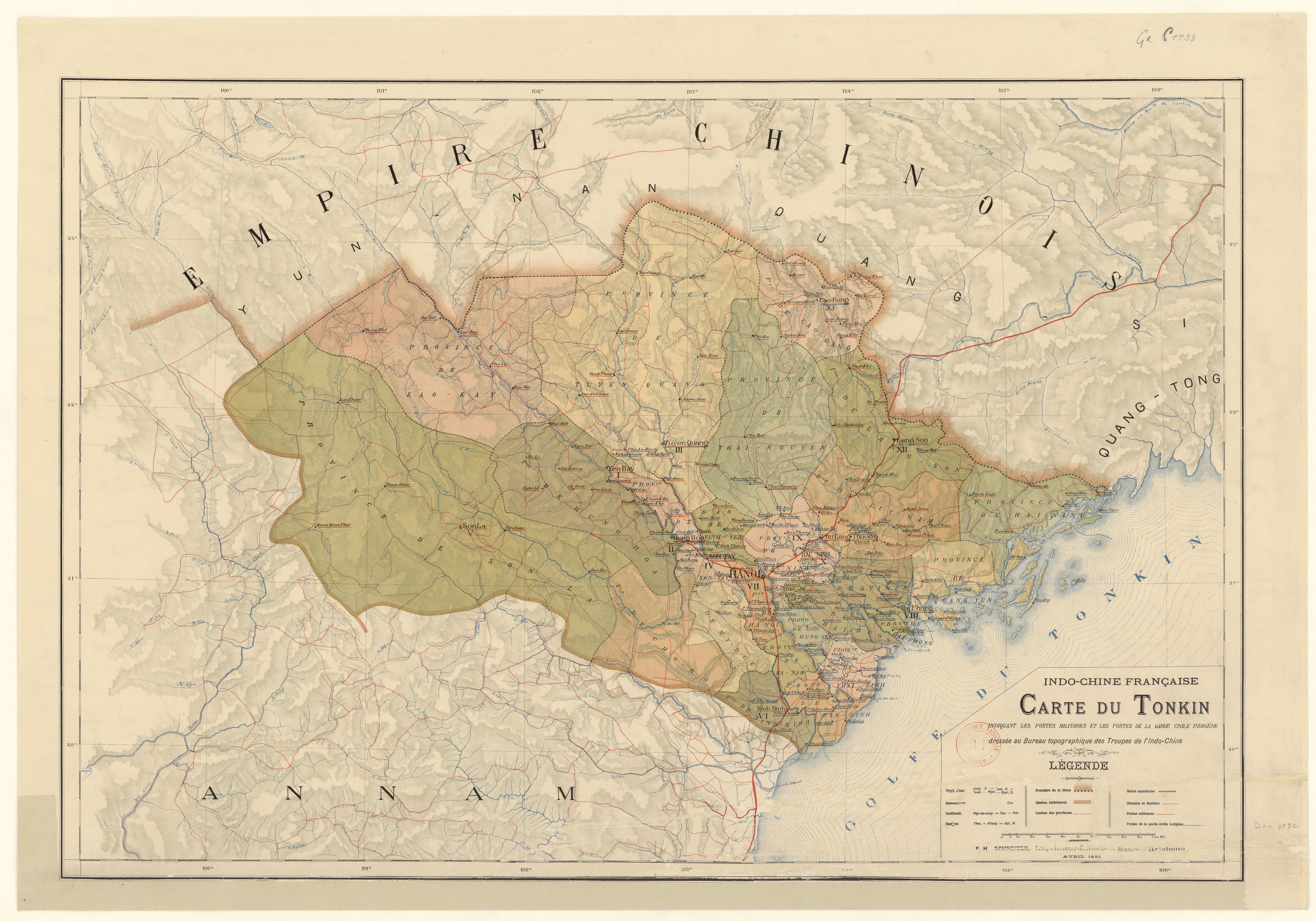
Tonkin, 1891

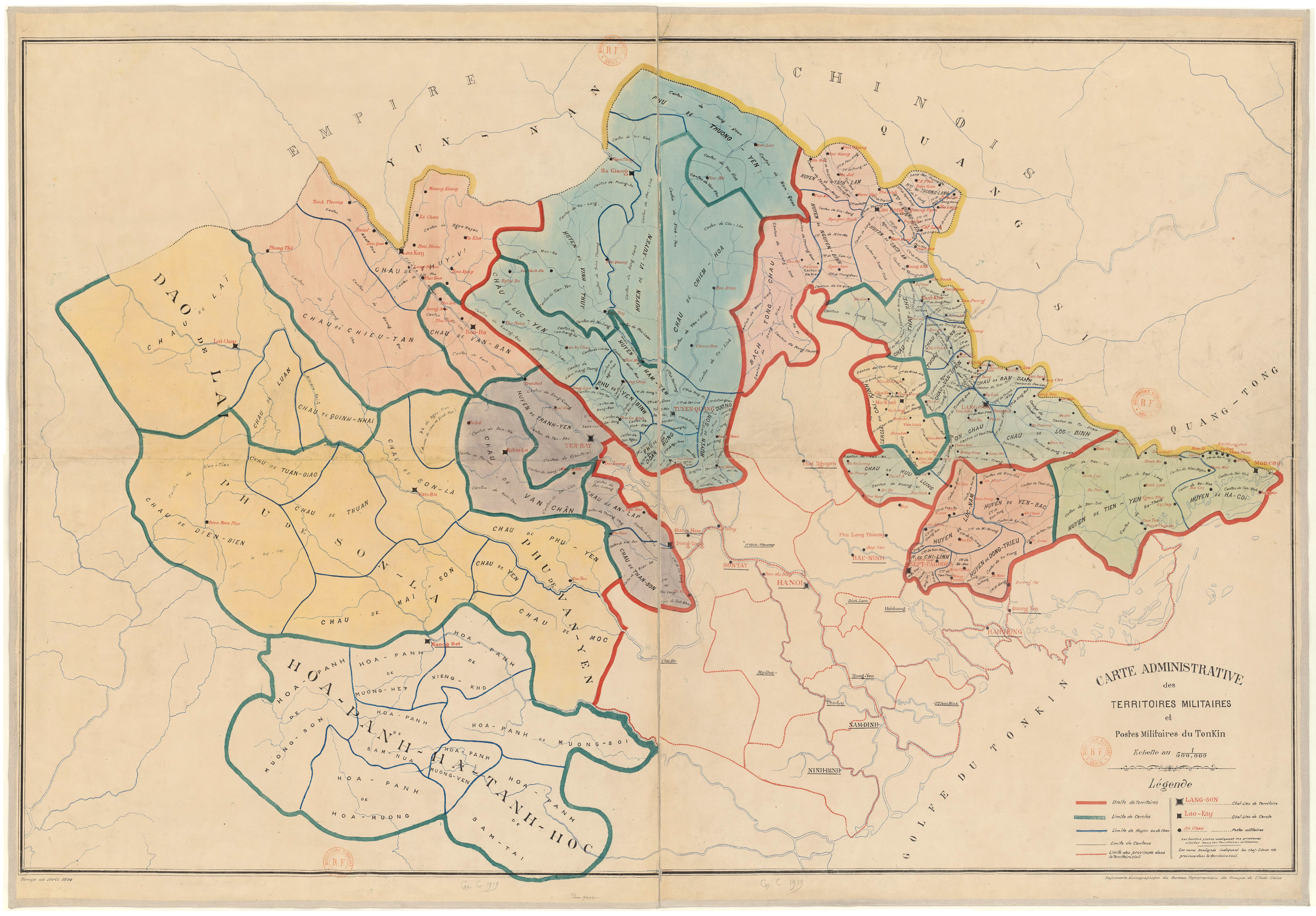
Tonkin, 1894

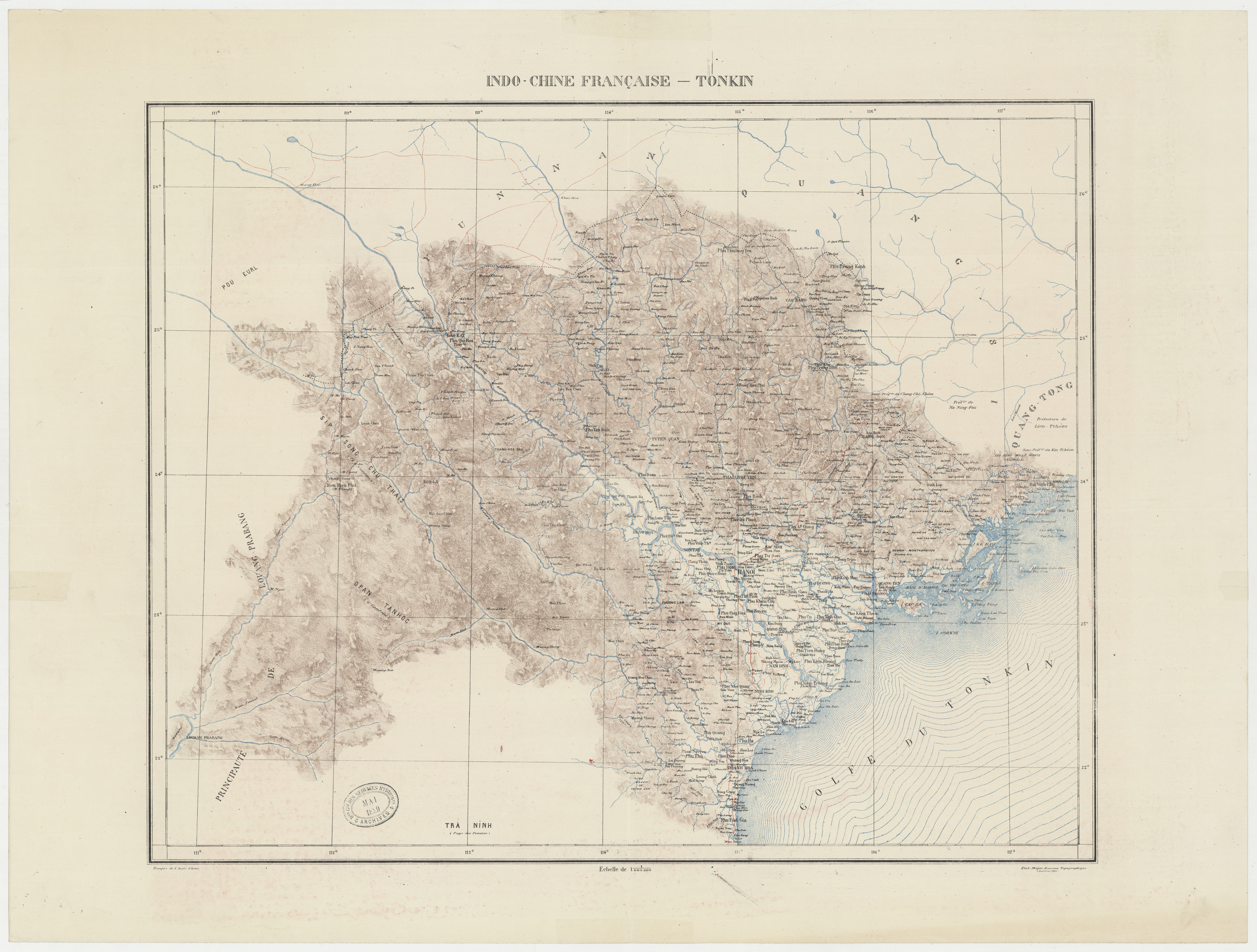
Tonkin, 1889–1895

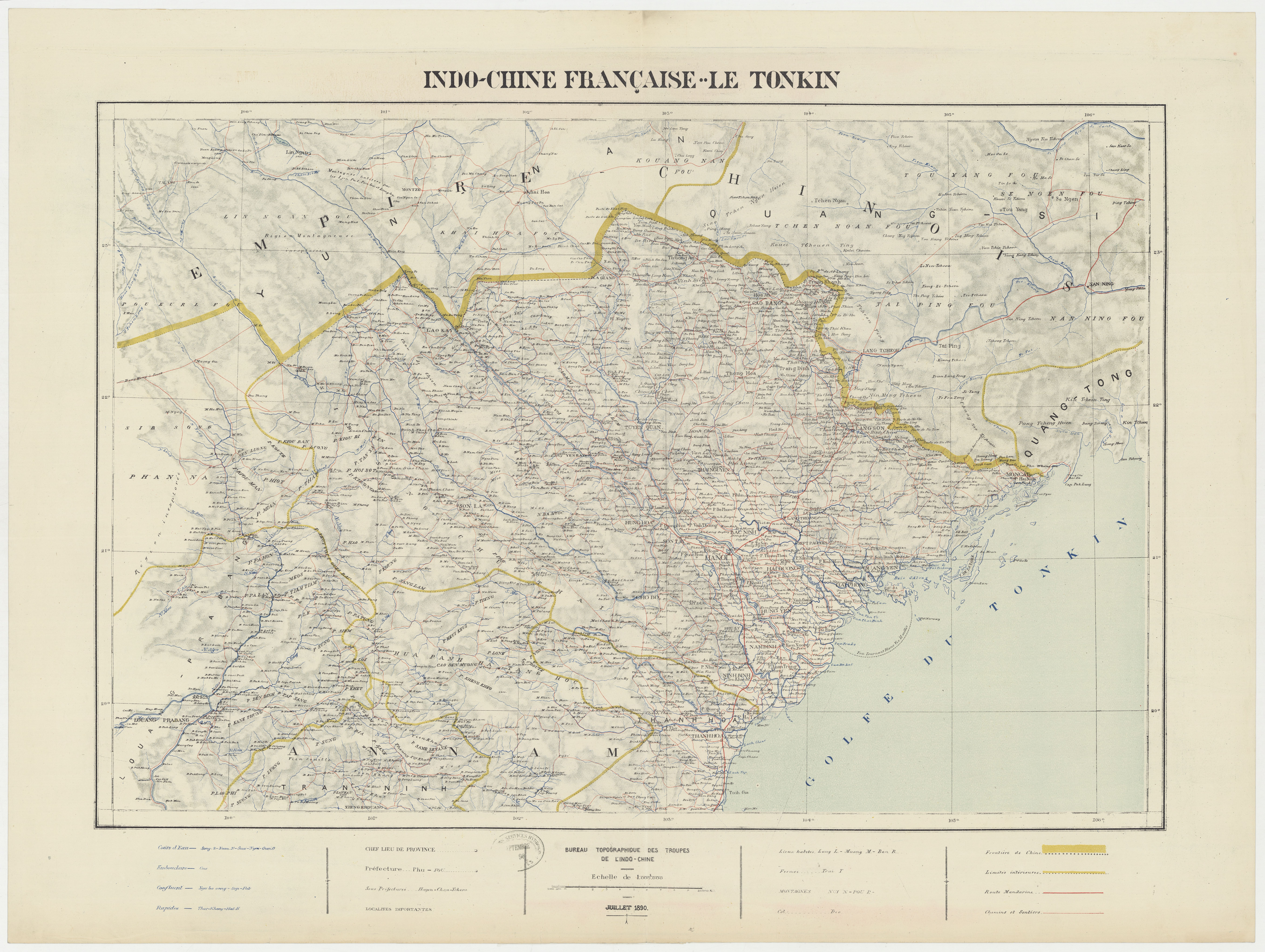
Tonkin, 1889–1895

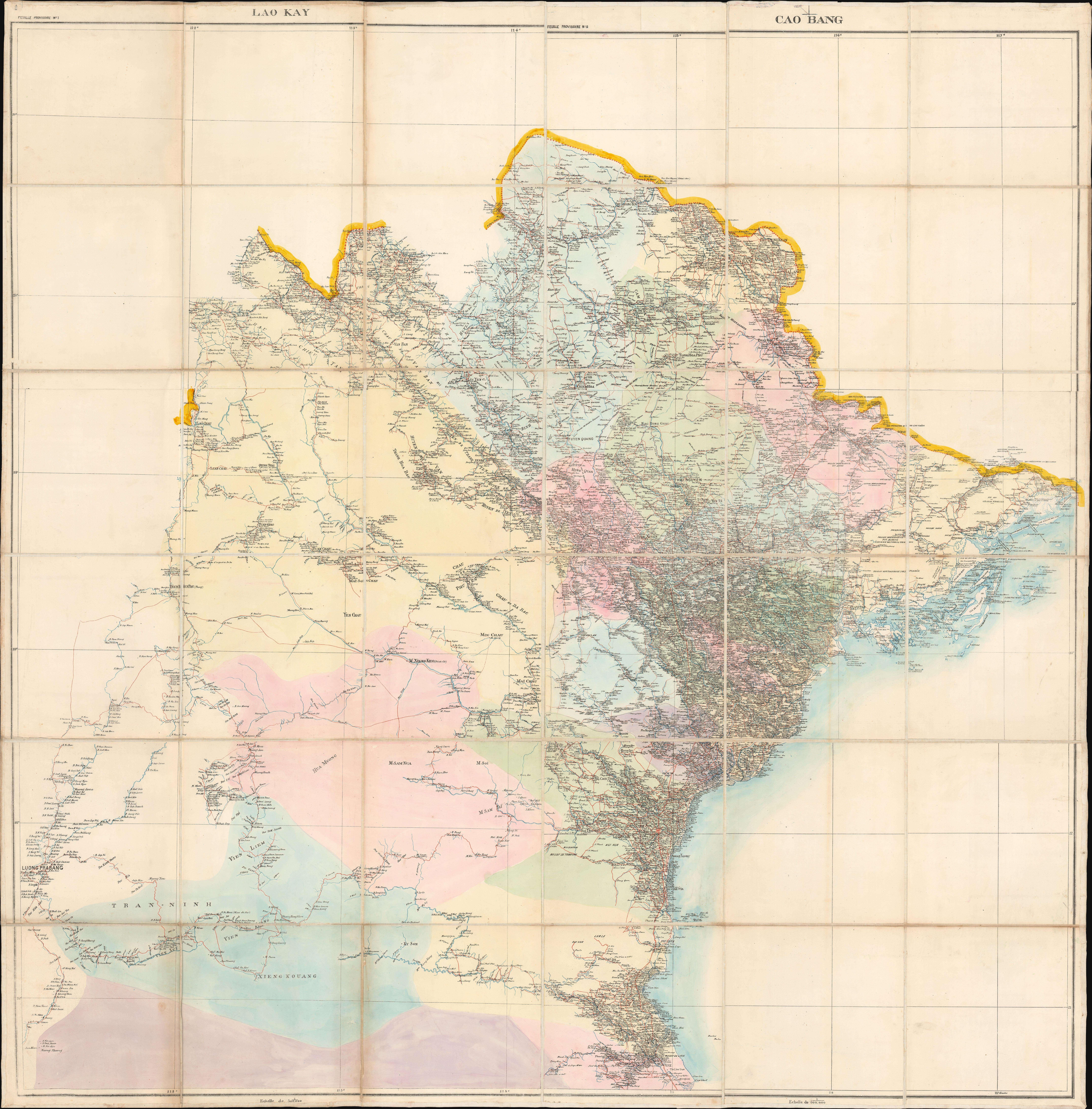
Tonkin, 1899

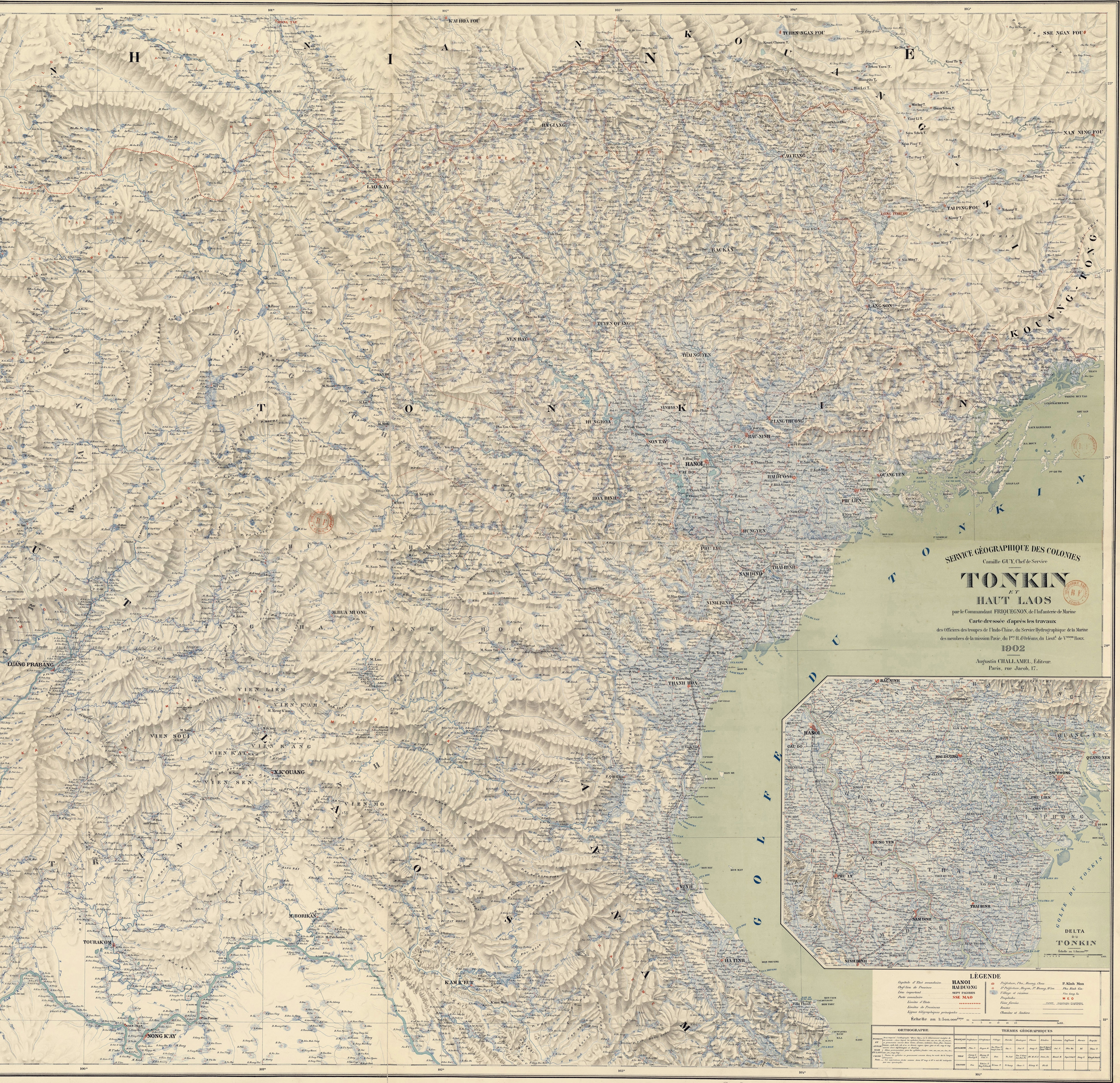
Tonkin, 1902

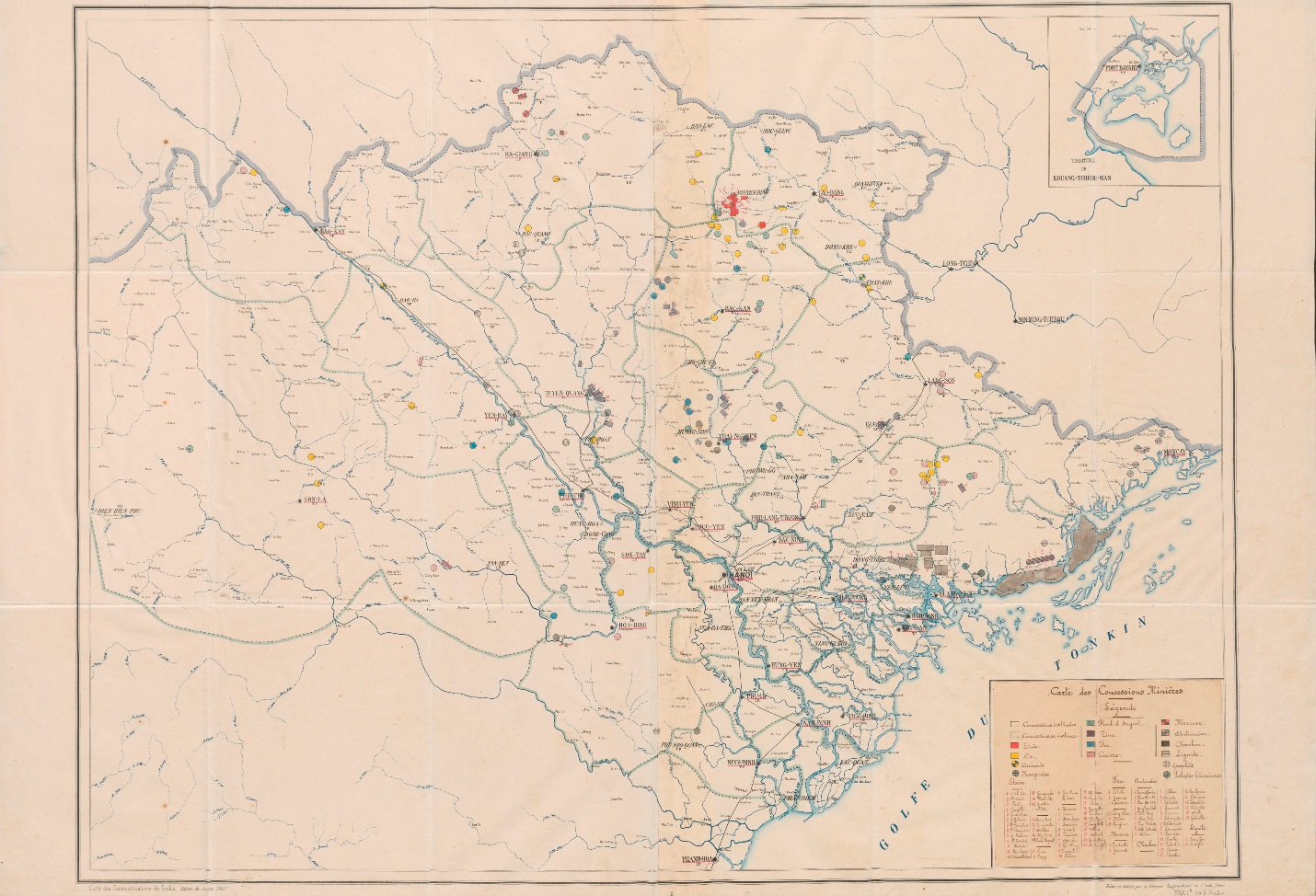
Tonkin, 1900–1909

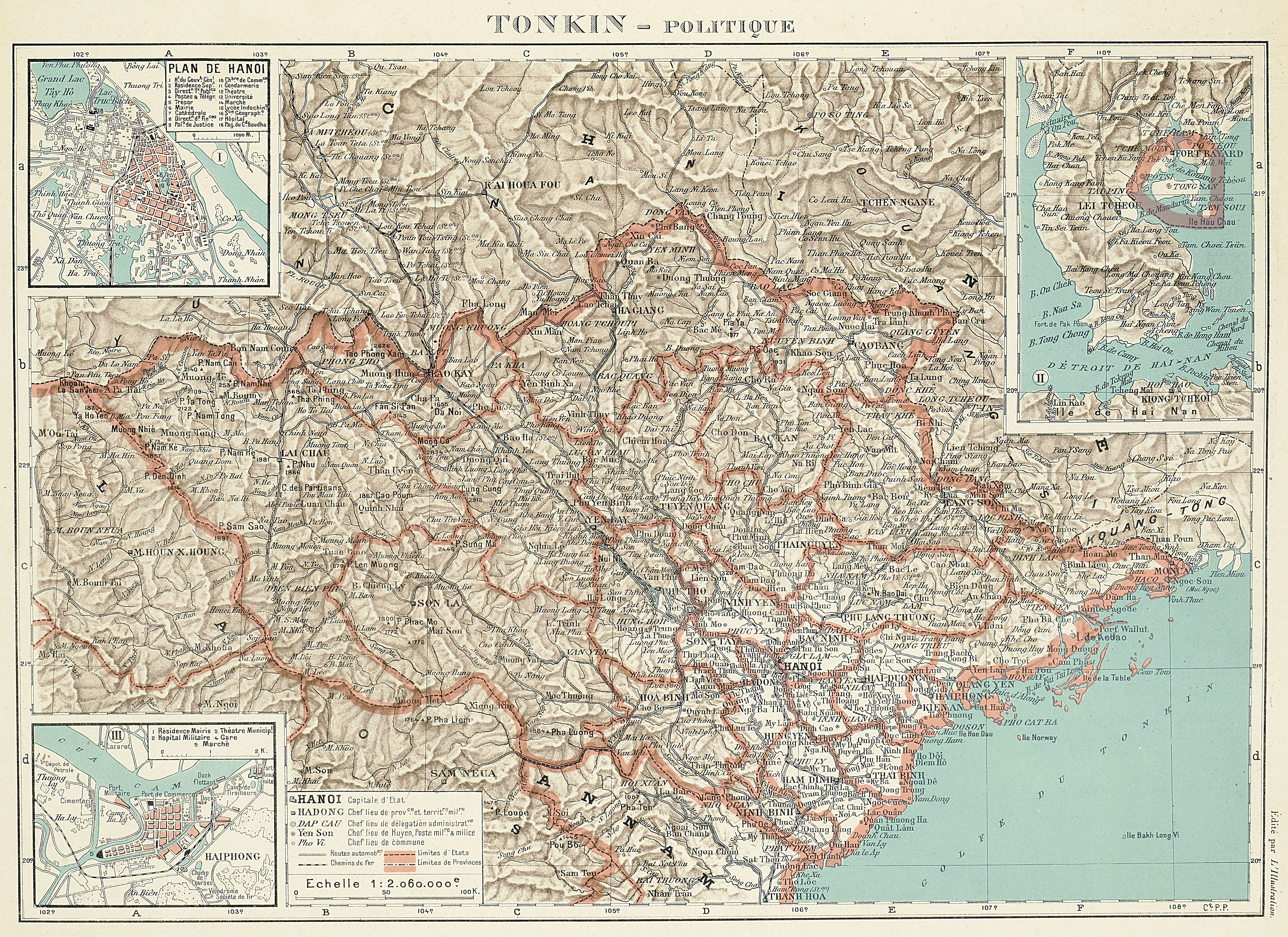
Administrative divisions of Tonkin, 1929

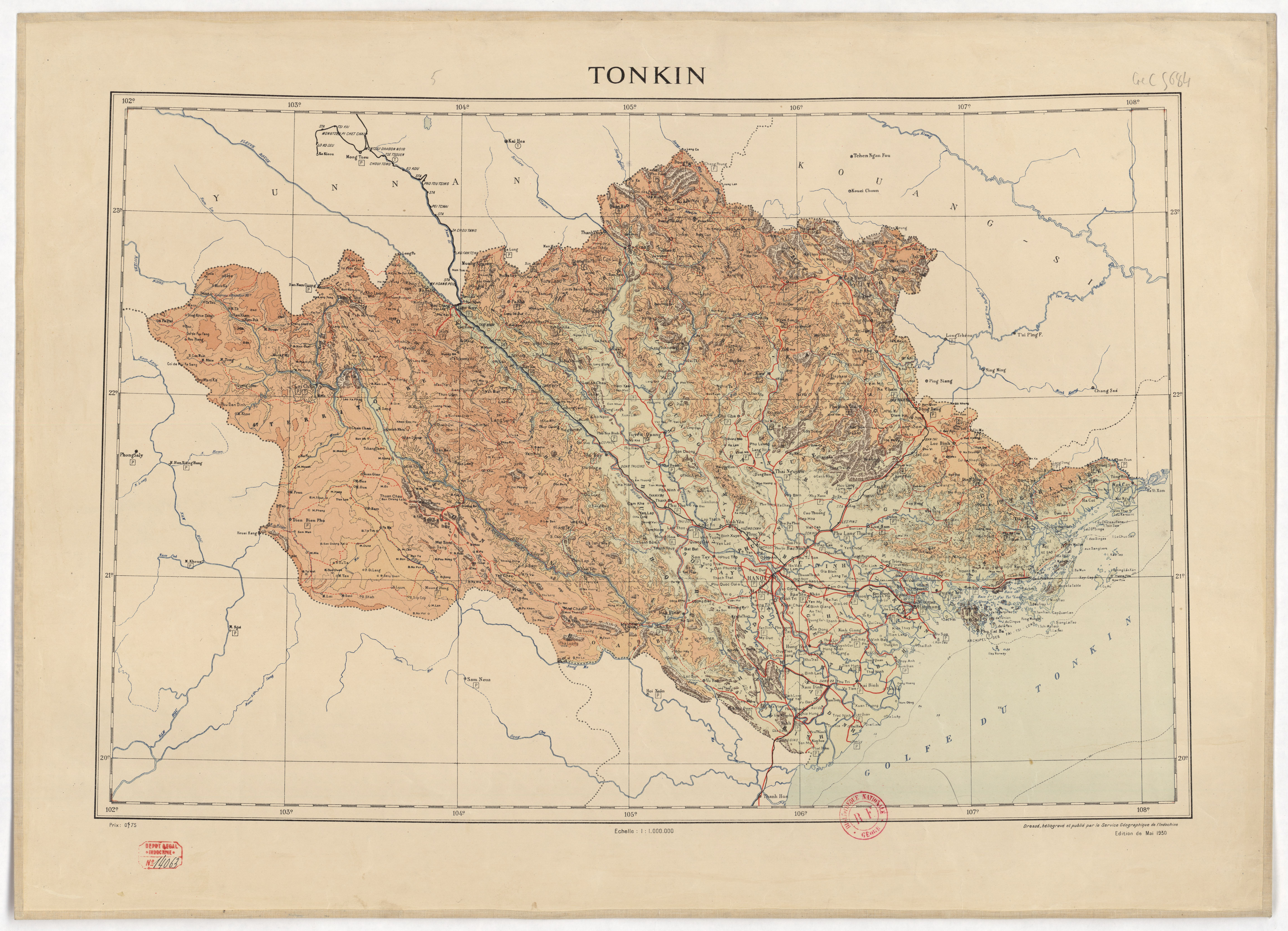
Tonkin, 1930

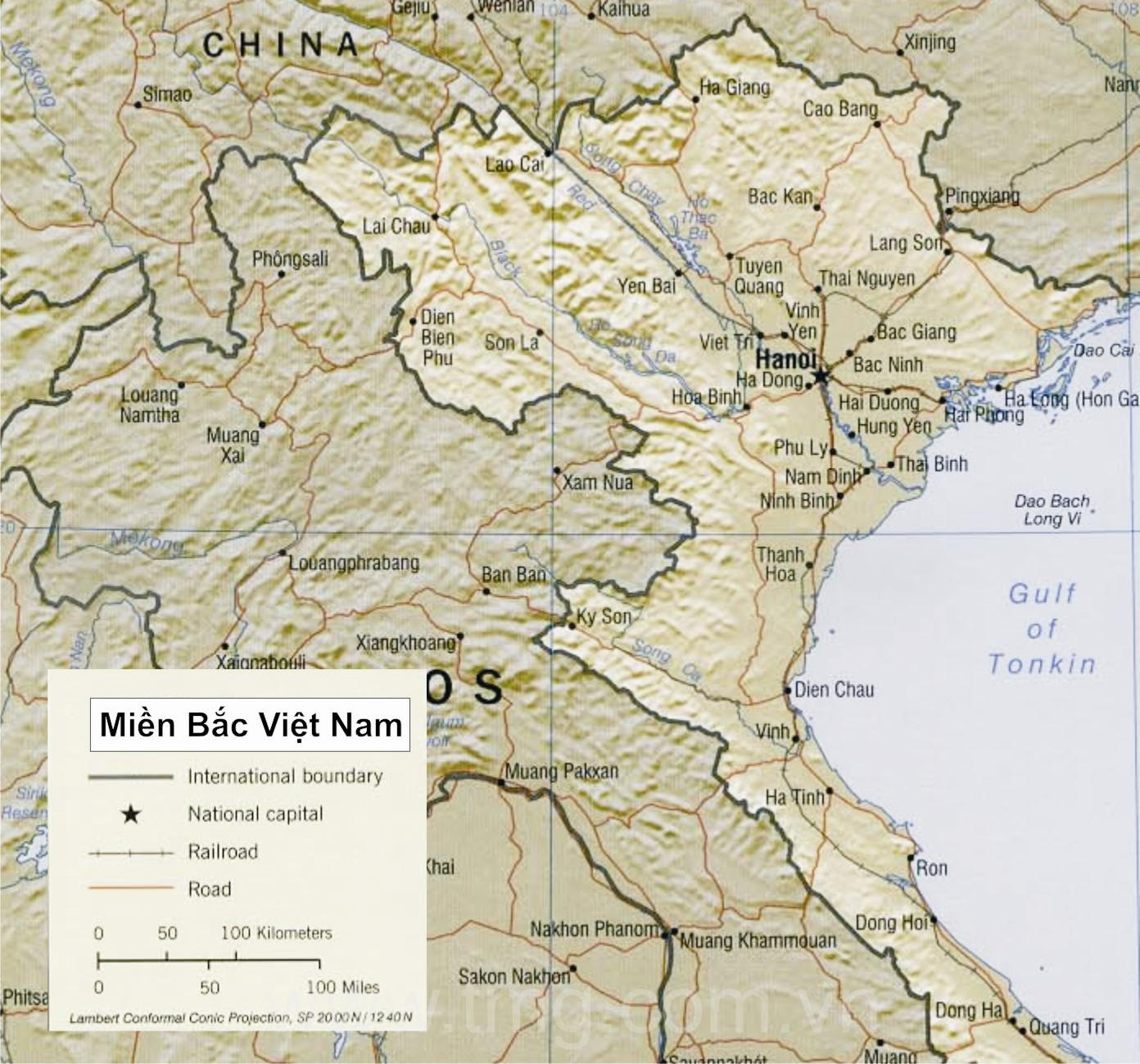
Modern map

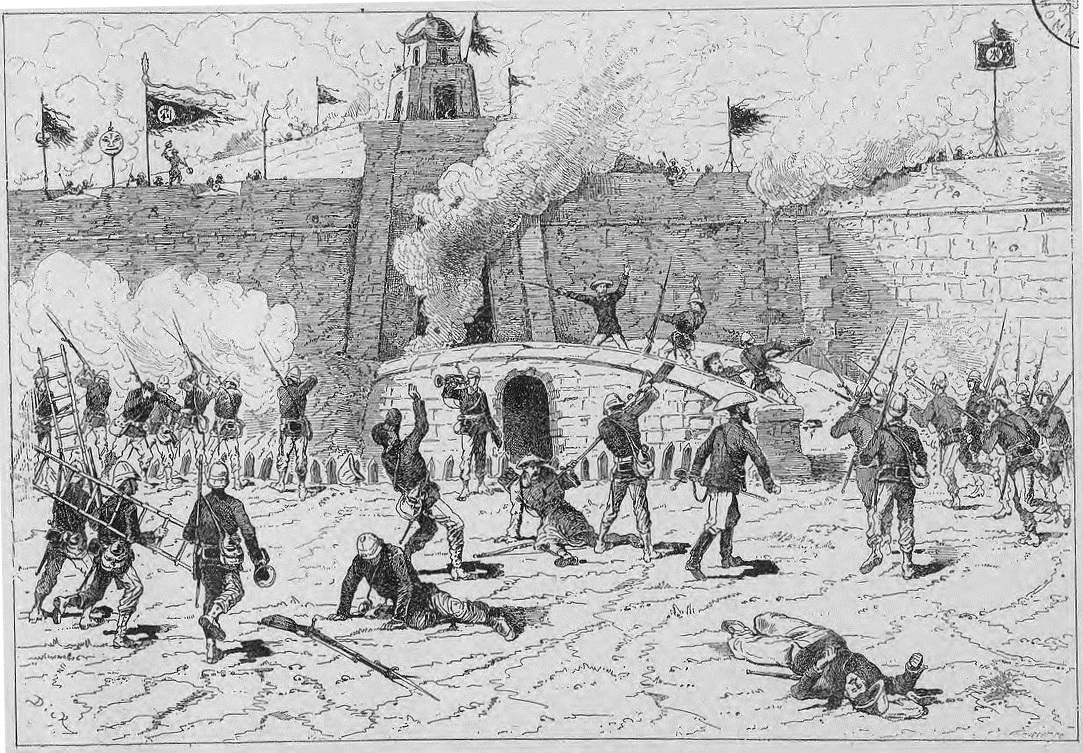
Capture of Nam Định, 1883

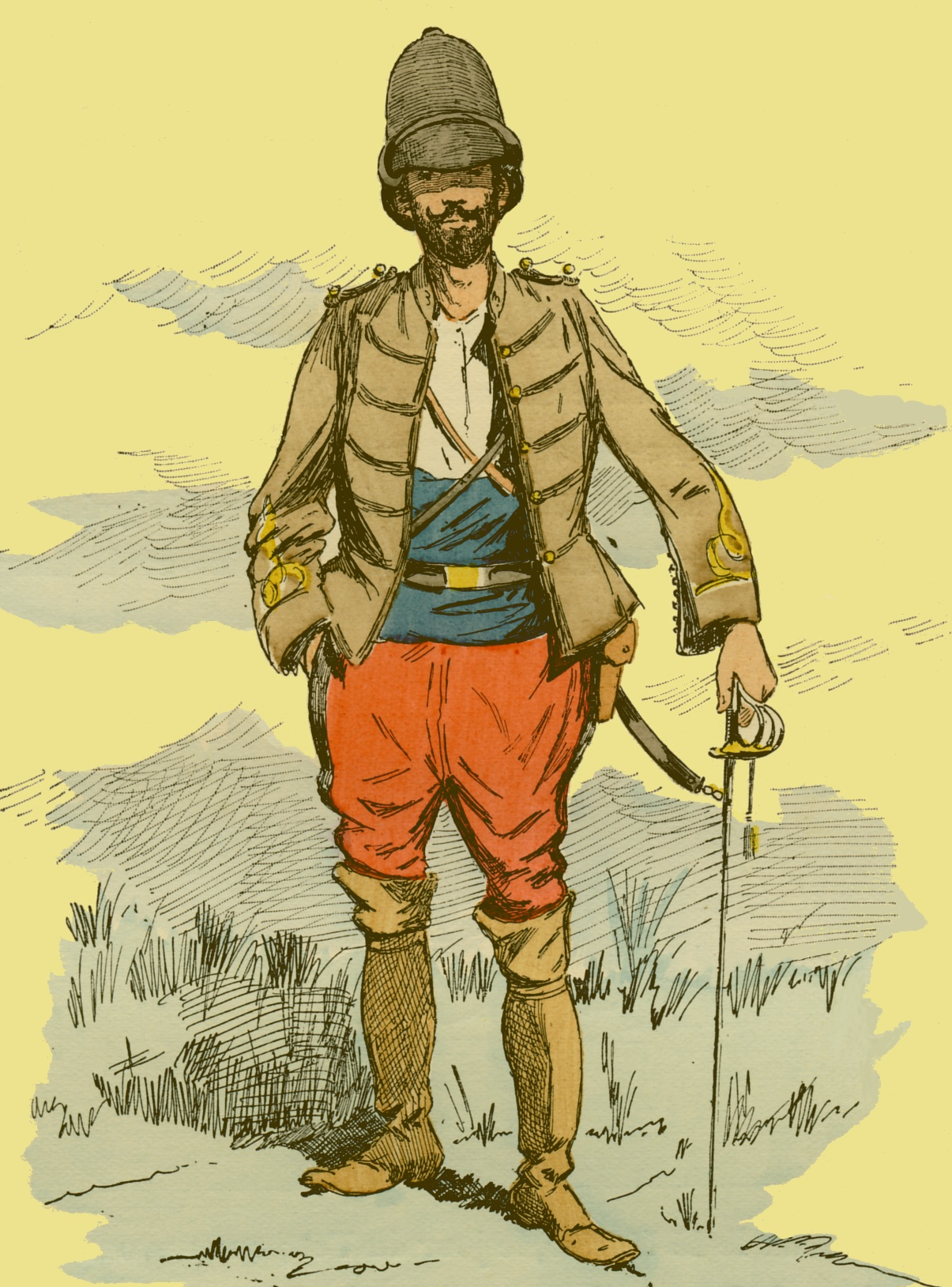
French zouave officer in Tonkin, Spring 1885

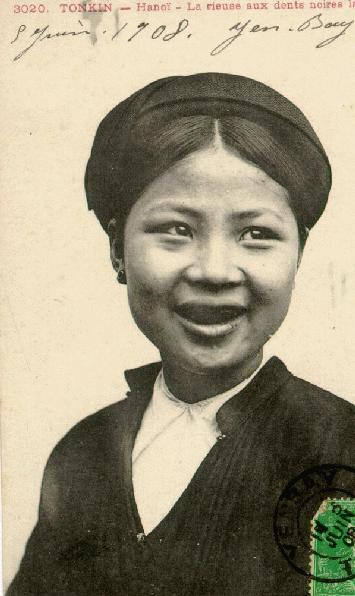
Tonkin woman with black-painted teeth, ca. 1908

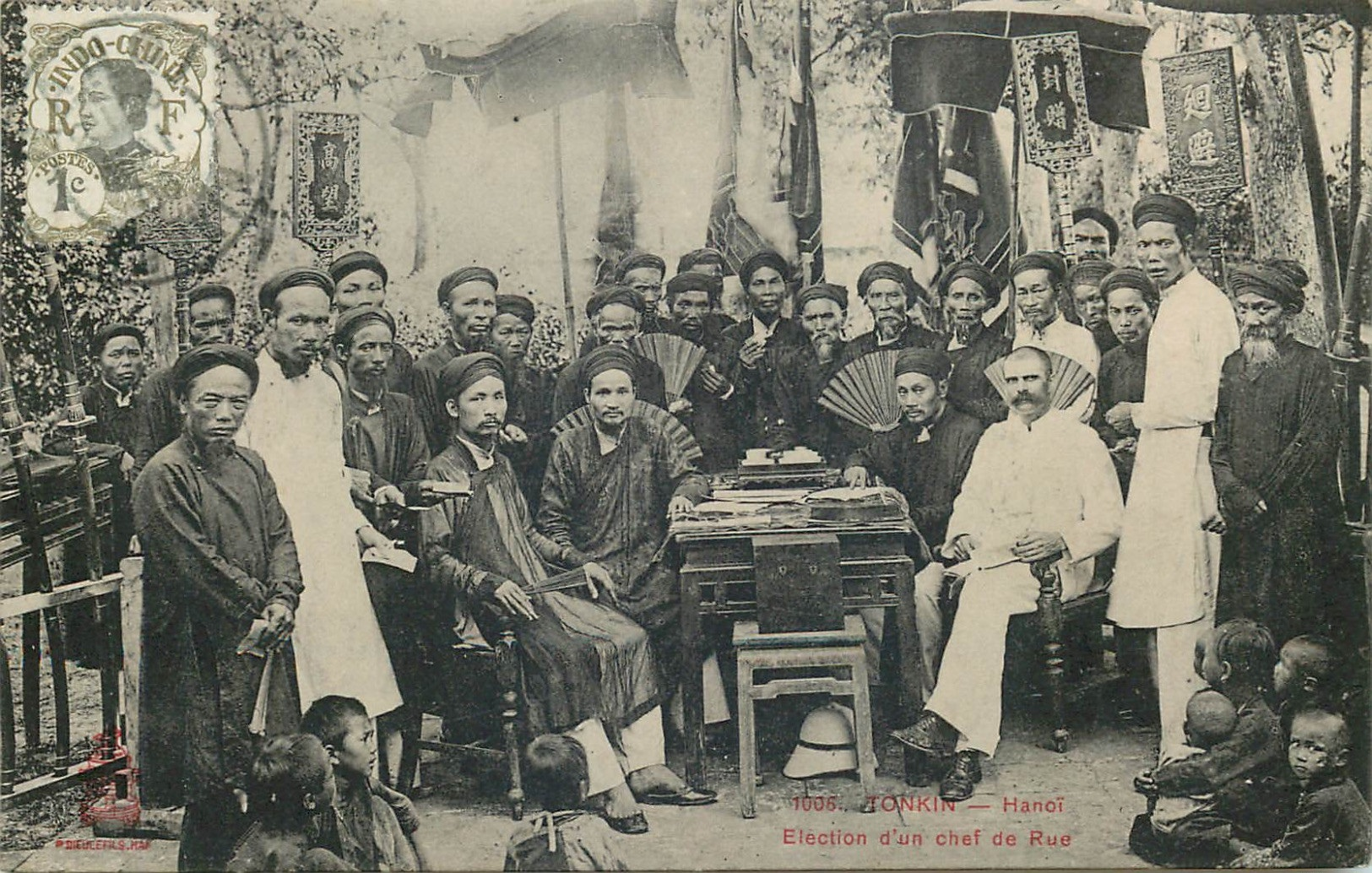
Hanoi around 1910

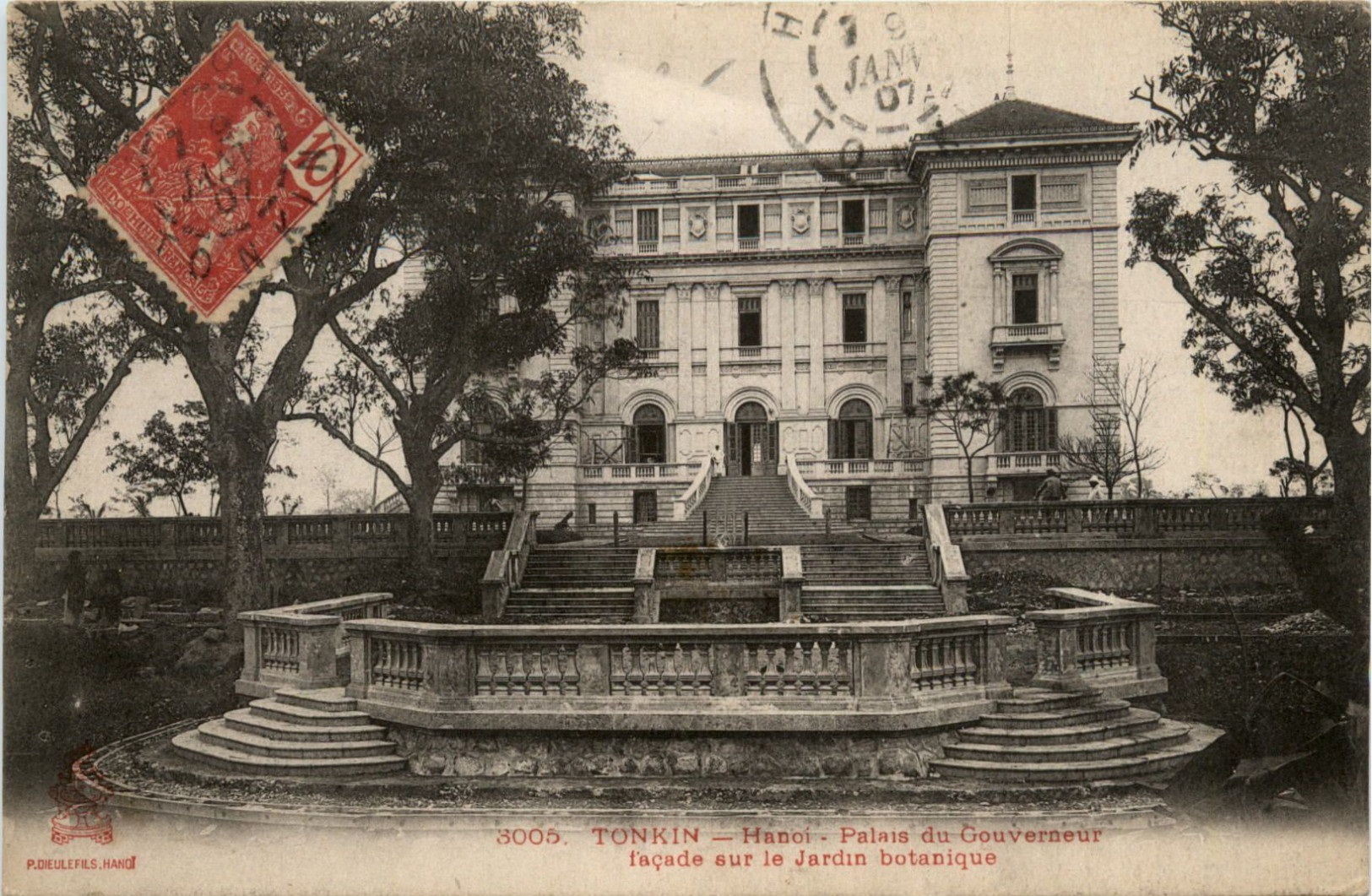
The French General Gouvernor's Palace in Hanoi

== Trivia ==
The American mid-20th-century musical drama South Pacific includes a duet by the lead couple. It describes their nostalgia for their respective lives in the United States; their exposure to use of the Tonkinese dialect seems to stand out, among the particulars of their displacement from their respective roots.

== See also ==
- Cochinchina
- Gulf of Tonkin
- Jiaozhi
- Names of Vietnam
- North Vietnam
- Northern, Central and Southern Vietnam
- Tokyo, as the Meiji restoration renamed Edo in 1868, with a similar meaning.
