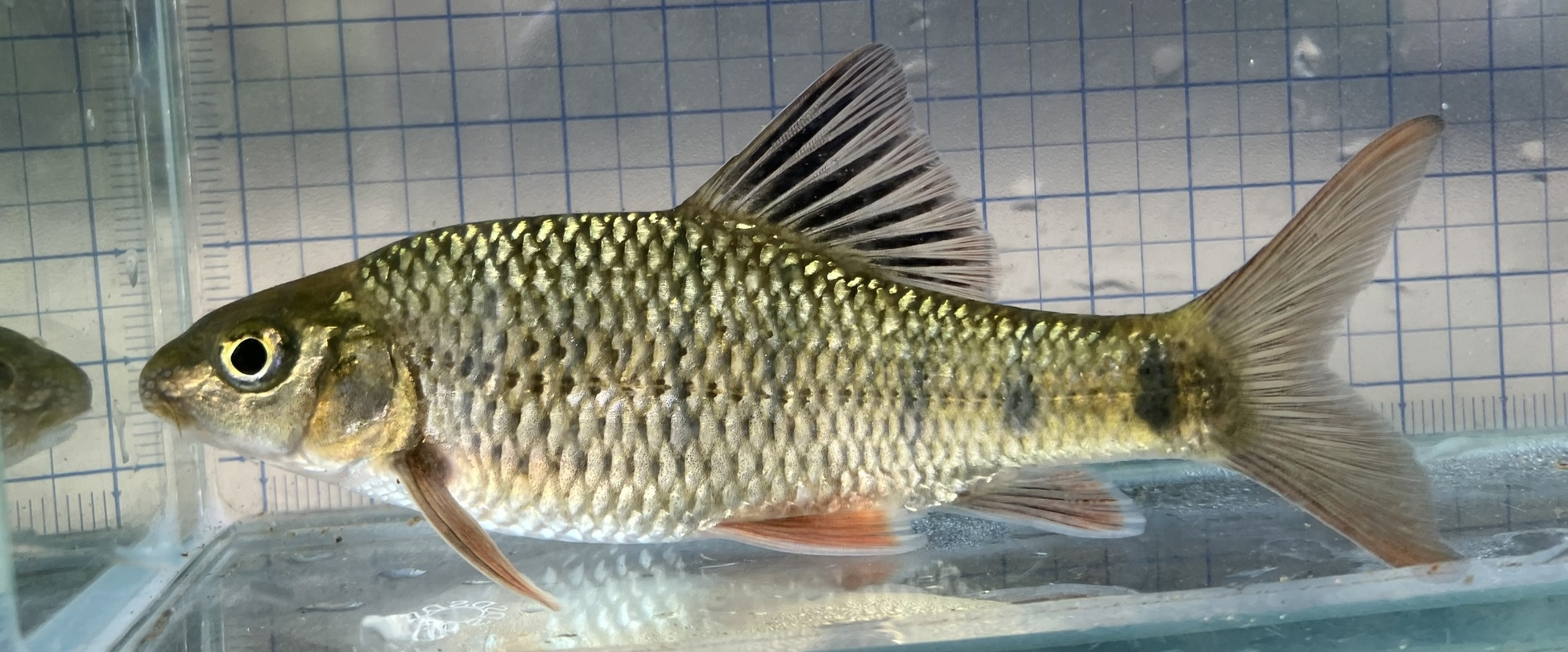
- Acrossocheilus paradoxus

Scientific classification
- Kingdom: Animalia
- Phylum: Chordata
- Class: Actinopterygii
- Order: Cypriniformes
- Family: Cyprinidae
- Subfamily: Acrossocheilinae
- Genus: Acrossocheilus; Ōshima, 1919

Type species
- Gymnostomus formosanus Regan, 1908

Synonyms
- Lissochilichthys Oshima, 1919

= Acrossocheilus =

Genus of fishes

Acrossocheilus is a genus of ray-finned fish in the family Cyprinidae, native to freshwater habitats in China, Taiwan, Laos, and Vietnam. Fishes in this genus are fairly small, with no species surpassing 30 cm (1 ft) in standard length.

== Species ==
There are currently 16 recognized species in this genus, as listed below. Previously, this genus contained many more species, but some have been shown to be mere synonyms, and others have been moved to Neolissochilus, Poropuntius, Onychostoma and Masticbarbus in recent years.

- Acrossocheilus beijiangensis Wu & Lin 1977
- Acrossocheilus clivosius (Lin, 1935)
- Acrossocheilus dabieensis Chen & Zhao, 2025
- Acrossocheilus fasciatus (Steindachner, 1892)
- Acrossocheilus furongjiangensis Xiao, 2024
- Acrossocheilus hemispinus (Nichols, 1925)
- Acrossocheilus ikedai (Harada, 1943)
- Acrossocheilus jishouensis Zhao, Chen & Li, 1997
- Acrossocheilus kreyenbergii (Regan, 1908)
- Acrossocheilus labiatus (Regan, 1908)
- Acrossocheilus multistriatus Lan, Chan & Zhao, 2014
- Acrossocheilus paradoxus (Günther, 1868)
- Acrossocheilus parallens (Nichols, 1931)
- Acrossocheilus rendahli (Lin, 1931)
- Acrossocheilus spinifer Yuan, Wu & Zhang, 2006
- Acrossocheilus wenchowensis Wang, 1935

Additionally, the following two binomials, each formerly representing a species of Acrossocheilus, have now been put into another binomial's synonymy by the Catalog of Fishes:

- Acrossocheilus lamus (Mai, 1978) (now deemed as a synonym of Masticbarbus microstoma (Pellegrin & Chevey, 1936))
- Acrossocheilus malacopterus Zhang, 2005 (now deemed as a synonym of Angustistoma barbatum (Lin, 1931))
