= Acrossocheilus multistriatus =

Scientific classification
- Kingdom: Animalia
- Phylum: Chordata
- Class: Actinopterygii
- Order: Cypriniformes
- Family: Cyprinidae
- Subfamily: Acrossocheilinae
- Genus: Acrossocheilus
- Species: A. multistriatus

Binomial name
- Acrossocheilus multistriatus Lan, Chan & Zhao, 2014

Species of fish

Acrossocheilus multistriatus is a species of ray-finned fish in the genus Acrossocheilus. It is endemic to China, where it inhabits the Huaping National Nature Reserve in Guangxi. It has a maximum length of about 11.7 cm (4.6 in).
