= Hồng Lĩnh Mountains =

Mountain range in Vietnam

Hồng Lĩnh
- Ngàn Hống; Rú Hống
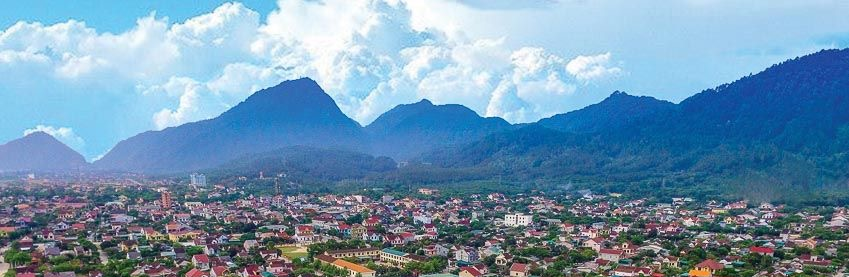
- Núi Hồng Lĩnh

Highest point
- Elevation: 200–1,000 m (660–3,280 ft)
- Listing: List of mountains in Vietnam
- Coordinates: 18°33′29″N 105°47′20″E

Geography
- Location within Vietnam
- Location: Vietnam

Hồng Lĩnh (Chữ Hán: 鴻嶺) is a mountain range in Hà Tĩnh Province, Vietnam.

== Etymology ==
From the modern perspective, its name Hồng-lĩnh (national voice) or Hông-lịnh (local voice) is often understood as "the red river". For example : "O my Ha-tịnh, the blue river is reflecting the red mountain". However, this is the wrong way of interpreting, which is derived from the signing in Hanese characters.

Before the 19th century, this area still used indigenous languages to call the addresses in it. According to that nature, the mountainous area is called as rú Hống or ngàn Hống roughly by the locals. This is a word that is now lost, which means "the mountains of the phoenixs".

Because according to the legend of the Laotian nation, this mountainous area is where the ten paradise princesses have come to the sông Rung to bathe. However, the magic shirt of the youngest princess was robbed by a woodcutter, so she stayed with the mortal. That is why there are 9 peaks today.

== History ==
The mountains famously have 99 peaks. Nguyễn Huệ built the Trung Đô Citadel on Hồng Lĩnh mountain. The mountains were the place of retirement of Nguyễn Du. In earlier days villagers went into the Hồng Lĩnh mountains at times of poor crops for hunting and harvesting rattan and leaves to make raincoats and hats. Hồng Lĩnh Mountain is now suffering ecological damage from people harvesting mật nhân (Eurycoma longifolia).

== See also ==
- Lam river
