= Acrossocheilus longipinnis =

Scientific classification
- Kingdom: Animalia
- Phylum: Chordata
- Class: Actinopterygii
- Order: Cypriniformes
- Family: Cyprinidae
- Genus: Acrossocheilus
- Species: A. longipinnis

Binomial name
- Acrossocheilus longipinnis Wu, 1939

Synonyms
- Acrossocheilus iridescens longipinnis (Wu, 1939); Acrossocheilus iridescens zhujiangensis Wu & Lin, 1977; Acrossocheilus stenotaeniatus Chu & Cui, 1989; Lissochilus longipinnis Wu, 1939; Masticbarbus pentafasciatus Tang, 1942

Species of fish

Acrossocheilus longipinnis is a species of cyprinid fish from the Pearl River basin in southern China.

== Taxonomy ==
This fish was placed in the genus Acrossocheilus and treated as a subspecies of M. iridescens (then known as Acrossocheilus iridescens), but a 2012 study supported the separation of the two subspecies.

Its genome has been sequenced.

== Description ==
Acrossocheilus longipinnis reaches at least 38 cm (15 in) in length. Juveniles are pale yellowish with 5–6 narrow dark bars on the flanks, but in adults over 11 cm (4.3 in) in standard length, the dark bars are much wider. This species can be distinguished from M. iridescens by looking at the first branched dorsal-fin ray, which is extended as a filament in this species and not extended in M. iridescens.
