= Acrossocheilus clivosius =

Conservation status
- Data Deficient (IUCN 3.1)

Scientific classification
- Kingdom: Animalia
- Phylum: Chordata
- Class: Actinopterygii
- Order: Cypriniformes
- Family: Cyprinidae
- Subfamily: Acrossocheilinae
- Genus: Acrossocheilus
- Species: A. clivosius

Binomial name
- Acrossocheilus clivosius (S. Y. Lin, 1935)

Synonyms
- Lissochilus clivosius Lin, 1935; Lissochilus laocaiensis Nguyen & Doan, 1969

Species of fish

Acrossocheilus clivosius is a species of ray-finned fish in the genus Acrossocheilus from southern China and northern Vietnam.
