= Acrossocheilus rendahli =

Conservation status
- Near Threatened (IUCN 3.1)

Scientific classification
- Kingdom: Animalia
- Phylum: Chordata
- Class: Actinopterygii
- Order: Cypriniformes
- Family: Cyprinidae
- Genus: Acrossocheilus
- Species: A. rendahli

Binomial name
- Acrossocheilus rendahli (S. Y. Lin, 1931)

Synonyms
- Barbus rendahli Lin, 1931

Species of fish

Acrossocheilus rendahli is a species of ray-finned fish in the genus Acrossocheilus from southern China and northern Vietnam.
