= Masticbarbus iridescens =

Conservation status
- Data Deficient (IUCN 3.1)

Scientific classification
- Kingdom: Animalia
- Phylum: Chordata
- Class: Actinopterygii
- Order: Cypriniformes
- Family: Cyprinidae
- Subfamily: Acrossocheilinae
- Genus: Masticbarbus
- Species: M. iridescens

Binomial name
- Masticbarbus iridescens (Nichols & Pope, 1927)

Synonyms
- Acrossocheilus iridescens (Nichols & Pope, 1927); Barbus barbodon Nichols & Pope, 1927; Barbus paradoxus quinquefasciatus Koller, 1927; Cyclocheilichthys iridescens Nichols & Pope, 1927

Species of fish

Masticbarbus iridescens is a species of freshwater cyprinid fish native to southeastern China, northern Laos and northern Vietnam. It reaches up to 29.7 cm (11.7 in) in standard length. Juveniles are pale yellowish with 5–6 narrow dark bars; these become much broader when they reach adulthood. Formerly, some considered M. longipinnis to be a subspecies of this species, but recent authorities recognize them as separate.
