= Acrossocheilus ikedai =

Conservation status
- Endangered (IUCN 3.1)

Scientific classification
- Kingdom: Animalia
- Phylum: Chordata
- Class: Actinopterygii
- Order: Cypriniformes
- Family: Cyprinidae
- Genus: Acrossocheilus
- Species: A. ikedai

Binomial name
- Acrossocheilus ikedai (Harada, 1943)

Synonyms
- Lissochilus ikedai Harada, 1943; Poropuntius ikedai (Harada, 1943)

Species of fish

Acrossocheilus ikedai is a species of ray-finned fish in the genus Acrossocheilus. It is endemic to China, where it inhabits the Yangtze river system in Hainan. It has a maximum length of about 10.7 cm (4.2 in).
