= Acrossocheilus fasciatus =

Conservation status
- Least Concern (IUCN 3.1)

Scientific classification
- Kingdom: Animalia
- Phylum: Chordata
- Class: Actinopterygii
- Order: Cypriniformes
- Family: Cyprinidae
- Genus: Acrossocheilus
- Species: A. fasciatus

Binomial name
- Acrossocheilus fasciatus (Steindachner, 1892)

Synonyms
- Crossochilus fasciatus Steindachner, 1892

Species of fish

Acrossocheilus fasciatus is a species of cyprinid fish. It inhabits mountain streams of southeast China. It matures at an age of 2–3 years, has a lifespan of about 4–5 years, and maximum length of about 19.2 cm (7.6 in).
