= Folifer =

Conservation status
- Data Deficient (IUCN 3.1)

Scientific classification
- Kingdom: Animalia
- Phylum: Chordata
- Class: Actinopterygii
- Order: Cypriniformes
- Family: Cyprinidae
- Subfamily: Acrossocheilinae
- Genus: Folifer; H. W. Wu, 1977
- Species: F. brevifilis

Binomial name
- Folifer brevifilis (W. K. H. Peters, 1881)

Synonyms
- Barbus brevifilis Peters, 1881; Labeobarbus brevifilis (Peters, 1881); Tor brevifilis (Peters, 1881); Barbus bonvaloti Vaillant, 1893; Barbus szechwanensis Tchang, 1931; Barbus longirostrum Kimura, 1934

Genus of fish

Folifer is a monospecific genus of brackish and freshwater ray-finned fish belonging to the Cyprinidae family (which comprises carps, minnows and related fishes). The only species in the genus is Folifer brevifilis, a fish widely distributed throughout Southeast Asia and southern China, including Hainan.

It is found in the middle and lower parts of flowing rivers where there is clear and open water, though it is not found in still water. The diet of this fish consists of molluscs, crustaceans, insect larvae, algae and organic debris. It attains sexual maturity after two years, and spawns over stony riverbeds in areas of clear and open water. The species has a maximum total length of 40.5 cm (15.9 in), although a standard length of 19.2 cm (7.6 in) is more typical. F. brevifilis is valued as food, but is not fished in large quantities. It is unknown whether the species is migratory.

Some authorities consider there to be three separate species, with Folifer hainanesis in Hainan and Folifer yunnanensis in Yunnan.
