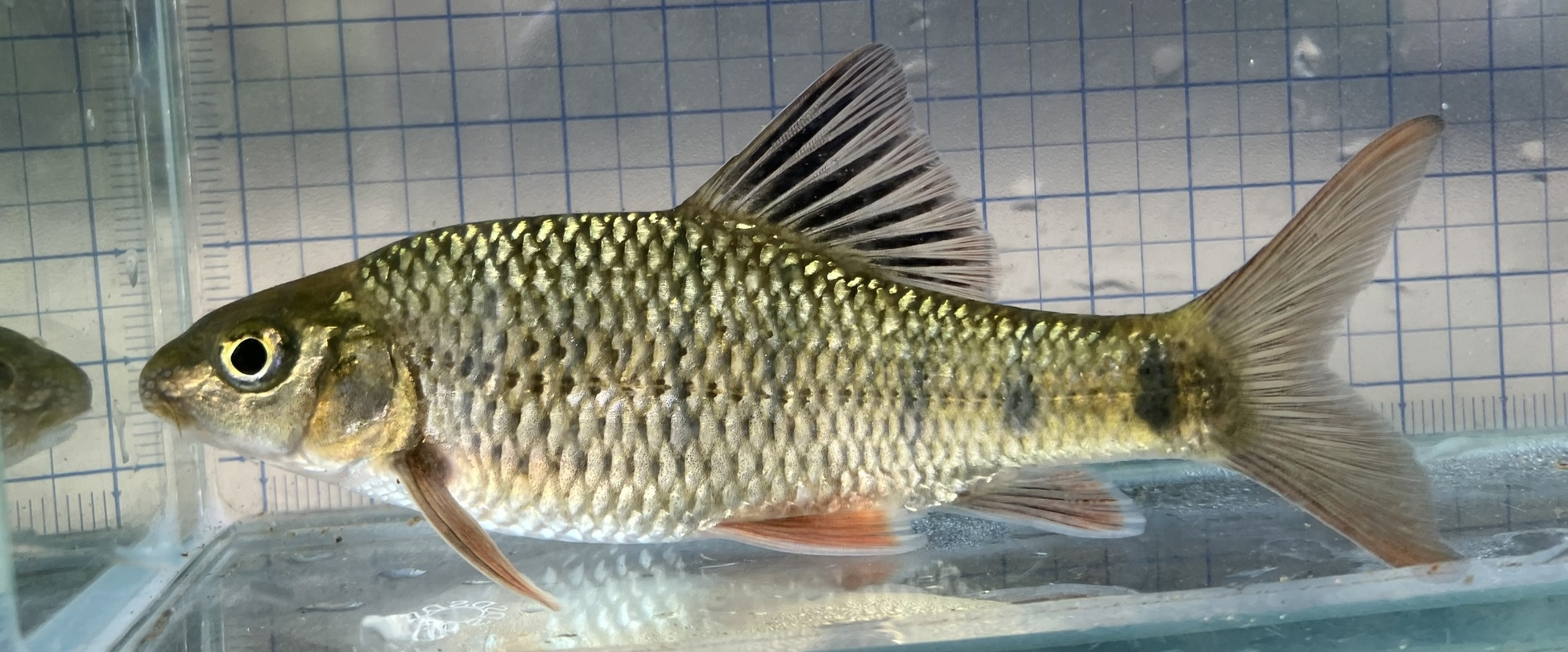

Scientific classification
- Kingdom: Animalia
- Phylum: Chordata
- Class: Actinopterygii
- Order: Cypriniformes
- Family: Cyprinidae
- Subfamily: Acrossocheilinae
- Genus: Acrossocheilus
- Species: A. paradoxus

Binomial name
- Acrossocheilus paradoxus (Günther, 1868)

Synonyms
- Gymnostomus formosanus Regan, 1908; Acrossocheilus formosanus (Regan, 1908); Gymnostomus labiatus Regan, 1908; Acrossocheilus labiatus (Regan, 1908)

= Acrossocheilus paradoxus =

Species of fish

Acrossocheilus paradoxus is a species of ray-finned fish in the genus Acrossocheilus from Taiwan and China. It is used for food and kept as an ornamental fish.
