= Cả River =

River in Laos and Vietnam

Coordinates: 18.7600°N 105.7600°E

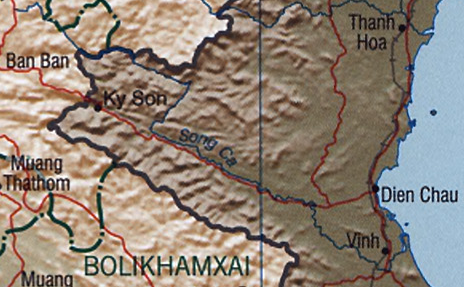
Lam River.

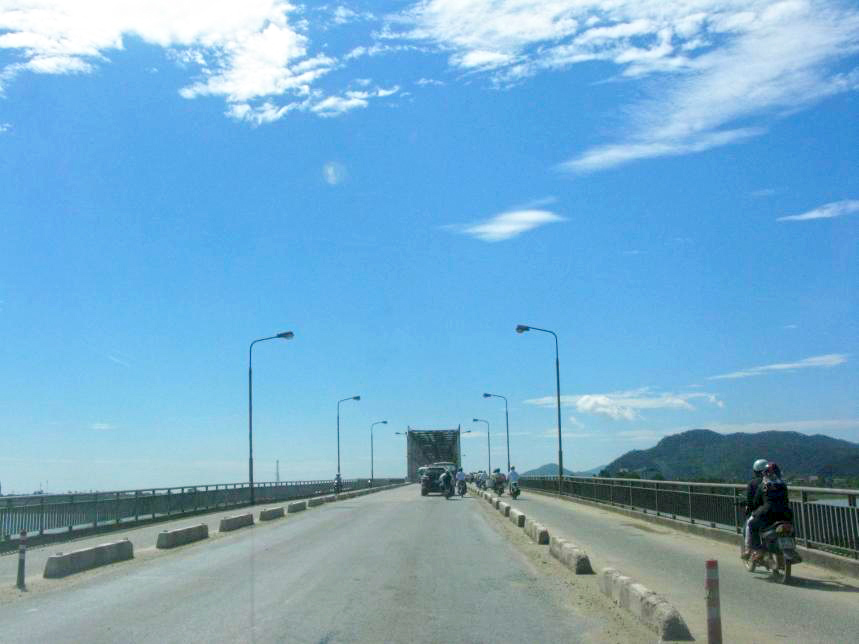
Ben Thuy Bridge crossover Cả River.

The Cả River (Laotian: Nam Khan, Vietnamese: Sông Cả) or better known as Lam River (sông Lam in Vietnamese) is a river in mainland Southeast Asia.

== Etymology ==
Its name Cả means "first" or "great" in Vietnamese language. Its other name Lam is Sino-Vietnamese reflex of Middle Chinese *lɑm (chữ Hán: 藍), meaning "blue, indigo".

== History ==
It originates in the Loi Mountains of Laos, crossing Laos's Xiangkhouang Province, Vietnam's Nghệ An and Hà Tĩnh provinces and empties into the Gulf of Tonkin, on the North Central Coast of Vietnam, after a 512 km journey. The Cả River zone is classified as 300 km by the Vietnam Geographical Survey. The Bến Thủy bridge, crossing into Bến Thủy, Vinh, crosses the Cả River on its Cửa Hội estuary.

== See also ==
- Hong mountain
