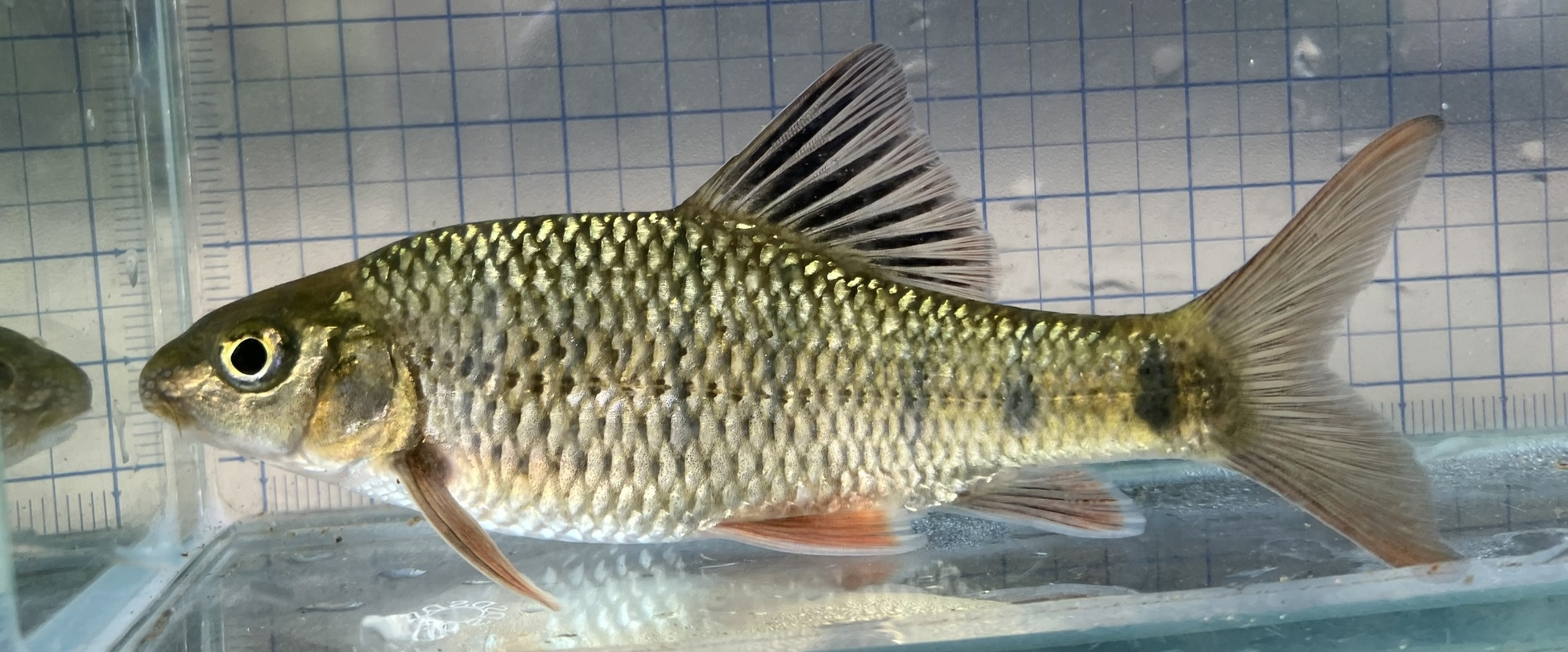
- Acrossocheilus paradoxus

Scientific classification
- Kingdom: Animalia
- Phylum: Chordata
- Class: Actinopterygii
- Order: Cypriniformes
- Family: Cyprinidae
- Subfamily: Acrossocheilinae; Yang et al., 2015

= Acrossocheilinae =

Subfamily of fishes

Acrossocheilinae is a subfamily of freshwater ray-finned fish in the family Cyprinidae (carps, minnows and allies), containing several genera found in Southeast Asia and China. This taxon was originally proposed as a tribe (as Acrossocheilini) by Yang et al. in 2015, but with the reclassification of the former subfamilies of Cyprinidae sensu lato into families, this taxon was accordingly elevated to subfamily rank.

== Genera ==
According to the Catalog of Fishes, Acrossicheilinae currently contains the following genera:

- Acrossocheilus Ōshima, 1919
- Angustistoma Hoàng, 2025
- Folifer Wu, 1977
- Hongiastoma Hoàng & Nguyễn, 2025
- Masticbarbus Tang, 1942
- Onychostoma Günther, 1896
- Scaphesthes Ōshima, 1919
- Scaphostoma Hoàng & Phạm, 2025
