= Gobiobotia cheni =

Scientific classification
- Kingdom: Animalia
- Phylum: Chordata
- Class: Actinopterygii
- Order: Cypriniformes
- Suborder: Cyprinoidei
- Family: Gobionidae
- Genus: Gobiobotia
- Species: G. cheni

Binomial name
- Gobiobotia cheni Bănărescu & Nalbant, 1966

Species of freshwater fish from Taiwan

Gobiobotia cheni is a species of small freshwater ray-finned fish belonging to the family Gobionidae, the gudgeons. It is endemic to Taiwan.

Named in honor of vertebrate zoologist Jianshen ("Johnson") T. F. Chen (1898–1988), Director, National Taiwan Museum (Taipei), who provided type specimens.
