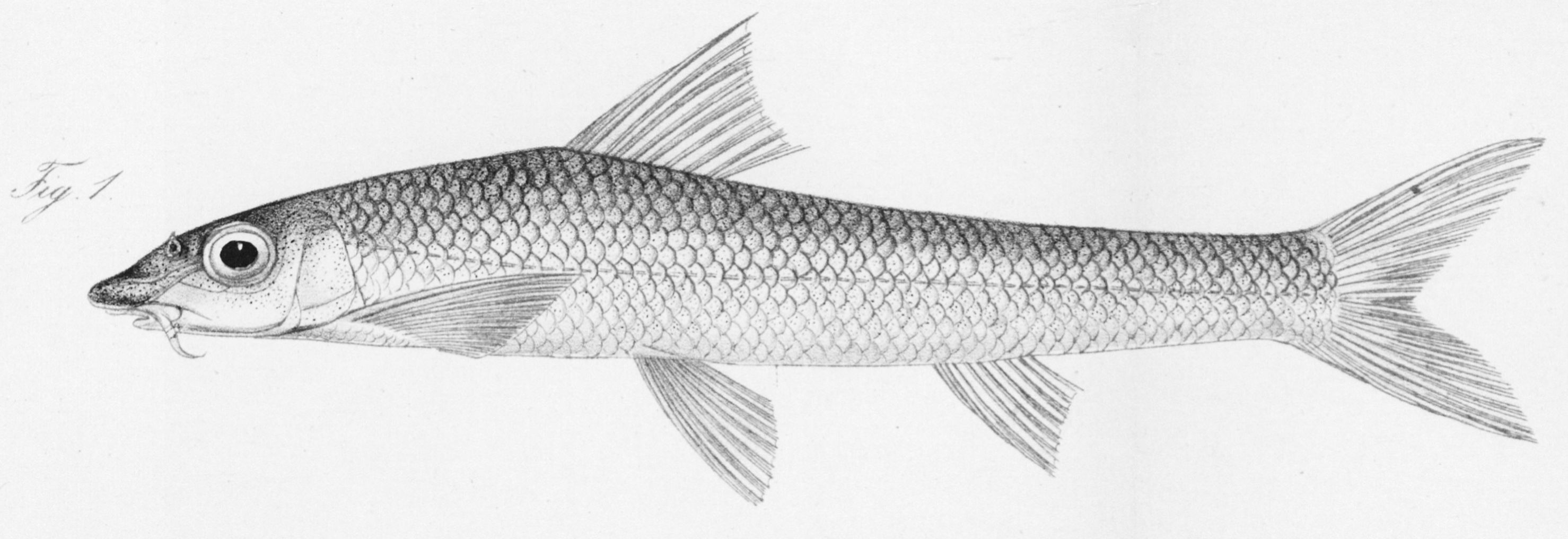

Scientific classification
- Kingdom: Animalia
- Phylum: Chordata
- Class: Actinopterygii
- Order: Cypriniformes
- Suborder: Cyprinoidei
- Family: Gobionidae
- Genus: Rhinogobio
- Species: R. typus

Binomial name
- Rhinogobio typus Bleeker, 1871

= Rhinogobio typus =

Species of fish

Rhinogobio typus is a species of freshwater ray-finned fish belonging to the family Gobionidae, the gudgeons. It is endemic to China.

It can grow to 49 cm (19 in) total length and weigh up to 1.1 kg (2.4 lb).
