= Coreius septentrionalis =

Conservation status
- Critically Endangered (IUCN 3.1)

Scientific classification
- Kingdom: Animalia
- Phylum: Chordata
- Class: Actinopterygii
- Order: Cypriniformes
- Suborder: Cyprinoidei
- Family: Gobionidae
- Genus: Coreius
- Species: C. septentrionalis

Binomial name
- Coreius septentrionalis (Nichols, 1925)

Synonyms
- Coripareius septentrionalis Nichols, 1925; Coreius longibarbus Mori, 1928

Species of fish

Coreius septentrionalis is a species of ray-finned fish in the genus Coreius endemic to the Yellow River in China.
