= Gobiobotia kolleri =

Conservation status
- Data Deficient (IUCN 3.1)

Scientific classification
- Kingdom: Animalia
- Phylum: Chordata
- Class: Actinopterygii
- Order: Cypriniformes
- Suborder: Cyprinoidei
- Family: Gobionidae
- Genus: Gobiobotia
- Species: G. kolleri

Binomial name
- Gobiobotia kolleri Bănărescu & Nalbant, 1966

Species of freshwater fish from Asia

Gobiobotia kolleri is a species of small freshwater ray-finned fish belonging to the family Gobionidae, the gudgeons. It is endemic to Hainan and Vietnam.

Named in honor of the late Otto Koller, Naturhistorisches Museum Wien, the first ichthyologist to examine specimens in 1927 on which species is based.
