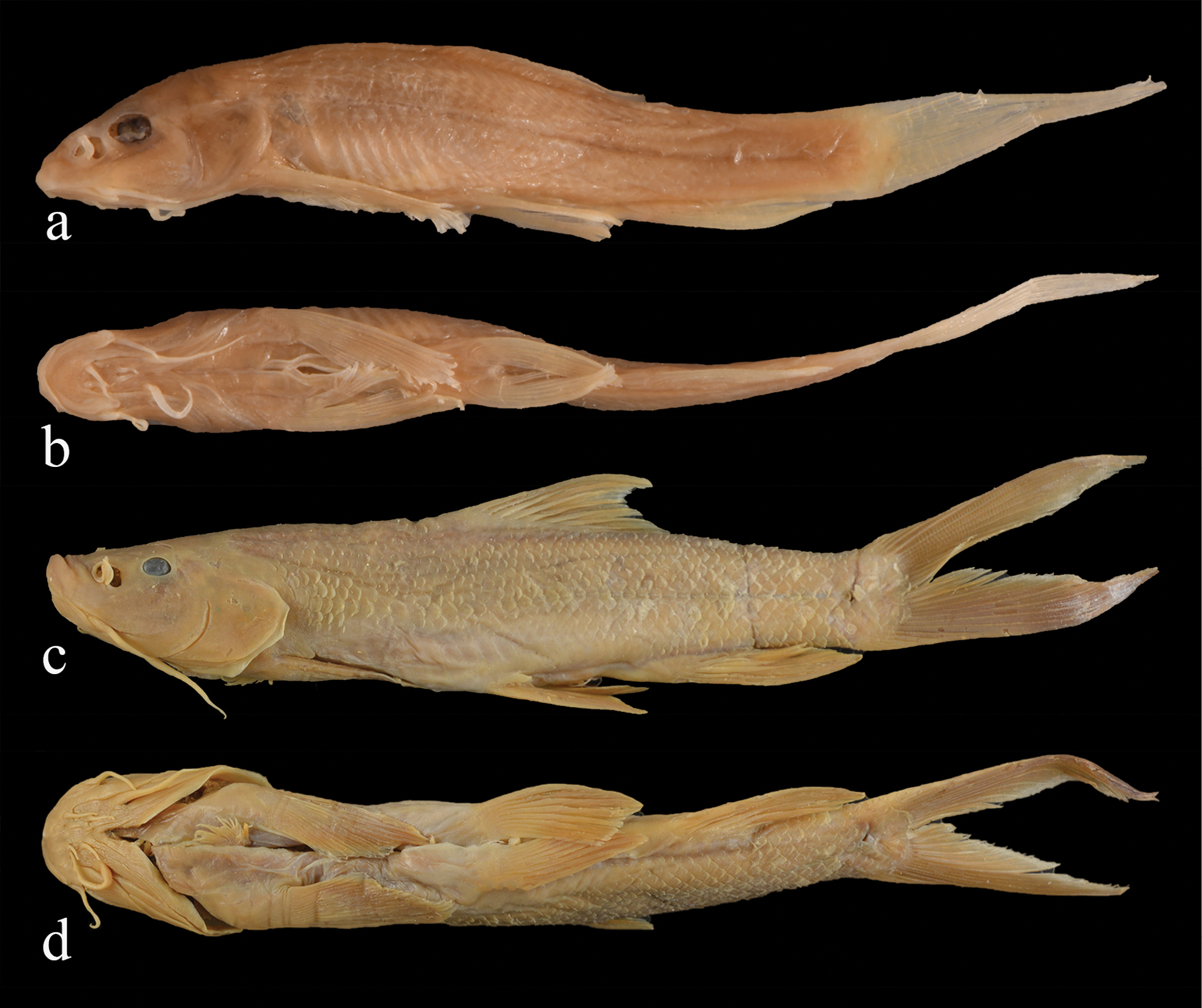

Scientific classification
- Kingdom: Animalia
- Phylum: Chordata
- Class: Actinopterygii
- Order: Cypriniformes
- Suborder: Cyprinoidei
- Family: Gobionidae
- Genus: Xenophysogobio
- Species: X. boulengeri

Binomial name
- Xenophysogobio boulengeri (T. L. Tchang, 1929)

Synonyms
- Gobiobotia boulengeri T. L. Tchang, 1929

= Xenophysogobio boulengeri =

Species of fish

Xenophysogobio boulengeri is a species of freshwater ray-finned fish belonging to the family Gobionidae, the gudgeons. This species of gudgeon is endemic to China.

Named in honor of George A. Boulenger (1858–1937), who provided "some guidance" (translation) in the completion of Tchang's paper.
