= Gobio lingyuanensis =

Scientific classification
- Kingdom: Animalia
- Phylum: Chordata
- Class: Actinopterygii
- Order: Cypriniformes
- Suborder: Cyprinoidei
- Family: Gobionidae
- Genus: Gobio
- Species: G. lingyuanensis

Binomial name
- Gobio lingyuanensis Mori, 1934

Species of fish

Gobio lingyuanensis is a species of gudgeon, a small freshwater ray-finned fish in the family Gobionidae. It is found in the Dalinhe, Lanhe, and Shonghuajiang rivers in China.
