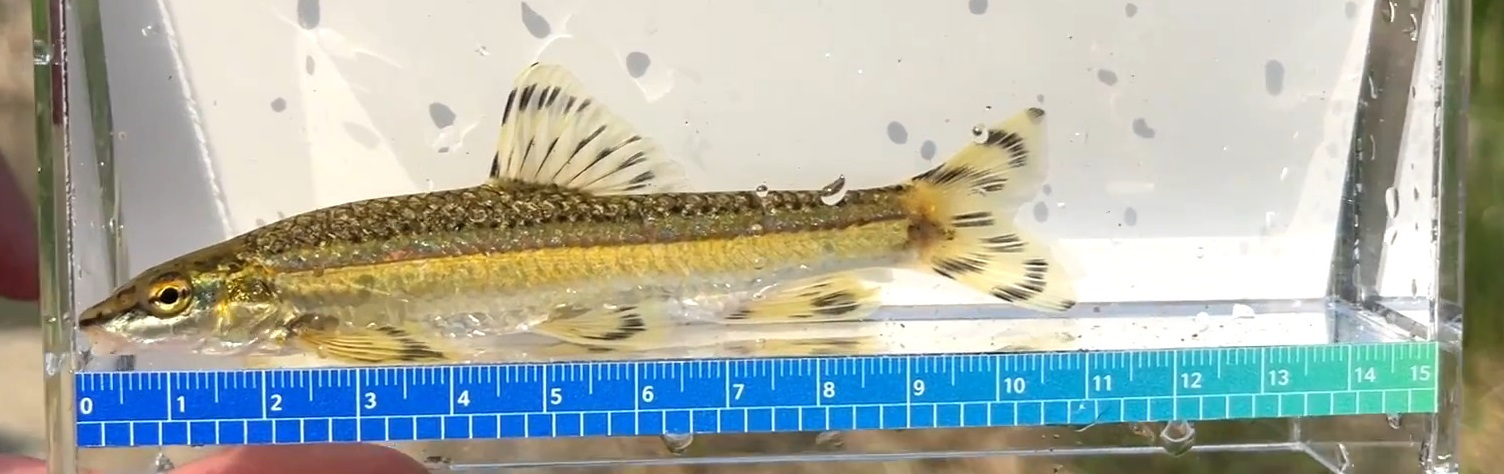

Scientific classification
- Kingdom: Animalia
- Phylum: Chordata
- Class: Actinopterygii
- Division: Teleostei
- Order: Cypriniformes
- Suborder: Cyprinoidei
- Family: Gobionidae
- Genus: Coreoleuciscus
- Species: C. splendidus

Binomial name
- Coreoleuciscus splendidus T. Mori, 1935

= Coreoleuciscus splendidus =

Korean splendid dace

Species of fish

Coreoleuciscus splendidus, also known as the swiri or Korean splendid dace, is a species of fish from the cyprinid family endemic to rivers of the Korean Peninsula. It was first scientifically described by Tamezo Mori in 1935, who noted in 1936 that it could be found spawning in North Gyeongsang Province's Uljin County; a 1939 study also found it in the Geum and Seomjin rivers. A South Korean survey of 4909 sites south of the Korean Demilitarized Zone conducted between April 1966 and November 1989 found it in 659 sites; it was not seen to appear in the Yeongsan, Sapgyo, or Anseong rivers. It typically spawns between the beginning of May and the middle of June.

Coreoleuciscus splendidus grows to roughly 10 to 15 cm in length, with a long, slender body and a pointed snout; its eyes are small and horseshoe-shaped. Its head is greyish-brown in colour, while its back is darker and its stomach is lighter, often approaching white in hue; it also has a light stripe running along the length of its body on each side. The stripe is typically yellow, though specimens with orange stripes can also be found and are considered to be more attractive. It is often used for decorative purposes; feeding it sources of carotenoids, specifically spirulina or paprika, has been observed to improve the colour definition of its skin and fins.

== In popular culture ==
The 1999 South Korean film Shiri was named after C. splendidus; the fish appears prominently in tanks in the offices of the main characters, and one of the film's primary antagonists has a monologue which discusses the fish and the effect that the division of Korea has had on it.
