= Auvergne gudgeon =

Conservation status
- Least Concern (IUCN 3.1)

Scientific classification
- Kingdom: Animalia
- Phylum: Chordata
- Class: Actinopterygii
- Order: Cypriniformes
- Suborder: Cyprinoidei
- Family: Gobionidae
- Genus: Gobio
- Species: G. alverniae

Binomial name
- Gobio alverniae Kottelat & Persat, 2005

Species of fish

The Auvergne gudgeon (Gobio alverniae) is a species of gudgeon, a small freshwater ray-finned fish in the family Gobionidae. It is found in the upper Loire, Dordogne, Lot and Tarn drainages in France.
