= Salgir gudgeon =

Conservation status
- Vulnerable (IUCN 3.1)

Scientific classification
- Kingdom: Animalia
- Phylum: Chordata
- Class: Actinopterygii
- Order: Cypriniformes
- Suborder: Cyprinoidei
- Family: Gobionidae
- Genus: Gobio
- Species: G. krymensis

Binomial name
- Gobio krymensis Bănărescu & Nalbant, 1973

Synonyms
- Gobio gobio krymensis Banarescu & Nalbant, 1973

Species of fish

The Salgir gudgeon (Gobio krymensis) is a species of gudgeon, a small freshwater ray-finned fish in the family Gobionidae. It is widespread in Europe in rivers Salgir, Alma, and Bel Bek drainages (southern Crimea) in Ukraine. It is a freshwater demersal fish, up to 11.0 cm long.
