= Gobio kizilirmakensis =

Scientific classification
- Kingdom: Animalia
- Phylum: Chordata
- Class: Actinopterygii
- Order: Cypriniformes
- Suborder: Cyprinoidei
- Family: Gobionidae
- Genus: Gobio
- Species: G. kizilirmakensis

Binomial name
- Gobio kizilirmakensis Turan, Japoshvili, Aksu & Bektaş, 2016

Species of fish

Gobio kizilirmakensis is a species of gudgeon, a small freshwater ray-finned fish in the family Gobionidae, native to the Kızılırmak River basin in Turkey.

== Description ==
Gobio kizilirmakensis distinguishes itself from others of its genus and region by bearing several distinct features: small scales on its belly; head length of around 27% SL; rounded snout; notably large mouth gape; preanal length of around 70% SL; prepelvic length of around 50% SL; caudal peduncle length about 2.5 times its depth; and 8-9 midlateral black blotches, among other features.

It is a benthopelagic species, which thrives in freshwater, subtropical climates. It is most commonly found in Asia; native particularly to the Anatolia region.
