= Gobio volgensis =

Conservation status
- Least Concern (IUCN 3.1)

Scientific classification
- Kingdom: Animalia
- Phylum: Chordata
- Class: Actinopterygii
- Order: Cypriniformes
- Suborder: Cyprinoidei
- Family: Gobionidae
- Genus: Gobio
- Species: G. volgensis

Binomial name
- Gobio volgensis Vasil'eva, Mendel, Vasil'ev, Lusk & Lusková, 2008

Species of fish

Gobio volgensis is a species of gudgeon, a small freshwater ray-finned fish in the family Gobionidae. It is endemic to the Volga River basin in Russia..
