= Don gudgeon =

Conservation status
- Least Concern (IUCN 3.1)

Scientific classification
- Kingdom: Animalia
- Phylum: Chordata
- Class: Actinopterygii
- Order: Cypriniformes
- Suborder: Cyprinoidei
- Family: Gobionidae
- Genus: Gobio
- Species: G. brevicirris

Binomial name
- Gobio brevicirris Fowler, 1976

Synonyms
- Gobio gobio brevicirris Fowler, 1976; Gobio gobio morpha brevicirris Berg, 1914

Species of fish

The Don gudgeon (Gobio brevicirris) is a species of gudgeon, a small freshwater fish in the family Gobionidae. It is widespread in Europe in the Don River system in Russia and Ukraine. It is a freshwater demersal fish, up to 10 cm long.
