= Gobiobotia brevirostris =

Scientific classification
- Kingdom: Animalia
- Phylum: Chordata
- Class: Actinopterygii
- Order: Cypriniformes
- Suborder: Cyprinoidei
- Family: Gobionidae
- Genus: Gobiobotia
- Species: G. brevirostris

Binomial name
- Gobiobotia brevirostris Yi-Yu Chen & W. H. Cao, 1977

Species of fish

Gobiobotia brevirostris is a species of small freshwater ray-finned fish belonging to the family Gobionidae, the gudgeons. It is found in the Baihe and Xihe rivers in China.
