= Gobio huanghensis =

Scientific classification
- Kingdom: Animalia
- Phylum: Chordata
- Class: Actinopterygii
- Order: Cypriniformes
- Suborder: Cyprinoidei
- Family: Gobionidae
- Genus: Gobio
- Species: G. huanghensis

Binomial name
- Gobio huanghensis Luo, Le & Chen, 1977

Species of fish

Gobio huanghensis is a species of gudgeon, a small freshwater ray-finned fish in the family Gobionidae. It is found in the middle and upper reaches of the Yangtze in China.
