= Saurogobio immaculatus =

Conservation status
- Data Deficient (IUCN 3.1)

Scientific classification
- Kingdom: Animalia
- Phylum: Chordata
- Class: Actinopterygii
- Order: Cypriniformes
- Suborder: Cyprinoidei
- Family: Gobionidae
- Genus: Saurogobio
- Species: S. immaculatus

Binomial name
- Saurogobio immaculatus Koller, 1927

Synonyms
- Saurogobio dabryi immaculatus Koller, 1927; Saurogobio dabryi vietnamensis Đ. Y. Mai, 1978

Species of fish

Saurogobio immaculatus is a species of freshwater ray-finned fish belonging to the family Gobionidae, the gudgeons. This fish is found in China and Vietnam.
