= Gobio occitaniae =

Conservation status
- Least Concern (IUCN 3.1)

Scientific classification
- Kingdom: Animalia
- Phylum: Chordata
- Class: Actinopterygii
- Order: Cypriniformes
- Suborder: Cyprinoidei
- Family: Gobionidae
- Genus: Gobio
- Species: G. occitaniae

Binomial name
- Gobio occitaniae Kottelat & Persat, 2005

Species of fish

Gobio occitaniae, the Languedoc gudgeon, is a species of gudgeon, a small freshwater ray-finned fish in the family Gobionidae. It is found in Mediterranean drainages to Mediterranean between Rhône and Pyrénées in Andorra, France, and Spain.
