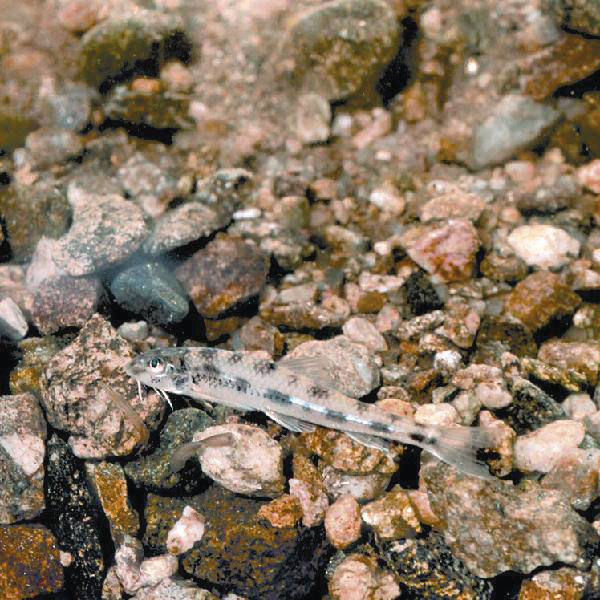

Conservation status
- Critically Endangered (IUCN 3.1)

Scientific classification
- Kingdom: Animalia
- Phylum: Chordata
- Class: Actinopterygii
- Order: Cypriniformes
- Suborder: Cyprinoidei
- Family: Gobionidae
- Genus: Gobiobotia
- Species: G. naktongensis

Binomial name
- Gobiobotia naktongensis Mori, 1935

= Gobiobotia naktongensis =

Species of freshwater fish from Korea

Gobiobotia naktongensis, also known as the Nakdong Gudgeon, is a species of small freshwater fray-finned fish belonging to the family Gobionidae, the gudgeons. It is a critically endangered species endemic to South Korea.
