= Coreoleuciscus aeruginos =

Conservation status
- Least Concern (IUCN 3.1)

Scientific classification
- Kingdom: Animalia
- Phylum: Chordata
- Class: Actinopterygii
- Order: Cypriniformes
- Suborder: Cyprinoidei
- Family: Gobionidae
- Genus: Coreoleuciscus
- Species: C. aeruginos

Binomial name
- Coreoleuciscus aeruginos Song & Bang, 2015

Species of fish

Coreoleuciscus aeruginos is a species of ray-finned fish in the genus Coreoleuciscus found in Nakdong and Seomjin rivers in South Korea.
