= Gobio bulgaricus =

Conservation status
- Least Concern (IUCN 3.1)

Scientific classification
- Kingdom: Animalia
- Phylum: Chordata
- Class: Actinopterygii
- Order: Cypriniformes
- Suborder: Cyprinoidei
- Family: Gobionidae
- Genus: Gobio
- Species: G. bulgaricus

Binomial name
- Gobio bulgaricus Drensky, 1926

Species of fish

Gobio bulgaricus. the Aegean gudgeon, is a species of gudgeon, a small freshwater fish in the family Gobionidae. It is found in the Aegean basin, from the Maritsa to Aliakmon drainages in the southern Balkans, in North Macedonia, Greece, Bulgaria and East Thrace, Turkey.
