= Platysmacheilus obtusirostris =

Scientific classification
- Kingdom: Animalia
- Phylum: Chordata
- Class: Actinopterygii
- Order: Cypriniformes
- Suborder: Cyprinoidei
- Family: Gobionidae
- Genus: Platysmacheilus
- Species: P. obtusirostris

Binomial name
- Platysmacheilus obtusirostris (H. W. Wu & Ki. Fu. Wang, 1931)

Synonyms
- Pseudogobio obtusirostris Wu & Wang, 1931; Abbottina obtusirostris (Wu & Wang, 1931)

Species of fish

Platysmacheilus obtusirostris is a species of ray-finned fish in the family Gobionidae. the gudgeons. This species is found in the upper Yangtze River in Sichuan, China.
