= Saurogobio gracilicaudatus =

Scientific classification
- Kingdom: Animalia
- Phylum: Chordata
- Class: Actinopterygii
- Order: Cypriniformes
- Suborder: Cyprinoidei
- Family: Gobionidae
- Genus: Saurogobio
- Species: S. gracilicaudatus

Binomial name
- Saurogobio gracilicaudatus Yao & Yang, 1977

Species of fish

Saurogobio gracilicaudatus is a species of freshwater ray-finned fish belonging to the family Gobionidae, the gudgeons. This fish is endemic to China.
