= Eber gudgeon =

Conservation status
- Endangered (IUCN 3.1)

Scientific classification
- Kingdom: Animalia
- Phylum: Chordata
- Class: Actinopterygii
- Order: Cypriniformes
- Suborder: Cyprinoidei
- Family: Gobionidae
- Genus: Gobio
- Species: G. intermedius

Binomial name
- Gobio intermedius Battalgil, 1944

Species of fish

The Eber gudgeon (Gobio intermedius) is a species of gudgeon, a small freshwater ray-finned fish in the family Gobionidae. It is found in streams flowing to Lakes Eber and Akşehir in central Anatolia. The species previously occurred in the lakes themselves but have been extirpated due to the lakes drying out and from pollution.
