= Skadar gudgeon =

Conservation status
- Endangered (IUCN 3.1)

Scientific classification
- Kingdom: Animalia
- Phylum: Chordata
- Class: Actinopterygii
- Order: Cypriniformes
- Suborder: Cyprinoidei
- Family: Gobionidae
- Genus: Gobio
- Species: G. skadarensis

Binomial name
- Gobio skadarensis Karaman, 1937

Species of fish

The Skadar gudgeon (Gobio skadarensis) is a species of gudgeon, a small freshwater ray-finned fish in the family Gobionidae. It is found in the Lake Skadar basin in Montenegro and Albania.
