= Siberian gudgeon =

Conservation status
- Least Concern (IUCN 3.1)

Scientific classification
- Kingdom: Animalia
- Phylum: Chordata
- Class: Actinopterygii
- Order: Cypriniformes
- Suborder: Cyprinoidei
- Family: Gobionidae
- Genus: Gobio
- Species: G. cynocephalus

Binomial name
- Gobio cynocephalus Dybowski, 1869

Species of fish

The Siberian gudgeon (Gobio cynocephalus) is a species of gudgeon, a small freshwater fish in the family Gobionidae. It is found in the Amur drainage in Russia, China, and Mongolia.
