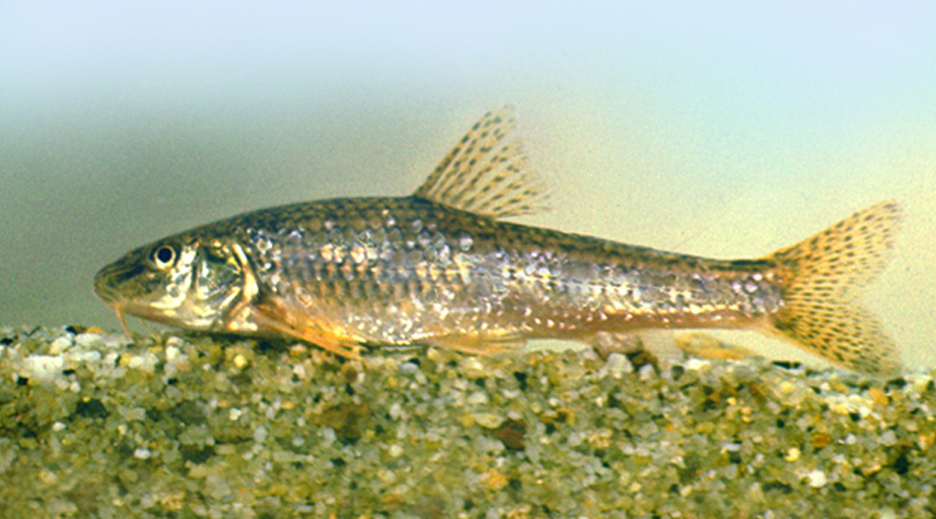

Conservation status
- Least Concern (IUCN 3.1)

Scientific classification
- Kingdom: Animalia
- Phylum: Chordata
- Class: Actinopterygii
- Order: Cypriniformes
- Suborder: Cyprinoidei
- Family: Gobionidae
- Genus: Gobio
- Species: G. carpathicus

Binomial name
- Gobio carpathicus Vladykov, 1925

Synonyms
- Gobio gobio carpathicus Vladykov, 1925

= Carpathian gudgeon =

Species of fish

The Carpathian gudgeon (Gobio carpathicus) is a species of gudgeon, a small freshwater ray-finned fish in the family Gobionidae. It is widespread in Europe in the Tisza system, Danube drainage in Ukraine. Freshwater demersal fish, up to 12.0 cm long.

== Etymology ==
Gobio is Latin for gobius which means gudgeon.

== Sources ==
- Froese, Rainer; Pauly, Daniel (eds.). "Gobio carpathicus". FishBase. December 2012 version.
