= Gobio rivuloides =

Scientific classification
- Kingdom: Animalia
- Phylum: Chordata
- Class: Actinopterygii
- Order: Cypriniformes
- Suborder: Cyprinoidei
- Family: Gobionidae
- Genus: Gobio
- Species: G. rivuloides

Binomial name
- Gobio rivuloides Nichols, 1925

Species of fish

Gobio rivuloides is a species of gudgeon, a small freshwater ray-finned fish in the family Gobionidae. It is endemic to China.
