= Gobiobotia filifer =

Scientific classification
- Kingdom: Animalia
- Phylum: Chordata
- Class: Actinopterygii
- Order: Cypriniformes
- Suborder: Cyprinoidei
- Family: Gobionidae
- Genus: Gobiobotia
- Species: G. filifer

Binomial name
- Gobiobotia filifer (Garman, 1912)

Synonyms
- Pseudogobio filifer Garman, 1912; Gobiobotia ichangensis P.-W. Fang, 1930; Gobiobotia kiatingensis P.-W. Fang, 1930

Species of freshwater fish from China

Gobiobotia filifer is a species of small freshwater ray-finned fish belonging to the family Gobionidae, the gudgeons. It is found in the Yangtze River in China.
