= Sakarya gudgeon =

Conservation status
- Least Concern (IUCN 3.1)

Scientific classification
- Kingdom: Animalia
- Phylum: Chordata
- Class: Actinopterygii
- Order: Cypriniformes
- Suborder: Cyprinoidei
- Family: Gobionidae
- Genus: Gobio
- Species: G. sakaryaensis

Binomial name
- Gobio sakaryaensis Turan, Ekmekçi, Lusková & Mendel, 2012

Species of fish

The Sakarya gudgeon (Gobio sakaryaensis) is a species of gudgeon, a small freshwater ray-finned fish in the family Gobionidae. It is found only in the Tozman Stream and Sakarya River in Turkey. It is a freshwater subtropical demersal fish, up to 11.5 cm long.

== See also ==
- Freshwater fish
