= Pseudogobio vaillanti =

Conservation status
- Least Concern (IUCN 3.1)

Scientific classification
- Kingdom: Animalia
- Phylum: Chordata
- Class: Actinopterygii
- Order: Cypriniformes
- Suborder: Cyprinoidei
- Family: Gobionidae
- Genus: Pseudogobio
- Species: P. vaillanti

Binomial name
- Pseudogobio vaillanti (Sauvage, 1878)

Synonyms
- Rhinogobio vaillanti Sauvage, 1878

Species of fish

Pseudogobio vaillanti is a species of freshwater ray-finned fish belonging to the family Gobionidae, the gudgeons. This fish is endemic to China.

Although patronym not identified but clearly in honor of Sauvage's colleague, zoologist Léon Vaillant (1834–1914).
