= Gobiobotia paucirastella =

Conservation status
- Vulnerable (IUCN 3.1)

Scientific classification
- Kingdom: Animalia
- Phylum: Chordata
- Class: Actinopterygii
- Order: Cypriniformes
- Suborder: Cyprinoidei
- Family: Gobionidae
- Genus: Gobiobotia
- Species: G. paucirastella

Binomial name
- Gobiobotia paucirastella M. L. Zheng & J. P. Yan, 1986

Species of freshwater fish from China

Gobiobotia paucirastella is a species of small freshwater ray-finned fish belonging to the family Gobionidae, the gudgeons. It is endemic to the Qujiang and Qiantang rivers in China.
