= Gobio kubanicus =

Conservation status
- Least Concern (IUCN 3.1)

Scientific classification
- Kingdom: Animalia
- Phylum: Chordata
- Class: Actinopterygii
- Order: Cypriniformes
- Suborder: Cyprinoidei
- Family: Gobionidae
- Genus: Gobio
- Species: G. kubanicus

Binomial name
- Gobio kubanicus Vasil'eva, 2004

Species of fish

Gobio kubanicus is a species of gudgeon, a small freshwater ray-finned fish in the family Gobionidae. It is found in the Kuban River basin in Russia.
