= Rhinogobio cylindricus =

Scientific classification
- Kingdom: Animalia
- Phylum: Chordata
- Class: Actinopterygii
- Order: Cypriniformes
- Suborder: Cyprinoidei
- Family: Gobionidae
- Genus: Rhinogobio
- Species: R. cylindricus

Binomial name
- Rhinogobio cylindricus Günther, 1888

Species of fish

Rhinogobio cylindricus is a species of freshwater ray-finned fish belonging to the family Gobionidae, the gudgeons. It is endemic to the middle and upper reaches of the Yangtze in China.

It can grow to 33.1 cm (13.0 in) total length and weigh up to 340 g (12 oz).
