= Gobio artvinicus =

Scientific classification
- Kingdom: Animalia
- Phylum: Chordata
- Class: Actinopterygii
- Order: Cypriniformes
- Suborder: Cyprinoidei
- Family: Gobionidae
- Genus: Gobio
- Species: G. artvinicus

Binomial name
- Gobio artvinicus Turan, Japoshvili, Aksu & Bektaş, 2016

Species of fish

Gobio artvinicus is a species of gudgeon, a small freshwater ray-finned fish in the family Gobionidae. It is found in Aralik and Çifteköpru Rivers in the Black Sea basin in Turkey.
