= Thessaly gudgeon =

Conservation status
- Vulnerable (IUCN 3.1)

Scientific classification
- Kingdom: Animalia
- Phylum: Chordata
- Class: Actinopterygii
- Order: Cypriniformes
- Suborder: Cyprinoidei
- Family: Gobionidae
- Genus: Gobio
- Species: G. feraeensis

Binomial name
- Gobio feraeensis Stephanidis, 1973

Species of fish

The Thessaly gudgeon (Gobio feraeensis) is a species of gudgeon, a small freshwater fish in the family Gobionidae. It is found in the Pineios and Karla Lake drainages in Greece.
