= Pseudogobio banggiangensis =

Scientific classification
- Kingdom: Animalia
- Phylum: Chordata
- Class: Actinopterygii
- Order: Cypriniformes
- Suborder: Cyprinoidei
- Family: Gobionidae
- Genus: Pseudogobio
- Species: P. banggiangensis

Binomial name
- Pseudogobio banggiangensis V. H. Nguyễn, 2001

Species of fish

Pseudogobio banggiangensis is a species of freshwater ray-finned fish belonging to the family Gobionidae, the gudgeons. This species is found in the Bằng River in Cao Bằng province, Viet Nam and Guangxi in southern China.
