= Cappadocian gudgeon =

Conservation status
- Critically Endangered (IUCN 3.1)

Scientific classification
- Kingdom: Animalia
- Phylum: Chordata
- Class: Actinopterygii
- Order: Cypriniformes
- Suborder: Cyprinoidei
- Family: Gobionidae
- Genus: Gobio
- Species: G. gymnostethus

Binomial name
- Gobio gymnostethus Ladiges, 1960

Species of fish

The Cappadocian gudgeon (Gobio gymnostethus) is a species of gudgeon, a small freshwater ray-finned fish in the family Gobionidae. It is endemic to the Melendiz drainage in Turkey.
