= Ohrid gudgeon =

Conservation status
- Vulnerable (IUCN 3.1)

Scientific classification
- Kingdom: Animalia
- Phylum: Chordata
- Class: Actinopterygii
- Order: Cypriniformes
- Suborder: Cyprinoidei
- Family: Gobionidae
- Genus: Gobio
- Species: G. ohridanus

Binomial name
- Gobio ohridanus Karaman, 1924

Species of fish

The Ohrid gudgeon (Gobio ohridanus) is a species of gudgeon, a small freshwater ray-finned fish in the family Gobionidae. It is endemic to Lake Ohrid in Macedonia and Albania.
