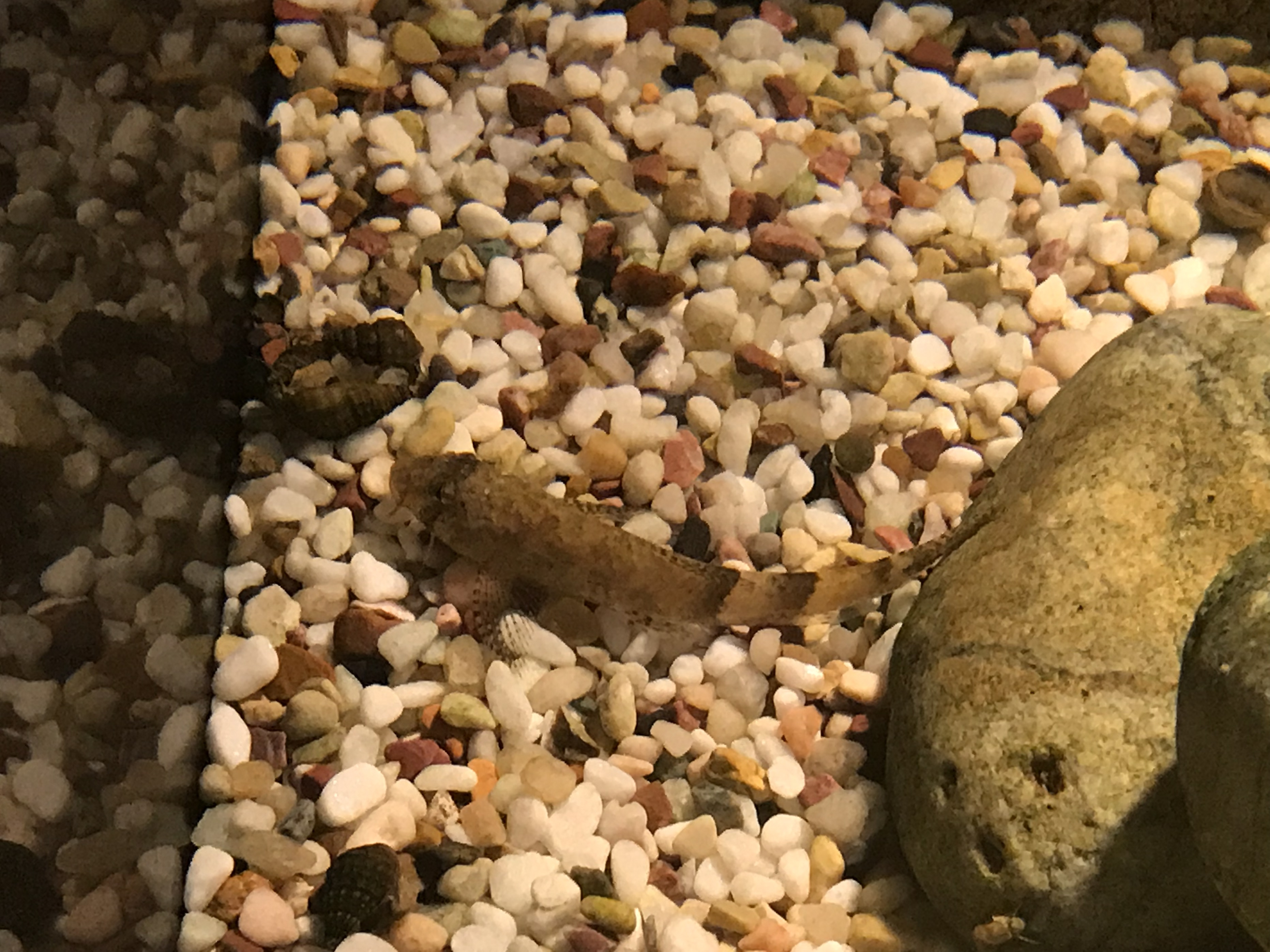

Conservation status
- Near Threatened (IUCN 3.1)

Scientific classification
- Kingdom: Animalia
- Phylum: Chordata
- Class: Actinopterygii
- Order: Cypriniformes
- Suborder: Cyprinoidei
- Family: Gobionidae
- Genus: Gobiobotia
- Species: G. macrocephala

Binomial name
- Gobiobotia macrocephala Mori, 1935

= Gobiobotia macrocephala =

Species of freshwater fish from Korea

Gobiobotia macrocephala, or kku-gu-ri, is a species of small freshwater ray-finned fish belonging to the family Gobionidae, the gudgeons. It is endemic to South Korea.
