= Platysmacheilus zhenjiangensis =

Scientific classification
- Kingdom: Animalia
- Phylum: Chordata
- Class: Actinopterygii
- Order: Cypriniformes
- Suborder: Cyprinoidei
- Family: Gobionidae
- Genus: Platysmacheilus
- Species: P. zhenjiangensis

Binomial name
- Platysmacheilus zhenjiangensis Y. Ni, X. H. Chen & G. Zhou, 2005

Species of fish

Platysmacheilus zhenjiangensis is a species of freshwater ray-finned fish belonging to the family Gobionidae, the gudgeons. This fish occurs in Jiangsu, China.
