= Mesogobio lachneri =

Scientific classification
- Kingdom: Animalia
- Phylum: Chordata
- Class: Actinopterygii
- Order: Cypriniformes
- Suborder: Cyprinoidei
- Family: Gobionidae
- Genus: Mesogobio
- Species: M. lachneri

Binomial name
- Mesogobio lachneri Bănărescu & Nalbant, 1973

Species of fish

Mesogobio lachnerithe Yalu River gudgeon, is a species of freshwater ray-finned fish belonging to the family Gobionidae, the gudgeons. It is endemic to the Yalu River on the border between China and North Korea.

== Etymology ==
Named in honor of Ernest A. Lachner (1916-1996), curator of fishes at the U.S. National Museum, for facilitating the senior author’s visits to several museums in the United States.
