= Gobiobotia jiangxiensis =

Conservation status
- Vulnerable (IUCN 3.1)

Scientific classification
- Kingdom: Animalia
- Phylum: Chordata
- Class: Actinopterygii
- Order: Cypriniformes
- Suborder: Cyprinoidei
- Family: Gobionidae
- Genus: Gobiobotia
- Species: G. jiangxiensis

Binomial name
- Gobiobotia jiangxiensis E. Zhang & H.-Z. Liu, 1995

Species of freshwater fish from China

Gobiobotia jiangxiensis is a species of small freshwater ray-finned fish belonging to the family Gobionidae, the gudgeons. It is endemic to Jianxi where it is known from only two localities in the Xin-jiang River system in Shangrao, Jiangxi.
