= Platysmacheilus longibarbatus =

Scientific classification
- Kingdom: Animalia
- Phylum: Chordata
- Class: Actinopterygii
- Order: Cypriniformes
- Suborder: Cyprinoidei
- Family: Gobionidae
- Genus: Platysmacheilus
- Species: P. longibarbatus

Binomial name
- Platysmacheilus longibarbatus Y. L. Lu, P. Q. Luo & Yi-Yu Chen, 1977

Species of fish

Platysmacheilus longibarbatus is a species of freshwater ray-finned fish belonging to the family Gobionidae, the gudgeons. This benthopelagic fish is found in areas with sand or rock beds in clear currents in the Yangtze drainage system in China.
