= Coreius guichenoti =

Scientific classification
- Domain: Eukaryota
- Kingdom: Animalia
- Phylum: Chordata
- Class: Actinopterygii
- Order: Cypriniformes
- Suborder: Cyprinoidei
- Family: Gobionidae
- Genus: Coreius
- Species: C. guichenoti

Binomial name
- Coreius guichenoti (Sauvage & Dabry de Thiersant, 1874)

Synonyms
- Saurogobio guichenoti Sauvage & Dabry de Thiersant, 1874; Coreius zeni T.-L. Tchang, 1930; Coreius platygnathus Nichols, 1941

Species of fish

Coreius guichenoti is a species of ray-finned fish in the genus Coreius found the upper reaches of the Yangtze in China.

Although patronym not identified but clearly in honor of the authors’ colleague, zoologist Antoine Alphonse Guichenot (1809-1876), Muséum national d’Histoire naturelle (Paris).
