= Gobio macrocephalus =

Conservation status
- Least Concern (IUCN 3.1)

Scientific classification
- Kingdom: Animalia
- Phylum: Chordata
- Class: Actinopterygii
- Order: Cypriniformes
- Suborder: Cyprinoidei
- Family: Gobionidae
- Genus: Gobio
- Species: G. macrocephalus

Binomial name
- Gobio macrocephalus Mori, 1930

Synonyms
- Gobio gobio macrocephalus Mori, 1930

Species of fish

Gobio macrocephalus, commonly known as bighead gudgeon, is a species of gudgeon, a small freshwater ray-finned fish in the family Gobionidae. It is found in Asia in South Korea, also in the Tumen River, China. It is a freshwater demersal fish, up to 14 centimetres (5.5 in) long.
