= Caspian gudgeon =

Conservation status
- Least Concern (IUCN 3.1)

Scientific classification
- Kingdom: Animalia
- Phylum: Chordata
- Class: Actinopterygii
- Order: Cypriniformes
- Suborder: Cyprinoidei
- Family: Gobionidae
- Genus: Gobio
- Species: G. holurus

Binomial name
- Gobio holurus Fowler, 1976

Species of fish

The Caspian gudgeon (Gobio holurus) is a freshwater a small freshwater ray-finned fish in the family Gobionidae. It is a small fish, less than 10 cm, which is distributed in the drainages of the Western Caspian Sea basin (Kuma, Terek and Sulak river drainages) in Russia and adjacent countries. It is widespread and not threatened, but there is no information about its biology.
