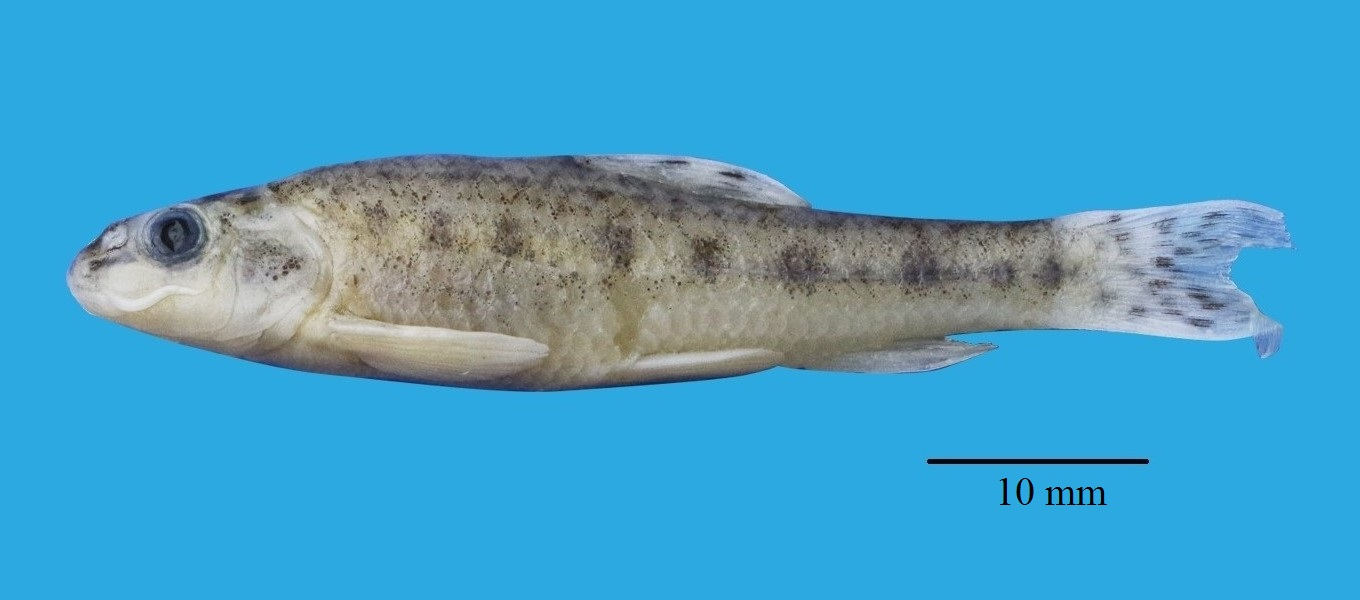

Conservation status
- Least Concern (IUCN 3.1)

Scientific classification
- Kingdom: Animalia
- Phylum: Chordata
- Class: Actinopterygii
- Order: Cypriniformes
- Suborder: Cyprinoidei
- Family: Gobionidae
- Genus: Gobio
- Species: G. sibiricus

Binomial name
- Gobio sibiricus Nikolsky, 1936

= Gobio sibiricus =

Species of fish

Gobio sibiricus is a species of gudgeon, a small freshwater ray-finned fish in the family Gobionidae. It was endemic to Mongolia, where it is found in Ob, Yenisei and Nura drainages. A recent study has shown that this species is also found in the upper reaches of the Amu Darya in Uzbekistan.
