= Gobiobotia guilingensis =

Conservation status
- Vulnerable (IUCN 3.1)

Scientific classification
- Kingdom: Animalia
- Phylum: Chordata
- Class: Actinopterygii
- Order: Cypriniformes
- Suborder: Cyprinoidei
- Family: Gobionidae
- Genus: Gobiobotia
- Species: G. guilingensis

Binomial name
- Gobiobotia guilingensis Yi-Yu Chen, 1989

Species of freshwater fish from China

Gobiobotia guilingensis is a species of small freshwater ray-finned fish belonging to the family Gobionidae, the gudgeons. It is endemic to Guangxi in China.
