= Gobiobotia homalopteroidea =

Scientific classification
- Kingdom: Animalia
- Phylum: Chordata
- Class: Actinopterygii
- Order: Cypriniformes
- Suborder: Cyprinoidei
- Family: Gobionidae
- Genus: Gobiobotia
- Species: G. homalopteroidea

Binomial name
- Gobiobotia homalopteroidea Rendahl, 1933

Species of freshwater fish from China

Gobiobotia homalopteroidea is a species of small ray-finned fish belonging to the family Gobionidae, the gudgeons. It is endemic to the Yellow River in China.
