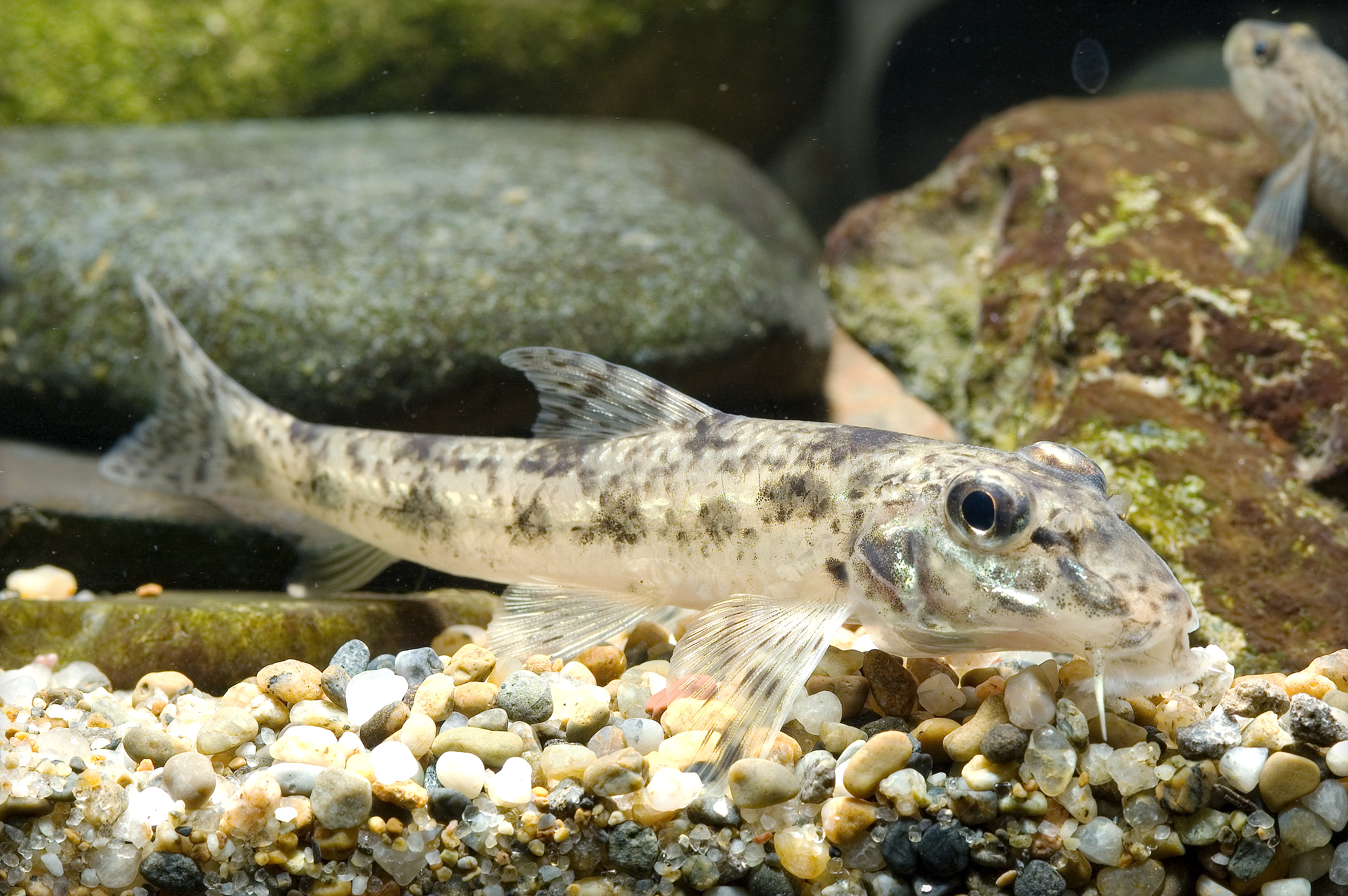

Scientific classification
- Kingdom: Animalia
- Phylum: Chordata
- Class: Actinopterygii
- Order: Cypriniformes
- Suborder: Cyprinoidei
- Family: Gobionidae
- Genus: Pseudogobio
- Species: P. esocinus

Binomial name
- Pseudogobio esocinus (Temminck & Schlegel, 1846)

Synonyms
- Gobio esocinus (Temminck & Schlegel, 1846)

= Pseudogobio esocinus =

Species of fish

Pseudogobio esocinus, or the Japanese gudgeon, is a species of freshwater ray-finned fish belonging to the family Gobionidae, the gudgeons. This small fish is widely distributed in fresh-water streams and lakes across Japan, the Korean Peninsula, and China.
