= Rhinogobio hunanensis =

Conservation status
- Data Deficient (IUCN 3.1)

Scientific classification
- Kingdom: Animalia
- Phylum: Chordata
- Class: Actinopterygii
- Order: Cypriniformes
- Suborder: Cyprinoidei
- Family: Gobionidae
- Genus: Rhinogobio
- Species: R. hunanensis

Binomial name
- Rhinogobio hunanensis J.-H. Tang, 1980

Species of fish

Rhinogobio hunanensis is a species of freshwater ray-finned fish belonging to the family Gobionidae, the gudgeons. It is endemic to the middle and upper reaches of the Yuan River in China.

It can grow to 20.3 cm (8.0 in) standard length.
