= Xenophysogobio nudicorpa =

Scientific classification
- Kingdom: Animalia
- Phylum: Chordata
- Class: Actinopterygii
- Order: Cypriniformes
- Suborder: Cyprinoidei
- Family: Gobionidae
- Genus: Xenophysogobio
- Species: X. nudicorpa

Binomial name
- Xenophysogobio nudicorpa (H. J. Huang & W. Zhang, 1986)

Synonyms
- Gobiobotia nudicorpa H. J. Huang & W. Zhang, 1986

Species of fish

Xenophysogobio nudicorpa is a species of freshwater ray-finned fish belonging to the family Gobionidae, the gudgeons. This species of gudgeon is endemic to China.
