= Placogobio micropulvinus =

Scientific classification
- Kingdom: Animalia
- Phylum: Chordata
- Class: Actinopterygii
- Order: Cypriniformes
- Suborder: Cyprinoidei
- Family: Gobionidae
- Genus: Placogobio
- Species: P. micropulvinus

Binomial name
- Placogobio micropulvinus (W. Zhou, X. F. Pan, and Kottelat, 2005)

Synonyms
- Ageneiogarra micropulvinus; Garra micropulvinus; Supradiscus micropulvinus

Species of fish

Placogobio micropulvinus is a species of cyprinid fish in the subfamily Gobionidae. It is endemic to the upper Red River drainage in Yunnan, China. It grows to 13 cm (5.1 in) standard length.

== Ecology ==
At the type locality in Xichou County, Placogobio micropulvinus prefer stream stretches with a rapid current and stony substrate. The diet is mostly based on algae, but they also feed on other aquatic plants and on larvae of aquatic insects. According to local knowledge, adults conduct an upstream spawning migration in September–December, with spawning taking place in pools of clear water.
