= Varna gudgeon =

Conservation status
- Vulnerable (IUCN 3.1)

Scientific classification
- Kingdom: Animalia
- Phylum: Chordata
- Class: Actinopterygii
- Order: Cypriniformes
- Suborder: Cyprinoidei
- Family: Gobionidae
- Genus: Gobio
- Species: G. kovatschevi

Binomial name
- Gobio kovatschevi Chichkoff, 1937

Species of fish

The Varna gudgeon (Gobio kovatschevi) is a species of gudgeon, a small freshwater ray-finned fish in the family Gobionidae. It is endemic to the Provadiskaya River in Bulgaria.
