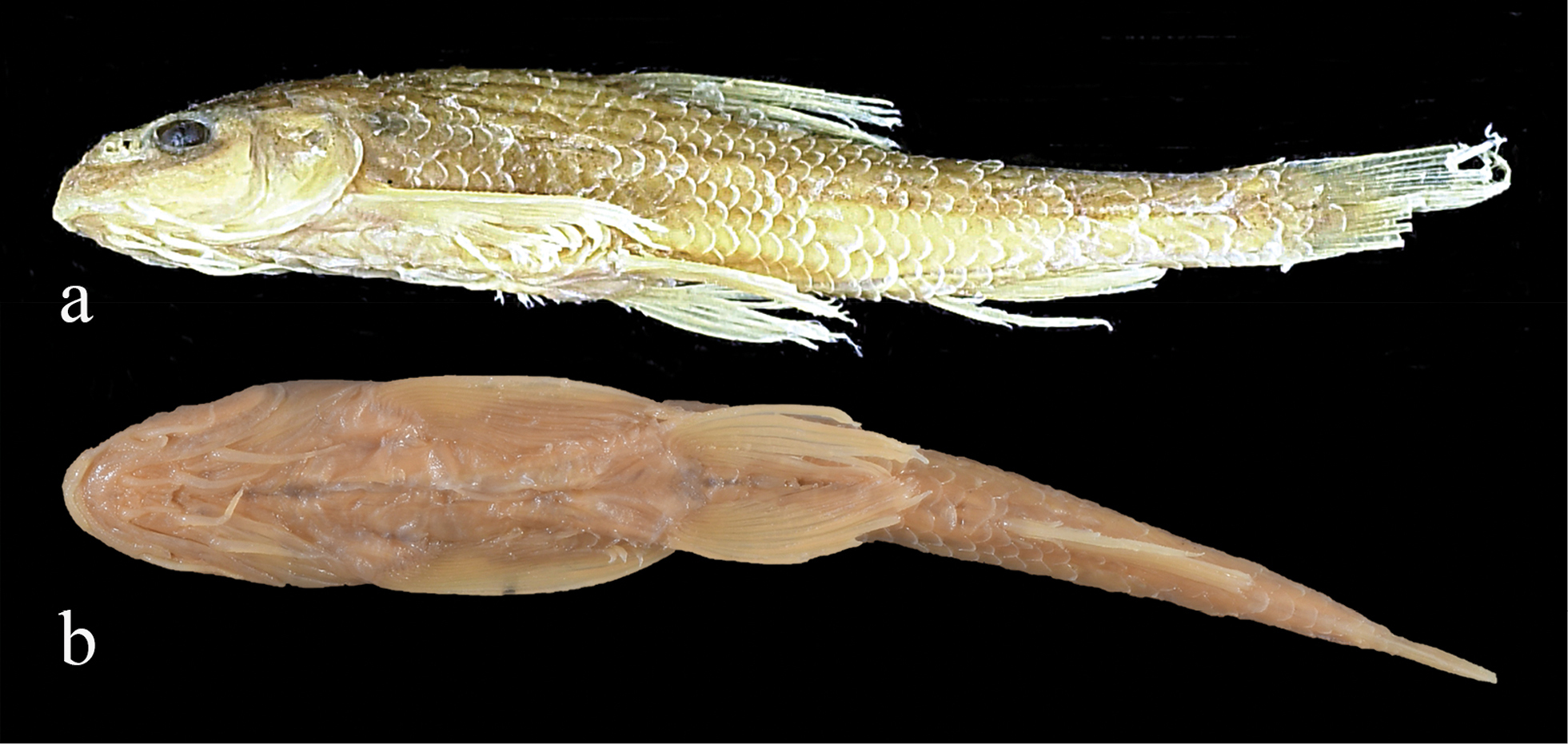

Scientific classification
- Kingdom: Animalia
- Phylum: Chordata
- Class: Actinopterygii
- Order: Cypriniformes
- Suborder: Cyprinoidei
- Family: Gobionidae
- Genus: Gobiobotia
- Species: G. nicholsi

Binomial name
- Gobiobotia nicholsi Bănărescu & Nalbant, 1966

= Gobiobotia nicholsi =

Species of freshwater fish from China

Gobiobotia nicholsi is a species of small freshwater ray-finned fish belonging to the family Gobionidae, the gudgeons. It is endemic to China.

Named in honor of John Treadwell Nichols (1883-1958), curator of fishes at the American Museum of Natural History.
