= Manchurian gudgeon =

Scientific classification
- Kingdom: Animalia
- Phylum: Chordata
- Class: Actinopterygii
- Order: Cypriniformes
- Suborder: Cyprinoidei
- Family: Gobionidae
- Genus: Paraleucogobio
- Species: P. strigatus

Binomial name
- Paraleucogobio strigatus (Regan, 1908)

Species of fish

The Manchurian gudgeon (Paraleucogobio strigatus) is a species of ray-finned fish belonging to the family Gobionidae, the gudgeons. This fish is found in the Amur drainage in Russia, China, Korea, and Mongolia.
