= Saurogobio lissilabris =

Scientific classification
- Domain: Eukaryota
- Kingdom: Animalia
- Phylum: Chordata
- Class: Actinopterygii
- Order: Cypriniformes
- Suborder: Cyprinoidei
- Family: Gobionidae
- Genus: Saurogobio
- Species: S. lissilabris

Binomial name
- Saurogobio lissilabris Bănărescu & Nalbant, 1973

Synonyms
- Saurogobio lissilabri

Species of fish

Saurogobio lissilabris is a species of ray-finned fish in the Gobionidae family and live in China. They can grow up to 10.0 cm in length. They have a hearing range and threshold of 2000 Hz and 65 db. They are also a sexual reproductive species like most animals.

== History ==
Saurogobio lissilabris were originally found in 1973 in the Southeastern part of China.
