= Placogobio incisorbis =

Scientific classification
- Kingdom: Animalia
- Phylum: Chordata
- Class: Actinopterygii
- Order: Cypriniformes
- Suborder: Cyprinoidei
- Family: Gobionidae
- Genus: Placogobio
- Species: P. incisorbis

Binomial name
- Placogobio incisorbis (L. P. Zheng, J. X. Yang, & X. Y. Chen, 2016)

Synonyms
- Garra incisorbis L. P. Zheng, J. X. Yang, & X. Y. Chen, 2016; Supradiscus incisorbis (L. P. Zheng, J. X. Yang, & X. Y. Chen, 2016)

Species of fish

Placogobio incisorbis is a species of fish in the family Gobionidae, endemic to the Pearl River Basin in Guangxi, China. Originally described as Garra incisorbis, which placed it as a Labeonine cyprinid fish, in 2016. it was moved to the new genus Supradiscus in 2024.
