= Fushun gudgeon =

Scientific classification
- Kingdom: Animalia
- Phylum: Chordata
- Class: Actinopterygii
- Order: Cypriniformes
- Suborder: Cyprinoidei
- Family: Gobionidae
- Genus: Gobio
- Species: G. fushunensis

Binomial name
- Gobio fushunensis Xie, Li & Xie, 2007

Species of fish

The Fushun gudgeon (Gobio fushunensis) is a species of gudgeon, a small freshwater fish in the family Gobionidae. It is found in China.
