= Saurogobio gymnocheilus =

Scientific classification
- Kingdom: Animalia
- Phylum: Chordata
- Class: Actinopterygii
- Order: Cypriniformes
- Suborder: Cyprinoidei
- Family: Gobionidae
- Genus: Saurogobio
- Species: S. gymnocheilus

Binomial name
- Saurogobio gymnocheilus Y.-L. Luo, P.-Q. Yue & Y.-Y. Chen, 1977

Species of fish

Saurogobio gymnocheilus is a species of freshwater ray-finned fish belonging to the family Gobionidae, the gudgeons. This fish is endemic to China.
