= Rhinogobio ventralis =

Scientific classification
- Kingdom: Animalia
- Phylum: Chordata
- Class: Actinopterygii
- Order: Cypriniformes
- Suborder: Cyprinoidei
- Family: Gobionidae
- Genus: Rhinogobio
- Species: R. ventralis

Binomial name
- Rhinogobio ventralis Sauvage & Dabry de Thiersant, 1874

Species of fish

Rhinogobio ventralis is a species of freshwater ray-finned fish belonging to the family Gobionidae, the gudgeons. It is endemic to the middle and upper reaches of the Yangtze in China.

It can grow to 29.5 cm (11.6 in) standard length and weigh up to 254 g (9.0 oz).
