= Pseudogobio guilinensis =

Conservation status
- Data Deficient (IUCN 3.1)

Scientific classification
- Kingdom: Animalia
- Phylum: Chordata
- Class: Actinopterygii
- Order: Cypriniformes
- Suborder: Cyprinoidei
- Family: Gobionidae
- Genus: Pseudogobio
- Species: P. guilinensis

Binomial name
- Pseudogobio guilinensis Yao & Yang, 1977

Synonyms
- Microphysogobio giganteus Đ. Y. Mai, 1978

Species of fish

Pseudogobio guilinensis is a species of freshwater ray-finned fish belonging to the family Gobionidae, the gudgeons. This fish occurs in China and Vietnam.
