= Gobiobotia yuanjiangensis =

Scientific classification
- Kingdom: Animalia
- Phylum: Chordata
- Class: Actinopterygii
- Order: Cypriniformes
- Suborder: Cyprinoidei
- Family: Gobionidae
- Genus: Gobiobotia
- Species: G. yuanjiangensis

Binomial name
- Gobiobotia yuanjiangensis Yi-Yu Chen & Cao, 1977

Species of freshwater fish from China

Gobiobotia yuanjiangensis is a species of small freshwater ray-finned fish belonging to the family Gobionidae, the gudgeons. It is endemic to Yunnan in China.
