= Platysmacheilus nudiventris =

Scientific classification
- Kingdom: Animalia
- Phylum: Chordata
- Class: Actinopterygii
- Order: Cypriniformes
- Suborder: Cyprinoidei
- Family: Gobionidae
- Genus: Platysmacheilus
- Species: P. nudiventris

Binomial name
- Platysmacheilus nudiventris P. Q. Luo, Y. L. Lu & Yi-Yu Chen, 1977

Species of fish

Platysmacheilus nudiventris is a species of freshwater ray-finned fish belonging to the family Gobionidae, the gudgeons. This benthopelagic fish occurs in the upper reaches of the Yangtze River in China.
