= Gobiobotia meridionalis =

Conservation status
- Data Deficient (IUCN 3.1)

Scientific classification
- Kingdom: Animalia
- Phylum: Chordata
- Class: Actinopterygii
- Order: Cypriniformes
- Suborder: Cyprinoidei
- Family: Gobionidae
- Genus: Gobiobotia
- Species: G. meridionalis

Binomial name
- Gobiobotia meridionalis Yi-Yu Chen & Cao, 1977

Species of freshwater fish from China

Gobiobotia meridionalis is a species of small freshwater ray-finned fish belonging to the family Gobionidae, the gudgeons. It is endemic to the Pearl River basin in China.
