= Coreius cetopsis =

Scientific classification
- Kingdom: Animalia
- Phylum: Chordata
- Class: Actinopterygii
- Order: Cypriniformes
- Suborder: Cyprinoidei
- Family: Gobionidae
- Genus: Coreius
- Species: C. cetopsis

Binomial name
- Coreius cetopsis (Kner, 1867)

Synonyms
- Labeo cetopsis Kner, 1867

Species of fish

Coreius cetopsis is a species of ray-finned fish in the genus Coreius found in China.
