= Coreius heterodon =

Scientific classification
- Kingdom: Animalia
- Phylum: Chordata
- Class: Actinopterygii
- Division: Teleostei
- Order: Cypriniformes
- Suborder: Cyprinoidei
- Family: Gobionidae
- Genus: Coreius
- Species: C. heterodon

Binomial name
- Coreius heterodon (Bleeker, 1864)

Synonyms
- Gobio heterodon Bleeker, 1864; Zezera rathbuni D. S. Jordan & Seale, 1905; Pseudogobio styani Günther, 1889; Coripareius styani (Günther, 1889)

Species of fish

Zezera rathbuni

Coreius heterodon is a species of ray-finned fish in the genus Coreius found in China and Korea.
