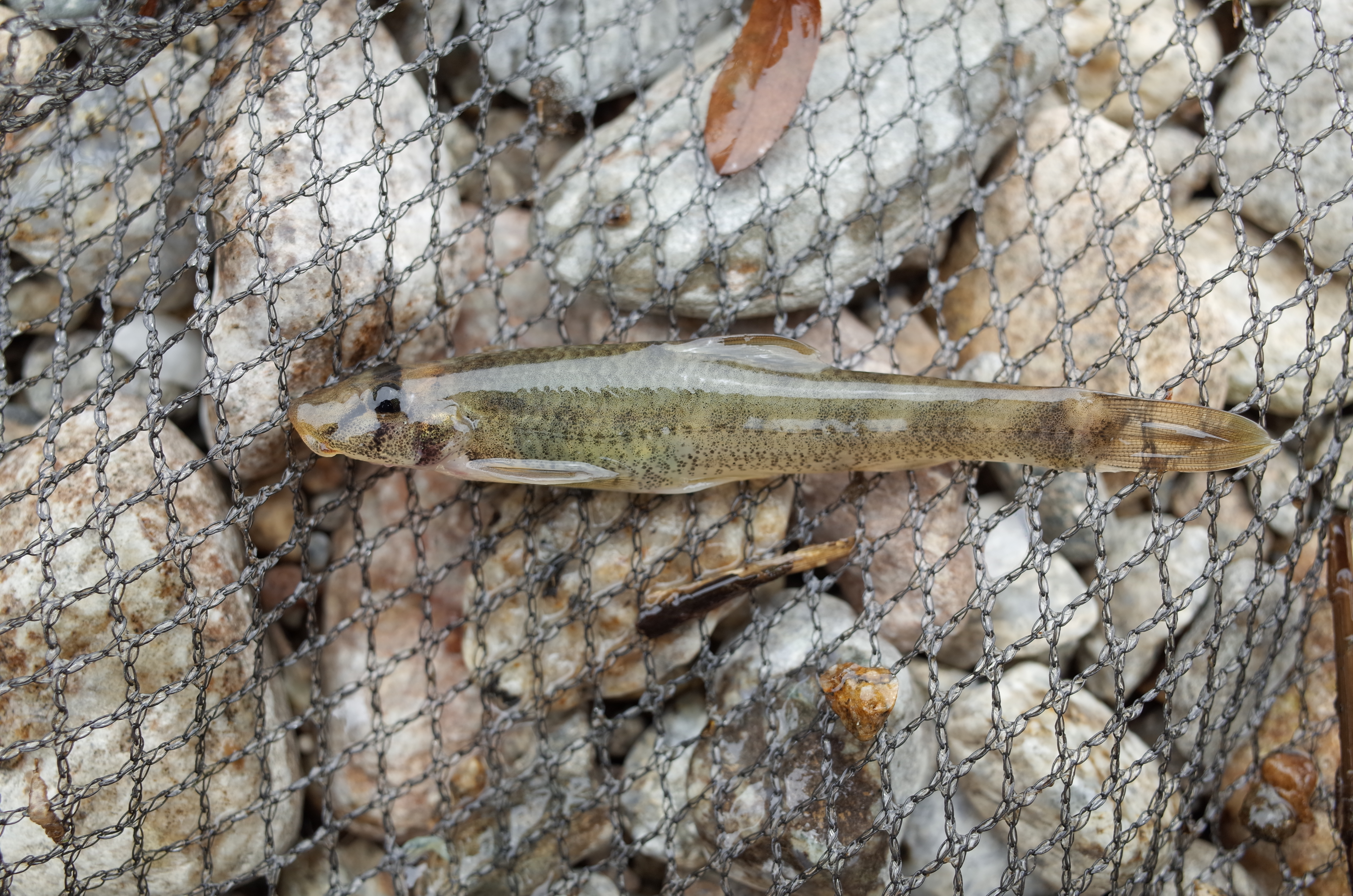

Scientific classification
- Kingdom: Animalia
- Phylum: Chordata
- Class: Actinopterygii
- Order: Cypriniformes
- Suborder: Cyprinoidei
- Family: Gobionidae
- Genus: Gobiobotia
- Species: G. brevibarba

Binomial name
- Gobiobotia brevibarba Mori, 1935

= Gobiobotia brevibarba =

Species of freshwater fish from Korea

Gobiobotia brevibarba is a species of small freshwater ray-finned fish belonging to the family Gobionidae, the gudgeons. It is endemic to South Korea.
