= Soldatov's gudgeon =

Conservation status
- Least Concern (IUCN 3.1)

Scientific classification
- Kingdom: Animalia
- Phylum: Chordata
- Class: Actinopterygii
- Order: Cypriniformes
- Suborder: Cyprinoidei
- Family: Gobionidae
- Genus: Gobio
- Species: G. soldatovi

Binomial name
- Gobio soldatovi Berg, 1914

Synonyms
- Gobio gobio soldatovi Berg, 1914; Gobio soldatovi soldatovi Berg, 1914; Gobio gobio tungussicus Borisov, 1928

Species of fish

The Soldatov's gudgeon (Gobio soldatovi) is a species of gudgeon, a small freshwater ray-finned fish in the family Gobionidae. It is found in Asia in the Amur River drainage in Russia and China, on the Sakhalin Island, and in Lake Buir in Mongolia. It is a demersal fish, up to 12.0 cm long.

Named in honor of ichthyologist Vladimir Soldatov (1875–1941), who collected type specimen.
