= Gobio meridionalis =

Scientific classification
- Kingdom: Animalia
- Phylum: Chordata
- Class: Actinopterygii
- Order: Cypriniformes
- Suborder: Cyprinoidei
- Family: Gobionidae
- Genus: Gobio
- Species: G. meridionalis

Binomial name
- Gobio meridionalis T. Q. Xu, 1987

Species of fish

Gobio meridionalis is a species of gudgeon, a small freshwater ray-finned fish in the family Gobionidae. It is found in the middle reaches of Huanghe River in China.

== Size ==
This species reaches a length of 11.6 cm (4.6 in).
