= Platysmacheilus exiguus =

Conservation status
- Least Concern (IUCN 3.1)

Scientific classification
- Kingdom: Animalia
- Phylum: Chordata
- Class: Actinopterygii
- Order: Cypriniformes
- Suborder: Cyprinoidei
- Family: Gobionidae
- Genus: Platysmacheilus
- Species: P. exiguus

Binomial name
- Platysmacheilus exiguus (S.-Y. Lin, 1932)

Synonyms
- Saurogobio exiguus S.-Y. Lin, 1932; Microphysogobio exiguus (S.-Y. Lin 1932); Pseudogobio exiguus (S.-Y. Lin, 1932)

Species of fish

Platysmacheilus exiguus is a species of freshwater ray-finned fish belonging to the family Gobionidae, the gudgeons. This fish is known to occur in the Bei Jiang and Xi Jiang, tributaries of the Pearl River, in the Guangxi, Guizhou and Guangdong provinces, and it possibly also occurs in Viet Nam. It is found in waters with a moderate to fast current where the bed consists of gravel or stone.
