= Gobio acutipinnatus =

Scientific classification
- Kingdom: Animalia
- Phylum: Chordata
- Class: Actinopterygii
- Order: Cypriniformes
- Suborder: Cyprinoidei
- Family: Gobionidae
- Genus: Gobio
- Species: G. acutipinnatus

Binomial name
- Gobio acutipinnatus Men'shikov, 1939

Species of fish

Gobio acutipinnatus is a species of gudgeon, a small freshwater fish in the family Gobionidae. It is found in China.
