= Işıklı gudgeon =

Conservation status
- Endangered (IUCN 3.1)

Scientific classification
- Kingdom: Animalia
- Phylum: Chordata
- Class: Actinopterygii
- Order: Cypriniformes
- Suborder: Cyprinoidei
- Family: Gobionidae
- Genus: Gobio
- Species: G. maeandricus

Binomial name
- Gobio maeandricus Naseka, Erk'akan & Küçük, 2006

Species of fish

The Işıklı gudgeon (Gobio maeandricus) is a species of gudgeon, a small freshwater ray-finned fish in the family Gobionidae. It is endemic to the Büyük Menderes River in Turkey.
