= Saurogobio xiangjiangensis =

Scientific classification
- Kingdom: Animalia
- Phylum: Chordata
- Class: Actinopterygii
- Order: Cypriniformes
- Suborder: Cyprinoidei
- Family: Gobionidae
- Genus: Saurogobio
- Species: S. xiangjiangensis

Binomial name
- Saurogobio xiangjiangensis J. H. Tang, 1980

Species of fish

Saurogobio xiangjiangensis is a species of freshwater ray-finned fish belonging to the family Gobionidae, the gudgeons. This fish is endemic in China.
