= Gobiobotia tungi =

Conservation status
- Data Deficient (IUCN 3.1)

Scientific classification
- Kingdom: Animalia
- Phylum: Chordata
- Class: Actinopterygii
- Order: Cypriniformes
- Suborder: Cyprinoidei
- Family: Gobionidae
- Genus: Gobiobotia
- Species: G. tungi

Binomial name
- Gobiobotia tungi P. W. Fang, 1933

Species of freshwater fish from China

Gobiobotia tungi is a species of small freshwater ray-finned fish belonging to the family Gobionidae, the gudgeons. It is endemic to the Fuchunjiang River in China.
