= Saurogobio dumerili =

Scientific classification
- Kingdom: Animalia
- Phylum: Chordata
- Class: Actinopterygii
- Order: Cypriniformes
- Suborder: Cyprinoidei
- Family: Gobionidae
- Genus: Saurogobio
- Species: S. dumerili

Binomial name
- Saurogobio dumerili Bleeker, 1871

Synonyms
- Saurogobio dorsalis Y.-T. Chu, 1932

Species of fish

Saurogobio dumerili is a species of freshwater ray-finned fish belonging to the family Gobionidae, the gudgeons. This species is endemic to China.

Named in honor of Auguste Duméril (1812–1870), herpetologist and ichthyologist, Muséum national d’Histoire naturelle (Paris), who invited Bleeker to examine Chinese cyprinids in the museum’s collection.
