= Gobiobotia abbreviata =

Scientific classification
- Kingdom: Animalia
- Phylum: Chordata
- Class: Actinopterygii
- Order: Cypriniformes
- Suborder: Cyprinoidei
- Family: Gobionidae
- Genus: Gobiobotia
- Species: G. abbreviata

Binomial name
- Gobiobotia abbreviata Fang & Ki. Fu. Wang, 1931

Species of freshwater fish from China

Gobiobotia abbreviata is a species of small freshwater ray-finned fish belonging to the family Gobionidae, the gudgeons. It is found in the upper drainages of the Yangtze in China.
