= Mesogobio tumenensis =

Conservation status
- Least Concern (IUCN 3.1)

Scientific classification
- Kingdom: Animalia
- Phylum: Chordata
- Class: Actinopterygii
- Order: Cypriniformes
- Suborder: Cyprinoidei
- Family: Gobionidae
- Genus: Mesogobio
- Species: M. tumenensis

Binomial name
- Mesogobio tumenensis Chang, 1980

Species of fish

Mesogobio tumenensis is a species of freshwater ray-finned fishes belonging to the family Gobionidae, the gudgeons. It is endemic to the Tumen River in China.
