= Rhinogobio nasutus =

Scientific classification
- Kingdom: Animalia
- Phylum: Chordata
- Class: Actinopterygii
- Order: Cypriniformes
- Suborder: Cyprinoidei
- Family: Gobionidae
- Genus: Rhinogobio
- Species: R. nasutus

Binomial name
- Rhinogobio nasutus (Kessler, 1876)

Synonyms
- Megagobio nasutus Kessler, 1876

Species of fish

Rhinogobio nasutus is a species of freshwater ray-finned fish belonging to the family Gobionidae, the gudgeons. It is endemic to the Yellow River in China.

It can grow to 30 cm (12 in) total length.
