= Beyşehir gudgeon =

Conservation status
- Vulnerable (IUCN 3.1)

Scientific classification
- Kingdom: Animalia
- Phylum: Chordata
- Class: Actinopterygii
- Order: Cypriniformes
- Suborder: Cyprinoidei
- Family: Gobionidae
- Genus: Gobio
- Species: G. microlepidotus

Binomial name
- Gobio microlepidotus Battalgil, 1942

Species of fish

The Beyşehir gudgeon (Gobio microlepidotus) is a species of gudgeon, a small freshwater ray-finned fish in the family Gobionidae. It is endemic to Lake Beyşehir in Turkey.
