= Gobio hettitorum =

Conservation status
- Critically Endangered (IUCN 3.1)

Scientific classification
- Kingdom: Animalia
- Phylum: Chordata
- Class: Actinopterygii
- Order: Cypriniformes
- Suborder: Cyprinoidei
- Family: Gobionidae
- Genus: Gobio
- Species: G. hettitorum

Binomial name
- Gobio hettitorum Ladiges, 1960

Species of fish

Gobio hettitorum, the Taurus gudgeon or Anatolian gudgeon, (also cited as dere kayasi) is a species of gudgeon, a small freshwater ray-finned fish in the family Gobionidae. It is found only in the 15 km long Gökdere stream and formerly in the Ereğli marshes in Turkey. It is listed on the IUCN Red List of Threatened Species and is threatened by habitat loss, the Ereğli marshes dried out in the 1990s which caused the extirpation of this species there, but not by pollution.
