= Ukrainian gudgeon =

Conservation status
- Least Concern (IUCN 3.1)

Scientific classification
- Kingdom: Animalia
- Phylum: Chordata
- Class: Actinopterygii
- Order: Cypriniformes
- Suborder: Cyprinoidei
- Family: Gobionidae
- Genus: Gobio
- Species: G. sarmaticus

Binomial name
- Gobio sarmaticus Berg, 1949

Species of fish

The Ukrainian gudgeon (Gobio sarmaticus) is a species of gudgeon, a small freshwater ray-finned fish in the family Gobionidae. It is widespread in the lower parts of Dniester and Southern Bug drainages in Ukraine and Moldova. It is also likely to be present in the lower Dnieper River. It is a freshwater demersal fish, and grows up to 13 cm length.
