= Paraleucogobio notacanthus =

Scientific classification
- Kingdom: Animalia
- Phylum: Chordata
- Class: Actinopterygii
- Order: Cypriniformes
- Family: Gobionidae
- Genus: Paraleucogobio
- Species: P. notacanthus

Binomial name
- Paraleucogobio notacanthus Berg, 1907

Synonyms
- Gnathopogon notacanthus (Berg 1907)

Species of fish

Paraleucogobio notacanthus is a species of freshwater ray-finned fish belonging to the family Gobionidae, the gudgeons. This species is found in China.
