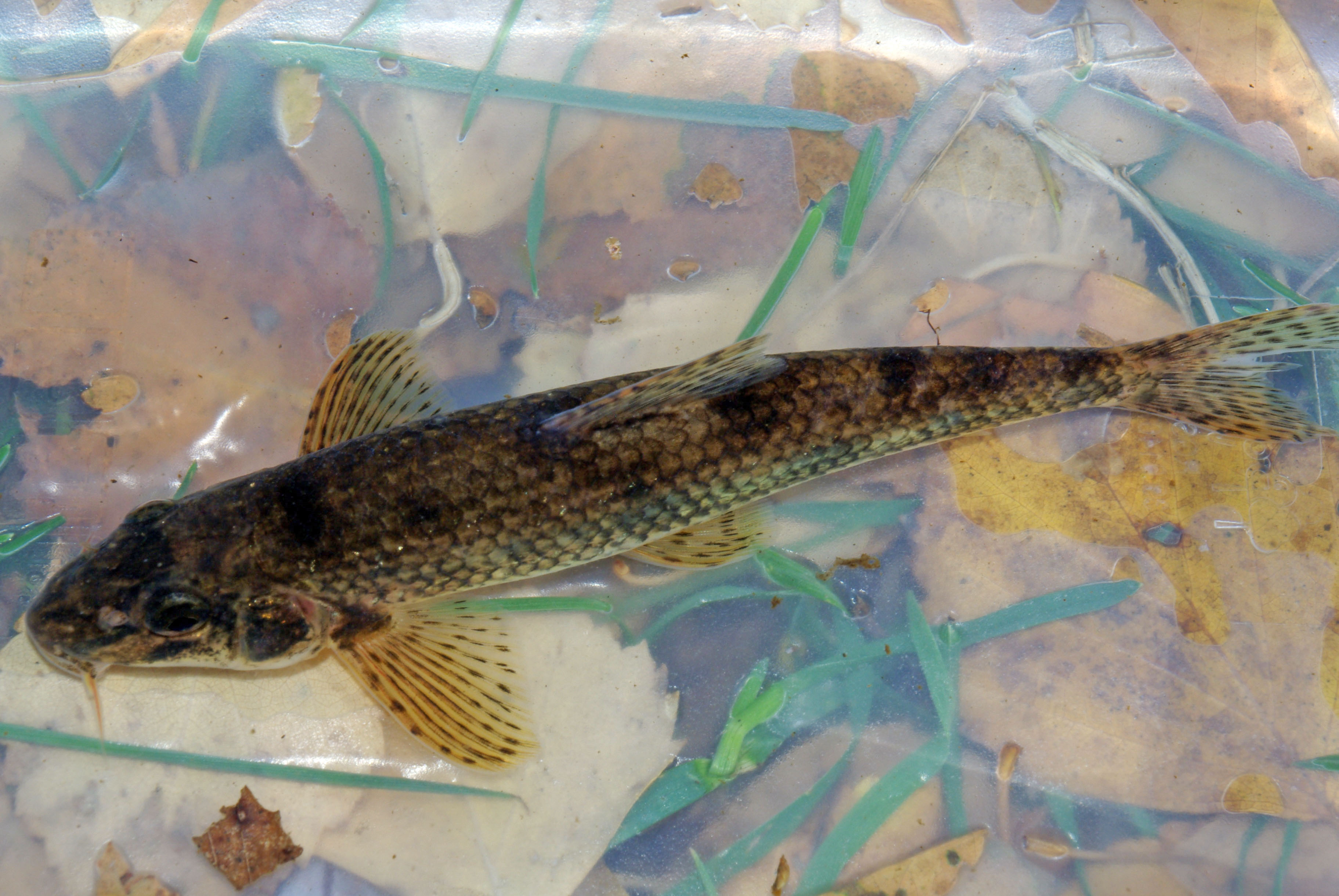

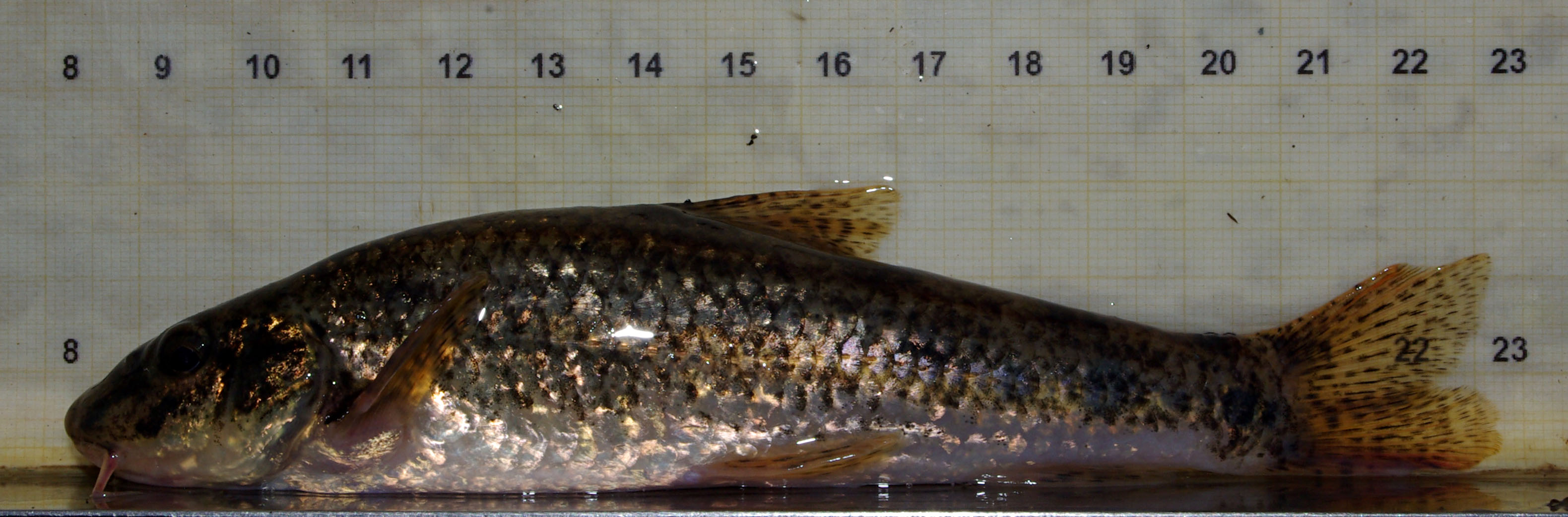

Conservation status
- Least Concern (IUCN 3.1)

Scientific classification
- Kingdom: Animalia
- Phylum: Chordata
- Class: Actinopterygii
- Division: Teleostei
- Order: Cypriniformes
- Family: Gobionidae
- Genus: Gobio
- Species: G. lozanoi

Binomial name
- Gobio lozanoi Doadrio & Madeira, 2004
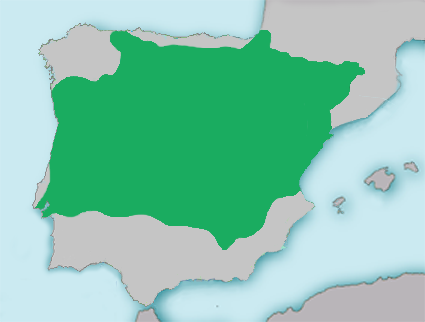
- Species range

= Iberian gudgeon =

Species of fish

Iberian gudgeon (Gobio lozanoi) is a species of gudgeon, a small freshwater ray-finned fish in the family Gobionidae. It is widespread only in the Iberian Peninsula where it is indigenous in the Ebro and Bidasoa drainage, and in France in the Adour drainage, as well as Andorra. It has been introduced throughout the Iberian Peninsula, including Portugal, It is a freshwater demersal fish, up to 11.9 cm long.

== Etymology ==
Named in honor of Luis Lozano Rey (1878-1958), University of Madrid, for his contribution to the knowledge of Iberian freshwater fishes.
