= Placogobio bacmeensis =

Conservation status
- Data Deficient (IUCN 3.1)

Scientific classification
- Kingdom: Animalia
- Phylum: Chordata
- Class: Actinopterygii
- Order: Cypriniformes
- Family: Gobionidae
- Genus: Placogobio
- Species: P. bacmeensis

Binomial name
- Placogobio bacmeensis V. H. Nguyễn & S. V. Ngô, 2001

Species of fish

Placogobio bacmeensis is a species of freshwater ray-finned fish belonging to the family Gobionidae, the gudgeons. This species is endemic to Viet Nam.
