= Paracanthobrama =

Scientific classification
- Kingdom: Animalia
- Phylum: Chordata
- Class: Actinopterygii
- Order: Cypriniformes
- Suborder: Cyprinoidei
- Family: Gobionidae
- Genus: Paracanthobrama; Bleeker, 1864
- Species: P. guichenoti

Binomial name
- Paracanthobrama guichenoti Bleeker, 1864

Synonyms
- Genus: Gladobarbus Fowler, 1930; Species: Hemibarbus guichenoti (Bleeker, 1864); Hemibarbus dissimilis Bleeker, 1871; Barbus nigriparipinnis Fowler, 1930; Hemibarbus soochowensis T.-H. Shaw, 1930; Paracanthobrama pingi H.-W. Wu, 1930

Monotypic genus of fish

Paracanthobrama is a monospecific genus of freshwater ray-finned fish belonging to the family Gobionidae. the gudgeons. The only species in the genus is Paracanthobrama guichenoti, a species which is endemic to China.

Named in honor of Antoine Alphonse Guichenot (1809-1876), assistant naturalist at Musée du Jardin des Plantes a Paris.
