= Platysmacheilus wangcangensis =

Scientific classification
- Kingdom: Animalia
- Phylum: Chordata
- Class: Actinopterygii
- Division: Teleostei
- Order: Cypriniformes
- Family: Gobionidae
- Genus: Platysmacheilus
- Species: P. wangcangensis

Binomial name
- Platysmacheilus wangcangensis Z.-G. Chen, Yang & Y.-S. Guo, 2021

Species of fish

Platysmacheilus wangcangensis is a species of freshwater ray-finned fish belonging to the family Gobionidae, the gudgeons. This fish occurs in the upper Yangtze River basin in Sichuan, its type locality is in Wangcang County.
