= Gobiocypris =

Conservation status
- Endangered (IUCN 3.1)

Scientific classification
- Kingdom: Animalia
- Phylum: Chordata
- Class: Actinopterygii
- Division: Teleostei
- Order: Cypriniformes
- Suborder: Cyprinoidei
- Family: Gobionidae
- Genus: Gobiocypris; M. R. Ye & T. Y. Fu, 1983
- Species: G. rarus

Binomial name
- Gobiocypris rarus M. R. Ye & T. Y. Fu, 1983

Species of fish

Gobiocypris is a monospecific genus of freshwater ray-finned fish belonging to the family Gobionidae, the gudgeons. The only species in this genus is Gobiocypris rarus (Juji fish), a fish endemic to China where it is only found near Jiuxiang in Sichuan province.

== Reproduction ==
The minimum age of reproduction is 4 months. Females reproduce during the months of March and November when temperatures are warmer. Gobiocypris rarus has a genetic sex determination system, and it can produce a large number of eggs, with a high hatching rate.
