= Coreius =

Scientific classification
- Kingdom: Animalia
- Phylum: Chordata
- Class: Actinopterygii
- Order: Cypriniformes
- Family: Gobionidae
- Genus: Coreius; D. S. Jordan & Starks, 1905

Type species
- Labeo cetopsis Kner, 1867

Synonyms
- Coripareius Garman, 1912

Genus of fishes

Coreius is a genus of freshwater ray-finned fish belonging to the family Gobionidae, the gudgeons. The fishes in this genus are endemic to freshwater habitats in China.

== Species ==
- Coreius cetopsis (Kner, 1867)
- Coreius guichenoti (Sauvage & Dabry de Thiersant, 1874)
- Coreius heterodon (Bleeker, 1864)
- Coreius septentrionalis (Nichols, 1925)
