= Paraleucogobio =

Scientific classification
- Kingdom: Animalia
- Phylum: Chordata
- Class: Actinopterygii
- Order: Cypriniformes
- Family: Gobionidae
- Genus: Paraleucogobio; Berg, 1907

Type species
- Paraleucogobio notacanthus Berg, 1907

Genus of fishes

Paraleucogobio is a genus of ray-finned fish belonging to the family Gobionidae, the gudgeons. The fishes in this genus are found in Eastern Asia.

== Species ==
Paraleucogobio contains the following species:

- Paraleucogobio notacanthus Berg, 1907
- Paraleucogobio strigatus (Regan, 1908) (Manchurian gudgeon)
