= Coreoleuciscus =

Scientific classification
- Kingdom: Animalia
- Phylum: Chordata
- Class: Actinopterygii
- Division: Teleostei
- Order: Cypriniformes
- Family: Gobionidae
- Genus: Coreoleuciscus; Mori, 1935

Type species
- Coreoleuciscus splendidus Mori, 1935

Genus of fishes

Coreoleuciscus is a genus of freshwater ray-finned fish belonging to the family Gobionidae, the gudgeons. The fishes in this genus are endemic to rivers of the Korean Peninsula.

== Species ==
There are currently 2 recognized species in this genus:

- Coreoleuciscus aeruginos H. Y. Song & I. C. Bang, 2015
- Coreoleuciscus splendidus T. Mori, 1935 (Korean splendid dace)
