= Xenophysogobio =

Scientific classification
- Kingdom: Animalia
- Phylum: Chordata
- Class: Actinopterygii
- Order: Cypriniformes
- Family: Gobionidae
- Genus: Xenophysogobio; Yi-Yu Chen & W. H. Cao, 1977

Type species
- Gobiobotia boulengeri T. L. Tchang, 1929

Genus of freshwater fish

Xenophysogobio is a genus of freshwater ray-finned fishes belonging to the family Gobionidae, the gudgeons. The fishes in this genus are endemic to China.

== Species ==
Xenophysogobio contains the following species:

- Xenophysogobio boulengeri (T. L. Tchang, 1929)
- Xenophysogobio nudicorpa (H. J. Huang & W. Zhang, 1986)
