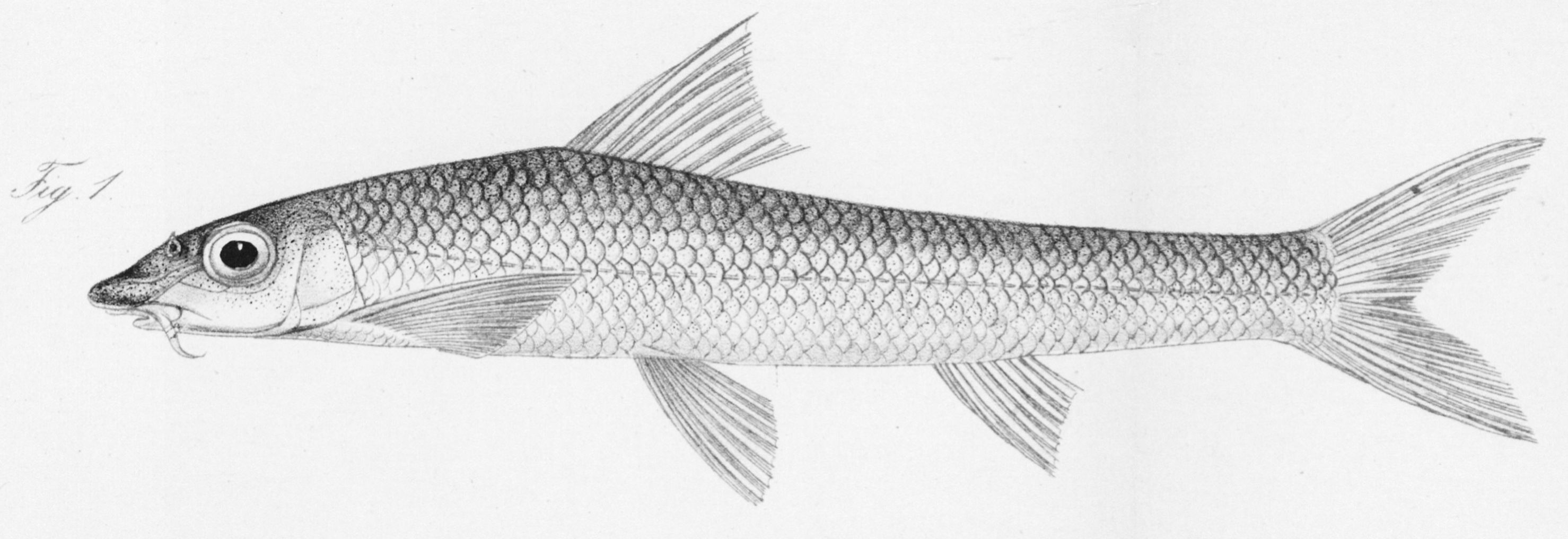
- Rhinogobio typus

Scientific classification
- Kingdom: Animalia
- Phylum: Chordata
- Class: Actinopterygii
- Order: Cypriniformes
- Family: Gobionidae
- Genus: Rhinogobio; Bleeker, 1870

Type species
- Rhinogobio typus Bleeker, 1871

Synonyms
- Megagobio Kessler, 1876; Gobio (Rhinogobioides) Rendahl, 1928

= Rhinogobio =

Genus of fishes

Rhinogobio is a genus of freshwater ray-finned fish belonging to the family Gobionidae, the gudgeons. The fishes in this genus are endemic to China.

== Species ==
There are currently five recognized species in this genus:

- Rhinogobio cylindricus Günther, 1888
- Rhinogobio hunanensis J. H. Tang, 1980
- Rhinogobio nasutus (Kessler, 1876)
- Rhinogobio typus Bleeker, 1871
- Rhinogobio ventralis Sauvage & Dabry de Thiersant, 1874
