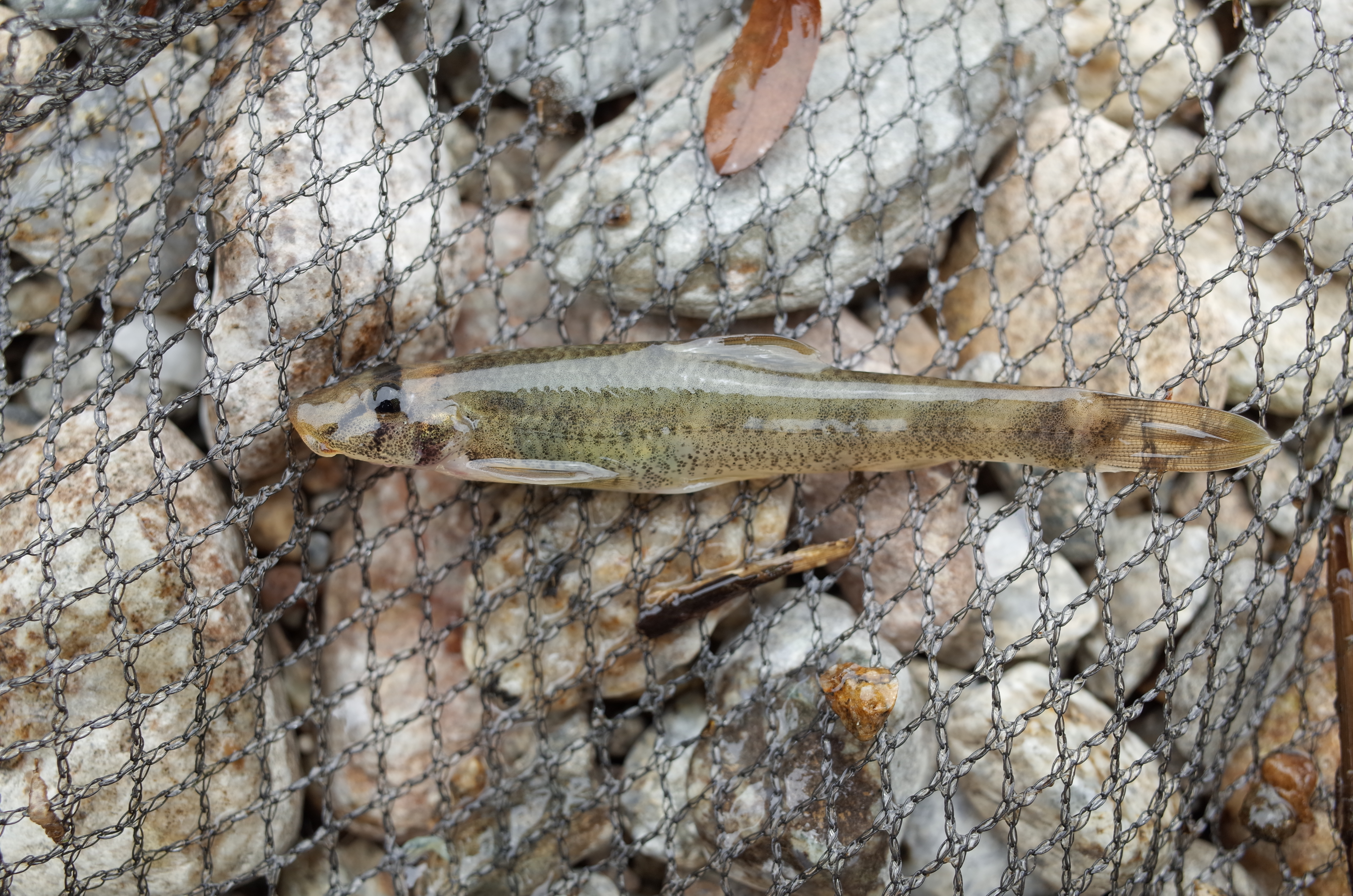
- Gobiobotia brevibarba

Scientific classification
- Kingdom: Animalia
- Phylum: Chordata
- Class: Actinopterygii
- Order: Cypriniformes
- Family: Gobionidae
- Genus: Gobiobotia; Kreyenberg, 1911

Type species
- Gobiobotia pappenheimi Kreyenberg, 1911

Synonyms
- Progobiobotia Y.-Y. Chen & W.-H. Cao, 1977

= Gobiobotia =

Genus of fishes

Gobiobotia is a genus of freshwater ray-finned fishes belonging to the family Gobionidae, the gudgeons. The species in this genus are found in eastern Asia and are typically small bottom dwellers.

== Species ==
These are the currently recognized species in this genus:

- Gobiobotia abbreviata P. W. Fang & Ki. Fu. Wang, 1931
- Gobiobotia bouommatos M. Wang, X. Chen & E. Zhang, 2024
- Gobiobotia brevibarba T. Mori, 1935
- Gobiobotia brevirostris Y.-Y. Chen & W. H. Cao, 1977
- Gobiobotia cheni Bănărescu & Nalbant, 1966
- Gobiobotia filifer (Garman, 1912)
- Gobiobotia fukiensis Bănărescu & Nalbant, 1968
- Gobiobotia guilingensis Y.-Y. Chen, 1989
- Gobiobotia homalopteroidea Rendahl (de), 1932
- Gobiobotia incarinata Wang, Chen & Zhang, 2024
- Gobiobotia intermedia Bănărescu & Nalbant, 1968
- Gobiobotia jiangxiensis E. Zhang & H. Z. Liu, 1995
- Gobiobotia kolleri Bănărescu & Nalbant, 1966
- Gobiobotia lii X. Chen, M. Wang, L. Cao & E. Zhang, 2022
- Gobiobotia longibarba P. W. Fang & Ki. Fu. Wang, 1931
- Gobiobotia macrocephala T. Mori, 1935
- Gobiobotia meridionalis Y.-Y. Chen & W. H. Cao, 1977
- Gobiobotia naktongensis T. Mori, 1935
- Gobiobotia nicholsi Bănărescu & Nalbant, 1966
- Gobiobotia pappenheimi Kreyenberg, 1911 (Eightbarbel gudgeon)
- Gobiobotia paucirastella M. L. Zheng & J. P. Yan, 1986
- Gobiobotia tungi P. W. Fang, 1933
- Gobiobotia yuanjiangensis Y.-Y. Chen & W. H. Cao, 1977
