= Mesogobio =

Scientific classification
- Kingdom: Animalia
- Phylum: Chordata
- Class: Actinopterygii
- Order: Cypriniformes
- Family: Gobionidae
- Genus: Mesogobio; Bănărescu & Nalbant, 1973

Type species
- Mesogobio lachneri Bănărescu & Nalbant, 1973

Genus of fishes

Mesogobio is a genus of freshwater ray-finned fish belonging to the family Gobionidae, the gudgeons. This fishes in this genus are found in Eastern Asia.

== Species ==
These are the currentlyrecognized species in this genus:

- Mesogobio lachneri Bănărescu & Nalbant, 1973
- Mesogobio tumenensis Y. L. Chang, 1980
