= Placogobio =

Scientific classification
- Kingdom: Animalia
- Phylum: Chordata
- Class: Actinopterygii
- Division: Teleostei
- Order: Cypriniformes
- Family: Gobionidae
- Genus: Placogobio; Nguyễn in Nguyễn & Ngô, 2002

Type species
- Placogobio nahangensis Nguyễn, 2002

Synonyms
- Supradiscus Li, Zhou, Sun & Yun, 2024

Genus of fishes

Placogobio is a genus of freshwater ray-finned fish belonging to the family Gobionidae, the gudgeons. The species in this genus native to Vietnam and China.

== Species ==
Placogobio contains the following valid species:

- Placogobio bacmeensis V. H. Nguyễn & V. B. Vo, 2002
- Placogobio basipunctatus Endruweit, 2025
- Placogobio incisorbis (L. P. Zheng, J. X. Yang & X. Y. Chen, 2016)
- Placogobio micropulvinus (W. Zhou, X. F. Pan & Kottelat, 2005)
- Placogobio nahangensis V. H. Nguyễn, 2002
- Placogobio varidiscus (Thoni & Arrindell, 2025)
