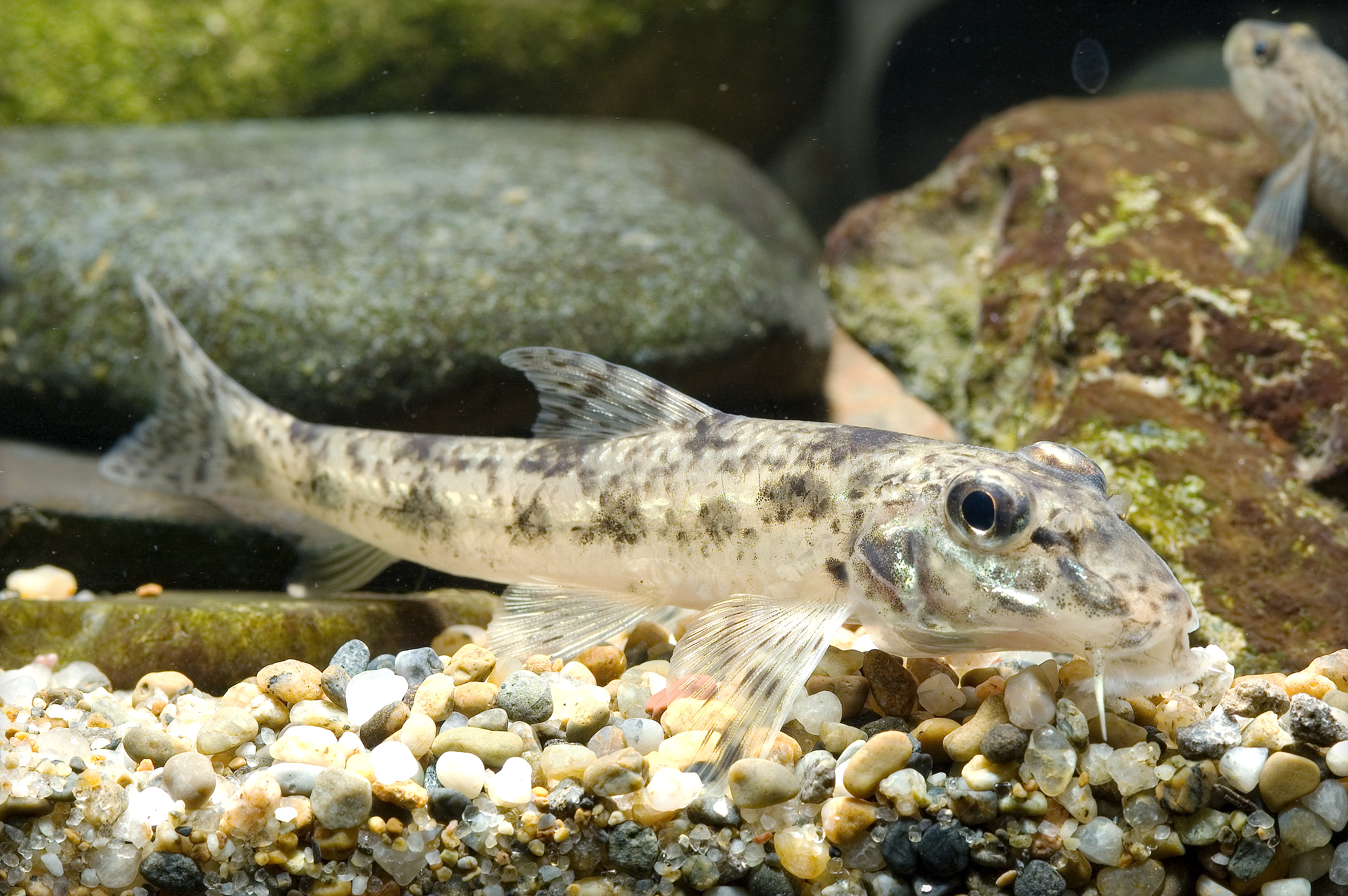
- Pseudogobio esocinus

Scientific classification
- Kingdom: Animalia
- Phylum: Chordata
- Class: Actinopterygii
- Division: Teleostei
- Order: Cypriniformes
- Family: Gobionidae
- Genus: Pseudogobio; Bleeker, 1860

Type species
- Gobio esocinus Temminck & Schlegel 1846

= Pseudogobio =

Genus of fishes

Pseudogobio is a genus of freshwater ray-finned fish belonging to the family Gobionidae, the gudgeons. The species in this genus are found in eastern Asia.

== Species ==
Pseudogobio contains the following valid species:

- Pseudogobio agathonectris Tominaga & Kawase, 2019
- Pseudogobio banggiangensis V. H. Nguyễn, 2001
- Pseudogobio esocinus (Temminck & Schlegel, 1846)
- Pseudogobio guilinensis Yao & Yang, 1977
- Pseudogobio longirostris Mori, 1934
- Pseudogobio polystictus Tominaga and Kawase, 2019
- Pseudogobio vaillanti (Sauvage, 1878)
