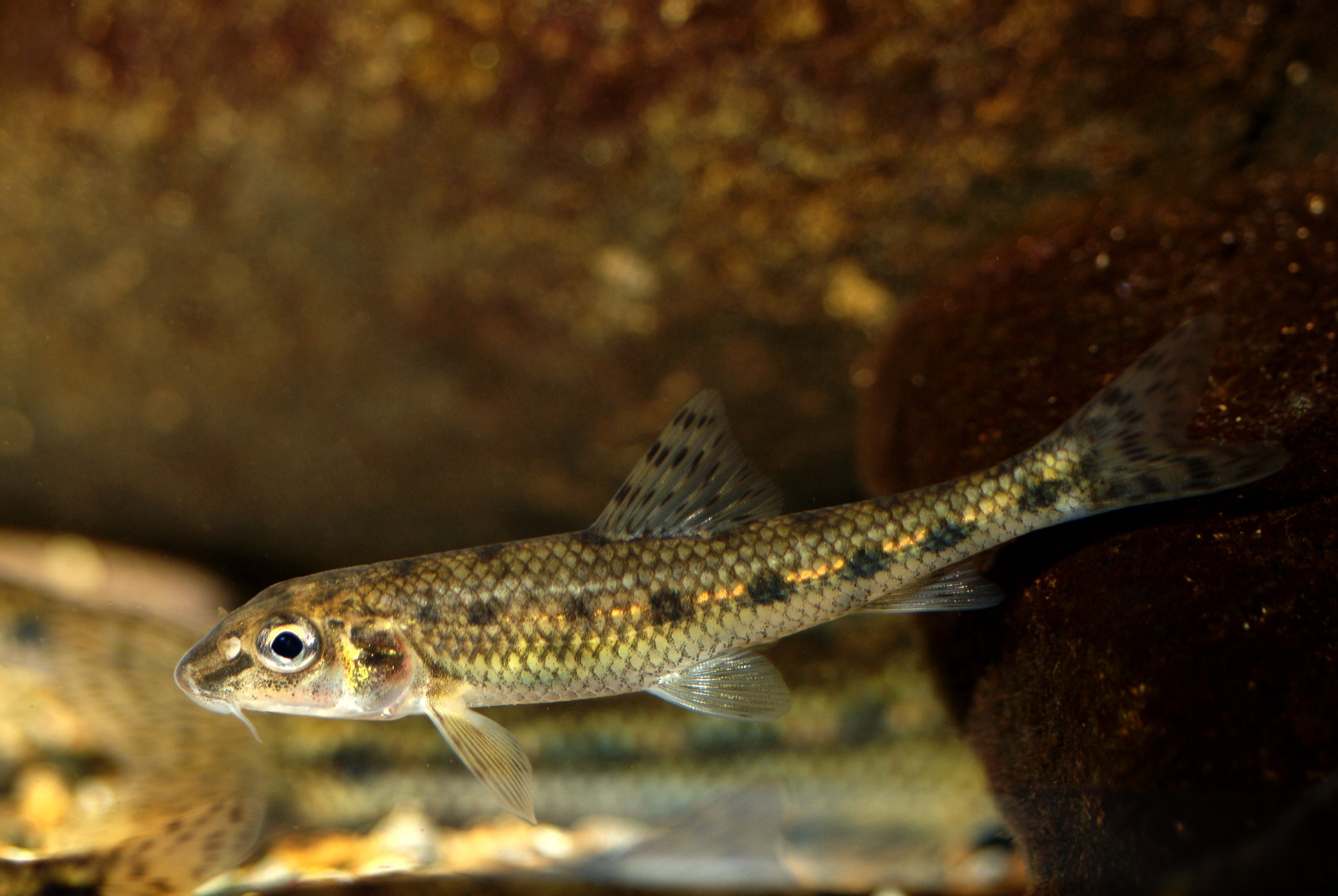
- Gobio gobio

Scientific classification
- Kingdom: Animalia
- Phylum: Chordata
- Class: Actinopterygii
- Order: Cypriniformes
- Family: Gobionidae
- Genus: Gobio; G. Cuvier, 1816

Type species
- Cyprinus gobio Linnaeus, 1758

= Gobio =

Genus of fishes

Gobio is a genus of typical gudgeons, ray-finned fish in the family Cyprinidae many of which are endemics of south-eastern Europe. Members of the genus are usually small fish, rarely longer than 10 cm.

Many species previously in Gobio are now placed in the sister genus Romanogobio.

== Species ==
These are the currently recognized species in this genus:

- Gobio acutipinnatus Men'shikov, 1939
- Gobio alverniae Kottelat & Persat 2005 (Auvergne gudgeon)
- Gobio artvinicus Turan, Japoshvili, Aksu & Bektaş, 2016
- Gobio balcanicus Dimovski & Grupche, 1977
- Gobio baliki Turan, Kaya, Bayçelebi, Aksu & Bektaş, 2017
- Gobio brevicirris Fowler, 1976 (Don gudgeon)
- Gobio bulgaricus Drensky, 1926 (Aegean gudgeon)
- Gobio carpathicus Vladykov, 1925 (Carpathian gudgeon)
- Gobio caucasicus S. N. Kamensky, 1901 (Colchic gudgeon)
- Gobio coriparoides Nichols 1925
- Gobio cynocephalus Dybowski, 1869 (Siberian gudgeon)
- Gobio fahrettini Turan, Kaya, Bayçelebi, Aksu & Bektaş, 2018
- Gobio feraeensis Stephanidis, 1973 (Thessaly gudgeon)
- Gobio fushunensis Y. H. Xie, Li & Xie, 2007 (Fushun gudgeon)
- Gobio gobio (Linnaeus, 1758) (Common gudgeon)
- Gobio gymnostethus Ladiges. 1960 (Cappadocian gudgeon)
- Gobio hettitorum Ladiges, 1960
- Gobio holurus Fowler, 1976 (Caspian gudgeon)
- Gobio huanghensis P. Q. Luo, Y.-L. Le & Y. Y. Chen, 1977
- Gobio insuyanus Ladiges, 1960. (Cihanbeyli gudgeon)
- Gobio intermedius Battalgil, 1944 (Eber gudgeon)
- Gobio kizilirmakensis Turan, Japoshvili, Aksu & Bektaş, 2016
- Gobio kovatschevi Chichkoff, 1937 (Varna gudgeon)
- Gobio krymensis Bănărescu & Nalbant, 1973 (Salgir gudgeon)
- Gobio kubanicus Vasil'eva, 2004
- Gobio latus Anikin, 1905
- Gobio lepidolaemus Kessler, 1872
- Gobio lingyuanensis T. Mori, 1934
- Gobio lozanoi Doadrio & Madeira, 2004 (Iberian gudgeon)
- Gobio macrocephalus T. Mori ,1930
- Gobio maeandricus Naseka, Erk'akan & Küçük, 2006 (Işıklı gudgeon|)
- Gobio meridionalis T. Q. Xu, 1987
- Gobio microlepidotus Battalgil, 1942 (Beyşehir gudgeon)
- Gobio multipunctatus Vasil’eva, Mamilov & Sharakhmetov, 2023
- Gobio nigrescens (Keyserling, 1861)
- Gobio obtusirostris Valenciennes, 1842
- Gobio occitaniae Kottelat & Persat, 2005
- Gobio ohridanus Karaman, 1924 (Ohrid gudgeon)
- Gobio rivuloides Nichols, 1925
- Gobio sakaryaensis Turan, Ekmekçi, Lusková & Mendel, 20122 (Sakarya gudgeon)
- Gobio sarmaticus Berg, 1949 (Ukrainian gudgeon)
- Gobio sibiricus A. M. Nikolskii, 1936
- Gobio skadarensis Karaman, 1937 (Skadar gudgeon)
- Gobio soldatovi Berg, 1914 (Soldatov's gudgeon)
- Gobio tauricus Vasil'eva, 2005
- Gobio tchangi S. C. Li, 2015
- Gobio tungussicus Borisov, 1928
- Gobio volgensis Vasil'eva, Mendel, Vasil'ev, Lusk & Lusková, 2008
