= Saurogobio =

Scientific classification
- Kingdom: Animalia
- Phylum: Chordata
- Class: Actinopterygii
- Order: Cypriniformes
- Family: Gobionidae
- Genus: Saurogobio; Bleeker, 1870

Type species
- Saurogobio dumerili Bleeker, 1871

Synonyms
- Armatogobio Taranetz, 1937; Gobiosoma Dybowski, 1872; Longurio Jordan & Starks, 1905

Genus of fishes

Saurogobio is a genus of freshwater ray-finned fishes belonging to the family Gobionidae, the gudgeons. These fishes are found in eastern Asia.

== Species ==
These are the currently recognized species in this genus:

- Saurogobio dabryi Bleeker, 1871 (Chinese lizard gudgeon)
- Saurogobio dumerili Bleeker, 1871
- Saurogobio gracilicaudatus Yao & Yang, 1977
- Saurogobio gymnocheilus Lo, Yao & Chen, 1998
- Saurogobio immaculatus Koller, 1927
- Saurogobio lissilabris Bănărescu & Nalbant, 1973
- Saurogobio punctatus Q.-Y. Tang, X.-B. Li, D. Yu, Zhu, B.-Q. Ding, Liu & Danley, 2018
- Saurogobio xiangjiangensis J. H. Tang, 1980
