= Auguste Duméril =

French zoologist (1812–1870)

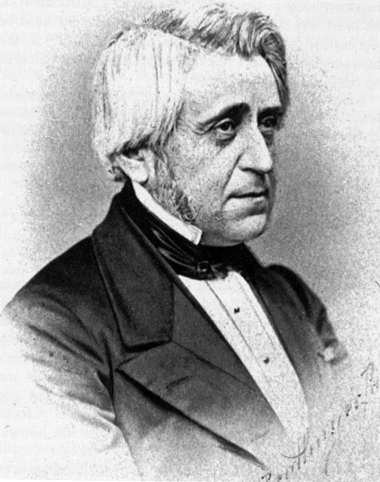
- Born: 30 November 1812; Paris, France
- Died: 12 November 1870 (aged 57); Paris, France
- Education: University of Paris
- Known for: Catalogue méthodique de la collection des Reptiles
- Father: André Marie Constant Duméril
- Scientific career
- Fields: Herpetology; Ichthyology; Zoology
- Workplaces: Muséum national d'histoire naturelle French Academy of Sciences
- Author abbrev. (zoology): Duméril

Auguste Henri André Duméril (30 November 1812 – 12 November 1870) was a French zoologist. His father, André Marie Constant Duméril (1774–1860), was also a zoologist. In 1869 he was elected as a member of the Académie des sciences.

Duméril studied at the University of Paris, and in 1844 became an associate professor of comparative physiology at the university. From 1857, he was a professor of herpetology and ichthyology at the Muséum National d'Histoire Naturelle in Paris.

In 1851, with his father, he published Catalogue méthodique de la collection des Reptiles. With zoologist Marie Firmin Bocourt (1819–1904), he collaborated on a project called Mission scientifique au Mexique et dans l'Amérique Centrale, a publication that was the result of Bocourt's scientific expedition to Mexico and Central America from 1864 to 1866. The section on reptiles is considered to be Dumeril's best written effort in the field of herpetology. Duméril died in 1870 during the siege of Paris, and Mission scientifique au Mexique et dans l'Amérique Centrale was continued by Bocourt, Léon Vaillant (1834–1914) and other scientists.

As part of the Collection des Suites à Buffon, he issued a two-volume ichthyological study titled Histoire naturelle des poissons, ou Ichtyologie générale (1865, 1870), research that complemented the works of Georges Cuvier (1769–1832) and Achille Valenciennes (1794–1865) by describing species not covered by the two famous naturalists. Duméril also conducted significant research involving the axolotl (Ambystoma mexicanum).

== Tribute ==
Saurogobio dumerili Bleeker 1871 was named in honor of Duméril, who invited Bleeker to examine Chinese cyprinids in the Muséum national d’Histoire naturelle’s collection.

== See also ==
- Category:Taxa named by Auguste Duméril
