= Platysmacheilus =

Scientific classification
- Kingdom: Animalia
- Phylum: Chordata
- Class: Actinopterygii
- Order: Cypriniformes
- Family: Gobionidae
- Genus: Platysmacheilus; Y. L. Lu, P. Q. Luo & Yi-Yu Chen, 1977

Type species
- Saurogobio exiguus Lin, 1932

Genus of fishes

Platysmacheilus is a genus of freshwater ray-finned fish belonging to the family Gobionidae, the gudgeons. The species in this genus are endemic to China.

== Species ==
Platysmaccheilus contains the following species:

- Platysmacheilus exiguus (S. Y. Lin, 1932)
- Platysmacheilus longibarbatus Y. L. Lu, P. Q. Luo & Yi-Yu Chen, 1977
- Platysmacheilus nudiventris P. Q. Luo, Lu & Yi-Yu Chen, 1977
- Platysmacheilus obtusirostris (H.-S. Wu & K.-F. Wang, 1931)
- Platysmacheilus wangcangensis Z.-G. Chen, Yang & Y.-S. Guo, 2021
- Platysmacheilus zhenjiangensis Y. Ni, X. H. Chen & G. Zhou, 2005

== Sources ==
- Froese, Rainer; Pauly, Daniel (eds.). "Species in genus Platysmacheilus". FishBase. August 2011 version.
