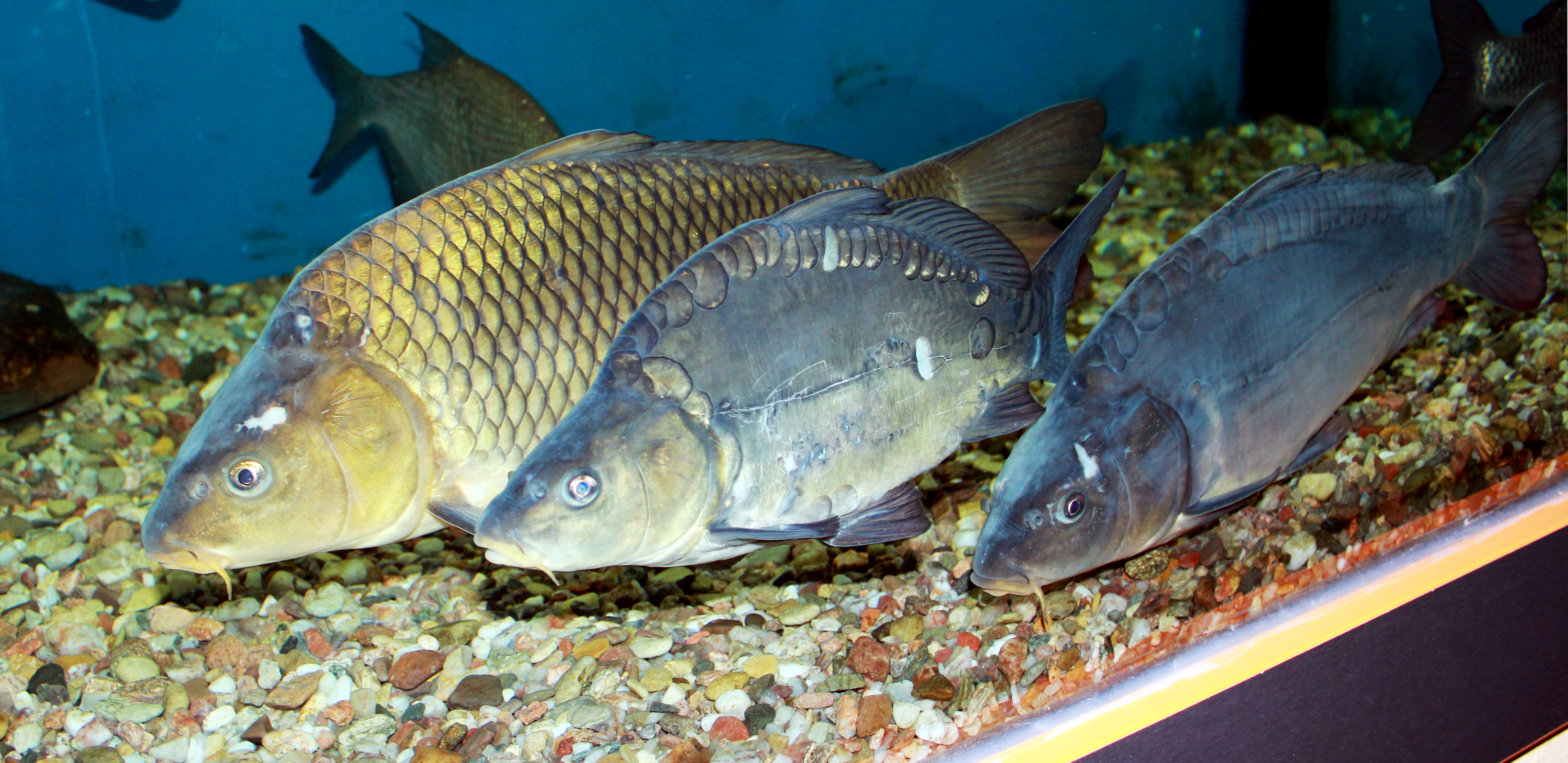
- Common carp (Cyprinus carpio)
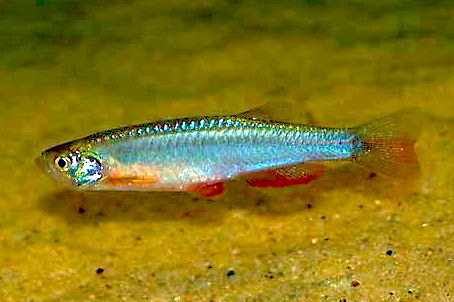
- Pearl danio (Danio albolineatus)

Scientific classification
- Kingdom: Animalia
- Phylum: Chordata
- Class: Actinopterygii
- Order: Cypriniformes
- Suborder: Cyprinoidei; Fitzinger, 1832

= Cyprinoidei =

Cyprinoidei Temporal range: Eocene–present

Suborder of fishes

Cyprinoidei is a suborder, or superfamily, of primarily pelagic, freshwater ray-finned fishes nestled within the larger order Cypriniformes. Many fishes in this group include the carps, danionins, and minnows, and are readily found and raised in aquaculture owing to their hardiness and tolerance of extreme water parameters.

Cyprinoidei was formerly a monotypic grouping only containing a single large family, the Cyprinidae, but this has now been divided into a number of many sister taxa.

== Families ==
The following sister families are included within the Cyprinoidei:

- Suborder Cyprinoidei Fitzinger, 1832
  - Family Paedocyprididae Mayden & W.J. Chen, 2010 ("little carps")
  - Family Psilorhynchidae Hora, 1926 (mountain carps)
  - Family Cyprinidae Rafinesque, 1815 (true carps, barbs)
  - Family Sundadanionidae Mayden & Chen, 2010 (tiny danios)
  - Family Danionidae Bleeker, 1863 (danionins)
  - Family Leptobarbidae Bleeker, 1864 (cigar barbs)
  - Family Xenocyprididae Günther, 1868 (East Asian minnows/sharpbellies)
  - Family Tincidae D. S. Jordan, 1878 (tenches)
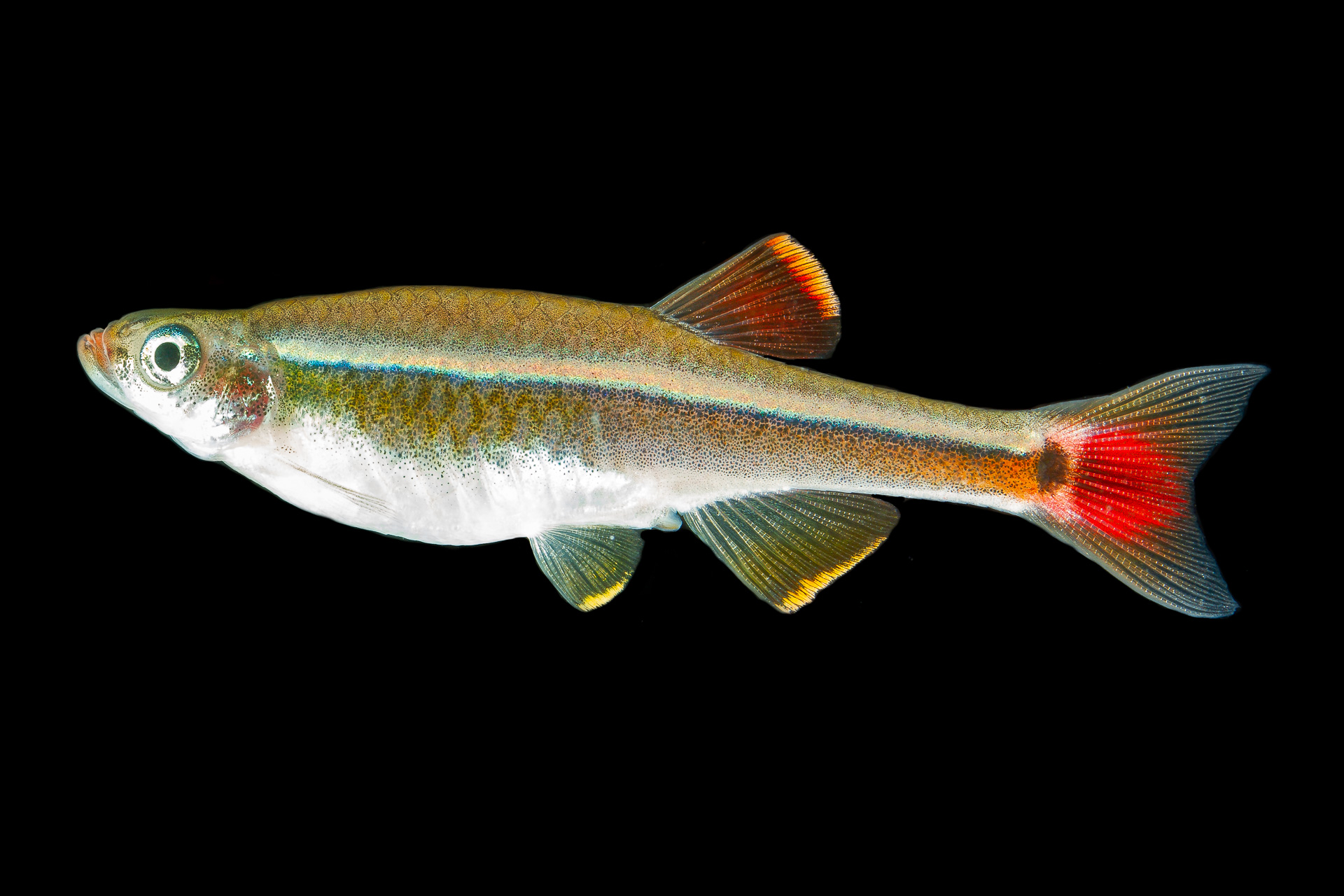
    Tanichthys albonubes
  - Family Acheilognathidae Bleeker, 1863 (bitterlings)
  - Family Gobionidae Bleeker, 1863 (freshwater gudgeons)
  - Family Tanichthyidae Mayden & Chen, 2010 (mountain minnows)
  - Family Leuciscidae Bonaparte, 1835 (true minnows, shiners, daces)
