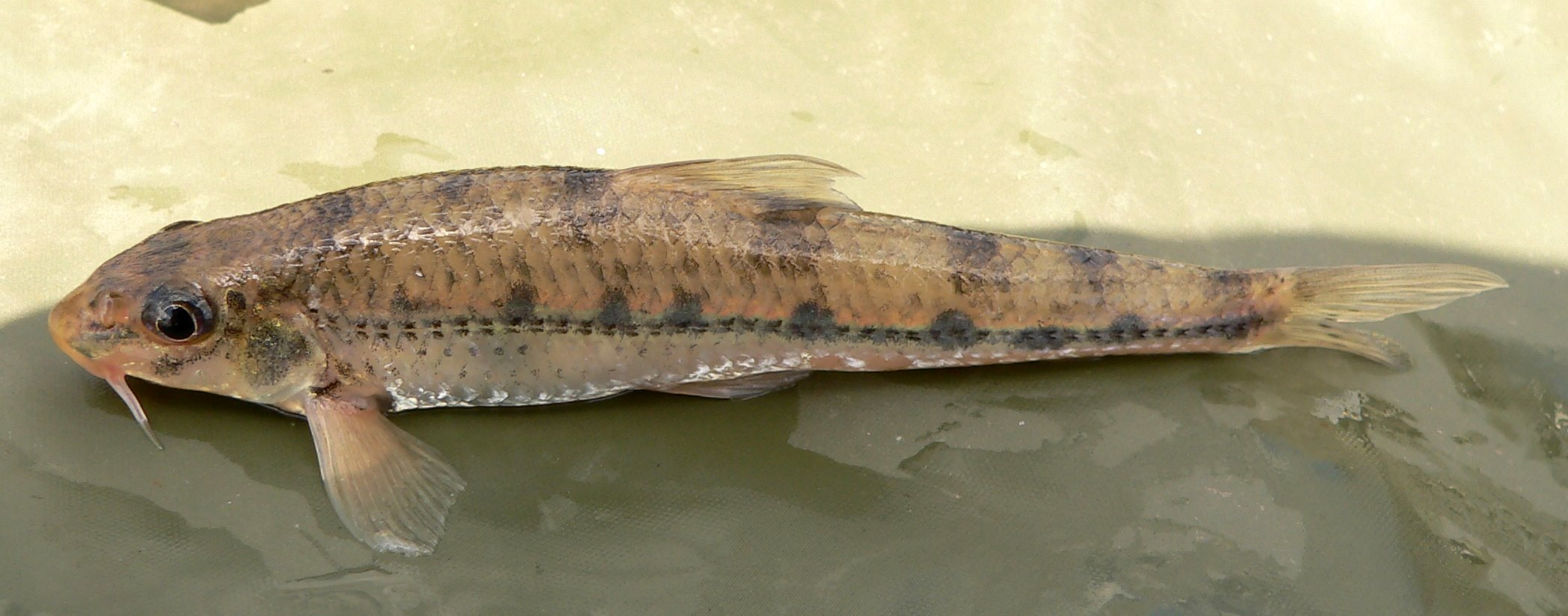
- A white-finned gudgeon (Romanogobio belingi)

Scientific classification
- Kingdom: Animalia
- Phylum: Chordata
- Class: Actinopterygii
- Division: Teleostei
- Order: Cypriniformes
- Suborder: Cyprinoidei
- Family: Gobionidae; Bleeker, 1863

= Gobionidae =

Gobionidae Temporal range: Middle Eocene–present

Family of fishes

Gobionidae is a monophyletic family of benthic Eurasian cyprinoid fishes. This is a species rich clade which, as a subfamily of the Cyprinidae was divided into five tribes: Gobionini, Pseudogobionini, Hemibarbini, Coreiini, and Sarcocheilichthyini. These subdivisions are not recognised by Eschmeyer's Catalog of Fishes.

To adapt to different masticatory operations (food processing), members of the Gobioninae developed various types of pharyngeal bones and associated teeth; some have intermediate pharyngeal bones with rows of diverse teeth (conical, compressed, and coarsely compressed), others have broad pharyngeal bones with a single row of molariform teeth. Some Gobioninae have narrow pharyngeal bones with a row of extremely compressed teeth.

== Genera ==
These genera are included in the subfamily Gobioninae according to Eschmeyer's Catalog of Fishes:

- Abbottina D. S. Jordan & Fowler, 1903
- Acanthogobio Herzenstein, 1892
- Belligobio D. S. Jordan & Hubbs, 1925
- Biwia D. S. Jordan & Fowler, 1903
- Coreius D. S. Jordan & Starks, 1905
- Coreoleuciscus Mori, 1935
- Gnathopogon Bleeker, 1860
- Gobio Cuvier, 1816
- Gobiobotia Kreyenberg, 1911
- Gobiocypris M. R. Ye & T. Y. Fu, 1983
- Hemibarbus Bleeker, 1860
- Ladislavia Dybowski, 1869
- Mesogobio Bănărescu & Nalbant, 1973
- Microphysogobio Mori, 1934
- Paracanthobrama Bleeker, 1864
- Paraleucogobio Berg, 1907
- Placogobio V. H. Nguyễn, 2002
- Platysmacheilus Y. L. Lu, P. Q. Luo & Yi-Yu Chen, 1977
- Pseudogobio Bleeker, 1860
- Pseudopungtungia Mori, 1935
- Pseudorasbora Bleeker, 1860
- Pungtungia Herzenstein, 1892
- Rhinogobio Bleeker, 1870
- Romanogobio Bănărescu 1961
- Sarcocheilichthys Bleeker, 1860
- Saurogobio Bleeker, 1870
- Squalidus Dybowski, 1872
- Xenophysogobio Yi-Yu Chen & W. H. Cao, 1977

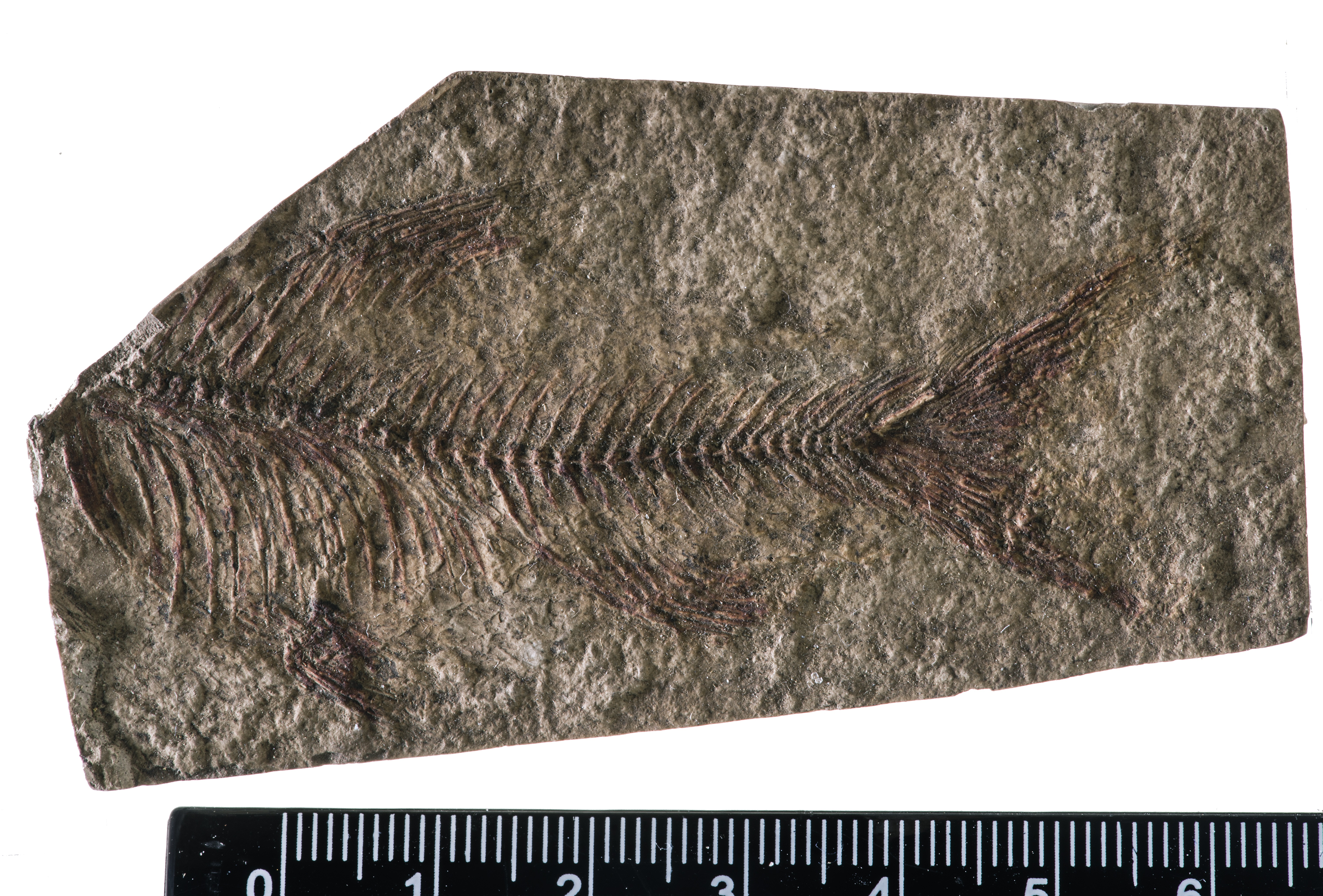
Partial fossil skeleton of Varhostichthys

The earliest known fossil gobionine is †Palaeogobio Zhou, 1990 from the Middle Eocene of Henan, China. The extinct gobionines †Protothymallus Laube, 1901 and †Varhostichthys Obrhelová, 1969 are known from the Early to Late Oligocene of Europe.
