= List of freshwater fishes of Korea =

This is a list of species of fish found in the rivers and lakes of the Korean Peninsula.

== Lampreys ==
1. Eudontomyzon morii (Berg, 1931) – Korean lamprey (칠성말배꼽)
2. Lethenteron camtschaticum (Tilesius, 1811) – Arctic lamprey (칠성장어)
3. Lethenteron reissneri (Dybowski, 1869) – Far Eastern brook lamprey (다묵장어)

== Sturgeons and paddlefish ==
1. Acipenser dabryanus (Dumeril, 1868) – Yangtze sturgeon (칼상어)
2. Acipenser medirostris (Ayres, 1854) – green sturgeon (용상어)
3. Acipenser sinensis (Gray, 1834) – Chinese sturgeon (철갑상어)

== Eels ==
1. Anguilla japonica (Schlegel, 1846) – Japanese eel (뱀장어)
2. Anguilla marmorata (Quoy and Gaiamard, 1824) – marbled eel (무태장어)

== Herring ==
1. Coilia mystus (Linnaeus, 1758) – tapertail anchovy (싱어)
2. Coilia nasus (Temminck et Schlegel, 1846) – Japanese grenadier anchovy (웅어)
3. Konosirus punctatus (Temminck et Schlegel, 1846) – dotted gizzard shad (전어)
4. Sardinella zunasi (Bleeker, 1854) – Japanese sardinella (밴댕이)

== Carp, minnows and loaches ==
1. Abbottina rivularis (Basilewsky, 1855) – Chinese false gudgeon (버들매치)
2. Abbottina springeri (Banarescu et Nalbant, 1973) (왜매치)
3. Acanthorhodeus chankaensis (Dybowski, 1872) – Khanka spiny bitterling (가시납지리)
4. Acanthorhodeus macropterus Bleeker, 1871 (큰납지리)
5. jordan secker fish (Jordan et Metz, 1913) (서호납줄갱이)
6. Acheilognathus koreensis (Kim et Kim, 1990) (칼납자루)
7. Acheilognathus majusculus (Kim et Yang, 1998) (큰줄납자루)
8. Acheilognathus rhombeus (Temminck et Schlegel, 1846) (납지리)
9. Acheilognathus signifer (Berg, 1907) (묵납자루)
10. Acheilognathus somjinensis (Kim et Kim, 1991) (임실납자루)
11. Acheilognathus yamatsutae (Mori, 1928) (줄납자루)
12. Aphyocypris chinensis (Günther, 1868) – Chinese bleak (왜몰개)
13. Barbatula nuda (Bleeker, 1865) (대륙종개)
14. Barbatula toni (Dybowski, 1869) – bearded stone loach (종개)
15. Carassius carassius (Linnaeus, 1758) – crucian carp (붕어)
16. Carassius cuvieri (Temminck et Schlegel, 1846) – Japanese crucian carp (떡붕어)
17. Chanodichthys erythropterus (Basilewsky, 1855) – redfin culter (강준치)
18. Cobitis lutheri (Rendahl, 1935) – Luther's spiny loach (점줄종개)
19. Cobitis pacifica (Kim, Park, et Nalbant, 1999) (북방종개)
20. Cobitis sinensis (Sauvage et Dabryi, 1874) – Siberian spiny loach (기름종개)
21. Cobitis tetralineata (Kim, Park, et Nalbant, 1999) (줄종개)
22. Coreius heterodon (Bleeker, 1865) – brass gudgeon (게톱치)
23. Coreoleuciscus splendidus (Mori, 1935) – Korean splendid dace (쉬리)
24. Ctenopharyngodon idella (Cuvier et Valenciennes) – grass carp (초어)
25. Cyprinus carpio (Linnaeus, 1758) – common carp (잉어)
26. Gnathopogon strigatus (Regan, 1908) – striped false gudgeon (줄몰개)
27. Gobiobotia brevibarba (Mori, 1935) (돌상어)
28. Gobiobotia macrocephala (Mori, 1935) (꾸구리)
29. Gobiobotia naktongensis (Mori, 1935) (흰수마자)
30. Gobio cynocephalus (Dybowski, 1869) – Siberian gudgeon (모샘치)
31. Hemibarbus labeo (Pallas, 1707) – steed barbel (누치)
32. Hemibarbus longirostris (Regan, 1908) – long-nosed barbel (참마자)
33. Hemibarbus mylodon (Berg, 1907) – spotted barbel (어름치)
34. Hemiculter leucisculus (Basilewsky, 1855) – sharpbelly (살치)
35. Hypophthalmichthys molitrix (Cuvier et Valenciennes) – silver carp (백련어)
36. Hypophthalmichthys nobilis (Richardson, 1845) – bighead carp (대두어)
37. Iksookimia choii (Kim et Son, 1984) – Miho spine loach (미호종개)
38. Iksookimia koreensis (Kim, 1975) – Korean spine loach (참종개)
39. Iksookimia longicorpa (Kim, Choi, et Nalbant, 1976) (왕종개)
40. Iksookimia pumila (Kim et Lee, 1987) – Puan spine loach (부안종개)
41. Iksookimia yongdokensis (Kim et Park, 1997) (동방종개)
42. Kichulchoia brevifasciata (Kim et Lee, 1996) – dwarf loach (좀수수치)
43. Koreocobitis naktongensis (Kim, Park, et Nalbant, 2000) – Nakdong nose loach (얼룩새코미꾸리)
44. Koreocobitis rotundicaudata (Wakiya et Mori, 1929) – white nose loach (새코미꾸리)
45. Ladislavia taczanowskii (Dybowski, 1869) – Tachanovsky's gudgeon (새미)
46. Lefua costata (Kessler, 1876) – eightbarbel loach (쌀미꾸리)
47. Leuciscus waleckii (Dybowski, 1869) – Amur ide (야레)
48. Mesogobio lachneri (Banarescu et Nalbant, 1973) (압록자그사니)
49. Mesogobio tumensis (Chang, 1979) (두만강자그사니)
50. Microphysogobio jeoni (Kim et Yang, 1999) (됭경모치)
51. Microphysogobio koreensis (Mori, 1935) (모래주사)
52. Microphysogobio longidorsalis (Mori, 1935) (배가사리)
53. Microphysogobio rapidus (Chae et Yang, 1999) (여울마자)
54. Microphysogobio yaluensis (Mori, 1928) (돌마자)
55. Misgurnus anguillicaudatus (Cantor, 1842) – pond loach (미꾸리)
56. Misgurnus mizolepis (Günther, 1888) – Chinese fine-scaled loach (미꾸라지)
57. Nipponocypris temminckii (Temminck & Schlegel, 1846) – dark chub (갈겨니)
58. Niwaella multifasciata (Wakiya et Mori, 1929) (수수미꾸리)
59. Opsariichthys uncirostris (Temminck & Schlegel, 1846) – three-lips (끄리)
60. Phoxinus kumgangensis (Kim, 1980) – Kumgang fat minnow (금강모치)
61. Phoxinus phoxinus (Linnaeus, 1758) – common minnow (연준모치)
62. Phoxinus semotilus (Jordan & Starks, 1905) (버들가지)
63. Pseudogobio esocinus (Temminck et Schlegel, 1846) (모래무지)
64. Pseudopungtungia nigra (Mori, 1935) – black shiner (감돌고기)
65. Pseudopungtungia tenuicorpus (Jeon et Choi, 1980) – slender shiner (가는돌고기)
66. Pseudorasbora parva (Temminck et Schlegel, 1846) – stone moroko (참붕어)
67. Pungtungia herzi (Herzenstein, 1892) – striped shiner (돌고기)
68. Rhynchocypris oxycephalus (Sauvage et Darby, 1874) – Chinese minnow (버들치)
69. Rhynchocypris percnurus (Pallas, 1811) – swamp minnow (동버들개)
70. Rhynchocypris steindachneri (Dybowski, 1869) – Amur minnow (버들개)
71. Rhodeus ocellatus (Kner, 1867) – rosy bitterling (흰줄납줄개)
72. Rhodeus pseudosericeus (Arai, Jeon, et Ueda) (한강납줄개)
73. Rhodeus notatus (Nichols, 1929) (떡납줄갱이)
74. Rhodeus uyekii (Mori, 1935) (각시붕어)
75. Sarcocheilichthys czerskii (Berg, 1914) – Chersky's thicklip gudgeon (북방중고기)
76. Sarcocheilichthys nigripinnis (Jordan et Hubbs, 1925) – rainbow gudgeon (중고기)
77. Sarcocheilichthys variegatus (Mori, 1927) (참중고기)
78. Saurogobio dabryi (Bleeker, 1871) – Chinese lizard gudgeon (두우쟁이)
79. Squalidus chankaensis Dybowski, 1872 (참몰개)
80. Squalidus gracilis (Temminck and Schlegel, 1846) (긴몰개)
81. Squalidus japonicus (Sauvage, 1883) (몰개)
82. Squalidus multimaculatus (Hosoya et Jeon, 1984) – spotted-barbel gudgeon (점몰개)
83. Squaliobarbus curriculus (Richardson, 1846) – barbel chub (눈불개)
84. Tanakia lanceolata (Temminck et Schlegel, 1846) (납자루)
85. Tribolodon brandtii (Dybowski, 1872) – Pacific redfin (대황어)
86. Tribolodon hakonensis (Günther, 1880) – sea rundace (황어)
87. Zacco platypus (Temminck et Schlegel, 1846) – pale chub (피라미)

== Catfish ==
1. Ictalurus punctatus (Rafinesque, 1818) – channel catfish (찬넬동자개)
2. Leiocassis longirostris (Günther, 1864) – Chinese longsnout catfish (종어)
3. Liobagrus andersoni (Regan, 1908) (퉁가리)
4. Liobagrus mediadiposalis (Mori, 1936) – south torrent catfish (자가사리)
5. Liobagrus obesus (Son, Kim, et Choo, 1987) – bullhead torrent catfish (퉁사리)
6. Pelteobagrus ussuriensis (Dybowski, 1872) – Ussurian bullhead (대농갱이)
7. Pseudobagrus brevicorpus (Mori, 1936) – Korean stumpy bullhead (꼬치동자개)
8. Pseudobagrus koreanus (Uchida, 1990) – black bullhead (눈동자개)
9. Silurus asotus (Linnaeus, 1758) – Amur catfish (메기)
10. Silurus microdorsalis (Mori, 1936) – slender catfish (미유기)
11. Tachysurus fulvidraco (Richardson, 1846) – yellow catfish (동자개)
12. Tachysurus nitidus (Sauvage et Dabryi, 1874) (밀자개)

== Smelt ==
1. Hypomesus nipponensis (McAllister, 1963) – wakasagi (빙어)
2. Neosalanx anderssoni (Rendahl, 1923) – Andersson's icefish (도화뱅어)
3. Neosalanx hubbsi (Wakiya et Takahashi, 1937) (실뱅어)
4. Neosalanx jordani (Wakiya et Takahashi, 1937) (젓뱅어)
5. Plecoglossus altivelis (Temminck et Schlegel, 1846) – ayu (은어)
6. Protosalanx chinensis (Basilewsky, 1855) (붕퉁뱅어)
7. Salangichthys microdon (Bleeker, 1860) – Japanese icefish (뱅어)
8. Salanx ariakensis (Kishinouye, 1901) – Ariake icefish (국수뱅어)
9. Salanx prognathus (Regan, 1908) (벚꽃뱅어)

== Salmonids ==
1. Brachymystax lenok (Pallas, 1773) – lenok (열목어)
2. Hucho ishikawae (Mori, 1928) – Korean taimen (자치)
3. Oncorhynchus gorbuscha (Walbaum, 1792) – pink salmon (곱사연어)
4. Oncorhynchus keta (Walbaum, 1792) – chum salmon (연어)
5. Oncorhynchus kisutch (Walbaum, 1792) – coho salmon (은연어)
6. Oncorhynchus masou (Brevoort, 1856) – masu salmon (송어)
7. Oncorhynchus mykiss (Walbaum, 1792) – rainbow trout (무지개송어)
8. Salvelinus leucomaenis (Pallas, 1811) – white-spotted char (홍송어)
9. Salvelinus malma (Walbaum, 1792) – Dolly Varden (곤들매기)
10. Thymallus yaluensis (Mori, 1928) (사루기)

== Cod ==
1. Lota lota (Linnaeus, 1758) – burbot (모오캐)

== Mullets ==
1. Liza affinis (Günther, 1861) – eastern keelback mullet (등줄숭어)
2. Liza haematocheilus (Temminck et Schlegel, 1845) – haarder (가숭어)
3. Mugil cephalus (Linnaeus, 1758) – flathead mullet (숭어)

== Perch-like fish ==
1. Acanthogobius elongatus (Ni et Wu, 1985) (왜풀망둑)
2. Acanthogobius flavimanus (Temminck et Schlegel, 1845) – yellowfin goby (문절망둑)
3. Acanthogobius lactipes (Hilgendorf, 1879) (흰발망둑)
4. Acanthogobius luridus (Ni et Wu, 1985) (비늘흰발망둑)
5. Acentrogobius pellidebilis (Lee et Kim, 1992) (점줄망둑)
6. Acentrogobius pflaumii (Bleeker, 1853) – striped sand goby (줄망둑)
7. Bathygobius fuscus (Ruppel, 1830) – dusky frillgoby (무늬망둑)
1. Boleophthalmus pectinirostris (Linnaeus, 1758) – blue-spotted mudskipper (짱뚱어)
2. Channa argus (Cantor, 1842) – northern snakehead (가물치)
3. Coreoperca herzi (Herzenstein, 1896) – Korean perch (꺽지)
4. Coreoperca kawamebari (Temminck et Schlegel, 1842) – Japanese aucha perch (꺽저기)
5. Eleotris oxycephala (Temminck et Schlegel, 1845) – spined sleeper (구굴무치)
6. Favonigobius gymnauchen (Bleeker, 1860) – sharp-nosed sand goby (날개망둑)
7. Gymnogobius castaneus (O'Shaughnessy, 1875) – biringo (날망둑)
8. Gymnogobius macrognathos (Bleeker, 1860) - (왜꾹저구)
9. Gymnogobius urotaenia (Hilgendorf, 1879) (꾹저구)
10. Lateolabrax japonicus (Cuvier, 1828) – suzuki (농어)
11. Lepomis macrochirus (Rafinesque, 1819) – bluegill (블루길)
12. Leucopsarion petersii (Hilgendorf, 1880) – ice goby (서백어)
13. Luciogobius guttatus (Gill, 1859) – flat-headed goby (미끈망둑)
14. Macropodus ocellatus (Cantor, 1842) – roundtail paradisefish (버들붕어)
15. Micropercops swinhonis (Gunther, 1873) (좀구굴치)
16. Micropterus salmoides (Lacépède, 1802) – largemouth bass (베스)
17. Mugilogobius abei (Jordan et Snyder, 1901) – Abe's mangrove goby (모치망둑)
18. Mugilogobius fontinalis (Jordan et Seale, 1906) (제주모치망둑)
19. Nuchequula nuchalis (Temminck et Schlegel, 1845) – spotnape ponyfish (주둥치)
20. Odontamblyopus lacepedii (Temminck et Schlegel, 1845) (개소겡)
21. Odontobutis interrupta (Iwata et Jeon, 1985) (얼록동사리)
22. Odontobutis obscura (Temminck et Schlegel, 1845) – donko (남방동사리)
23. Odontobutis platycephala (Iwata et Jeon, 1985) (동사리)
24. Oreochromis niloticus (Linnaeus, 1758) – Nile tilapia (나일틸라피아)
25. Paratrypauchen microcephalus (Bleeker, 1860) – comb goby (빨갱이)
26. Parioglossus dotui (Tomiyama, 1958) (꼬마청황)
27. Periopthalmus magnuspinnatus (Lee, Choi, et Ryu, 1995) (큰볏말뚝망둥어)
28. Periophthalmus modestus (Cantor, 1842) – Shuttles hoppfish (말뚝망둥어)
29. Pseudogobius masago (Tomiyama, 1936) (애기망둑)
30. Repomucenus olidus (Gunther, 1873) (강주걱양태)
31. Rhinogobius brunneus (Temminck et Schlegel, 1845) – Amur goby (밀어)
32. Rhinogobius giurinus (Rutter, 1897) – barcheek goby (갈문망둑)
33. Sicyopterus japonicus (Tanaka, 1909) – grazing goby (열동갈문절)
34. Siniperca scherzeri (Steindachner, 1892) – golden mandarin fish (쏘가리)
35. Synechogobius hasta (Temminck et Schlegel, 1845) – javelin goby (풀망둑)
36. Tridentiger bifasciatus (Steindachner, 1881) – Shimofuri goby (민물두줄망둑)
37. Tridentiger brevispinis (Katsuyama, Arai, et Nakamura, 1972) (민물검정망둑)
38. Tridentiger nudicervicus (Tomiyama, 1934) – bare-naped goby (황줄망둑)
39. Tridentiger obscurus (Temminck et Schlegel, 1845) – dusky tripletooth goby (검정망둑)

== Needlefish and ricefish ==
1. Hyporhamphus intermedius (Cantor, 1842) – Asian pencil halfbeak (줄공치)
2. Hyporhamphus sajori (Temminck et Schlegel, 1845) – Japanese halfbeak (학공치)
3. Oryzias latipes (Temminck et Schlegel, 1846) – Japanese rice fish (송사리)
4. Oryzias sinensis (Chen, Uwa, et Chu, 1989) – Chinese rice fish (대륙송사리)

== Sticklebacks ==
1. Gasterosteus aculeatus (Linnaeus, 1758) – three-spined stickleback (큰가시고기)
2. Pungitius pungitius (Linnaeus, 1758) – ninespine stickleback (청가시고기)
3. Pungitius sinensis (Guichenot, 1869) – Amur stickleback (가시고기)
4. Pungitius tymensis (Nikolsky, 1889) – Sakhalin stickleback (두만가시고기)
5. Syngnathus schlegeli (Kaup, 1856) – seaweed pipefish (실고기)

== Swamp eels ==
1. Monopterus albus (Zuiew, 1793) – rice eel (드렁허리)

== Scorpionfish, flatheads and sculpins ==
1. Cottus czerskii (Berg, 1913) – Chersky's sculpin (참둑중개)
2. Cottus hangiongensis (Mori, 1930) (한둑중개)
3. Cottus poecilopus (Heckel, 1837) – alpine bullhead (둑중개)
4. Myoxocephalus stelleri (Tilesius, 1811) – Steller's sculpin (개구리꺽정이)
5. Platycephalus indicus (Linnaeus, 1758) – bartail flathead (양태)
6. Sebastes schlegeli (Hilgendorf, 1880) – Korean rockfish (조피볼락)
7. Trachidermus fasciatus (Heckel, 1837) – roughskin sculpin (꺽정이)

== Flatfish ==
1. Cynoglossus semilaevis (Gunther, 1873) – tongue sole (박대)
2. Kareius bicoloratus (Basilewsky, 1855) – stone flounder (돌가자미)
3. Platichthys stellatus (Pallas, 1788) – starry flounder (강도다리)
4. Pleuronichthys cornutus (Temminck et Schlegel, 1846) – ridged-eye flounder (도다리)

== Puffers ==
1. Takifugu niphobles (Jordan et Snyder, 1901) – grass puffer (복섬)
2. Takifugu obscurus (Abe, 1949) – obscure pufferfish (황복)
3. Takifugu poecilonotus (Temminck et Schlegel, 1850) – finepatterned puffer (흰점복)
4. Takifugu rubripes (Temminck et Schlegel, 1850) – Japanese pufferfish (자주복)
5. Takifugu vermicularis (Temminck et Schlegel, 1850) – purple puffer (매리복)
6. Takifugu xanthopterus (Temminck et Schlegel, 1850) – yellowfin pufferfish (까치복)

== See also ==
- List of amphibians of Korea
- List of reptiles of Korea
- List of mammals of Korea
- List of passerine birds of Korea
- List of non-passerine birds of Korea
