= Microphysogobio hsinglungshanensis =

Scientific classification
- Kingdom: Animalia
- Phylum: Chordata
- Class: Actinopterygii
- Order: Cypriniformes
- Suborder: Cyprinoidei
- Family: Gobionidae
- Genus: Microphysogobio
- Species: M. hsinglungshanensis

Binomial name
- Microphysogobio hsinglungshanensis Mori, 1934

Species of fish

Microphysogobio hsinglungshanensis is a species of freshwater ray-finned fish belonging to the family Gobionidae, the gudgeons. This species is endemic to China.
