= Pseudopungtungia =

Scientific classification
- Kingdom: Animalia
- Phylum: Chordata
- Class: Actinopterygii
- Order: Cypriniformes
- Family: Gobionidae
- Genus: Pseudopungtungia; T. Mori, 1935

Type species
- Pseudopungtungia nigra T. Mori, 1935

Genus of fishes

Pseudopungtungia is a genus of freshwater ray-finned fish belonging to the family Gobionidae, the gudgeons. The species in this genus are found in Korea.

== Species ==
Pseudopungtungia contains the following valid species:

- Pseudopungtungia nigra T. Mori, 1935 (Black shinner)
- Pseudopungtungia tenuicorpus S. R. Jeon & K. C. Choi, 1980 (Slender shinner)
