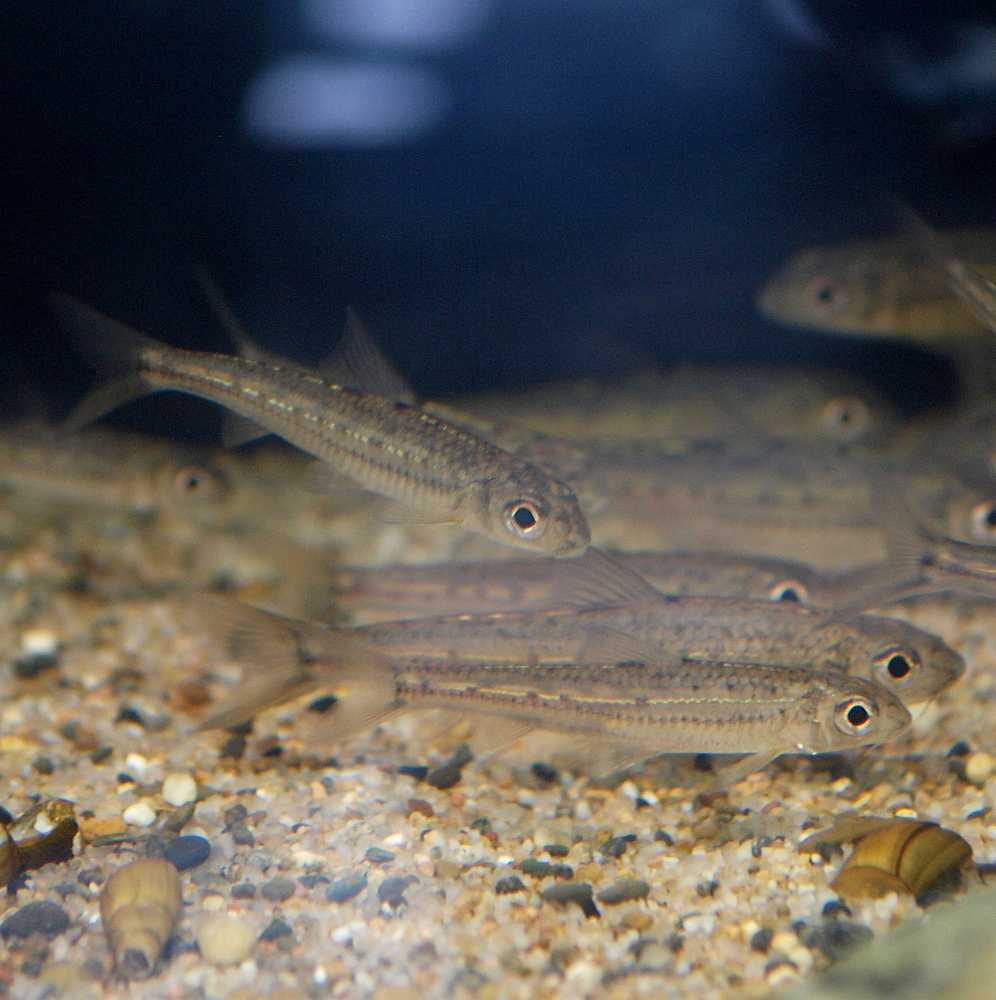
- Squalidus japonicus japonicus

Scientific classification
- Kingdom: Animalia
- Phylum: Chordata
- Class: Actinopterygii
- Division: Teleostei
- Order: Cypriniformes
- Family: Gobionidae
- Genus: Squalidus; Dybowski, 1872

Type species
- Squalidus chankaensis Dybowski, 1872

Synonyms
- Parasqualidus A. Doi, 2000; Sinigobio Chu, 1934

= Squalidus =

Genus of fishes

Squalidus is a genus of freshwater ray-finned fishes belonging to the family Gobionidae, the gudgeons. The fishes in this genus are found in Asia.

== Species ==
These are the currently recognized species in this genus:

- Squalidus argentatus (Sauvage & Dabry de Thiersant, 1874)
- Squalidus atromaculatus (Nichols & C. H. Pope, 1927)
- Squalidus banarescui I. S. Chen & Y. C. Chang, 2007
- Squalidus chankaensis Dybowski, 1872 (Khanka gudgeon)
- Squalidus gracilis (Temminck & Schlegel, 1846)
- Squalidus iijimae (Ōshima, 1919)
- Squalidus intermedius (Nichols, 1929)
- Squalidus japonicus (Sauvage, 1883)
- Squalidus maii (A. Doi, 2000)
- Squalidus mantschuricus (Mori, 1927)
- Squalidus minor (Harada, 1943)
- Squalidus multimaculatus K. Hosoya & S. R. Jeon, 1984
- Squalidus nitens (Günther, 1873)
- Squalidus vietnamensis Bănărescu & Nalbant, 1964
- Squalidus wolterstorffi (Regan, 1908)
