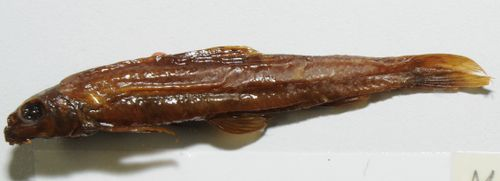
- (preserved specimen NRM-Fish:15573)

Conservation status
- Endangered (IUCN 3.1)

Scientific classification
- Kingdom: Animalia
- Phylum: Chordata
- Class: Actinopterygii
- Order: Cypriniformes
- Suborder: Cyprinoidei
- Family: Gobionidae
- Genus: Microphysogobio
- Species: M. koreensis

Binomial name
- Microphysogobio koreensis Mori, 1935

= Korean southern gudgeon =

Species of fish

The Korean southern gudgeon (Microphysogobio koreensis) is an endangered species of freshwater ray-finned fish belonging to the family Gobionidae, the gudgeons. This species is endemic to South Korea, where it is found in the Nakdong River and Seomjin River catchments, in the middle and upper reaches of the river where the current is fast and at bottoms that are gravelly and sandy. ts principal diet is algae.

It is an endangered species because of its rapid decrease due to river construction works and water pollution.

Its appearance is very like that of the Microphysogobio yaluensis, but it is slightly larger.
