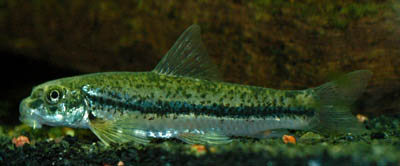
- Microphysogobio alticorpus

Scientific classification
- Kingdom: Animalia
- Phylum: Chordata
- Class: Actinopterygii
- Order: Cypriniformes
- Family: Gobionidae
- Genus: Microphysogobio; T. Mori, 1934

Type species
- Microphysogobio hsinglungshanensis Mori 1934

Synonyms
- Huigobio P.-W. Fang, 1938; Rostrogobio Taranetz, 1937

= Microphysogobio =

Genus of fishes

Microphysogobio is a genus of freshwater fish in the family Gobionidae, the gudgeons. The fishes in this genus are native to East Asia.

== Species ==
These are the currently recognized species in this genus:

- Microphysogobio alticorpus Bănărescu & Nalbant 1968 (Highbody longnose gudgeon)
- Microphysogobio amurensis (Taranetz 1937) (Amur longnose gudgeon)
- Microphysogobio anudarini Holčík & Pivnička, 1969
- Microphysogobio bicolor (Nichols, 1930)
- Microphysogobio brevirostris (Günther, 1868) (Shortnose gudgeon)
- Microphysogobio chenhsienensis (P.-W. Fang 1938)
- Microphysogobio chinssuensis (Nichols, 1926)
- Microphysogobio exilicauda (Z.-G. Jiang & E. Zhang, 2013)
- Microphysogobio fukiensis (Nichols, 1926)
- Microphysogobio heterocheilus (Z.-X. Sun, X.-J. Li, W.-Q. Tang & Y.-H. Zhao, 2021)
- Microphysogobio hsinglungshanensis Mori, 1934
- Microphysogobio jeoni I. S. Kim & H. Yang, 1999
- Microphysogobio kachekensis (Ōshima, 1926)
- Microphysogobio kiatingensis (H. W. Wu, 1930)
- Microphysogobio koreensis Mori, 1935 (Korean southern gudgeon)
- Microphysogobio liaohensis (K. J. Qin, 1987)
- Microphysogobio linghensis Y. H. Xie, 1986
- Microphysogobio longidorsalis Mori, 1935
- Microphysogobio luhensis S.-P. Huang, I.-S. Chen, Y.-H. Zhao & K.-T. Shao 2018.
- Microphysogobio microstomus P. Q. Yue, 1995
- Microphysogobio nudiventris Z. G. Jiang, E. H. Gao & E. Zhang, 2012
- Microphysogobio oujiangensis Z.-X. Sun & Y.-H. Zhao, 2022
- Microphysogobio pseudoelongatus Y. H. Zhao & C. G. Zhang, 2001
- Microphysogobio punctatus Z.-X. Sun, W.-Q. Tang & Y. H. Zhao, 2024
- Microphysogobio rapidus B. S. Chae & H. J. Yang, 1999
- Microphysogobio tafangensis (K. F. Wang, 1935)
- Microphysogobio tungtingensis (Nichols, 1926) (Long-nosed gudgeon)
- Microphysogobio vietnamica Đ. Y. Mai, 1978er.
- Microphysogobio wulonghensis Y. C. Xing, Y. H. Zhao, W. Q. Tang & C. G. Zhang, 2011
- Microphysogobio xianyouensis S.-P. Huang, I.-S. Chen & K.-T. Shao, 2016
- Microphysogobio yaluensis (Mori, 1928)
- Microphysogobio yunnanensis (Yao & Yang, 1977)
- Microphysogobio zhangi S.-P. Huang, Y.-H. Zhao, I.-S. Chen & K.-T. Shao, 2017
