= Maii =

Maii may refer to:

- Maii language
- Parasqualidus maii, a species of cyprinid fish
- Coyote (Navajo mythology) (Navajo: mąʼii), characters in Navajo mythology
- Jemez Pueblo, New Mexico (Navajo: Mąʼii Deeshgiizh), a census-designated place in Sandoval County, New Mexico, United States
