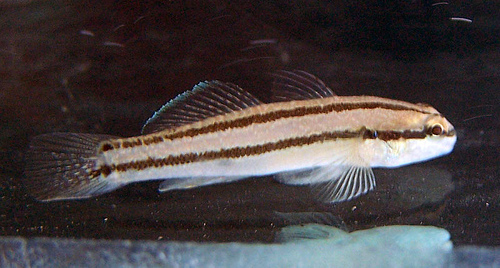

Conservation status
- Least Concern (IUCN 3.1)

Scientific classification
- Kingdom: Animalia
- Phylum: Chordata
- Class: Actinopterygii
- Order: Gobiiformes
- Family: Oxudercidae
- Genus: Tridentiger
- Species: T. trigonocephalus

Binomial name
- Tridentiger trigonocephalus (T. N. Gill, 1859)

Synonyms
- Triaenophorus trigonocephalus Gill, 1858

= Chameleon goby =

Species of fish

The chameleon goby (Tridentiger trigonocephalus) is a species of ray-finned fish native to marine and brackish waters along the coasts of eastern Asia. It has also spread to other parts of the world where it is found in waters with varying degrees of salinity.

== Description ==
The chameleon goby can reach 11 centimetres (4.3 in) total length. It is pale greyish-brown with a white-speckled head and two longitudinal black bands extending along the flank from the head to the caudal peduncle. The two dorsal fins may be speckled with white and have a brown longitudinal stripe, and the anal fin an orange or grey band across the centre. Under certain circumstances, this fish can darken in colour so that the black bands are nearly invisible. It is very similar in appearance to the Shimofuri goby (Tridentiger bifasciatus), but it has no white spots on the underside of its head and has a white margin to the second dorsal fin and the anal fins. T. bifasciatus has white spots on both the upper and lower part of the head and an orange-red margin to the second dorsal fin and the anal fins, but lacks the distinctive stripes that T. trigonocephalus has on these fins. T. bifasciatus prefers waters with a salinity of less than 22 parts per thousand, while T. trigonocephalus prefers higher salinities.

== Distribution and habitat ==
The chameleon goby is native to the eastern coast of Asia where its range includes Japan, Korea, China and Siberia. There have been reports that it has been found in the Black Sea, and recently in the eastern Mediterranean Sea from Ashdod harbour, Israel.

It is a demersal fish, living and feeding near the seabed, both in bays and rocky coasts, in brackish water and freshwater lakes. It typically hides in crevices, under stones, in burrows or among seagrasses.

== Biology ==
The chameleon goby is mainly nocturnal and feeds mostly on invertebrates such as polychaete worms which it extracts from the sediment. It also consumes crustaceans including skeleton shrimps and crab larvae. Breeding takes place at intervals throughout the spring and summer. The male prepares a nest in a crevice, a mollusc shell or even a discarded bottle or can. The eggs are guarded by the male and hatch after about ten days. The juveniles become mature within a year and their life expectancy is up to three years.

== Invasiveness ==
The chameleon goby was first detected in Los Angeles harbor in 1960 and was later found at other locations in California including Redwood City docks, the tidal lagoon of Lake Merritt in Oakland and San Diego Bay. It has also been reported from Australian waters. Possible means of introduction include being transported in a ship's ballast water, as a result of the commercial trade in Pacific oysters, or as eggs among the fouling organisms on the hull of a vessel. As an invasive species it is likely to compete with native species.
