= Squalidus mantschuricus =

Conservation status
- Least Concern (IUCN 3.1)

Scientific classification
- Kingdom: Animalia
- Phylum: Chordata
- Class: Actinopterygii
- Order: Cypriniformes
- Suborder: Cyprinoidei
- Family: Gobionidae
- Genus: Squalidus
- Species: S. mantschuricus

Binomial name
- Squalidus mantschuricus (Mori, 1927)

Synonyms
- Leucogobio mantschuricus Mori, 1927

Species of fish

Squalidus mantschuricus is a species of freshwater ray-finned fish belonging to the family Gobionidae, the gudgeons. This species is found in the Amur and Liao rivers in Asia.
