= Microphysogobio exilicauda =

Scientific classification
- Kingdom: Animalia
- Phylum: Chordata
- Class: Actinopterygii
- Order: Cypriniformes
- Suborder: Cyprinoidei
- Family: Gobionidae
- Genus: Microphysogobio
- Species: M. exilicauda

Binomial name
- Microphysogobio exilicauda Z.-G. Jiang & E. Zhang, 2013

Synonyms
- Huigobio exilicauda Z.-G. Jiang & E. Zhang, 2013

Species of fish

Microphysogobio exilicauda is a species of freshwater ray-finned fish belonging to the family Gobionidae, the gudgeons. This fish is found in the Pearl River basin in China. All of the specimens were collected in the Pearl River basin in Guangdong Province, China, in 1976. It is sometimes considered an ambiguous synonym of Microphysogobio chenhsienensis. Differs from M. chenhsienensis in that it has a thin (vs. stouter) caudal peduncle (depth 6.8–7.8 vs. 9.0–10.5 percent of SL; length 17.1–19.5 vs. 13.9–16.3 percent of SL); and a narrower (vs. greater) interorbital gap than eye.

The body is elongated, anteriorly subcylindrical, and posteriorly compressed, with the greatest body depth at the dorsal fin origin and the smallest caudal-peduncle depth directly anterior to the caudal-fin base. From the snout tip to the dorsal-fin origin, the dorsal body profile is slightly convex or straight; from there to the caudal-fin base, it is slightly concave. From the snout tip to the pectoral-fin insertion, the ventral profile is flat; from then to the anal-fin origin, it is convex, then slightly concave from the anal-fin origin to the caudal-fin base. Anus is located slightly closer to the insertion of the pelvic fin than to the origin of the anal fin. Slender and tightly compressed caudal peduncle.

The head is small, and the depth of the body is approximately equal to or shorter than the depth of the head. When viewed from the side, the snout is bluntly rounded, with a shallow transverse notch across the tip in front of the nostrils. Large, dorsolaterally positioned eye that is practically in the centre of the skull. Interorbital space is somewhat concave, narrow, and has a breadth that is smaller than the diameter of the eye. Nostrils are closer to the eye's anterior edge than to the tip of the snout. Maxillary barbels are rooted at the base of the external surface of the confluence of the upper and lower lips at the mouth's corner, and are shorter than half the diameter of the eye. The mouth is inferior and transverse, with a fissure at the corner of the mouth that bends somewhat backward.
