= Microphysogobio tafangensis =

Conservation status
- Least Concern (IUCN 3.1)

Scientific classification
- Kingdom: Animalia
- Phylum: Chordata
- Class: Actinopterygii
- Order: Cypriniformes
- Suborder: Cyprinoidei
- Family: Gobionidae
- Genus: Microphysogobio
- Species: M. tafangensis

Binomial name
- Microphysogobio tafangensis (K.-F. Wang, 1935)

Synonyms
- Pseudogobio tafangensis K.-F. Wang, 1935

Species of fish

Microphysogobio tafangensis is a species of freshwater ray-finned fish belonging to the family Gobionidae, the gudgeons. This fish is endemic to China.
