= Microphysogobio brevirostris =

Scientific classification
- Kingdom: Animalia
- Phylum: Chordata
- Class: Actinopterygii
- Order: Cypriniformes
- Suborder: Cyprinoidei
- Family: Gobionidae
- Genus: Microphysogobio
- Species: M. brevirostris

Binomial name
- Microphysogobio brevirostris (Günther, 1868)

Synonyms
- Pseudogobio brevirostris Günther, 1868

Species of fish

Microphysogobio brevirostris, the shortnose gudgeon, is a species of freshwater ray-finned fish belonging to the family Gobionidae, the gudgeons. This small demersal fish, the maximum published standard length is 9 cm (3.5 in), is endemic to Taiwan. It is found in the western part of the island where it occurs in well oxygentated, fast flowing parts of the lower and middle reaches of rivers, from the Houlong River to the Tamsui River. It forms schools and feeds on insects and benthic diatoms.
