= Squalidus minor =

Conservation status
- Endangered (IUCN 3.1)

Scientific classification
- Kingdom: Animalia
- Phylum: Chordata
- Class: Actinopterygii
- Order: Cypriniformes
- Suborder: Cyprinoidei
- Family: Gobionidae
- Genus: Squalidus
- Species: S. minor

Binomial name
- Squalidus minor (Harada, 1943)

Synonyms
- Leucogobio minor Harada, 1943

Species of fish

Squalidus minor is a species of freshwater ray-finned fish belonging to the family Gobionidae, the gudgeons. This species is endemic to Hainan in China.
