= Microphysogobio kiatingensis =

Conservation status
- Least Concern (IUCN 3.1)

Scientific classification
- Kingdom: Animalia
- Phylum: Chordata
- Class: Actinopterygii
- Order: Cypriniformes
- Suborder: Cyprinoidei
- Family: Gobionidae
- Genus: Microphysogobio
- Species: M. kiatingensis

Binomial name
- Microphysogobio kiatingensis (H.-W. Wu, 1930)

Synonyms
- Pseudogobio kiatingensis H.-W. Wu, 1930

Species of fish

Microphysogobio kiatingensis is a species of freshwater ray-finned fish belonging to the family Gobionidae, the gudgeons. This species is endemic to China.
