= Sarcocheilichthys caobangensis =

Scientific classification
- Kingdom: Animalia
- Phylum: Chordata
- Class: Actinopterygii
- Order: Cypriniformes
- Suborder: Cyprinoidei
- Family: Gobionidae
- Genus: Sarcocheilichthys
- Species: S. caobangensis

Binomial name
- Sarcocheilichthys caobangensis V. H. Nguyễn & V. B. Vo, 2001

Species of fish

Sarcocheilichthys caobangensis is a species of freshwater ray-finned fish belonging to the family Gobionidae. the gudgeons. This fish is endemic to Vietnam.
