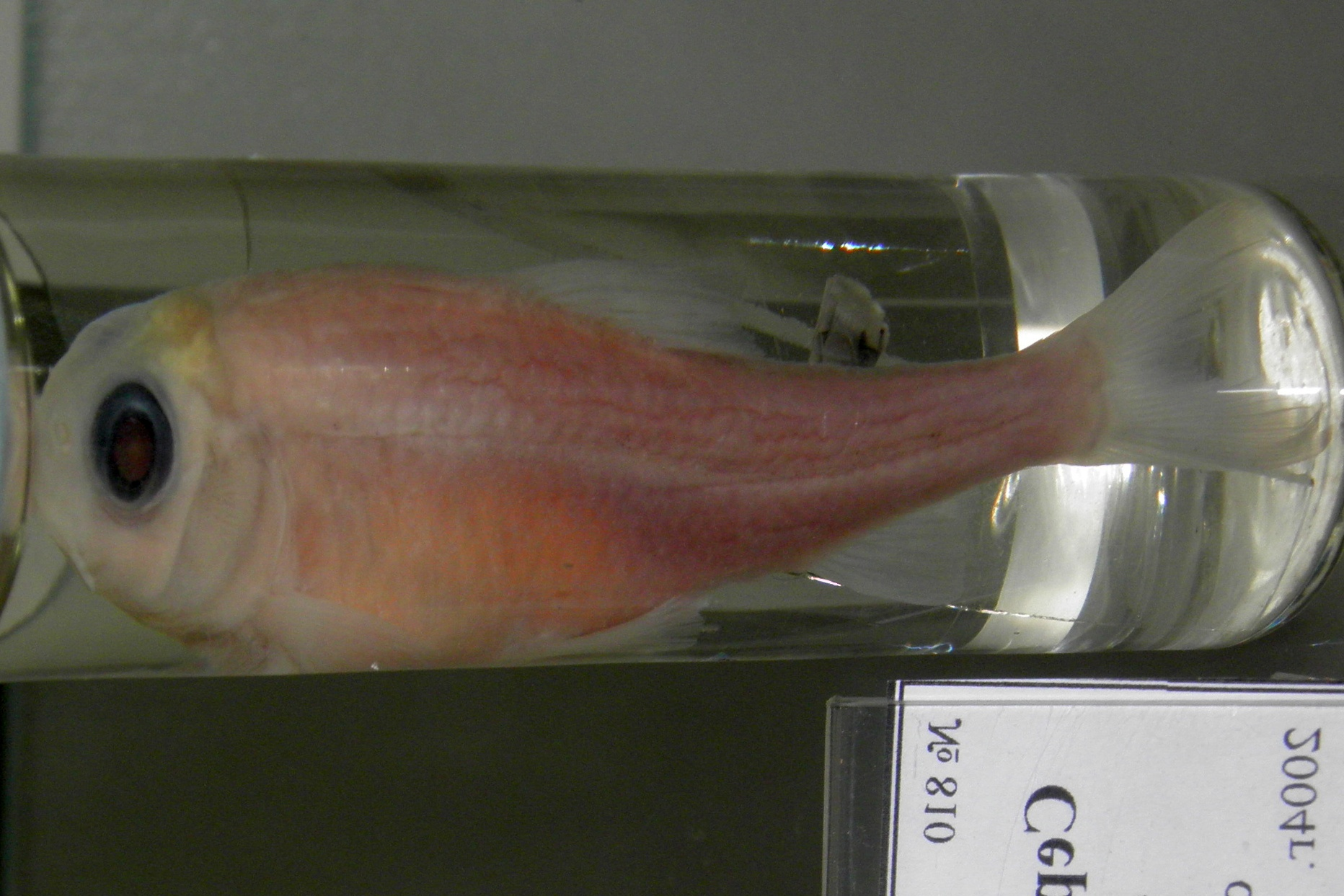

Conservation status
- Data Deficient (IUCN 3.1)

Scientific classification
- Kingdom: Animalia
- Phylum: Chordata
- Class: Actinopterygii
- Order: Cypriniformes
- Suborder: Cyprinoidei
- Family: Gobionidae
- Genus: Squalidus
- Species: S. argentatus

Binomial name
- Squalidus argentatus (Sauvage & Dabry de Thiersant, 1874)

Synonyms
- Gobio argentatus Sauvage & Dabry de Thiersant, 1874; Gnathopogon argentatus (Sauvage & Dabry de Thiersant 1874); Gobio (Leucogobio) hsui H.-W. Wu & K.-F. Wang, 1931

= Squalidus argentatus =

Species of fish

Squalidus argentatus is a species of freshwater ray-finned fish belonging to the family Gobionidae, the gudgeons. This species is endemic to China, Russia, and Taiwan.
