= Squalidus iijimae =

Scientific classification
- Kingdom: Animalia
- Phylum: Chordata
- Class: Actinopterygii
- Order: Cypriniformes
- Suborder: Cyprinoidei
- Family: Gobionidae
- Genus: Squalidus
- Species: S. iijimae

Binomial name
- Squalidus iijimae (Ōshima, 1919)

Synonyms
- Gnathopogon iijimae Ōshima, 1919

Species of fish

Squalidus iijimae is a species of freshwater ray-finned fish belonging to the family Gobionidae, the gudgeons. This species is endemic to Taiwan.

It is named in honor of zoologist Isao lijima (also spelled Ijima, 1861-1921), Science College, Imperial University of Tokyo.
