= Squalidus nitens =

Scientific classification
- Kingdom: Animalia
- Phylum: Chordata
- Class: Actinopterygii
- Order: Cypriniformes
- Suborder: Cyprinoidei
- Family: Gobionidae
- Genus: Squalidus
- Species: S. nitens

Binomial name
- Squalidus nitens (Günther, 1873)

Synonyms
- Gobio nitens Günther, 1873; Gobio sihuensis Y.-T. Chu, 1932; Gnathopogon sihuensis (Y.-T. Chu 1932); Abbottina guentheri Bănărescu & Nalbant, 1973

Species of fish

Squalidus nitens is a species of freshwater ray-finned fish belonging to the family Gobionidae, the gudgeons. This species is endemic to the Yangtze in China.
