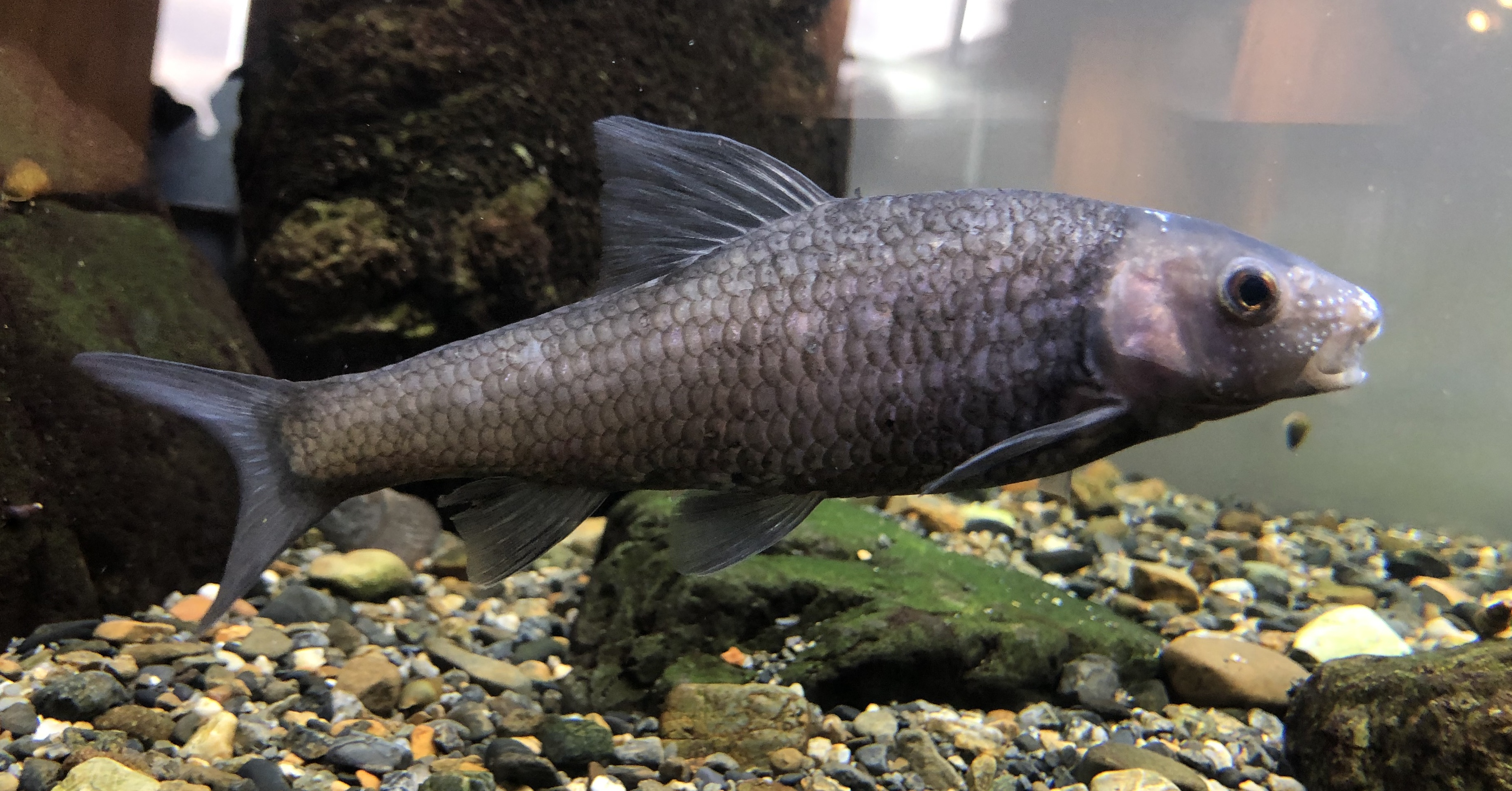

Conservation status
- Endangered (IUCN 3.1)

Scientific classification
- Kingdom: Animalia
- Phylum: Chordata
- Class: Actinopterygii
- Order: Cypriniformes
- Suborder: Cyprinoidei
- Family: Gobionidae
- Genus: Sarcocheilichthys
- Species: S. biwaensis

Binomial name
- Sarcocheilichthys biwaensis Hosoya, 1982

= Sarcocheilichthys biwaensis =

Species of fish

Sarcocheilichthys biwaensis is a species of freshwater ray-finned fish belonging to the family Gobionidae. the gudgeons. This fish is endemic to Lake Biwa in Japan.
