= Microphysogobio vietnamica =

Conservation status
- Data Deficient (IUCN 3.1)

Scientific classification
- Kingdom: Animalia
- Phylum: Chordata
- Class: Actinopterygii
- Order: Cypriniformes
- Suborder: Cyprinoidei
- Family: Gobionidae
- Genus: Microphysogobio
- Species: M. vietnamica

Binomial name
- Microphysogobio vietnamica Đ. Y. Mai, 1978

Species of fish

Microphysogobio vietnamica is a species of freshwater ray-finned fish belonging to the family Gobionidae, the gudgeons. This fish is endemic to northern Vietnam.
