= Microphysogobio longidorsalis =

Scientific classification
- Kingdom: Animalia
- Phylum: Chordata
- Class: Actinopterygii
- Order: Cypriniformes
- Suborder: Cyprinoidei
- Family: Gobionidae
- Genus: Microphysogobio
- Species: M. longidorsalis

Binomial name
- Microphysogobio longidorsalis Mori, 1935

Species of fish

Microphysogobio longidorsalis is a species of freshwater ray-finned fish belonging to the family Gobionidae, geons. This fish is endemic to South Korea, where it is found in clear, clean, gravel-covered rapids in the middle and upper reaches of the Han River, Imjin River, Geumgang River, and the Daedong Rivers. It feeds mainly on algae, and spawns from April to June.

It was first described in 1935 by Tamezo Mori.
