= Sarcocheilichthys hainanensis =

Conservation status
- Data Deficient (IUCN 3.1)

Scientific classification
- Kingdom: Animalia
- Phylum: Chordata
- Class: Actinopterygii
- Order: Cypriniformes
- Suborder: Cyprinoidei
- Family: Gobionidae
- Genus: Sarcocheilichthys
- Species: S. hainanensis

Binomial name
- Sarcocheilichthys hainanensis Nichols & Pope, 1927

Species of fish

Sarcocheilichthys hainanensis is a species of freshwater ray-finned fish belonging to the family Gobionidae, the gudgeons. This species is found in China, Laos, and Vietnam.
