= Microphysogobio kachekensis =

Conservation status
- Least Concern (IUCN 3.1)

Scientific classification
- Kingdom: Animalia
- Phylum: Chordata
- Class: Actinopterygii
- Order: Cypriniformes
- Suborder: Cyprinoidei
- Family: Gobionidae
- Genus: Microphysogobio
- Species: M. kachekensis

Binomial name
- Microphysogobio kachekensis (Ōshima, 1926)

Synonyms
- Pseudogobio kachekensis Ōshima, 1926; Pseudogobio labeoides Nichols & Pope, 1927; Microphysogobio labeoides (Nichols & Pope, 1927)

Species of fish

Microphysogobio kachekensis is a species of freshwater ray-finned fish belonging to the family Gobionidae, the gudgeons. This fish is found in China and Vietnam.
