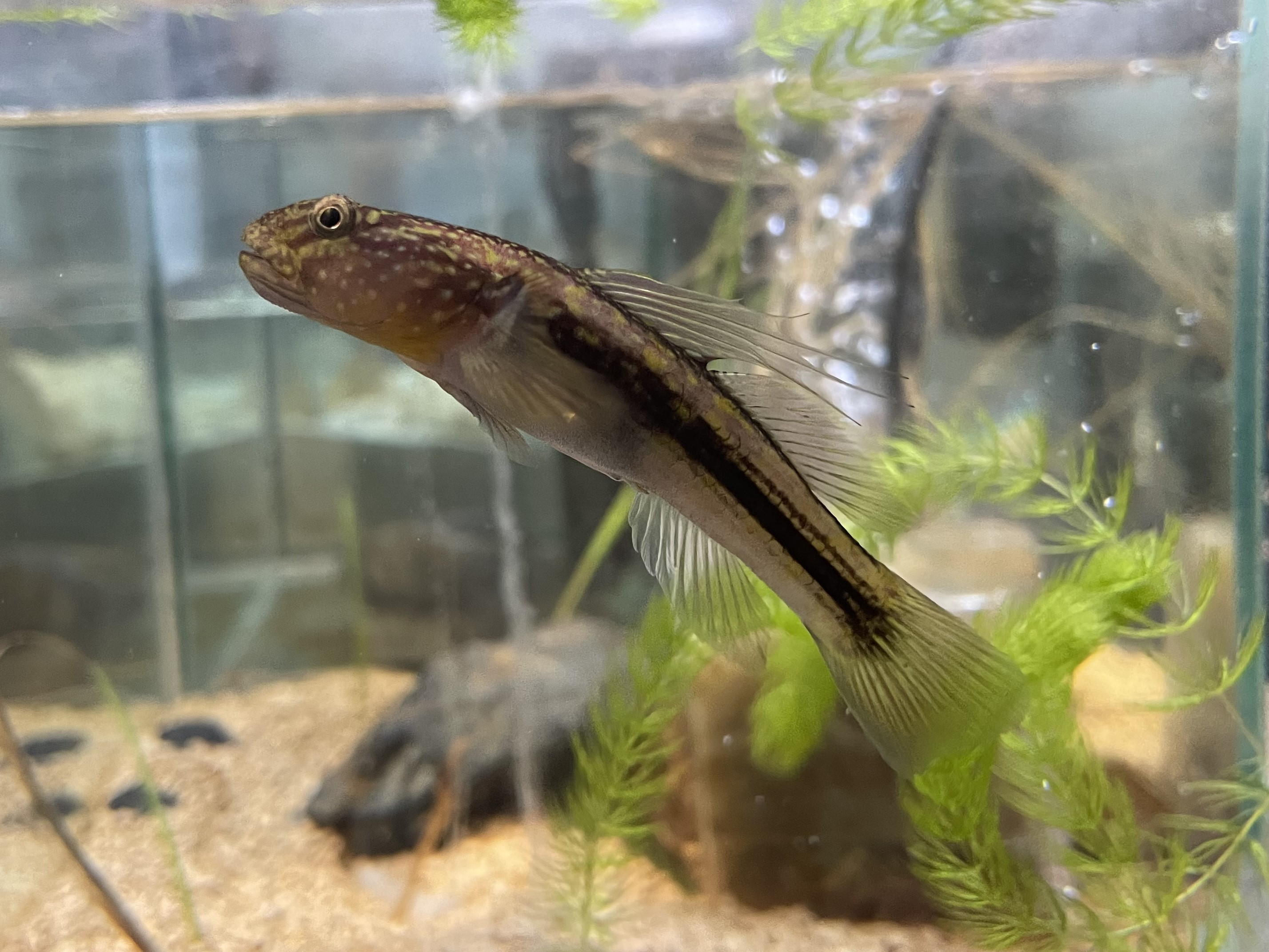

Conservation status
- Least Concern (IUCN 3.1)

Scientific classification
- Kingdom: Animalia
- Phylum: Chordata
- Class: Actinopterygii
- Order: Gobiiformes
- Family: Oxudercidae
- Genus: Tridentiger
- Species: T. kuroiwae

Binomial name
- Tridentiger kuroiwae D. S. Jordan & S. Tanaka (I), 1927

= Tridentiger kuroiwae =

Species of fish

Tridentiger kuroiwae is a species of goby endemic to Japan where it is found in flowing fresh waters.
