= Amur longnose gudgeon =

Conservation status
- Least Concern (IUCN 3.1)

Scientific classification
- Kingdom: Animalia
- Phylum: Chordata
- Class: Actinopterygii
- Order: Cypriniformes
- Suborder: Cyprinoidei
- Family: Gobionidae
- Genus: Microphysogobio
- Species: M. amurensis

Binomial name
- Microphysogobio amurensis (Taranetz, 1937)

Synonyms
- Rostrogobio amurensis Taranetz, 1937; Saurogobio amurensis (Taranetz 1937); Microphysogobio tungtingensis amurensis (Taranetz, 1937)

Species of fish

The Amur longnose gudgeon (Microphysogobio amurensis) is a species of freshwater ray-finned fish belonging to the family Gobionidae, the gudgeons. This species is endemic to the middle and lower Amur River and Lake Khanka.
