= Microphysogobio microstomus =

Scientific classification
- Kingdom: Animalia
- Phylum: Chordata
- Class: Actinopterygii
- Order: Cypriniformes
- Suborder: Cyprinoidei
- Family: Gobionidae
- Genus: Microphysogobio
- Species: M. microstomus

Binomial name
- Microphysogobio microstomus Xie, 1995

Species of fish

Microphysogobio microstomus is a species of freshwater ray-finned fish belonging to the family Gobionidae, the gudgeons. found in the lower reaches of the Yangtze in China.
