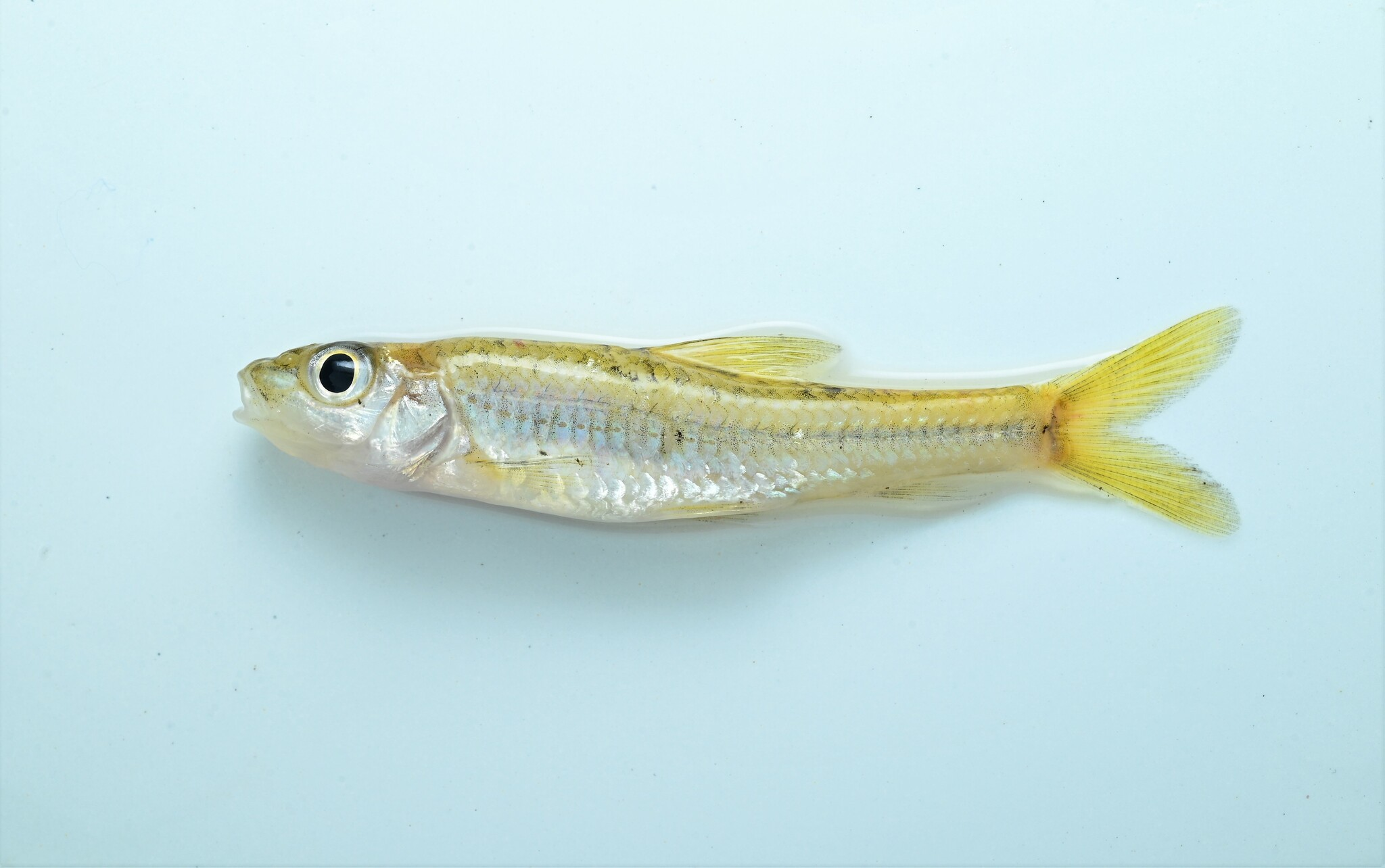

Conservation status
- Least Concern (IUCN 3.1)

Scientific classification
- Kingdom: Animalia
- Phylum: Chordata
- Class: Actinopterygii
- Order: Cypriniformes
- Suborder: Cyprinoidei
- Family: Gobionidae
- Genus: Squalidus
- Species: S. wolterstorffi

Binomial name
- Squalidus wolterstorffi (Regan, 1908)

Synonyms
- Gobio wolterstorffi Regan, 1908

= Squalidus wolterstorffi =

Species of fish

Squalidus wolterstorffi is a species of freshwater ray-finned fish belonging to the family Gobionidae, the gudgeons. This species is endemic to southeastern China.

Named in honor of German geologist, herpetologist and curator Willy Wolterstorff who "received" fishes from China collected by Martin Kreyenberg, including type specimen of this species.
