= Microphysogobio fukiensis =

Conservation status
- Least Concern (IUCN 3.1)

Scientific classification
- Kingdom: Animalia
- Phylum: Chordata
- Class: Actinopterygii
- Order: Cypriniformes
- Suborder: Cyprinoidei
- Family: Gobionidae
- Genus: Microphysogobio
- Species: M. fukiensis

Binomial name
- Microphysogobio fukiensis (Nichols, 1926)

Synonyms
- Pseudogobio fukiensis Nichols, 1926

Species of fish

Microphysogobio fukiensis is a species of freshwater ray-finned fish belonging to the family Gobionidae, the gudgeons. This species is endemic to China, where it is widespread in the lower reaches of some rivers.
