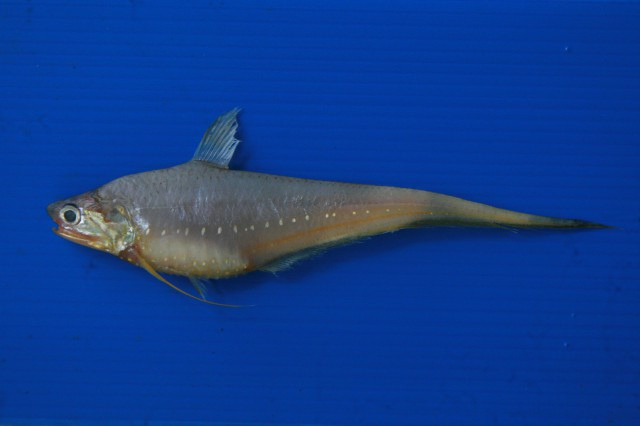
- Coilia dussumieri

Scientific classification
- Kingdom: Animalia
- Phylum: Chordata
- Class: Actinopterygii
- Order: Clupeiformes
- Family: Engraulidae
- Genus: Coilia
- Species: C. dussumieri

Binomial name
- Coilia dussumieri (Valenciennes, 1848)

= Coilia dussumieri =

Goldspotted grenadier anchovy

Species of ray-finned fish

Coilia dussumieri, the goldspotted grenadier anchovy, is a species of ray-finned fish in the family Engraulidae. It is found in coastal waters and estuaries in the tropical western Indo-Pacific region.

== Biology ==
C. dussimieri is a coastal and estuary fish species. They are saline water fish but are also able to tolerate lowered salinity. They feed on copepods, prawn and fish larvae, various unidentified crustaceans and cypris, and other invertebrates. It is likely that they migrate into estuaries for breeding purposes.

== Distribution ==
This species is mainly found in coastal waters around India, Bangladesh, and Myanmar. It can also be found in areas from Thailand south to the Malay Peninsula and Java.
