= Microphysogobio chinssuensis =

Conservation status
- Least Concern (IUCN 3.1)

Scientific classification
- Kingdom: Animalia
- Phylum: Chordata
- Class: Actinopterygii
- Order: Cypriniformes
- Suborder: Cyprinoidei
- Family: Gobionidae
- Genus: Microphysogobio
- Species: M. chinssuensis

Binomial name
- Microphysogobio chinssuensis (Nichols, 1926)

Synonyms
- Pseudogobio chinssuensis Nichols, 1926; Huigobio chinssuensis (Nichols, 1926)

Species of fish

Microphysogobio chinssuensis is a species of freshwater ray-finned fish belonging to the family Gobionidae, the gudgeons. This species is endemic to the upper reaches of the Yangtze River.
