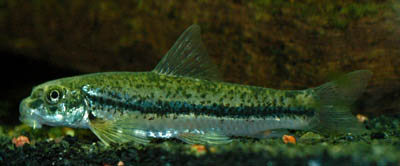

Scientific classification
- Kingdom: Animalia
- Phylum: Chordata
- Class: Actinopterygii
- Order: Cypriniformes
- Suborder: Cyprinoidei
- Family: Gobionidae
- Genus: Microphysogobio
- Species: M. alticorpus

Binomial name
- Microphysogobio alticorpus Bănărescu & Nalbant, 1968

Synonyms
- Microphysogobio brevirostris alticorpus Bănărescu & Nalbant, 1968

= Microphysogobio alticorpus =

Species of fish

Microphysogobio alticorpus, the highbody longnose gudgeon, is a species of freshwater ray-finned fish belonging to the family Gobionidae, the gudgeons. This small demersal fish, the maximum published standard length is 6.3 cm (2.5 in), is endemic to Taiwan. It is found in the western part of the island where it occurs in well oxygentated, fast flowing parts of the lower and middle reaches of rivers, from the Taan River to Kaoping River. It forms schools and feeds on insects and benthic diatoms.
