= Thicklip gudgeon =

Conservation status
- Least Concern (IUCN 3.1)

- Least Concern (IUCN 3.1)

Scientific classification
- Kingdom: Animalia
- Phylum: Chordata
- Class: Actinopterygii
- Order: Cypriniformes
- Suborder: Cyprinoidei
- Family: Gobionidae
- Genus: Sarcocheilichthys
- Species: S. sciistius

Binomial name
- Sarcocheilichthys sciistius (Abbott, 1901)

Synonyms
- Leuciscus sciistius Abbott, 1901; Chilogobio czerskii Berg, 1914; Sarcocheilichthys czerskii (Berg 1914); Chilogobio soldatovi Berg, 1914; Sarcocheilichthys soldatovi (Berg 1914)

Species of fish

The thicklip gudgeon (Sarcocheilichthys sciistius) is a species of freshwater ray-finned fish belonging to the family Gobionidae, the gudgeons. This species is found in Eastern Asia.

== Taxonomy ==
The thicklip gudgeon was first formally described as Leuciscus sciistius in 1901 by the American zoologist James Francis Abbott with its type locality given as the Pei-ho River, Tien-Tsin, China. In 1914 the Russian scientist Lev Berg described two species, Chilogobio czerskii and C. soldatovi, respectively known as Czerski's thicklip gudgeon and Soldatov's thicklip gudgeon, but these are now considered to be synonyms of Abbott's L. sciistus. This species is classified in the genus Sarcocheilichthys which is an eastern Asian genus of the family Gobionidae, the freshwater gudgeons.

== Etymology ==
The thicklip gudgeon is classified in the genus Sarcocheilichthys, this name is a combination of Greek terms sarco-, from sárx, which means "flesh", and, cheī́los, meaning "lip", an allusion to the fleshy lips of the typw species of the genus S. variegatus suffixed with ichthýs which means "fish". The specific name, sciistius, is a compound of skiā́, which means "shade" or "shadow", with istius which derives from histion meaning sail. This is an allusion to the dark dorsal fin.

== Distribution and habitat ==
The thicklip gudgeon occurs in the drainage systems of the Amur, Huaihe River, Yellow River and Haihe River in China, Mongolia, Russia and Korea. These fishes are found in lakes, main river streams and tributaries.

== Biology ==
The thicklip gudgeon becomes sexually mature at three years old when they have a length in excess of 6 cm (2.4 in). The large, yellowish pink eggs are laid using a short ovipositor either between stones or in the mantle cavity of bivalves. This species and related species are described as facultative ostracophilic, i.e. they may lay eggs inside bivalves. It feeds on benthic invertebrates such as polychaetes, insect larvae and crustaceans.
