= Squalidus atromaculatus =

Conservation status
- Least Concern (IUCN 3.1)

Scientific classification
- Kingdom: Animalia
- Phylum: Chordata
- Class: Actinopterygii
- Order: Cypriniformes
- Suborder: Cyprinoidei
- Family: Gobionidae
- Genus: Squalidus
- Species: S. atromaculatus

Binomial name
- Squalidus atromaculatus (Nichols & Pope, 1927)

Synonyms
- Gnathopogon atromaculatus Nichols & Pope, 1927; Squalidus chankaensis vietnamensis Bănărescu & Nalbant, 1964

Species of fish

Squalidus atromaculatus is a species of freshwater ray-finned fish belonging to the family Gobionidae, the gudgeons. This species is endemic to China, Laos, and Vietnam.
