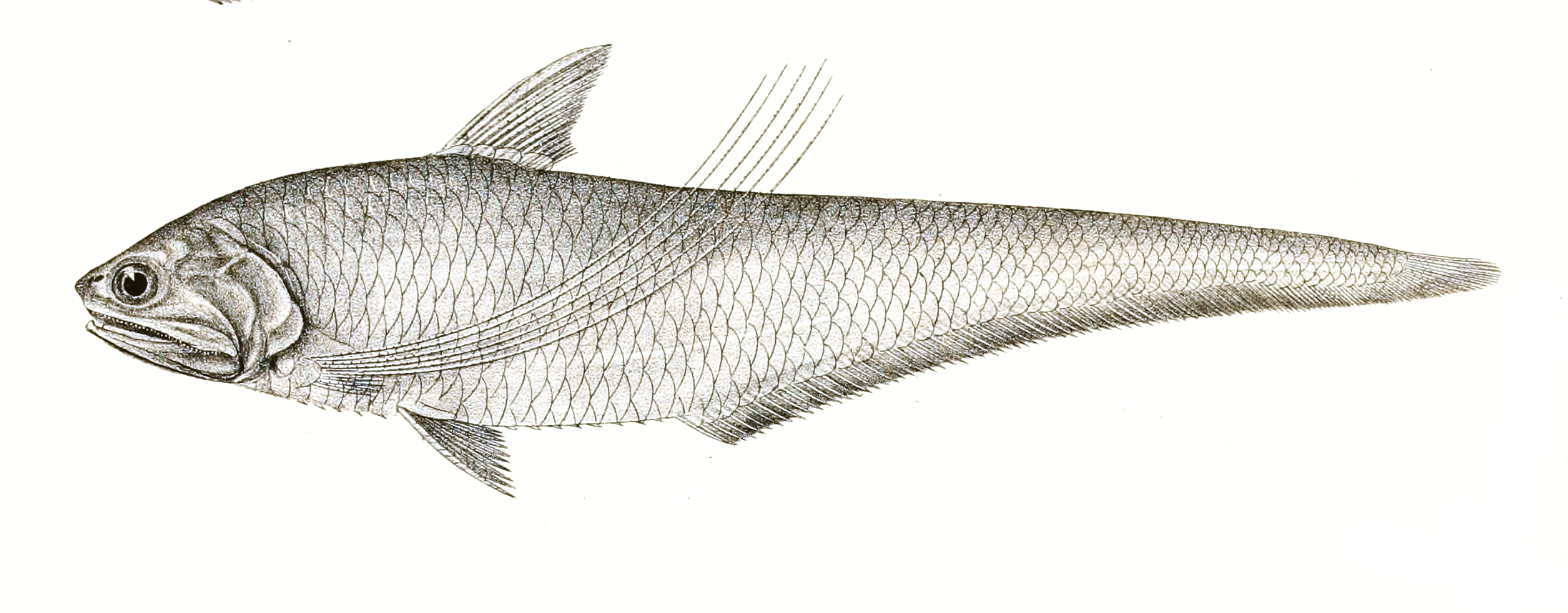

Conservation status
- Data Deficient (IUCN 3.1)

Scientific classification
- Kingdom: Animalia
- Phylum: Chordata
- Class: Actinopterygii
- Order: Clupeiformes
- Family: Engraulidae
- Genus: Coilia
- Species: C. ramcarati

Binomial name
- Coilia ramcarati (Hamilton, 1822)

Synonyms
- Mystus ramcarati Hamilton, 1822; Engraulis hamiltonii Gray, 1830; Coilia quadragesimalis Valenciennes, 1848; Coilia cantoris Bleeker, 1853

= Ramcarat grenadier anchovy =

Species of fish

The ramcarat grenadier anchovy (Coilia ramcarati) is a species of marine ray-finned fish belonging to the family Engraulidae, the anchovies. This species is found in the northern Indian Ocean.

== Taxonomy ==
The ramcarat grenadier anchovy was first formally described as Mystus ramcarati in 1822 by the Scottish naturalist Francis Buchanan-Hamilton with its type locality given as the Botanical Garden of Calcutta, Ganges River estuary, India. In 1830 John Edward Gray described a new anchovy species which he called Engraulis hamitloni which he classified in a new monotypic subgenus he called Coilia, which he classified as a genus in 1831. This species, as Engraulis hamiltonii, is the type species of Coilia. Coilia is classified within the subfamily Coiliinae in the anchovy family Engraulidae within the order Clupeiformes, which also includes the herrings, sardines and shads.

== Etymology ==
The ramcarat grenadier anchovy is the type species of the genus Coilia, the derivation of this name was not explained by Gray but it is either from a local name for this fish, or, it is derived from the Greek koilia, which means "belly" or "abdomen", and this may refer to the serrated abodomen of this species. The specific name ramcarati is a latinisation of ramcarata, thought to be a local name for this species along the Ganges.

== Description ==
The ramcarat grenadier anchovy has a tapered body which has a rounded belly in front of its pelvic fins. There are 15 or 16 keeled scutes in a line running from immediately behind the base of the pectoral fins to the anus. It has a short maxilla, which does not extend as far as the gill cover. There are 6 long filaments extending out from the pectoral fins, the branched rays of the pectoral fins are shorter than those of the pelvic fins. This species has a maximum published total length of 25 cm (9.8 in).

== Distribution and habitat ==
The ramcarat grenadier anchovy is found in the northern Indian Ocean where it has been recorded from the Ganges Delta and the Andaman Sea south to Odisha in India and to the south of Yangon. Reports from the Godavari River need confirmation. This is a species of coastal waters, estuaries and tidal rivers.

== Biology ==
The ramcarat grenadier anchovy is found in schools, spawing in schools too. Spawning takes place in Bangladesh in March to May. This is a predatory species which has a diet consisting of crustaceans and fishes, as well as the fish, crustacean, and polychaete eggs.

== Fisheries ==
The ramcarat grenadier anchovy is an important target species for fisheries in India and Bangladesh and commands high prices in fish markets, as fresh or dried fish. It is thought to be overfished in Bangladesh.
