= Cottus hangiongensis =

Conservation status
- Least Concern (IUCN 3.1)

Scientific classification
- Kingdom: Animalia
- Phylum: Chordata
- Class: Actinopterygii
- Order: Perciformes
- Suborder: Cottoidei
- Family: Cottidae
- Genus: Cottus
- Species: C. hangiongensis

Binomial name
- Cottus hangiongensis Mori, 1930

Species of fish

Cottus hangiongensis is a species of freshwater ray-finned fish belonging to the family Cottidae, the typical sculpins. It is found from Primorsky Krai in Russia to the Korean Peninsula. It reaches a maximum length of 15 cm (5.9 in). It prefers clear and cold water streams with sandy and gravelly bottoms.
