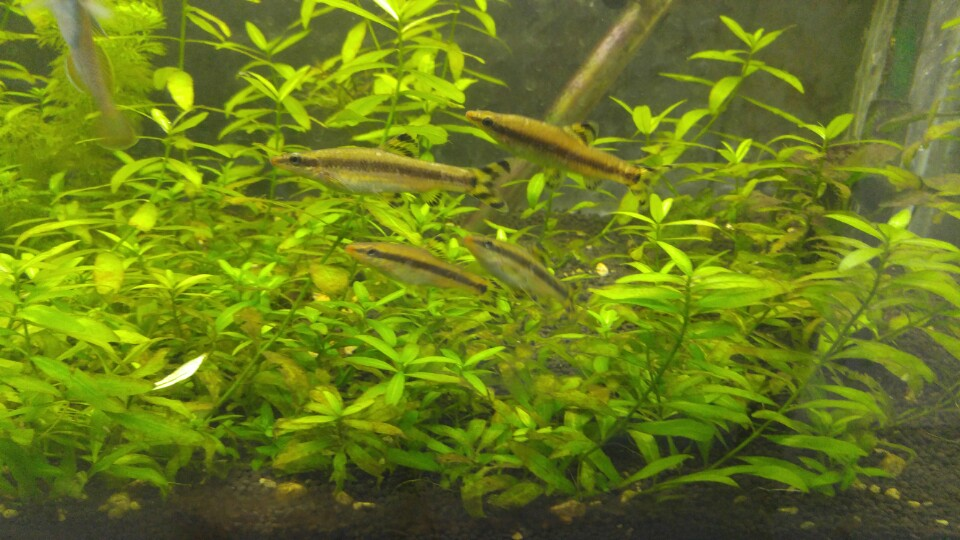

Conservation status
- Vulnerable (IUCN 3.1)

Scientific classification
- Kingdom: Animalia
- Phylum: Chordata
- Class: Actinopterygii
- Order: Cypriniformes
- Suborder: Cyprinoidei
- Family: Gobionidae
- Genus: Pseudopungtungia
- Species: P. nigra

Binomial name
- Pseudopungtungia nigra Mori, 1935

= Black shinner =

Species of fish

The black shinner (Pseudopungtungia nigra) is a species of freshwater ray-finned fish belonging to the family Gobionidae, the gudgeons. This species is endemic to South Korea where it is restricted to the Geum, Mangyeong and Ungcheon rivers. It is the type species of the genus Pseudopungtungia. The black shiner is typically found in small shoals of at least 10 fishes in clear, flowing upper and middle stretches where the stream bed consists of rock, boulders, gravel or sand. They normally spawn beneath rocks or in gravel in the spring and early summer. They are known to be brood parasites within the nests of Coreoperca herzi.
