= Microphysogobio nudiventris =

Scientific classification
- Kingdom: Animalia
- Phylum: Chordata
- Class: Actinopterygii
- Order: Cypriniformes
- Suborder: Cyprinoidei
- Family: Gobionidae
- Genus: Microphysogobio
- Species: M. nudiventris

Binomial name
- Microphysogobio nudiventris Z. G. Jiang, E. H. Gao & E. Zhang, 2012

Species of fish

Microphysogobio nudiventris is a species of freshwater ray-finned fish belonging to the family Gobionidae, the gudgeons. This fish is found in the Du-He River in China.
