= Squalidus banarescui =

Scientific classification
- Kingdom: Animalia
- Phylum: Chordata
- Class: Actinopterygii
- Order: Cypriniformes
- Suborder: Cyprinoidei
- Family: Gobionidae
- Genus: Squalidus
- Species: S. banarescui

Binomial name
- Squalidus banarescui I. S. Chen & Y. C. Chang, 2007

Species of fish

Squalidus banarescui is a species of freshwater ray-finned fish belonging to the family Gobionidae, the gudgeons. This fish is endemic to the Dadu River in Taiwan.

Named in honor of Petru Bănărescu, Institute of Biology, Bucharest, for his "great" contributions to Taiwanese cyprinid taxonomy, especially the subfamily Gobioninae, between 1960 and 1973.
