= Squalidus intermedius =

Conservation status
- Data Deficient (IUCN 3.1)

Scientific classification
- Kingdom: Animalia
- Phylum: Chordata
- Class: Actinopterygii
- Order: Cypriniformes
- Suborder: Cyprinoidei
- Family: Gobionidae
- Genus: Squalidus
- Species: S. intermedius

Binomial name
- Squalidus intermedius (Nichols, 1929)

Synonyms
- Gnathopogon intermedius Nichols; Gnathopogon similis Nichols, 1929

Species of fish

Squalidus intermedius is a species of freshwater ray-finned fish belonging to the family Gobionidae, the gudgeons. This species is endemic to the Yellow River in China.
