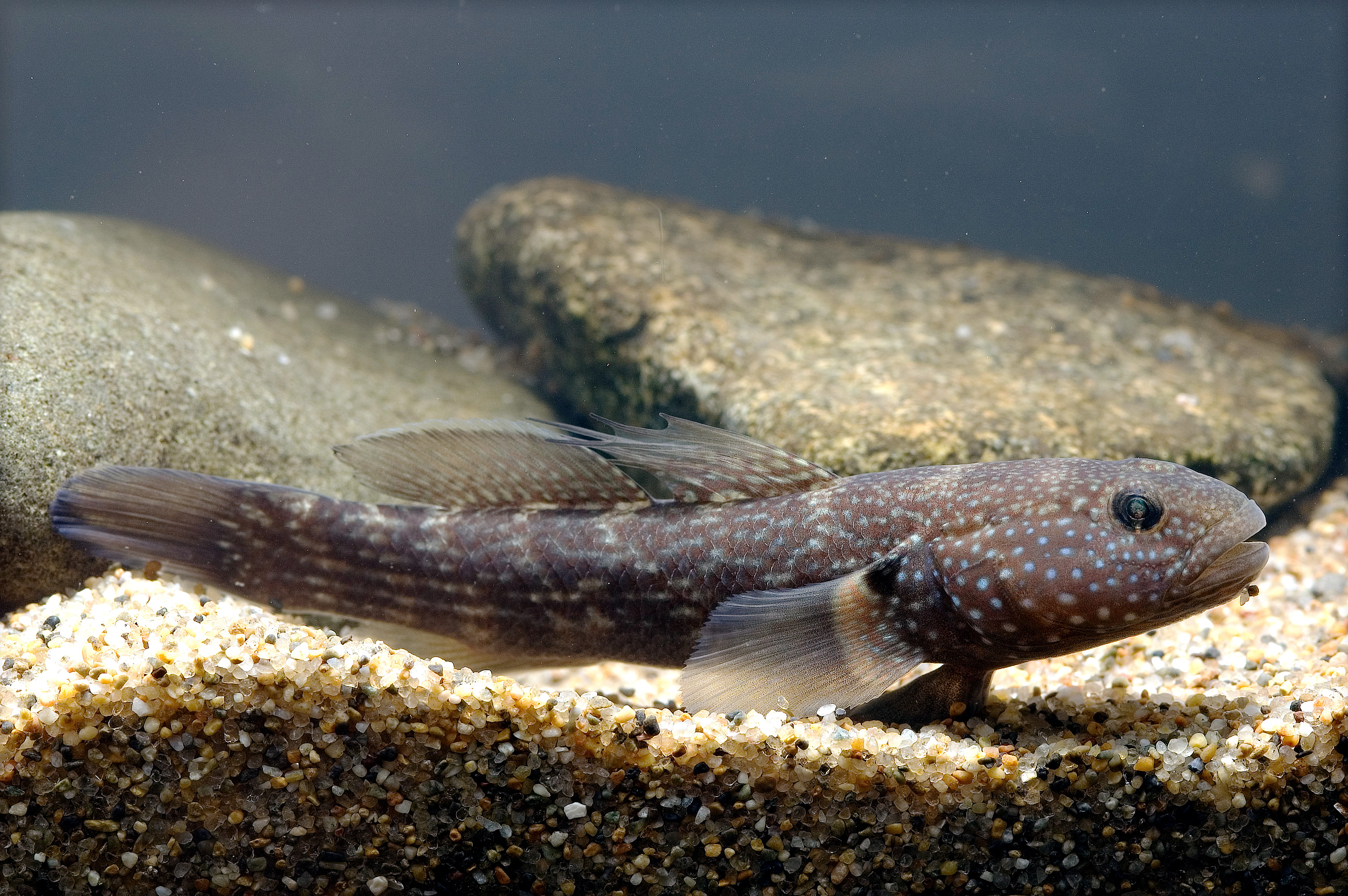
- Tridentiger brevispinis

Scientific classification
- Kingdom: Animalia
- Phylum: Chordata
- Class: Actinopterygii
- Division: Teleostei
- Order: Gobiiformes
- Family: Oxudercidae
- Subfamily: Gobionellinae
- Genus: Tridentiger; T. N. Gill, 1859

Type species
- Sicydium obscurum Temminck & Schlegel, 1845

Synonyms
- Triaenophorichthys Gill, 1859; Triaenophorus Gill, 1859; Triaenopogon Bleeker, 1874; Trifissus Jordan & Snyder, 1900; Trigonocephalus Okada, 1961

= Tripletooth goby =

Genus of fishes

Tridentiger is a genus of fish in the subfamily of gobies called the Gobionellinae, known commonly as the tripletooth gobies.

These fish are native to the coastal waters of China, Japan, and Korea, where they live in brackish habitat types. They are often dominant members of the local fish fauna. Some are known as invasive species in North America.

These gobies are generally under 10 centimetres (3.9 in) long.

== Species ==
There are currently 6 recognized species in this genus:

- Tridentiger bifasciatus Steindachner, 1881 (Shimofuri goby)
- Tridentiger brevispinis Katsuyama, R. Arai & M. Nakamura, 1972
- Tridentiger kuroiwae D. S. Jordan & S. Tanaka (I), 1927
- Tridentiger niger Fang, 1942
- Tridentiger obscurus Temminck & Schlegel, 1845 (Dusky tripletooth goby)
- Tridentiger trigonocephalus T. N. Gill, 1859 (Chameleon goby)
