= Sarcocheilichthys davidi =

Scientific classification
- Kingdom: Animalia
- Phylum: Chordata
- Class: Actinopterygii
- Order: Cypriniformes
- Suborder: Cyprinoidei
- Family: Gobionidae
- Genus: Sarcocheilichthys
- Species: S. davidi

Binomial name
- Sarcocheilichthys davidi (Sauvage, 1878)

Synonyms
- Tylognathus davidi Sauvage, 1878; Sarcocheilichthys nigripinnis davidi (Sauvage, 1878)

Species of fish

Sarcocheilichthys davidi is a species of freshwater ray-finned fish belonging to the family Gobionidae. the gudgeons. This species is endemic to China.

It is named in honor of the Catholic missionary and zoologist Armand David (1826-1900), who collected the type specimen.
