= Microphysogobio liaohensis =

Scientific classification
- Kingdom: Animalia
- Phylum: Chordata
- Class: Actinopterygii
- Order: Cypriniformes
- Suborder: Cyprinoidei
- Family: Gobionidae
- Genus: Microphysogobio
- Species: M. liaohensis

Binomial name
- Microphysogobio liaohensis (K. J. Qin, 1987)

Synonyms
- Rostrogobio liaohensis Qin, 1987

Species of fish

Microphysogobio liaohensis is a species of freshwater ray-finned fish belonging to the family Gobionidae, the gudgeons. This species is found in the Liaohe River in China.
