= Microphysogobio pseudoelongatus =

Scientific classification
- Kingdom: Animalia
- Phylum: Chordata
- Class: Actinopterygii
- Order: Cypriniformes
- Suborder: Cyprinoidei
- Family: Gobionidae
- Genus: Microphysogobio
- Species: M. pseudoelongatus

Binomial name
- Microphysogobio pseudoelongatus Y.-H. Zhao & C. G. Zhang, 2001

Species of fish

Microphysogobio pseudoelongatus is a species of freshwater ray-finned fish belonging to the family Gobionidae, the gudgeons. This fish is found in Guangxi, China.
