= Sarcocheilichthys lacustris =

Conservation status
- Least Concern (IUCN 3.1)

Scientific classification
- Kingdom: Animalia
- Phylum: Chordata
- Class: Actinopterygii
- Order: Cypriniformes
- Suborder: Cyprinoidei
- Family: Gobionidae
- Genus: Sarcocheilichthys
- Species: S. lacustris

Binomial name
- Sarcocheilichthys lacustris (Dybowski, 1872)

Synonyms
- Barbodon lacustris Dybowski, 1872; Sarcocheilichthys sinensis lacustris (Dybowski, 1872)

Species of fish

Sarcocheilichthys lacustris is a species of freshwater ray-finned fish belonging to the family Gobionidae, the gudgeons. This fish is found in Asia.
