= Microphysogobio anudarini =

Conservation status
- Least Concern (IUCN 3.1)

Scientific classification
- Kingdom: Animalia
- Phylum: Chordata
- Class: Actinopterygii
- Order: Cypriniformes
- Suborder: Cyprinoidei
- Family: Gobionidae
- Genus: Microphysogobio
- Species: M. anudarini

Binomial name
- Microphysogobio anudarini Holčík & Pivnička, 1969

Synonyms
- Microphysogobio tungtingensis anudarini Holčík & Pivnicka, 1969

Species of fish

Microphysogobio anudarini is a species of freshwater ray-finned fish belonging to the family Gobionidae, the gudgeons. This fish is endemic to the upper Amur drainage in Mongolia and China.

Named in honor of the Mongolian ichthyologist Anudarin Dashidorzhi.
