= Microphysogobio wulonghensis =

Scientific classification
- Kingdom: Animalia
- Phylum: Chordata
- Class: Actinopterygii
- Order: Cypriniformes
- Suborder: Cyprinoidei
- Family: Gobionidae
- Genus: Microphysogobio
- Species: M. wulonghensis

Binomial name
- Microphysogobio wulonghensis Y. C. Xing, Y.-H. Zhao, W.-Q. Tang & C. G. Zhang, 2011

Species of fish

Microphysogobio wulonghensis is a species of freshwater ray-finned fish belonging to the family Gobionidae, the gudgeons. This fish is endemic to the Wulonghe River in Shandong Province, China.
