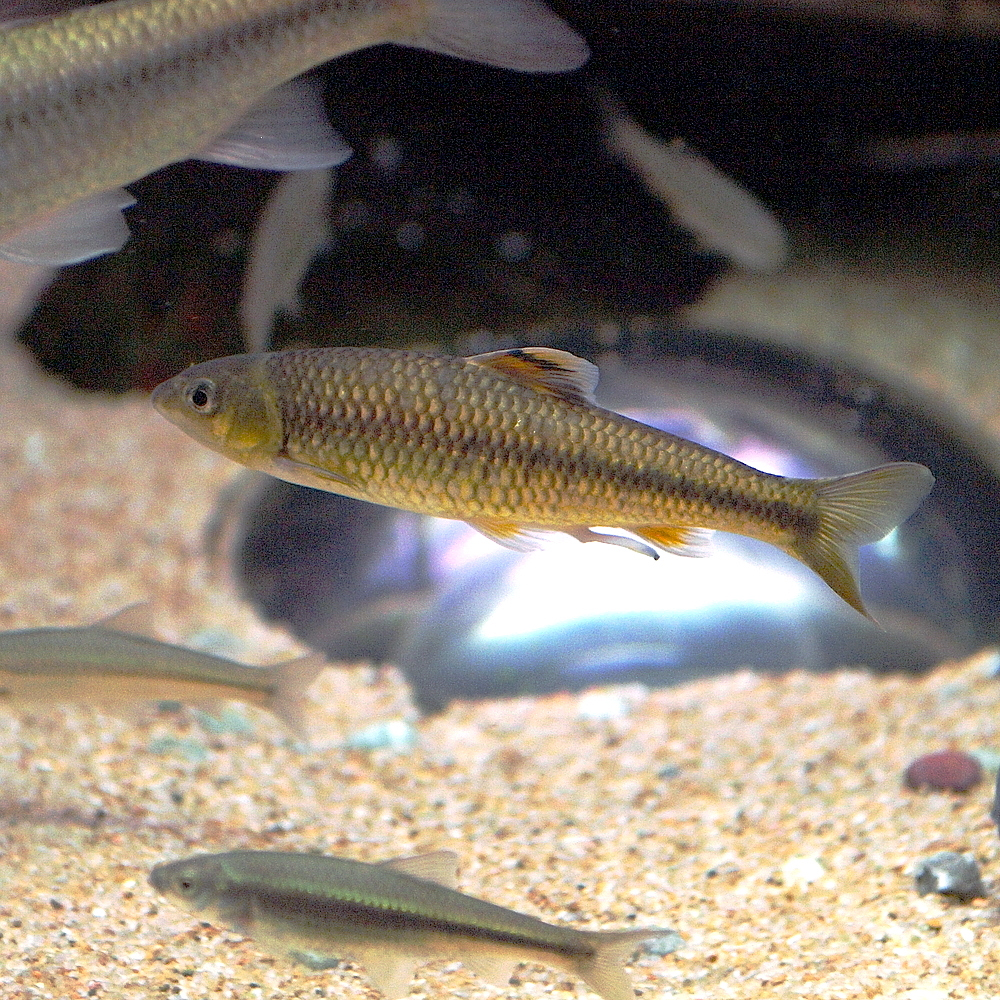
- Sarcocheilichthys variegatus microoculus

Scientific classification
- Kingdom: Animalia
- Phylum: Chordata
- Class: Actinopterygii
- Division: Teleostei
- Order: Cypriniformes
- Family: Gobionidae
- Genus: Sarcocheilichthys; Bleeker, 1860

Type species
- Leuciscus variegatus Temminck & Schlegel, 1846

Synonyms
- Barbodon Dybowski, 1872; Chilogobio Berg, 1914; Exoglossops Fowler, 1920; Georgichthys Nichols, 1918

= Sarcocheilichthys =

Genus of fishes

Sarcocheilichthys is a genus of freshwater ray-finned fishes belonging to the family Gobionidae, the gudgeons. The fishes in this genus are found in eastern Asia.

== Species ==
Sarcocheilichthys includes the following recognised species:

- Sarcocheilichthys biwaensis K. Hosoya, 1982
- Sarcocheilichthys caobangensis V. H. Nguyễn & V. B. Vo, 2001
- Sarcocheilichthys davidi (Sauvage, 1878)
- Sarcocheilichthys hainanensis Nichols & C. H. Pope, 1927
- Sarcocheilichthys hanjiangensis I.-S. Chen & H.-E. Li. 2024.
- Sarcocheilichthys kiangsiensis Nichols, 1930
- Sarcocheilichthys lacustris (Dybowski, 1872)
- Sarcocheilichthys nigripinnis (Günther, 1873) (Rainbow gudgeon)
- Sarcocheilichthys parvus Nichols, 1930
- Sarcocheilichthys sciistius (Abbott, 1901) (Thicklip gudgeon)
- Sarcocheilichthys sinensis Bleeker, 1871 (Chinese lake gudgeon)
- Sarcocheilichthys variegatus (Temminck & Schlegel, 1846)
- Sarcocheilichthys vittatus C.-T. An, E. Zhang & J.-Z. Shen, 2020
