= Microphysogobio yunnanensis =

Conservation status
- Data Deficient (IUCN 3.1)

Scientific classification
- Kingdom: Animalia
- Phylum: Chordata
- Class: Actinopterygii
- Order: Cypriniformes
- Suborder: Cyprinoidei
- Family: Gobionidae
- Genus: Microphysogobio
- Species: M. yunnanensis

Binomial name
- Microphysogobio yunnanensis (Yao & Yang, 1977)

Synonyms
- Abbottina yunnanensis Yao & Yang, 1977; Microphysogobio buas Đ. Y. Mai, 1978

Species of fish

Microphysogobio yunnanensis is a species of freshwater ray-finned fish belonging to the family Gobionidae, the gudgeons. This fish is found in the upper Mekong River basin in China and the Búa River in northern Vietnam.
