= Sarcocheilichthys parvus =

Conservation status
- Least Concern (IUCN 3.1)

Scientific classification
- Kingdom: Animalia
- Phylum: Chordata
- Class: Actinopterygii
- Order: Cypriniformes
- Suborder: Cyprinoidei
- Family: Gobionidae
- Genus: Sarcocheilichthys
- Species: S. parvus

Binomial name
- Sarcocheilichthys parvus Nichols, 1930

Species of fish

Sarcocheilichthys parvus is a species of freshwater ray-finned fish belonging to the family Gobionidae, the gudgeons. This species is found in China.
