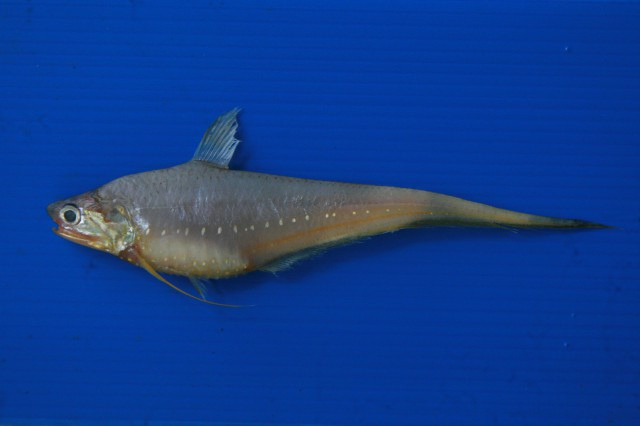

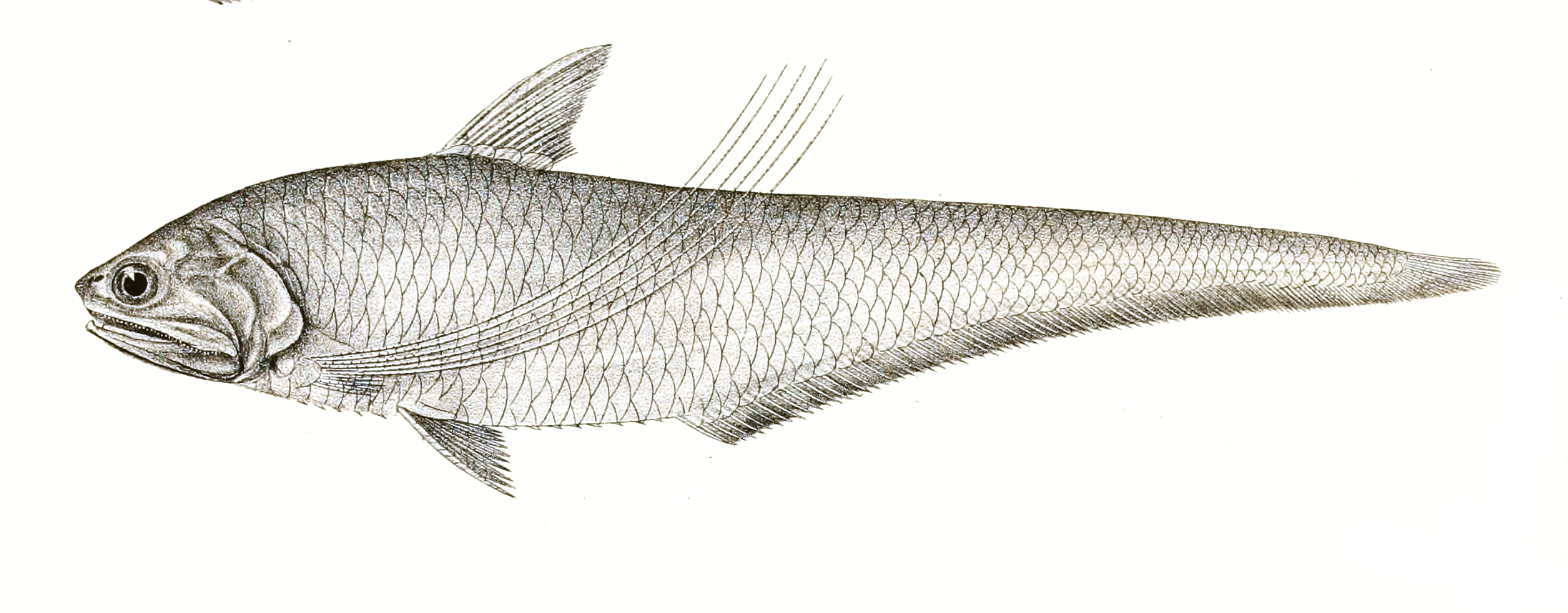
- Coilia dussumieri (above) Coilia ramcarati (below)

Scientific classification
- Kingdom: Animalia
- Phylum: Chordata
- Class: Actinopterygii
- Order: Clupeiformes
- Family: Engraulidae
- Subfamily: Coiliinae
- Genus: Coilia; J. E. Gray, 1830

Type species
- Engraulis (Coilia) hamiltonii J. E. Gray, 1830

= Coilia =

Genus of ray-finned fishes

Coilia, the grenadier anchovies, is a genus of anchovies. It currently contains 12–13 species. They are found in East, Southeast and South Asia, and mostly inhabit estuarine regions, but there are also species in coastal marine habitats and rivers (at least up to 1,000 km or 620 mi from the sea in C. brachygnathus). The largest is up to 41 cm (16 in) in length, but most species only reach around half that size.

It derives its generic name coilia from the Greek koilia, meaning "hollow" or "abdomen".

== Species ==
There are 13 species:

- Coilia borneensis Bleeker, 1852 (Bornean grenadier anchovy)
- Coilia brachygnathus Kreyenberg & Pappenheim, 1908 (Yangtze grenadier anchovy)
- Coilia coomansi Hardenberg, 1934 (Cooman's grenadier anchovy)
- Coilia dussumieri Valenciennes, 1848 (Goldspotted grenadier anchovy)
- Coilia grayii J. Richardson, 1845 (Gray's grenadier anchovy)
- Coilia lindmani Bleeker, 1858 (Lindman's grenadier anchovy)
- Coilia macrognathos Bleeker, 1852 (Longjaw grenadier anchovy)
- Coilia mystus (Linnaeus, 1758) (Osbeck's grenadier anchovy)
- Coilia nasus Temminck & Schlegel, 1846 (Japanese grenadier anchovy)
- Coilia neglecta Whitehead, 1967 (Neglected grenadier anchovy)
- Coilia ramcarati (F. Hamilton, 1822) (Ramcarat grenadier anchovy)
- Coilia rebentischii Bleeker, 1858 (Many-fingered grenadier anchovy)
- Coilia reynaldi Valenciennes, 1848 (Reynald's grenadier anchovy)
