= Microphysogobio linghensis =

Scientific classification
- Kingdom: Animalia
- Phylum: Chordata
- Class: Actinopterygii
- Order: Cypriniformes
- Suborder: Cyprinoidei
- Family: Gobionidae
- Genus: Microphysogobio
- Species: M. linghensis

Binomial name
- Microphysogobio linghensis Xie, 1986

Species of fish

Microphysogobio liaohensis is a species of freshwater ray-finned fish belonging to the family Gobionidae, the gudgeons. This fish is found in the Liaohe River in China.
