= Squalidus maii =

Conservation status
- Data Deficient (IUCN 3.1)

Scientific classification
- Kingdom: Animalia
- Phylum: Chordata
- Class: Actinopterygii
- Order: Cypriniformes
- Suborder: Cyprinoidei
- Family: Gobionidae
- Genus: Squalidus
- Species: S. maii

Binomial name
- Squalidus maii (A. Doi, 2000)

Synonyms
- Parasqualidus maii Doi, 2000

Species of fish

Squalidus maii is a species of freshwater ray-finned fish belonging to the family Gobionidae, the gudgeons. This species is found in Vietnam.

The fish was discovered in 1997 and named in honor of Mai Dinh Yen (b. 1933), Professor of Hanoi Science University and freshwater fish taxonomist.

== Habitat ==
The original fish were found in a small river stream, about 25 m (82 ft) wide and 50–100 cm (20–39 in) deep. The stream had a soft mud bottom.
