= Microphysogobio chenhsienensis =

Conservation status
- Least Concern (IUCN 3.1)

Scientific classification
- Kingdom: Animalia
- Phylum: Chordata
- Class: Actinopterygii
- Order: Cypriniformes
- Suborder: Cyprinoidei
- Family: Gobionidae
- Genus: Microphysogobio
- Species: M. chenhsienensis

Binomial name
- Microphysogobio chenhsienensis (P. W. Fang, 1938)

Synonyms
- Huigobio chenhsienensis P. W. Fang, 1938

Species of fish

Microphysogobio chenhsienensis is a species of freshwater ray-finned fish belonging to the family Gobionidae, the gudgeons. This species is known only in the Cao'ejiang and Zhujiang Rivers in China. This species can reach a length of 8.3 centimetres (3.3 in) SL. It is of minor importance to local commercial fisheries.
