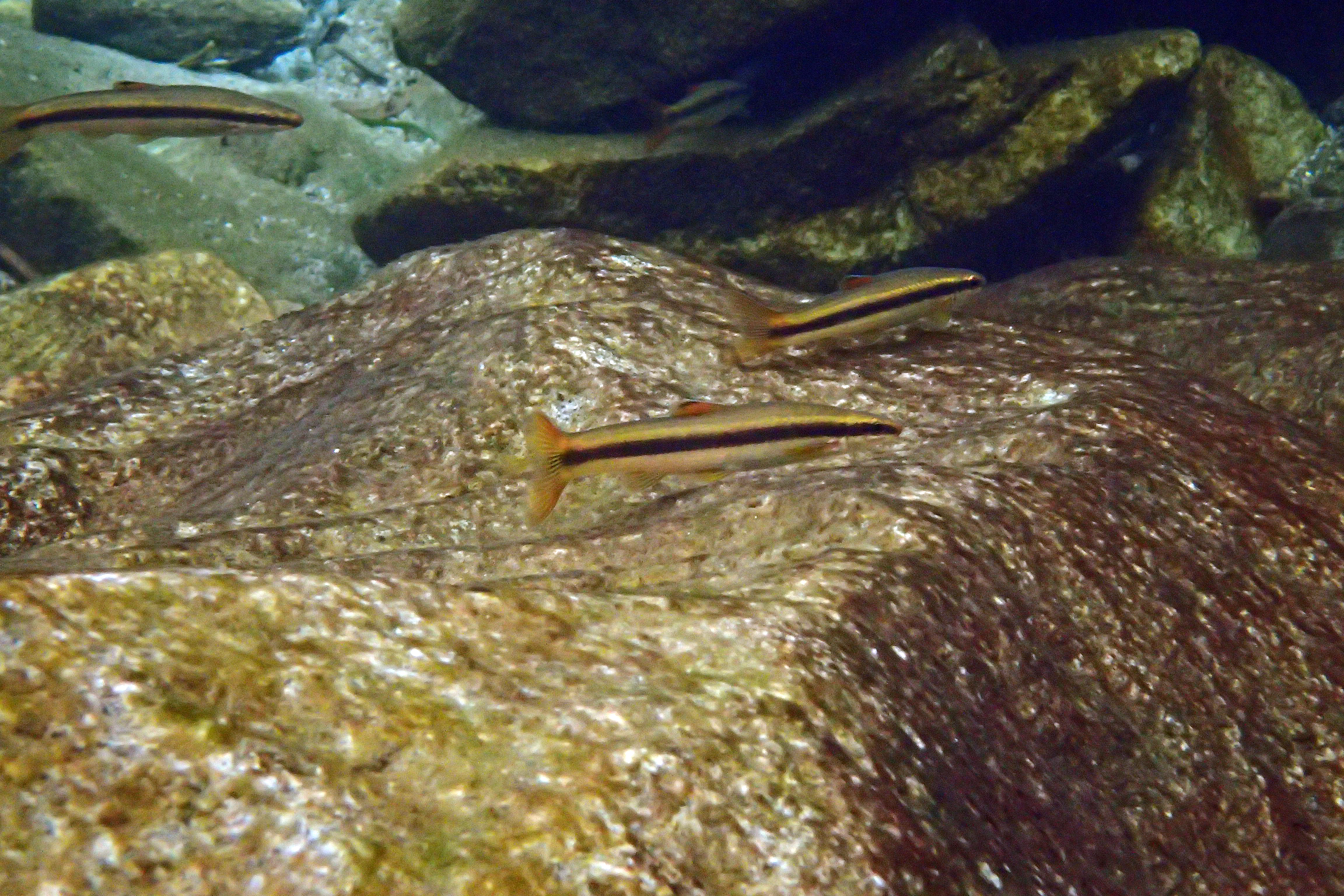

Scientific classification
- Kingdom: Animalia
- Phylum: Chordata
- Class: Actinopterygii
- Order: Cypriniformes
- Suborder: Cyprinoidei
- Family: Gobionidae
- Genus: Pseudopungtungia
- Species: P. tenuicorpus

Binomial name
- Pseudopungtungia tenuicorpus S. R. Jeon & K. C. Choi, 1980

= Pseudopungtungia tenuicorpus =

Species of fish

Pseudopungtungia tenuicorpus, or the slender shinner is a species of freshwater ray-finned fish belonging to the family Gobionidae, the gudgeons. This species is endemic to the Korean Peninsula.
