= Rainbow gudgeon =

Scientific classification
- Kingdom: Animalia
- Phylum: Chordata
- Class: Actinopterygii
- Order: Cypriniformes
- Suborder: Cyprinoidei
- Family: Gobionidae
- Genus: Sarcocheilichthys
- Species: S. nigripinnis

Binomial name
- Sarcocheilichthys nigripinnis (Günther, 1873)

Synonyms
- Gobio nigripinnis Günther, 1873; Pseudogobio maculatus Günther, 1888; Georgichthys scaphignathus Nichols, 1918; Sarcocheilichthys morii D. S. Jordan & Hubbs, 1925; Sarcocheilichthys nigripinnis tungting Nichols & Pope, 1927

Species of cyprinid fish

The rainbow gudgeon (Sarcocheilichthys nigripinnis) is a species of freshwater ray-finned fish belonging to the family Gobionidae, the gudgeons. This species is found in China, Taiwan, and the Korean peninsula.
