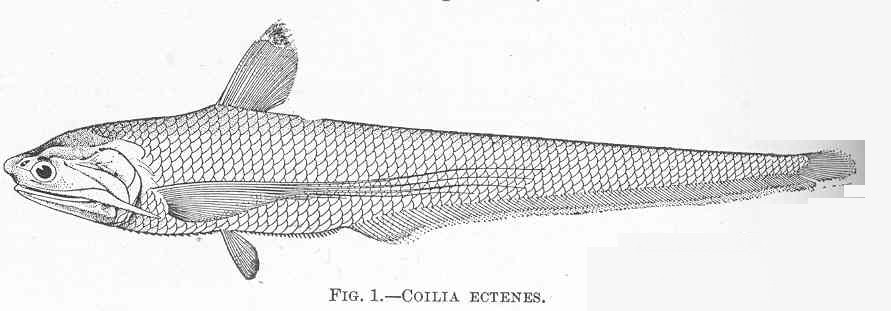

Scientific classification
- Kingdom: Animalia
- Phylum: Chordata
- Class: Actinopterygii
- Division: Teleostei
- Order: Clupeiformes
- Family: Engraulidae
- Genus: Coilia
- Species: C. nasus

Binomial name
- Coilia nasus Temminck & Schlegel, 1846

Synonyms
- Coilia ectenes Jordan & Seale, 1905

= Coilia nasus =

Species of ray-finned fish

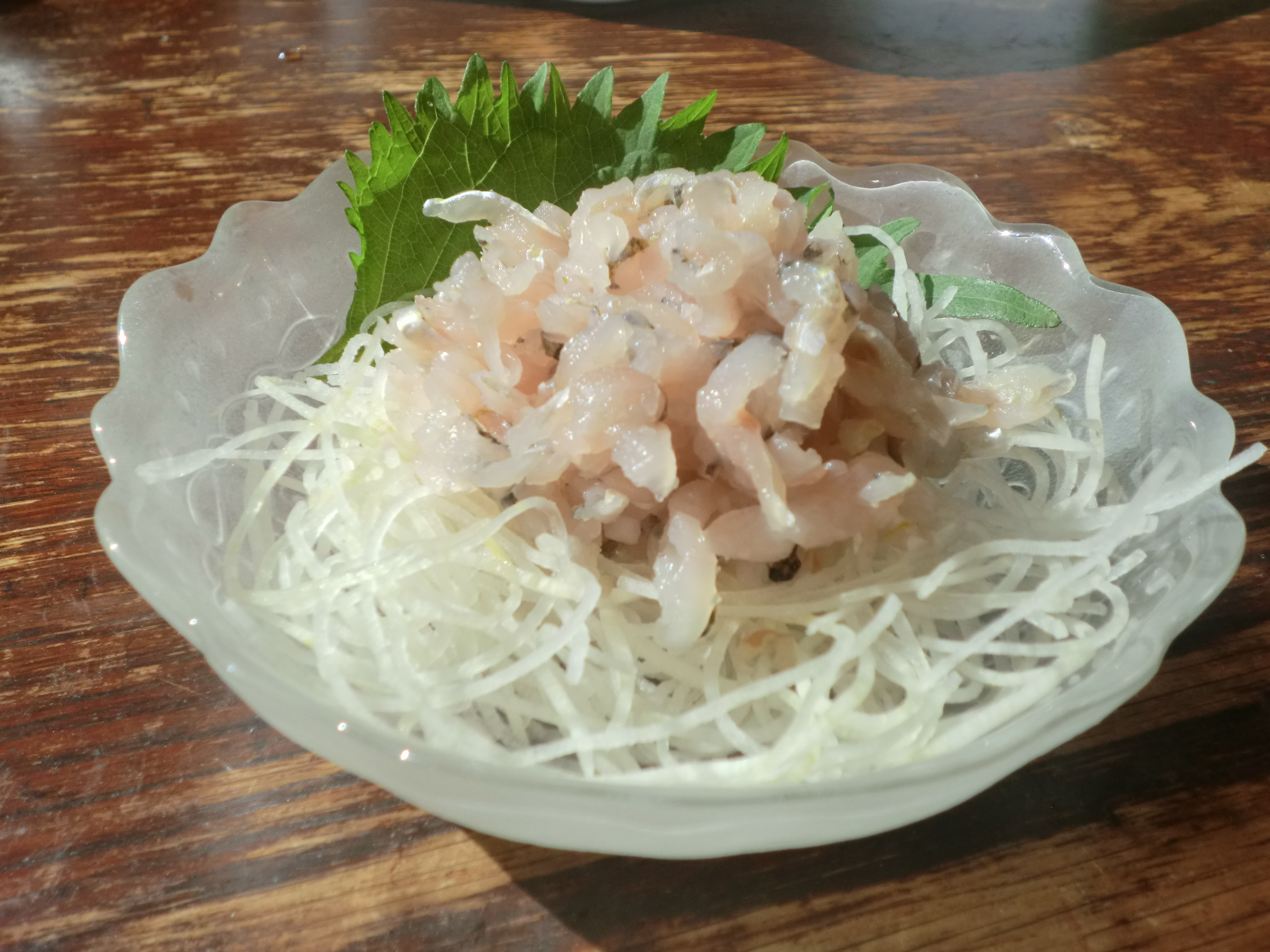
Sashimi of etsu

Coilia nasus, commonly known as the Japanese grenadier anchovy or Chinese tapertail anchovy, is a species of ray-finned fish in the anchovy family Engraulidae. It grows to 41 cm (16 in) total length, making it one of the largest species of its genus.

== Distribution and habitat ==
Coilia nasus is found in marine, brackish and freshwater environments at depths of up to 50 m (160 ft). In saltwater, it is distributed in the northwest Pacific, between 21–42°N and 109–134°E, or from Guangdong in China to the west coast of the Korean Peninsula and the Ariake Sea in southwestern Japan. In freshwater, it is distributed in various rivers that flow into the aforementioned seas and various lakes connecting these rivers in China, Japan and the Korean Peninsula.

Coilia nasus is an anadromous fish species. In China, for example, some populations migrate every spring up the Yangtze River before their final gonadal maturation in order to spawn in the middle and lower reaches of the Yangtze. After this, the mature fish migrate back to sea. There are also populations resident in freshwater lakes during their entire life cycle, making this species an interesting model of partial migration or migratory dimorphism, and studies have been conducted to understand this better, including at the molecular and genetic levels.

== Relationship with humans ==
In China, Coilia nasus is called, among other names, 刀鱼 or 刀鲚. In Japan, it is called 鮆 or エツ (etsu). In South Korea, it is called 웅어 (ungeo).

A traditional delicacy, Coilia nasus is commercially fished in China, Japan and South Korea. In China, it is one of the most expensive fish sold, with the anadromous populations fetching higher prices than the freshwater-only populations. Hence, the industry is mostly focused on the Yellow Sea, East China Sea and the Yangtze River. This species is also farmed in China.

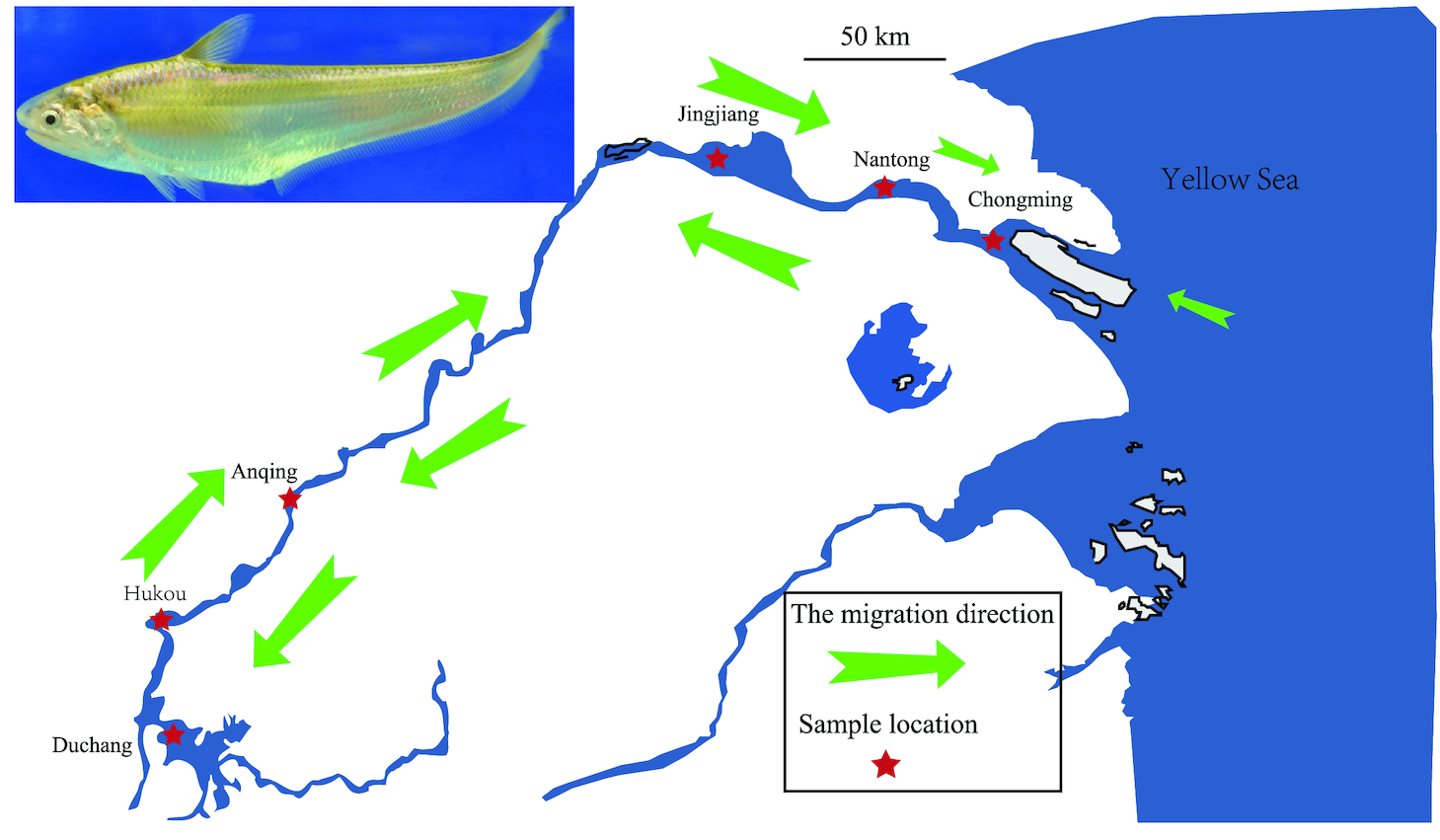
Seasonal migration and migratory dimorphism of Coilia nasus
