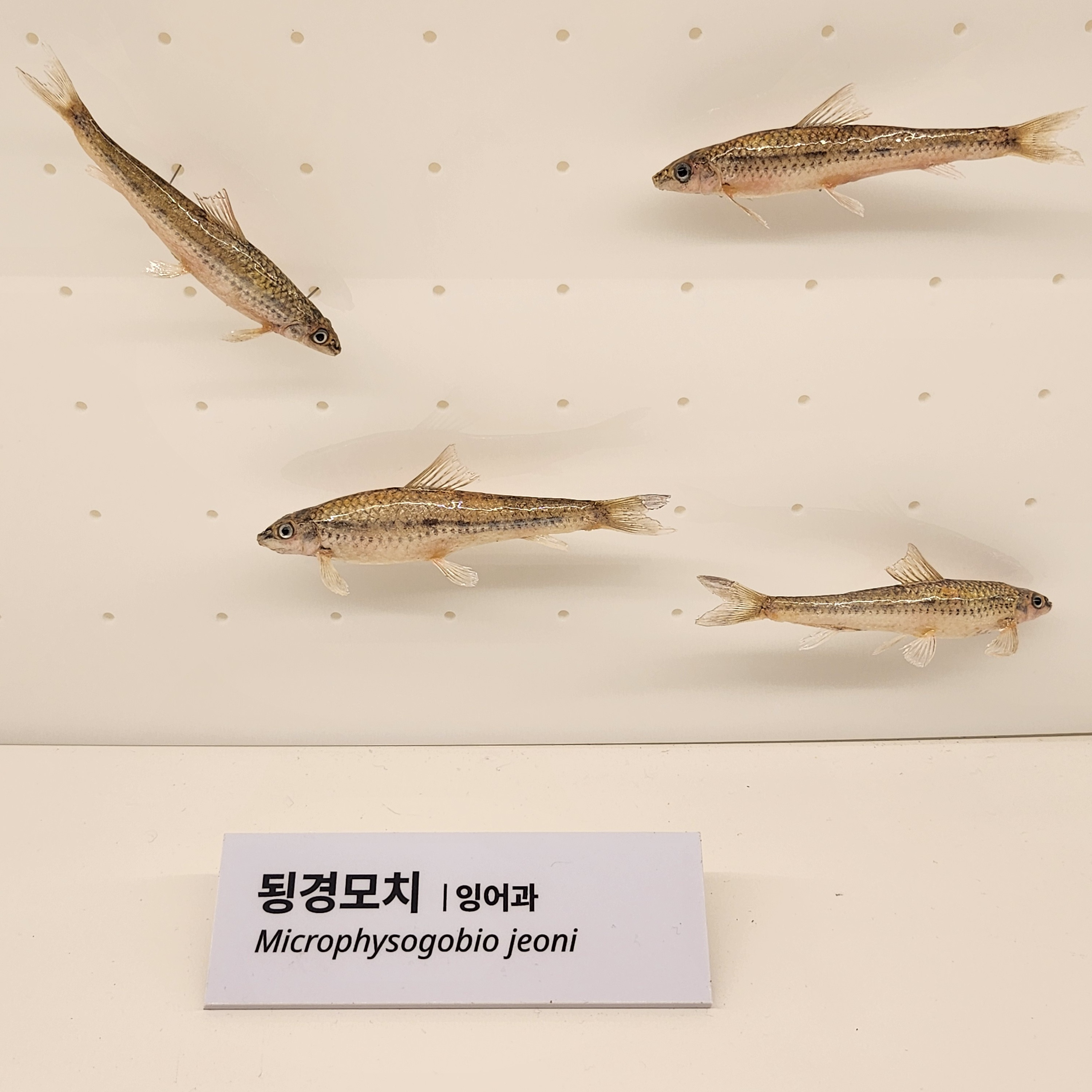

Scientific classification
- Kingdom: Animalia
- Phylum: Chordata
- Class: Actinopterygii
- Order: Cypriniformes
- Suborder: Cyprinoidei
- Family: Gobionidae
- Genus: Microphysogobio
- Species: M. jeoni

Binomial name
- Microphysogobio jeoni I. S. Kim & Yang, 1999

= Microphysogobio jeoni =

Species of fish

Microphysogobio jeoni is a species of freshwater ray-finned fish belonging to the family Gobionidae, the gudgeons. This fish is endemic to the Korean peninsula.

Named in honor of Sang-Rin Jeon, professor at Sangmyong University (Seoul, Korea), for his contributions to the study of ichthyology in Korea.
