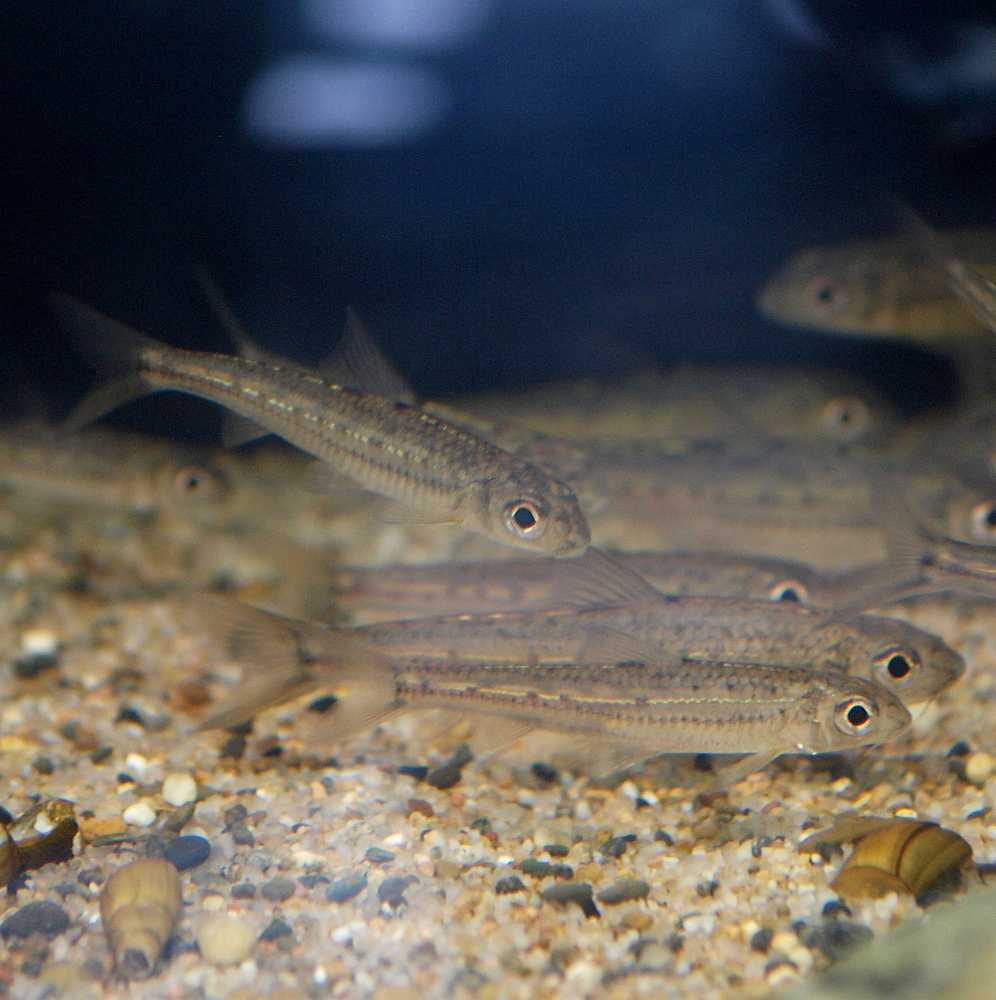
- Squalidus japonicus japonicus

Conservation status
- Least Concern (IUCN 3.1)

Scientific classification
- Kingdom: Animalia
- Phylum: Chordata
- Class: Actinopterygii
- Order: Cypriniformes
- Suborder: Cyprinoidei
- Family: Gobionidae
- Genus: Squalidus
- Species: S. japonicus

Binomial name
- Squalidus japonicus (Sauvage, 1883)

Synonyms
- Squalius japonicus Sauvage, 1883; Gobio mayedae D. S. Jordan & Snyder, 1900; Leucogobio coreanus Berg, 1906

= Squalidus japonicus =

Species of fish

Squalidus japonicus is a species of freshwater ray-finned fish belonging to the family Gobionidae, the gudgeons. This species is found in Japan and the Korean peninsula.
