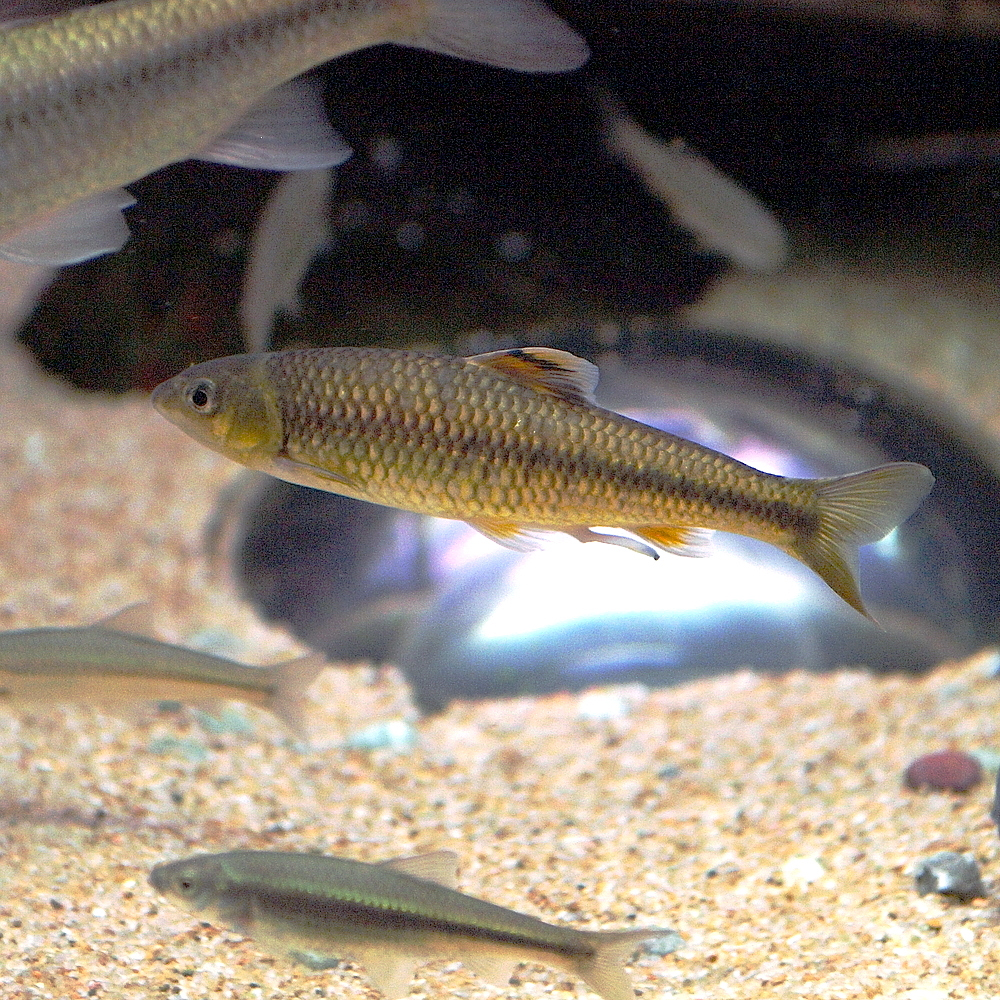
- Sarcocheilichthys variegatus microoculus

Conservation status
- Least Concern (IUCN 3.1)

Scientific classification
- Kingdom: Animalia
- Phylum: Chordata
- Class: Actinopterygii
- Order: Cypriniformes
- Suborder: Cyprinoidei
- Family: Gobionidae
- Genus: Sarcocheilichthys
- Species: S. variegatus

Binomial name
- Sarcocheilichthys variegatus (Temminck & Schlegel, 1846)

Synonyms
- Leuciscus variegatus Temminck & Schlegel, 1846; Sarcocheilichthys koreensis Mori, 1927; Sarcocheilichthys microoculus Mori, 1927; Sarcocheilichthys wakiyae Mori, 1927

= Sarcocheilichthys variegatus =

Species of fish

Sarcocheilichthys variegatus is a species of freshwater ray-finned fish belonging to the family Gobionidae, the gudgeons. This fish is endemic to Japan.
