= Squalidus multimaculatus =

Conservation status
- Least Concern (IUCN 3.1)

Scientific classification
- Kingdom: Animalia
- Phylum: Chordata
- Class: Actinopterygii
- Order: Cypriniformes
- Suborder: Cyprinoidei
- Family: Gobionidae
- Genus: Squalidus
- Species: S. multimaculatus

Binomial name
- Squalidus multimaculatus K. Hosoya & S. R. Jeon, 1984

Species of fish

Squalidus multimaculatus is a species of freshwater ray-finned fish belonging to the family Gobionidae, the gudgeons. This species is endemic to South Korea.
