= Microphysogobio rapidus =

Conservation status
- Critically Endangered (IUCN 3.1)

Scientific classification
- Kingdom: Animalia
- Phylum: Chordata
- Class: Actinopterygii
- Order: Cypriniformes
- Suborder: Cyprinoidei
- Family: Gobionidae
- Genus: Microphysogobio
- Species: M. rapidus

Binomial name
- Microphysogobio rapidus B. S. Chae & H. J. Yang, 1999

Species of fish

Microphysogobio rapidus, the rapid gudgeon, is a critically endangered species of freshwater ray-finned fish belonging to the family Gobionidae, the gudgeons. This fish is endemic to South Korea.
