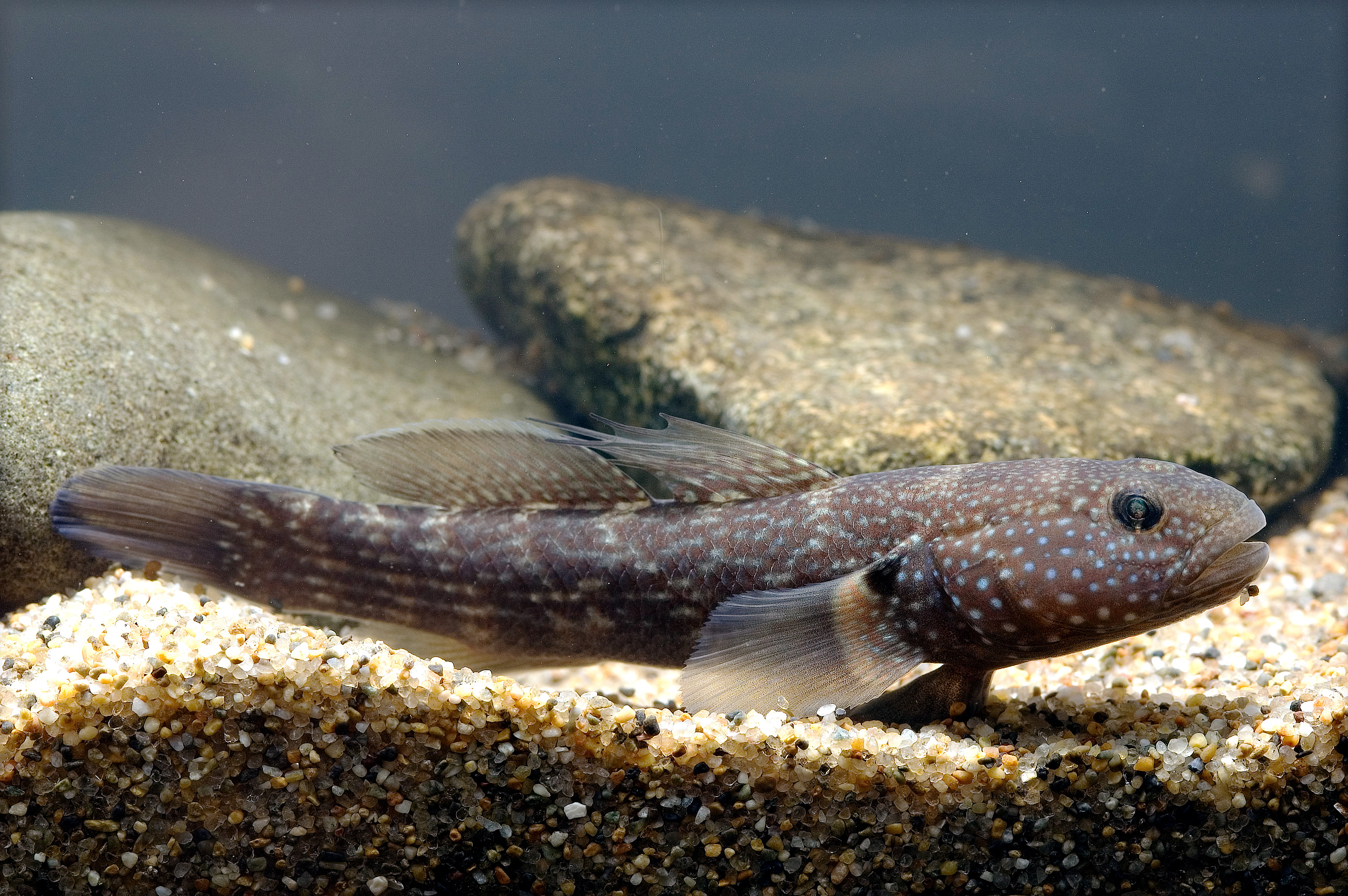

Conservation status
- Least Concern (IUCN 3.1)

Scientific classification
- Kingdom: Animalia
- Phylum: Chordata
- Class: Actinopterygii
- Order: Gobiiformes
- Family: Oxudercidae
- Genus: Tridentiger
- Species: T. brevispinis

Binomial name
- Tridentiger brevispinis Katsuyama, R. Arai & M. Nakamura, 1972

Synonyms
- Tridentiger obscurus brevispinis Katsuyama, R. Arai & M. Nakamura, 1972; Tridentiger kuroiwae brevispinis Katsuyama, R. Arai & M. Nakamura, 1972

= Tridentiger brevispinis =

Species of fish

Tridentiger brevispinis is a species of goby native to marine, brackish and fresh waters along the coasts of northeastern Asia. This species can reach a length of 10 centimetres (3.9 in) TL. It is important to local commercial fisheries.
