= Microphysogobio yaluensis =

Scientific classification
- Kingdom: Animalia
- Phylum: Chordata
- Class: Actinopterygii
- Order: Cypriniformes
- Suborder: Cyprinoidei
- Family: Gobionidae
- Genus: Microphysogobio
- Species: M. yaluensis

Binomial name
- Microphysogobio yaluensis (Mori, 1928)

Synonyms
- Pseudogobio yaluensis Mori, 1928; Microphysogobio tungtingensis uchidaiBă nărescu & Nalbant, 1973; Microphysogobio uchidai Bănărescu & Nalbant, 1973

Species of fish

Microphysogobio yaluensis, or dol-ma-ja, is a species of freshwater ray-finned fish belonging to the family Gobionidae, the gudgeons. This fish is endemic to the Korean peninsula.
