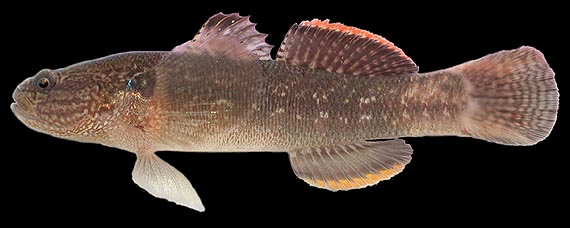

Conservation status
- Least Concern (IUCN 3.1)

Scientific classification
- Kingdom: Animalia
- Phylum: Chordata
- Class: Actinopterygii
- Order: Gobiiformes
- Family: Oxudercidae
- Genus: Tridentiger
- Species: T. bifasciatus

Binomial name
- Tridentiger bifasciatus Steindachner, 1881

= Shimofuri goby =

Species of fish

The Shimofuri goby (Tridentiger bifasciatus) is found in fresh and brackish waters. However, it is most abundant in low-salinity environments. The fish has typical features consistent with the family Gobiidae and grows to a maximum of 12 centimetres (4.7 in). These characteristics include two pelvic fins united from a conical sucking disk, a spiny anterior and a soft posterior dorsal fin, and eyes near the top of the head. These fins typically have 6-7 spines and 11-14 rays with orange tints on the edges. Tridentiger bifasciatus has a flat wide head and is highly variable in color, but generally light or dark brown with midlateral spots and minuscule white spots on the head.

The native range of Tridentiger bifasciatus is fresh and brackish water habitats in Asia. This includes Japan, Korea, China, Taiwan, and the former Soviet Union.

The Shimofuri goby is widely distributed in the San Francisco estuary. By 1990, the species traveled down to the Pyramid Lake in Los Angeles County. By 2016, the Shimofuri goby has been found in seven southern California reservoirs. There are 9 total locations with observations that include Los Angeles, Lower Sacramento, San Diego, San Francisco Bay, San Joaquin Delta, San Pablo Bay, Santa Clara, Santa Margarita, and Suisun Bay. The Shimofuri goby is still distributed in its native Asian estuaries which include China, South Korea, Japan, and Russia.

== Site and Year of Introduction ==
Tridentiger bifasciatus was first identified in the Suisun Marsh in 1985. This marsh is the largest brackish, mixture of salt and fresh body of water on the west coast. The Suisun Marsh is located within the upper San Francisco estuary, connecting to the San Francisco Bay. This bay is known for its international cargo ship ports, which is thought to be the reason for the high level of non-native species throughout the connecting bodies of water. The gobies spread from the Suisun Marsh into the connecting Sacramento-San Joaquin Delta which then provided the path into the aqueducts of the California State Water Project in 1993. The CSWP accesses multiple lakes and reservoirs where the Shimofuri goby has been detected until the present day. In 2022, Shimofuri gobies was recorded for the first time in Europe, in the Ghent–Terneuzen Canal, Belgium.

== Modes of Distribution and Introduction ==
The Shimofuri goby is believed to have been introduced through ballast water in 1985. Ballast water is the fluid within a ship, typically a cargo ship, that is used to maintain stability and increase maneuverability when the ships do not have a heavy load on board. The ballast water is pumped off of a ship when cargo is added, to offset the weight difference. This removal of water from the cargo provides a vector for species to travel from one destination to another that otherwise would not be possible.

== Factors in Establishment ==
The Shimofuri goby can withstand a wide range of temperatures and salinity conditions. The goby can tolerate gradual temperature increases up to 37 °C (99 °F) and salinity increases up to 17 PSU. This large range of temperature and salinity resilience allows the Shimofuri goby to compete with native species in the San Francisco Estuary. These factors show the high ecological amplitude of the Shimofuri goby. In addition, the Shimofuri goby has seasonal shifting of dominant diets, meaning they can change their preferred diet according to the availability of prey resources in the environment. These characteristics, as well as direct predation upon local prey resources and competition of resources with native species, demonstrate the high invasiveness of the Shimofuri goby.

== Ecological Role ==
The Shimofuri goby primarily feeds on benthic invertebrates, but also predates fish, fish eggs, and detritus. The goby likely competes with the native species for seasonally abundant prey/ resources. It specializes in seasonally abundant prey and can exploit two novel food sources. In addition, Shimofuri gobies are generalist predators meaning they have several alternative prey species. The goby will typically predate the prey that is the most environmentally available. This makes them competitors to native species in the newly established habitat. However, there has not been continued monitoring to further comprehend the ecological role that the introduction of Shimofuri goby has on their new environment.

== Threats ==
The Shimofuri goby is believed to be a threat to native tidewater goby (Eucyclogobius newberryi) because the two species have very similar habitat and dietary preferences. The overlap in diet includes oligochaetes, polychaetes, ostracods, copepods, and isopods. The endangered tidewater goby plays a large role in estuary food webs, so the diminishing population due to the invasive Shimofuri goby impacts several other species within this ecosystem. This native goby is a main food source of shorebirds, the southern steelhead trout, and the California habitat. A decrease in population levels of the tidewater goby would create a further endangerment of the species, and remove a vital food source to predators that are also endangered species (southern steelhead). These changes in population numbers within California estuaries would impact the prey and predators of each species that exist in connection to the tidewater goby, because of their reduction in numbers by the Shimofuri goby.
