= Tamezo Mori =

Japanese naturalist (1884–1962)

Tamezo Mori (森 為三, Mori Tamezō), (1884–1962) was a Japanese naturalist in Chōsen (1910–1945). He taught at a preparatory school for Keijō Imperial University in Seoul from 1909 until he was expelled by the American forces in 1945. Primarily an ichthyologist, he published numerous works on the zoology of the Korean Peninsula and Manchuria. Some of these, such as his Checklist of the Fishes of Korea and the 1934 Coloured Butterflies from Korea, are still in print.
