= Bistra Forest =

Protected area in Romania

Bistra Forest Romanian: Pădurea Bistra
- Location within Romania
- Interactive map of Bistra Forest

Geography
- Location: Timiș County, Romania
- Coordinates: 45°45′43″N 21°20′28″E
- Area: 19.9 ha (49 acres)

Administration
- Status: Protected area
- Established: 1995

Ecology
- Dominant tree species: Quercus sp.

Bistra Forest (Romanian: Pădurea Bistra) is a nationally protected area classified as IUCN Category IV, located in Timiș County, within the administrative territories of Ghiroda and Moșnița Nouă communes. It represents the last remaining fragment of the former Bucovăț Forest, which once covered the central plain of the Timiș River before large-scale deforestation in the 18th century, carried out to establish villages and expand agricultural land.

The forest hosts Codru Festival, the only eco-friendly music festival in Romania.

== Location ==
The forest reserve, covering an area of 19.9 hectares, is situated in the northern part of Timiș County, within the Bega meadow, between the Bega and Timiș rivers. It lies 12 kilometers from Timișoara, on the territory of the Ghiroda and Moșnița Nouă communes.

Within the reserve, two forest areas are officially designated:

- 5H – seed harvesting reserve
- 5J – secular forest of special value

== Flora and fauna ==
Bistra Forest is designated as a natural area of community interest, a status granted by Law No. 5 of March 6, 2000. It is also recognized as an avifaunal protection site due to its location along the major Pannonian–Bulgarian bird migration route. For foresters, it has economic value as a seed lot.

Bistra Forest is notable for preserving the most densely concentrated natural oak grove in the Banat lowlands, with trees aged between 130 and 150 years. In addition to oak, it also contains extensive areas of ash, along with a natural mix of lowland species such as Salix alba (white willow), Populus alba (white poplar), Ulmus laevis (white elm), and Alnus glutinosa (alder).

The fauna of Bistra Forest is diverse, including mammals, amphibians, fish, and insects—some of which are protected at the European level. Notable species include the common pipistrelle, the fire-bellied toad (classified as vulnerable and listed on the IUCN Red List), asp, spined loach, Kessler's gudgeon, bitterling, Balon's ruffe, Danubian gudgeon, streber, golden loach, and a mussel community featuring Unio crassus, a species at high risk of extinction in the wild (also listed on the IUCN Red List). Additionally, the forest is home to the rare butterfly Euphydryas maturna.
