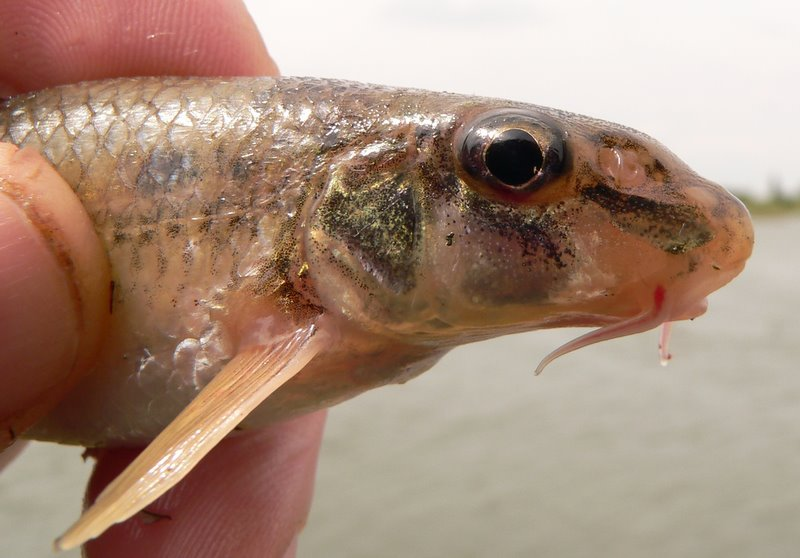
- Northern whitefin gudgeon (Romanogobio belingi)

Scientific classification
- Kingdom: Animalia
- Phylum: Chordata
- Class: Actinopterygii
- Order: Cypriniformes
- Family: Gobionidae
- Genus: Romanogobio; Bănărescu, 1961

Type species
- Gobio kesslerii Dybowski, 1862

Synonyms
- Rheogobio Bănărescu, 1961

= Romanogobio =

Genus of fishes

Romanogobio is a genus of freshwater ray-finned fish belonging to the family Gobionidae, the gudgeons. These fishes are found in Europe and Asia.

== Species ==
These are the currently recognised species in this genus:

- Romanogobio albipinnatus (Lukasch, 1933) (White-finned gudgeon)
- Romanogobio amplexilabris (Bănărescu & Nalbant, 1973)
- Romanogobio antipai (Bănărescu, 1953) (Danube Delta gudgeon)
- Romanogobio banarescui (Dimovski & Grupche, 1974) (Vardar sand gudgeon)
- Romanogobio banaticus (Bănărescu, 1960)
- Romanogobio belingi (Slastenenko, 1934) (Northern white-finned gudgeon)
- Romanogobio benacensis (Pollini, 1816)
- Romanogobio carpathorossicus (Vladykov, 1925)
- Romanogobio ciscaucasicus (Berg 1932) (North Caucasian longbarbel gudgeon)
- Romanogobio elimeius (Kattoulas, Stephanidis & Economidis, 1973)
- Romanogobio johntreadwelli (Bănărescu & Nalbant, 1973)
- Romanogobio kesslerii (Dybowski, 1862) (Kessler's gudgeon)
- Romanogobio macropterus (Kamensky, 1901) (South Caucasian gudgeon)
- Romanogobio parvus Naseka & Freyhof, 2004
- Romanogobio pentatrichus Naseka & Bogutskaya, 1998 (Kuban long-barbelled gudgeon)
- Romanogobio persus (Günther 1899) (Kura gudgeon)
- Romanogobio skywalkeri Friedrich, Wiesner, Zangl, Daill, Freyhof & Koblmüller, 2018
- Romanogobio tanaiticus Naseka, 2001 (Don whitefin gudgeon)
- Romanogobio tenuicorpus (Mori 1934) (Amur whitefin gudgeon)
- Romanogobio uranoscopus (Agassiz. 1828)
- Romanogobio vladykovi (P.-W. Fang, 1943) (Danube whitefin gudgeon)
