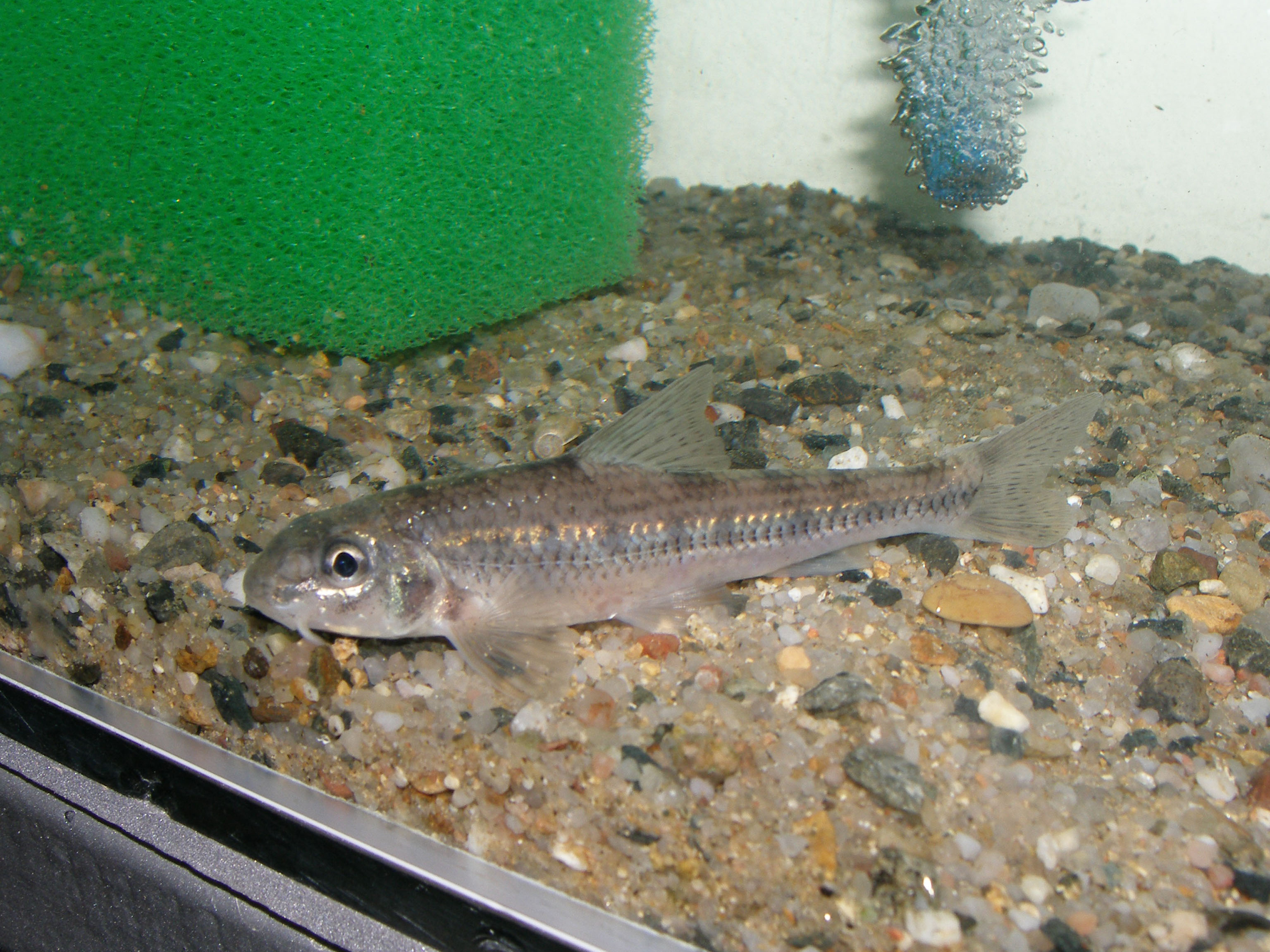
- from the Morava River, Czech Republic

Conservation status
- Least Concern (IUCN 3.1)

Scientific classification
- Kingdom: Animalia
- Phylum: Chordata
- Class: Actinopterygii
- Order: Cypriniformes
- Suborder: Cyprinoidei
- Family: Gobionidae
- Genus: Romanogobio
- Species: R. vladykovi

Binomial name
- Romanogobio vladykovi (P. W. Fang, 1943)

Synonyms
- Gobio vladykovi P. W. Fang, 1943

= Danube whitefin gudgeon =

Species of fish

The Danube whitefin gudgeon (Romanogobio vladykovi) is a species of freshwater ray-finned fish belonging to the family Gobionidae, the gudgeons. It is distributed in the drainage of the Danube river in Europe. The species has been known to reach a length of 11.5 cm (4.5 in); the oldest reported age for the species is 4 years. Its diet includes insect larvae.

== Etymology ==
The scientific name of the species was chosen in honor of Vadim D. Vladykov (1898–1986), a Ukrainian ichthyologist.

== Sources ==
- Froese, Rainer; Pauly, Daniel (eds.). "Romanogobio vladykovi". FishBase. November 2014 version.
