= Romanogobio carpathorossicus =

Conservation status
- Least Concern (IUCN 3.1)

Scientific classification
- Kingdom: Animalia
- Phylum: Chordata
- Class: Actinopterygii
- Order: Cypriniformes
- Suborder: Cyprinoidei
- Family: Gobionidae
- Genus: Romanogobio
- Species: R. carpathorossicus

Binomial name
- Romanogobio carpathorossicus (Vladykov, 1925)

Synonyms
- Gobio uranoscopus carpathorossicus Vladykov, 1925

Species of fish

Romanogobio carpathorossicus, the Romanian gudgeon, is a species of freshwater ray-finned fish belonging to the family Gobionidae, the gudgeons. This fish is found in the Danube River system in Eastern and Central Europe.
