= Iris perrieri =

Scientific classification
- Kingdom: Plantae
- Clade: Embryophytes
- Clade: Tracheophytes
- Clade: Angiosperms
- Clade: Monocots
- Order: Asparagales
- Family: Iridaceae
- Genus: Iris
- Subgenus: Iris subg. Iris
- Section: Iris sect. Iris
- Species: I. perrieri

Binomial name
- Iris perrieri Marc Simonet ex P. Fourn

Synonyms
- Iris perrieri Simonet ex N.Service

Species of plant

Iris perrieri is a plant species in the genus Iris; it is also in the subgenus Iris. It is a rhizomatous perennial, from the Savoy Alps in southern France and recently in Italy. It has green, deeply ribbed, sickle shaped leaves, a slender stem with a branch (from the middle), 1–3 scented flowers that are violet or purple, with a white or pale blue beard. It is rarely cultivated as an ornamental plant in temperate regions, due to its rarity in the wild. It was once thought to be a form of Iris aphylla, before cell (chromosome) analysis determined it to be a separate species.

== Description ==
It is similar in form to Iris aphylla, but has various differences including, stem branching, spathes, the falls, styles crests and seeds.

It has a thick, compact rhizome, that has several branching buds. Like other bearded irises, it grows partially buried, horizontally across the ground.

It has green, falcate (sickle-shaped) leaves, that are very heavily ribbed, so much so that they appear corrugated or pleated. They can grow up to between 22 and 28 cm (9 and 11 in) long, and between 2.0 and 2.4 cm wide. They are shorter than Iris aphylla.

It has a slender stem or peduncle, that can grow up to between 10 and 30 cm (4 and 12 in) tall. Compared to Iris aphylla, it branches (or pedicels) from the middle of the stem, (on Iris aphylla, it branches close to the base or rhizome,) it very rarely has 2 branches.

The stem has green, inflated, spathe (leaf of the flower bud), They are between 3.5 and 6 cm (1 and 2 in) long. They also remain green, after the plant has flowered, unlike some others which turn papery. The large spathe leaf, partially, encases the perianth tube. If the plant does not have a branch, it only has 1 spathe.

The stem (and the branch) can hold between 1 and 3 flowers, but normally 2 flowers, blooming between April and May. The fragrant flowers, come in shades of violet, or purple.

Like other irises, it has 2 pairs of petals, 3 large sepals (outer petals), known as the 'falls' and 3 inner, smaller petals (or tepals), known as the 'standards'. The falls are obovate to cuneate (wedge shaped), and 5–7 cm (2–3 in) long, and 2.2–3 cm wide. They have lots of dark veining, and in the centre, there is a row of short hairs, a 'beard', which are white or pale blue. Near to the stem, the beard has a yellow or orange tip. The standards are oblong shaped, and a similar length to the falls, 5.4–7 cm (2–3 in) long, and 2.2–3 cm wide.

It has a 6 grooved and rounded ovary, which is 1.2–1.4 cm long and 0.5–0.6 cm wide. It has a perianth tube is 1.7–2 cm long, the style branch is normally pale violet with darker keels (connecting points) and 1–1.6 cm long. It also has a pale violet filament, which is 1.2–1.7 cm long and a 1–1.2 cm long anther.

After the iris has flowered, in mid June, it produces an oblong shaped seed capsule, which is visibly grooved. Inside the capsule, are pyriform (pear shaped), reddish brown and wrinkled seeds. The seeds are dispersed by animals or grow up near to the parent plants.

=== Biochemistry ===
In 1956, a karyotype analysis was carried out on 40 species of Iris, belonging to the subgenera Eupogoniris and Pogoniris. It found that 24-chromosome tall bearded species could e divided into 3 karyotypes of Iris pallida. Iris kashmiriana has 2 pairs of median-constricted marker chromosomes, Iris illyrica, Iris cengialti, and Iris imbricata, lastly Iris variegata, Iris reginae (now classified as a synonym of Iris variegata), and Iris perrieri all have no median-constricted chromosomes.

In 2008, a genetic and morphological study was carried out on Iris aphylla populations in Italy. Some populations (in Piemonte) were re-classified as Iris perrieri and plants labelled as Iris benacensis were not either Iris perrieri or Iris aphylla.

In 2012, a study was carried out on the flora of Italy, using Ellenberg's Indicator values (relating to moisture, light, climate and salinity) for Iris benacensis and Iris perrieri.

As most irises are diploid, having two sets of chromosomes, this can be used to identify hybrids and classification of groupings. It is a diploid, and has a chromosome count of 2n=24, counted in 1956, by Mitra. The karyotype was described as being more similar to Iris variegata than to Iris aphylla.

== Taxonomy ==
It has the common name of 'Perrieri iris', or 'Perrier iris'.

The Latin specific epithet perrieri refers to Eugène Pierre Perrier de la Bâthie, (1825–1916), Baron E. Perrier de la Bathie, who ran a speciality plant nursery at the nearby town of Albertville.

It was found in 1890 by Baron E. Perrier and Dr Chabert (his friend), on Mount Dent d'Arcluz in the Bauges Mountains, but thought to be a form of Iris aphylla (which was at time called Iris bohemia, later classified as a synonym of Iris aphylla). In June 1894, in the 'Bulletin de l'Herbier Boissier' (Bull. Herb. Bois.), Vol.2 issue 11 on page436, Baron Perrier and Andre Songeon (1826–1905), published the iris as Iris bohemia. The plant was then published as a separate species, and described by P Fournier based on an earlier description by Simonet as Iris perrieri in Les Quartre Flore de la France, Vol.191 in 1935.

In 1985, Nigel Service published a description and history in The Iris Year Book, he then published it in The Plantsman Vol.2, on page 91 in 2003.

As it was originally thought to be a form of Iris aphylla, it has often been classed as a synonym of I. aphylla, Although it has a different chromosome morphology, Dr. L. F. Randolph (in 1959), stated that the two species were not related.

It was verified by United States Department of Agriculture and the Agricultural Research Service on 4 April 2003, and updated on 3 December 2004.

It is an accepted name, by The Plant List, but listed with no synonyms and Simonet ex N.Service as the authors.

It is listed in the Encyclopedia of Life, with Simonet ex N.Service as the authors.

It is listed in the Catalogue of Life, with Simonet ex N.Service as the authors.

It is a tentatively accepted name by the RHS.

== Distribution and habitat ==
It is native to Europe.

=== Range ===
It is found in France, within the department of Savoie, (or Savoy), near the town of Saint-Pierre-d'Albigny, and on Mount Dent d'Arclusaz, in the Bauges Mountains.

It is found in the Alps.

In 2011, it was also found in Italy, in the Maritime Alps, in the Province of Cuneo, in Gesso Valley, near to the town of Valdieri.

=== Habitat ===
It grows on the steep mountain sides, on rocky slopes, in reddish soils, made of limestone.

It can be found with other alpine species such as Aster alpinus, Globularia cordifolia and Helianthemum nummularium.

They can be found at an altitude of 1,250–1,800 m (4,100–5,910 ft) above sea level.

== Conservation ==
It is a very rare plant, with only 2–3 populations found on the mountains of Savoy, France and Piedmont, Italy.

The populations are protected, (from collection and other disturbances), and it is listed in the 'Conservatoire d'espaces naturels de Savoie' (the Conservatory of Savoy Natural Heritage)'s Red Book National Volume I.

== Cultivation ==
It is hardy (in Europe), but may not grow well in areas with wet summers.

It prefers to grow in well-drained soils, and in a sunny situation.

It is very rarely found in specialised iris nurseries, and often called Iris aphylla.

It is a slow growing and takes many years for the plant to create a colony.

Aphid Dysaphis tulipae can be found on the plant.

A herbarium specimen can be found at the Museum National d'Histoire Naturelle in Paris.

It can also be found growing in Rea Botanical Garden Piedmont, in Italy, and in the alpine botanic garden of La Jaysinia in Samoëns, Haute Savoie, France.

=== Propagation ===
Irises can generally be propagated by division, or by seed growing.

=== Hybrids and cultivars ===
It is thought that the iris could be used in hybridizing, giving better branching, small irises.

== Toxicity ==
Like many other irises, most parts of the plant are poisonous (rhizome and leaves), and if mistakenly ingested can cause stomach pains and vomiting. Also, handling the plant may cause skin irritation or an allergic reaction.

== Sources ==
- Mathew, B. 1981. The Iris. 193–194.
