= Don whitefin gudgeon =

Conservation status
- Least Concern (IUCN 3.1)

Scientific classification
- Kingdom: Animalia
- Phylum: Chordata
- Class: Actinopterygii
- Order: Cypriniformes
- Suborder: Cyprinoidei
- Family: Gobionidae
- Genus: Romanogobio
- Species: R. tanaiticus

Binomial name
- Romanogobio tanaiticus Naseka, 2001

Synonyms
- Romanogobio albipinnatus tanaiticus Naseka, 2001

Species of fish

The Don whitefin gudgeon (Romanogobio tanaiticus) s a species of freshwater ray-finned fish belonging to the family Gobionidae, the gudgeons. It is distributed in the Don River basin in Russia, and also in the Siverskyi Donets River in Ukraine. The maximal length is 10.7 cm, maximal reported age 5 years.

== Sources ==
- Froese, Rainer; Pauly, Daniel (eds.). "Romanogobio tanaiticus". FishBase. September 2012 version.
