= Romanogobio banaticus =

Scientific classification
- Kingdom: Animalia
- Phylum: Chordata
- Class: Actinopterygii
- Order: Cypriniformes
- Suborder: Cyprinoidei
- Family: Gobionidae
- Genus: Romanogobio
- Species: R. banaticus

Binomial name
- Romanogobio banaticus Bănărescu, 1960

Species of fish

Romanogobio banaticus is a species of freshwater ray-finned fish belonging to the family Gobionidae, the gudgeons. This fish is endemic to Romania.
