= Romanogobio skywalkeri =

Conservation status
- Endangered (IUCN 3.1)

Scientific classification
- Kingdom: Animalia
- Phylum: Chordata
- Class: Actinopterygii
- Order: Cypriniformes
- Suborder: Cyprinoidei
- Family: Gobionidae
- Genus: Romanogobio
- Species: R. skywalkeri

Binomial name
- Romanogobio skywalkeri Friedrich, Wiesner, Zangl, Daill, Freyhof & Koblmüller, 2018

Species of fish

Romanogobio skywalkeri is a species of freshwater ray-finned fish belonging to the family Gobionidae, the gudgeons. This fish is endemic to the Mur river in Central Europe.

R. skywalkeri is distinguished from other Romanogobio species by its slender body that lacks epithelial crests on the predorsal back, having 12-14 total pectoral-fin rays and 8½ branched dorsal-fin rays.

== Description ==
Romanogobio skywalkeri is a gudgeon that can be identified by a characteristic combination of morphological traits. Unlike several other species within Romanogobio, it does not display epithelial crests along the predorsal region. Typical meristic counts include 12–14 pectoral-fin rays in total and 8½ branched rays in the dorsal fin. These features, taken together, help separate the species from closely related congeners.

== Habitat and ecology ==
This species shows a clear preference for fast-moving, oxygen-rich water. It is restricted to the upper reaches of the Mur River in Austria, particularly in stretches that remain free-flowing and unregulated. A microhabitat study published in 2022 indicated that R. skywalkeri selects areas with specific flow velocities and substrate compositions, conditions that are increasingly rare as river systems become modified for flood control and hydropower.

== Etymology ==
The species name, skywalkeri, was chosen as a light nod to popular culture. The authors noted that the subtle green tint observed in the dorsal-fin rays reminded them of the lightsaber used by Luke Skywalker in Star Wars: Episode IV – A New Hope (1977). The epithet was therefore selected in tribute to the character.
