= Romanogobio parvus =

Conservation status
- Least Concern (IUCN 3.1)

Scientific classification
- Kingdom: Animalia
- Phylum: Chordata
- Class: Actinopterygii
- Order: Cypriniformes
- Suborder: Cyprinoidei
- Family: Gobionidae
- Genus: Romanogobio
- Species: R. parvus

Binomial name
- Romanogobio parvus Naseka & Jörg Freyhof, 2004

Species of fish

Romanogobio parvus is a species of freshwater ray-finned fish belonging to the family Gobionidae, the gudgeons. This species is endemic to the Kuban River in Russia.

This species reaches a length of 7.5 cm (3.0 in).

== Etymology ==
The fish's name means "little".
