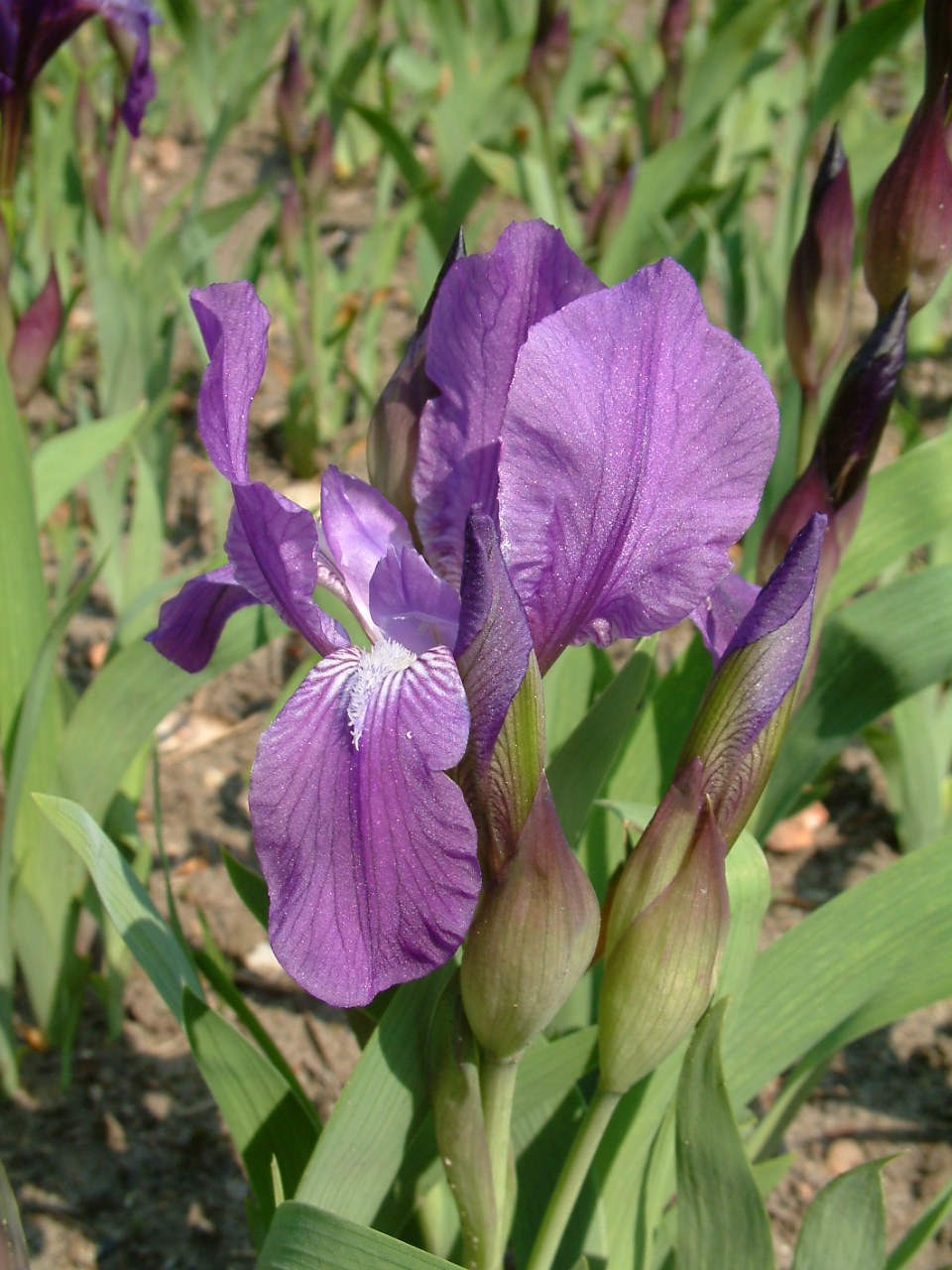

Conservation status
- Least Concern (IUCN 3.1)

Scientific classification
- Kingdom: Plantae
- Clade: Tracheophytes
- Clade: Angiosperms
- Clade: Monocots
- Order: Asparagales
- Family: Iridaceae
- Genus: Iris
- Subgenus: Iris subg. Iris
- Section: Iris sect. Iris
- Species: I. aphylla

Binomial name
- Iris aphylla L.

Synonyms
- Iris babadagica Rzazade & Golneva; Iris bifurca Steven ex Baker; Iris bisflorens Host; Iris bohemica F.W.Schmidt; Iris breviscapa Opiz; Iris clusiana Tausch; Iris dacica Beldie; Iris diantha C. Koch; Iris diantha K.Koch; Iris duerinckii Buckley; Iris extrafoliacea J.C.Mikan ex Pohl; Iris falcata Tausch; Iris fieberi Seidl; Iris hungarica Waldst. & Kit.; Iris melzeri Prodán; Iris nudicaulis Lam.; Iris polonica Fomin & Bordz.; Iris reflexa Berg; Iris rigida Sieber ex Klatt; Iris sabina N.Terracc.; Iris schmidtii Baker; Iris subtriflora Fieber ex Klatt; Iris tenorei Parl.

= Iris aphylla =

Species of plant

Iris aphylla (also known as leafless iris, table iris or stool iris) is a species in the genus Iris, it is also in the subgenus Iris, and in the section Iris. It is a rhizomatous perennial, from Asia to Europe. It is found in Azerbaijan, Russian Federation, Czech Republic, Germany, Hungary, Poland, Belarus, Ukraine, Bulgaria, Albania, Former Yugoslavia, Italy, Romania and France. It has dark green or bright green, sword-shaped, long grass-like leaves, that die/fade away in the winter. It also has a slender stem, with several branches and green and purplish spathes. It has 3–5 large flowers, in shades of bright purple, purple, violet, dark blue, blue-violet and dark violet, which bloom between spring and early summer. Occasionally, they re-bloom in the autumn, before the seed capsule is formed. It is cultivated as an ornamental plant in temperate regions.

== Description ==
It is a variable species in the wild, especially in flower colour, height of stem and leaves, and length of perianth tube (of the flower).

Iris aphylla is slightly shorter than Iris germanica (a commonly cultivated garden iris), but which it is very closely related.

It has short, tuberous rhizome, that is 18–22 mm in diameter. It has a stout and thick rhizome, with several stem buds. The rhizome creeps along the ground, creating dense clumps of plants.

It has basal leaves (rising from the rhizome), that are curved, acuminate (pointed) and 1–3 cm wide. They are slightly smaller than Iris aphylla, and shorter than the flowering stem. They have 5–6 ribs, and curve outwards.

It has dark green, or intense green leaves, that rise directly from rhizome. They later fade to a grey-green colour. They are often flushed purple at the base.They are ensiform (sword shaped), glaucescent, and falcate (sickle-shaped). They can grow up to between 15 and 45 cm (6 and 18 in) long, and between 2 and 3 cm wide. The outer leaves are normally shorter than the inner leaves. They are sometimes longer than the flower stems. It is deciduous. Meaning that the leaves die back the winter, and it is leafless, also leaving a 'naked' stem. This is why it received the common name of 'leafless iris'. They re-grow in March, the next year.

It has a slender, stem, that can grow up to between 6.5 and 30 cm (3 and 12 in) tall. Very occasionally, they can reach up to between 50 and 70 cm (20 and 28 in) tall. They are sometimes the same height as the leaves. It is sometimes shorter than Iris germanica, with longer leaves than stems.

The stem has 1–2 branches (or pedicels), (rarely 3 branches). The branches appear from the base up to the middle of the stem. Occasionally, the rhizome has 2 flower stems, or it produces a branch at the level of the ground, so that two stems appear to arise from the rhizome.

The stem has 1–2 spathes (leaves of the flower bud), they are green, or stained with purple, or purple at the apex of the spathe. They are greenish at flowering time. They are narrow and rounded, ovate, oblong or oblong-lanceolate shaped. They can be between 3 and 6.5 cm (1 and 3 in) long. They sometimes have (scarious) membranous tip.

The stems (and the branches) hold between 3 and 5 flowers, between spring, and early summer, between April and May, in May, or between May and June. They sometimes have a secondary bloom in autumn, between August and September, or between September and October, but it is less vigorous than the spring display. Only if good conditions around. They are open for only a few days.

The fragrant, large, flowers are 4–7 cm (2–3 in) in diameter. They seem to stand above each other. They come in shades of bright purple, purple, violet, dark blue, blue-violet, dark violet, to dark purple.

In Moldova, there are forms of plants in bright reddish-purple colour.

It has a short pedicel, that is 0.5 cm long, and a cylindrical, green perianth tube, that is stained purple and 1.6 – 2.5 cm long.

Like other irises, it has 2 pairs of petals, 3 large sepals (outer petals), known as the 'falls' and 3 inner, smaller petals (or tepals), known as the 'standards'. The falls are wide, obovate often retuse (rounded), and 4–6.5 cm (2–3 in) long, and 2–3 cm (1–1 in) wide. The falls narrow to a pale, cuneate (wedge shaped) haft (section of petal near stem). They are also striped with white, or the hafts are striped.

In the centre of the petal is a whitish, or white tinged with blue, or pale blue beard. They are tipped with yellow at the back (of the beard), or orange tipped. The standards are oval, with an elliptical limb, and 4–6.5 cm (2–3 in) long, and 2.2–3 cm wide. They narrow to canaliculate (with a small channel or groove) brownish-marked haft, or short claw. The standards are slightly broader than the falls.

It has pale style branches, that are 0.6–1 cm long, with deltoid crests.

It has 1.5 cm long filaments, very pale violet, oblong and 1 cm long ovaries, blue edged anthers and white or bluish pollen.

After the iris has flowered, in August, it produces a cylindrical, blunt and triangular, or oblong, hexagonal seed capsule, that is 3–6.5 cm (1–3 in) long, and 1.3–2.3 cm wide, with 6 grooves. Inside the capsule, are obovate, ovoid, globose or pyriform (pear shaped) seeds, that are brown or dark reddish brown, rugose (wrinkled). They are 4.5–5.2 mm long and 2.9–3.3 mm wide.

The stems hold 1–5 terminal (top of stem) flowers, blooming between March and May or between May and June. It can often the second bloom time between August and September.

The flower bud leans slightly before flowering in Iris aphylla subsp. hungarica as compared to Iris aphylla, in which the stem is straight.

The large flowers, come in shades of purple, or dark purple, or violet-blue.

Like other irises, it has 2 pairs of petals, 3 large sepals (outer petals), known as the 'falls' and 3 inner, smaller petals (or tepals), known as the 'standards'. The falls are ovate and elongated, and 2–3 cm wide. In the centre of the petal, white beards with orange tops. The standards are elongated an ovoid, and 3 cm wide.

After the iris has flowered, it produces a capsule, that is triangular, capsule, which is 4–5 mm long and 3 mm wide. The capsule contains elongated ovoid seeds.

=== Biochemistry ===
In 2003, a study was carried out the genetic diversity of Iris aphylla in Poland. In 2003, a population and morphological study was carried out on Iris aphylla within Biebrza National Park, Poland. In 2006, the genetic diversity of 7 populations of Iris aphylla were studied. In 2008, a genetic and morphological study was carried out on Iris aphylla populations in Italy. Some populations (in Piemonte) were re-classified as Iris perrieri and plants labelled as Iris benacensis were not either Iris perrieri or Iris aphylla but a separate species. In 2008, the iris was studied to find the genetic diversity over a geographical range.

In 2010, a chromosomal and European distribution study was carried out on Iris aphylla. It found the iris had a tetraploid origin. In 2013, an in vitro micropropagation study was carried out on Iris aphylla. To improve the growth rate of new plants of the species. As most irises are diploid, having two sets of chromosomes, this can be used to identify hybrids and classification of groupings. But unusually, Iris aphylla is a tetraploid form with 48 somatic chromosomes, but it is also variable. Other chromosome counts have 2n=24, 40 and 48. It is normally published with a count of 2n=48. by Randolph in 1947, and by Hrouda & Kralik (in 2010).

=== Genetics ===
In 2010, a cytotype study was carried out on Iris aphylla, using karyotype and AFLP data analysis. It concluded that Iris aphylla subsp. hungarica was a separate species to Iris aphylla.

In 2014, a study was carried out on the foliage and rhizomes of the iris, it found several constituents and terpenoids (organic compounds), including phenylacetaldehyde, eugenol, and lauric acid.

As most irises are diploid, having two sets of chromosomes, this can be used to identify hybrids and classification of groupings. It has been counted twice, 2n=48 (as Iris aphylla subsp. hungarica) in 1983, by Murín A. & Májovský J., Karyological study of Slovakian flora IV. – Acta Fac. Rerum Nat. Univ. Comen., Bot. 30: 1–16. Also 2n=44 (as Iris hungarica Waldst. & Kit.) in 1990 by Zakharjeva, O. I., Numeri Chromosomatum Magnoliophytorum Florae URSS, Aceraceae—Menyanthaceae. Nauka, Leninopoli.

== Taxonomy ==
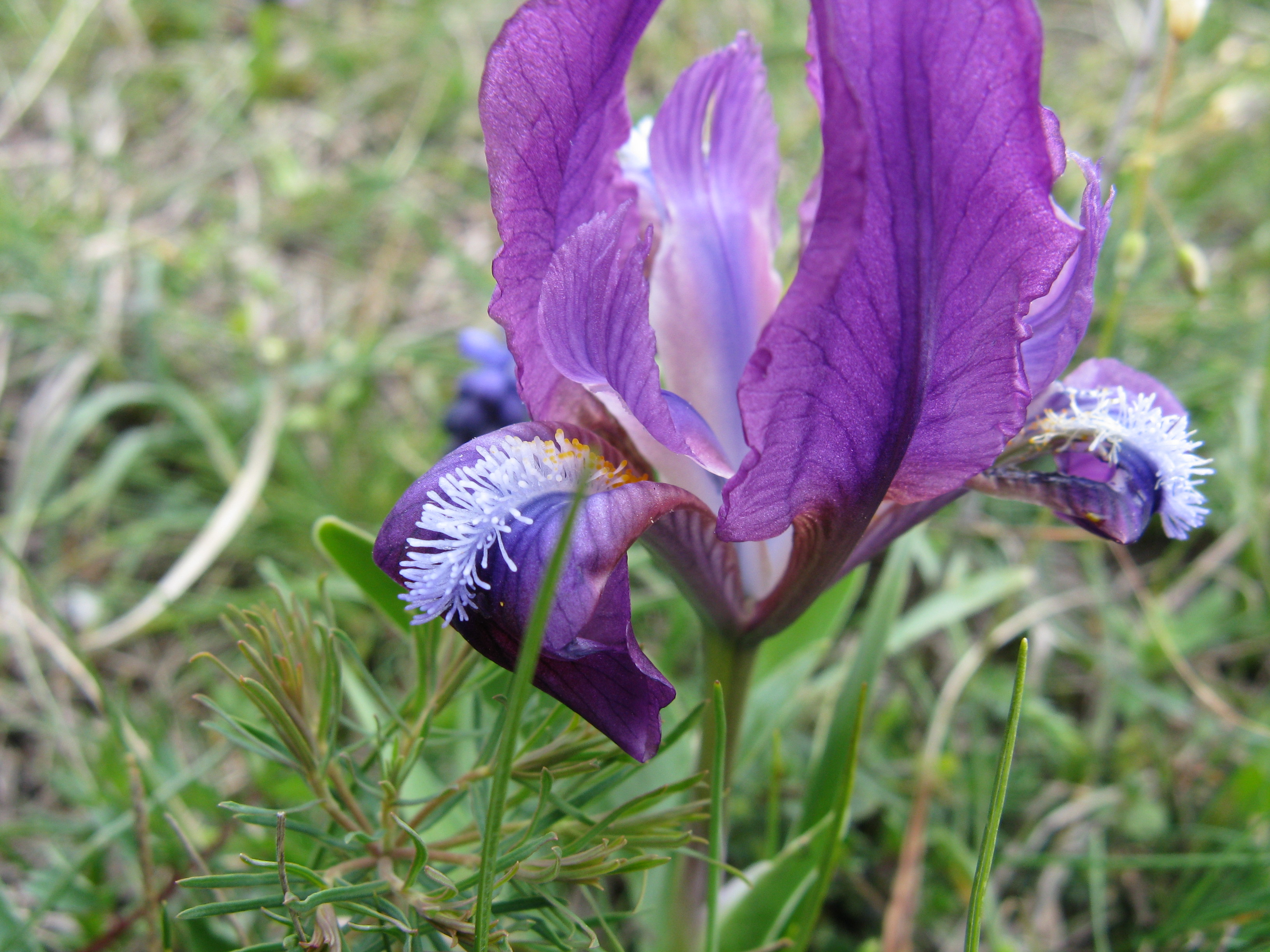
large image of the flower from Hungary

It is pronounced as (Iris) EYE-ris (aphylla) a-FIL-uh.

In German, it is known as 'nacktstängelige iris', or 'nacktstengelige schwertlilie'. In Swedish, as 'skomakariris'. In Poland, it is known as 'kosaciec bezlistny'. It is written in Russian Cyrillic script as Ирис Касатик безлистный.

It has several common names including, 'iris leafless', or 'leafless iris', or 'stool iris', (especially in Hungary,) or 'table iris'.

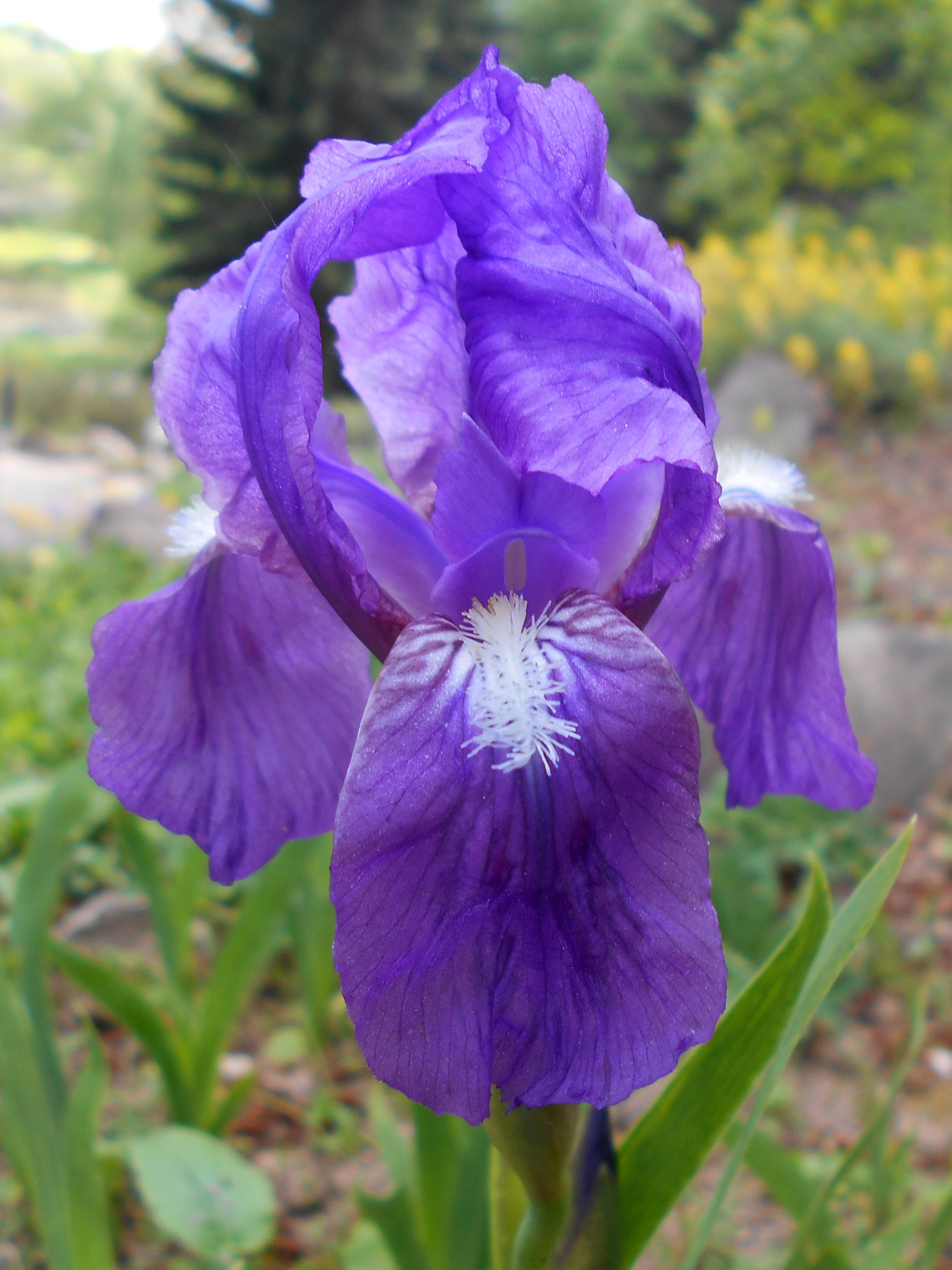
Iris aphylla subsp. hungarica from UMCS Botanical Garden in Lublin, Poland

It has the common names of Hungarian leafless iris, or Hungarian Iris, or Iris steppe.

The Latin subspecies specific epithet hungarica refers to Hungary, where the iris was originally found.

It was first published and described as Iris hungarica by Waldstein & Kitaibel in 'Descriptiones et icônes plantarum rariorum Hungáriáé'(Descr. Icon. Pl. Hung.) Vol.3 page 251 between 1806 and 1812. In 1909, Iris aphylla subsp. hungarica was published by Gustav Hegi in 'Ill Fl. Mitteleur' Vol.2 page 289. Both were then de-classified as a synonyms of Iris aphylla. Later, Iris aphylla subsp. hungarica was re-classified as a subspecies of Iris aphylla.

It has not been verified by United States Department of Agriculture and the Agricultural Research Service, as of 2 September 2015.

It has not been recognized as a subspecies by Plant list, as of 4 September 2015.

It is listed in the Encyclopedia of Life.

Iris aphylla subsp. hungarica is an accepted name by the RHS.

An older common name (especially in the UK), was 'naked stalked purple and white iris', or just 'naked stalked iris'.

The Latin specific epithet aphylla refers to the Greek word for 'without leaf', This is due to the fact that the iris does not have any leaves during the winter period. Hence, one of its synonyms includes 'Iris nudicaulis', (or nude stem).

It was first published and described by Carl Linnaeus in 'Species Plantarum' (Sp. Pl.) Vol.1 on page 38 on 1 May 1753.

The plant has many synonyms, including several subspecies which have been downgraded to synonyms as well.

It was verified by United States Department of Agriculture and the Agricultural Research Service on 4 April 2003, then updated on 1 December 2004.

It is listed in the Encyclopedia of Life.

Iris aphylla is an accepted name by the RHS and is listed in the 'RHS Plant Finder 2015'.

== Distribution and habitat ==
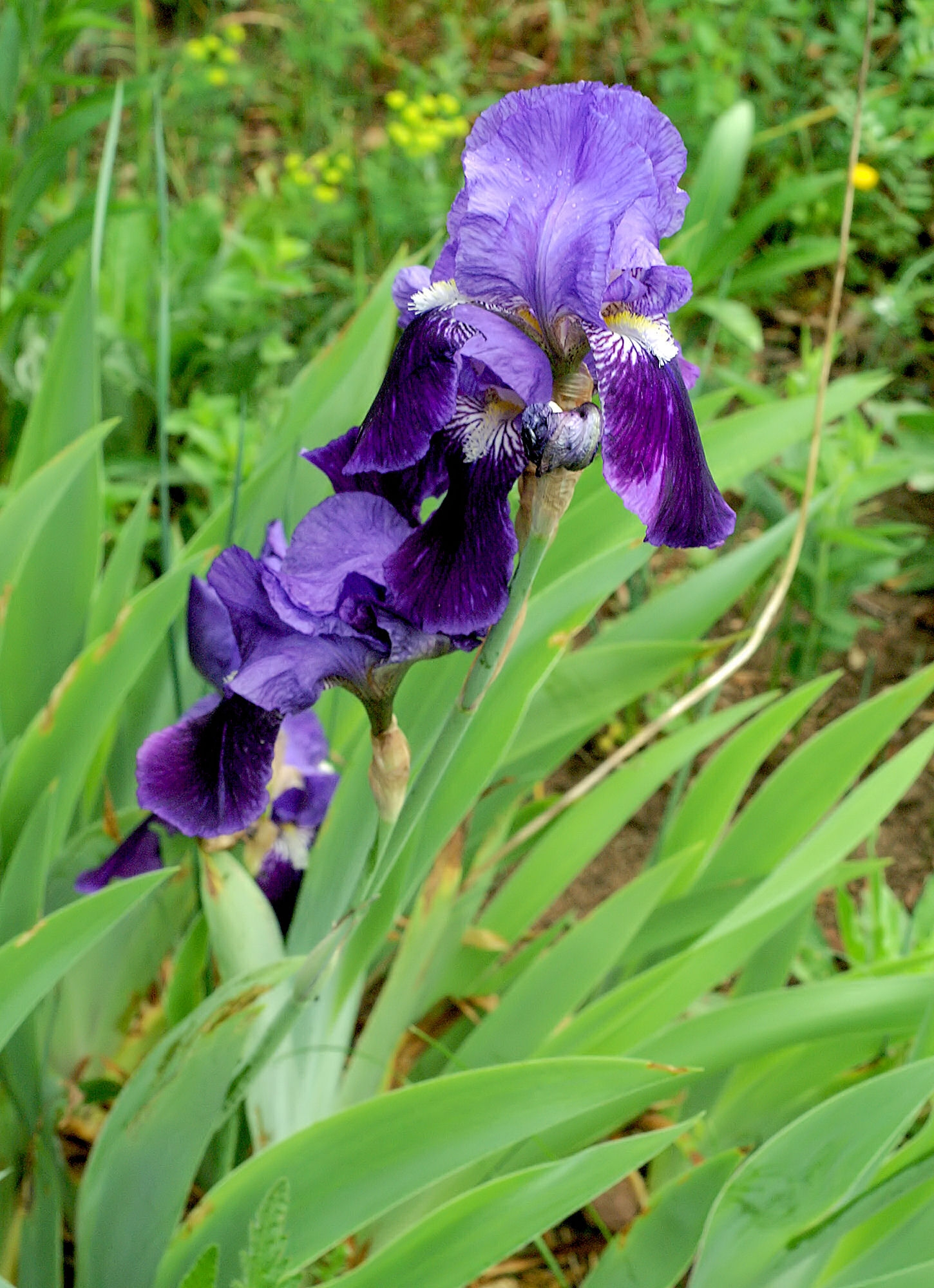

It is native to parts of Central and Eastern Europe, and temperate Asia,

=== Range ===
Within temperate Asia, it is found in the Caucasus, within Azerbaijan, and the Russian Federation, states of Ciscaucasia and Dagestan.

Within Europe, it is found in Czechoslovakia, (only in central Bohemia and Czech central,) Germany, Hungary, Poland, Belarus, Ukraine, Bulgaria, Albania, Former Yugoslavia, Italy, Romania (within the Transylvanian Basin and Szeklerland,) France, Turkey, Armenia, Georgia, and (according to one ref) in Great Britain and Ireland, but this may mean just naturalized.

Iris aphylla subsp. hungarica is found in the Carpathian Mountains, on the Pontic–Caspian steppe, and Pannonian Basin. Also along the foothills of the river Bodrog (in eastern Slovakia and north-eastern Hungary). Within the countries of Hungary, (within the Zemplén Mountains, near the village of Szendrőlád, and Nyírség,), Slovakia (or Slovak Republic), Ukraine (within the Cherkassy region,), Moldova, Romania, (including Transylvania,) and Italy. It is not found in the Czech Republic. It is listed in a checklist of Vascular Flora in Italy.

=== Habitat ===
It is found on the Alps, growing in a variety of habitats. It can grow in grasslands and meadows, beside limestone and sandstone rocks of hillsides, in forest glades, in scrub land or thickets, and beside roadsides and paths.

It is found between lowlands to uplands (at sub-alpine levels).

Within Czech Republic, Germany and Poland, it is found on sandstone, in beech forests (mixture of Luzulo-Fagetum) and pine-oak forests (with Vaccinio-Quercetum). In Hungary, it is found in acacia forests.

Iris aphylla subsp. hungarica grows on the steppe grasslands and meadows, (including sandy and semi-dry steppes,), in rocky meadows, (on andesite, limestone and basalt rocks,), and (in Moldova) at the edge of the forest clearings. They can be found at an altitude of up to 1,500 m (4,900 ft)above sea level.

== Conservation ==
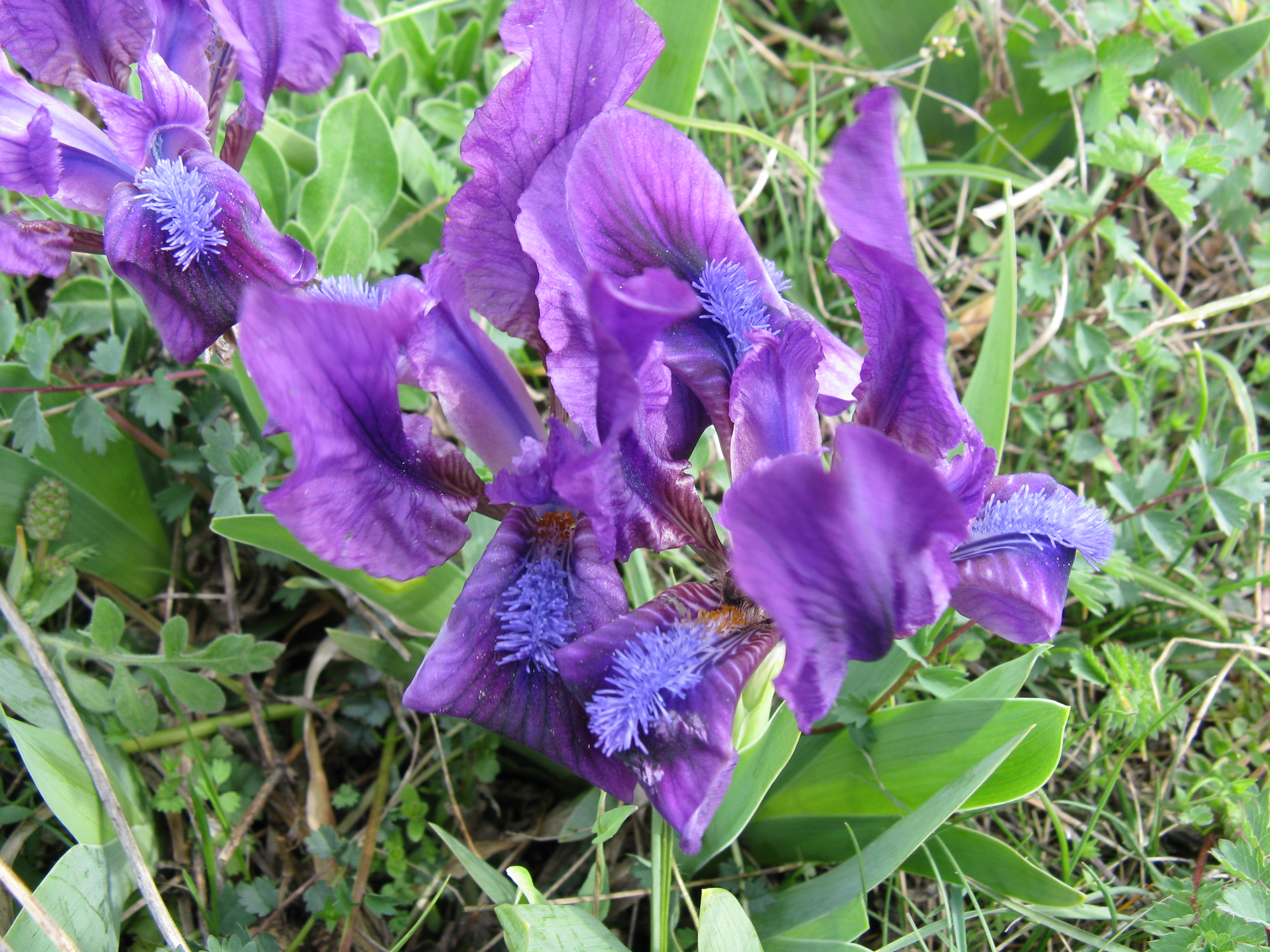

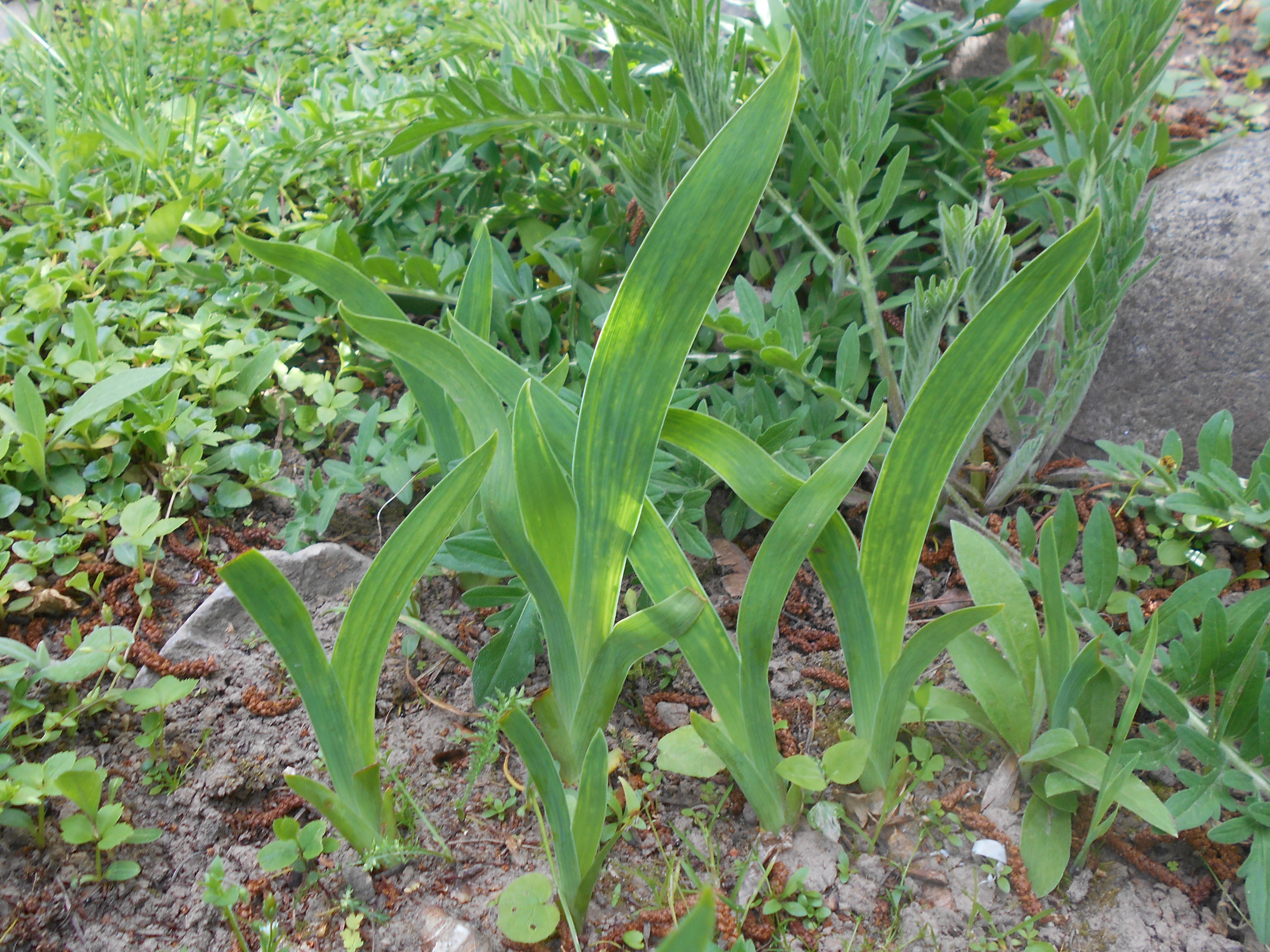
Leaves of Iris aphylla subsp. hungarica

Iris aphylla is considered rare and endangered in most countries, it is listed on many red data books and plant lists in Europe, from 1993 to 2001. It is listed in the Red Book of Russia as 'vulnerable'. It is threatened due to habitat loss. From infrastructure development, forestry practices (including rejuvenation of forests with spruce). Also loss by invading dominant species such as robinia and pinus species.

It was listed on the European Red List of Vascular Plants as Data Deficient (DD) in 2011. It is listed as 'Vulnerable' on Red List of vascular plants of the Carpathian part of Slovakia in 2014. It is listed in the Berne Convention (1982), Habitats Directive 92/43/EEC, and the Romanian Government Emergency Ordinance no 236/2000, Annex 3b.

In Poland, it was put into statutory protection since 1946, but was still listed as an endangered species in 2003. It is listed as one of 45 species that are listed under the 'Red Data List of Endangered Vascular Plants' of Poland.

In Slovenia, it has also been listed under the laws for nature protection.

In Slovakia, it is classed as 'critically endangered' CR, and it is protected within Slovak Paradise National Park, alongside other at risk species including buxbaumia viridis (a type of moss), Cypripedium calceolus (Lady's Slipper Orchid), Ligularia sibirica, Pulsatilla subslavica, Pulsatilla slavica (Slovak pasque flower) and Adenophora lilifolia. It is also protected within National nature reserve in Dreveník, near Žehra, approximately 60 species are classified as endangered including (Pulsatilla slavica G. Reuss.), Alpine aster (Aster alpinus L.), Carpathian harebell (Campanula carpatica Jacq.), Pontic dragonhead (Dracocephalum austriacum L.), European columbine (Aquilegia vulgaris L.), Snowdrop windflower (Anemone sylvestris L.), Manchurian monk's-hood (Aconitum variegatum L.), Turk's cap lily (Lilium martagon L.), St. Lucie cherry (Cerasus mahaleb (L.) Mill.), Yellow Monkshood (Aconitum anthora L.), Bladdernut (Staphylea pinnata L.) and Edelweiss (Leontopodium alpinum Cass.).

In Serbia, it has become extinct.

In Russia, it is protected in the nature reserves of Moscow, Rostov and Saratov regions. It is also listed as being found in Kursk reserve since 1968.

In Czechoslovakia, it is found in the Bohemian Paradise reserve, with other endangered species including.

In Romania, it is classed as 'Vulnerable', and is including on a list of protected plants. Since 2002 and 2007, there were 5 confirmed locations in Romania. It is also found within the Bicaz Gorges Haghimas National Park. It is found in Târnava Mare River reserve, which has been protected due to overgrazing and scrub loss by aggressive trees and shrubs including black locust (Robinia pseudacacia). Due to its endangered status, rapid propagation (via in-vitro culture) has been developed. So that re-population of sub-alpine areas could take place.

In the Cherkasy region of Ukraine, it is listed in the Red Book as rare and endangered species with Stipa capillata L.. It is also found within the meadows of Sofiyivsky Park.

In Hungary, it is protected by law.

== Cultivation ==
It has a natural resistance to a cold winter, and is hardy, to between USDA Zone 3 and Zone 8. Including Zone 5. It has also been tested for hardiness in Russia, within the botanical gardens of Moscow, Stavropol, Chita and St Petersburg.

It is not found in southern climates, as it does not like long hot and humid spells.

It prefers to grow in well-drained soils, but can tolerate loamy and heavy soils. It can also tolerate soils with a ph level of between 6.1 and 6.5 (mildly acidic) to 7.6 to 7.8 (mildly alkaline), and it can tolerate dry soils, but prefers average moisture levels.

It prefers positions in full sun, and it can be grow in a mixed garden border, or rock garden. It is best planted between August and September, to produce flowers next year.

It is susceptible to viruses, and slugs. Mononychus punctumalbum (Iris Weevil) can also attack the plant's seeds. Aphid Dysaphis tulipae can also be found on the plant.

It is only found in specialised nurseries, botanical gardens, and specimens can be found in 'The Bolestraszyce Arboretum', near Przemyśl in Poland.

=== Propagation ===
It can be propagated by division, or by seed growing. Seeds are best grown by collecting dry, mature seed capsules, and sowing the seeds.

=== Hybrids and cultivars ===
It is thought that Iris germanica could be a hybrid form of Iris aphylla and Iris variegata.

It is one of the origin species (with Iris pumila), for modern hybrids in the 'Border Bearded Irises' or 'Tall Bearded Irises' varieties, due to its hardiness, it also has narrow foliage which is normally luxuriant. This creates grassy, dense clumps of plants. In the early 1990s, it was used in breeding programmes, (with Iris balkana and Iris reichenbachii,) including the breeding of 'Miniature Tall Bearded irises'. Iris hybridisers also used Iris aphylla due to its 'tetraploid' status.

The iris is easy to hybridize with other species of bearded iris. There are many natural hybrids, especially in Romania.

Iris aphylla has numerous cultivars, including; 'Ahlburg', 'Aphylla Gigantea', 'Aphylla Hungary', 'Aphylla Osiris', 'Aphylla Polonica', 'Aphylla Slovakia, 'Aphylla Wine-Red', 'Austrian Violet', 'Babadagica', 'Benacensis', 'Biflora', 'Bifurcata', 'Bisflorens', 'Black Forest', 'Bohemica', 'Bright Water', 'Bujoreanui', 'Chamaeiris Campbelli', 'Chloris', 'Coelstis', 'Dacia', 'Dacica', 'Fieberi', 'Furcata', 'Hungarica Minor', 'Ladies Of Peeling', 'Melzeri', 'Minnow', 'Monantha', 'Nudicaulis', 'Nudicaulis Major', 'Nudicaulis Purpuerea', 'Ostry White', 'Prodan', 'Slick', 'Thisbe', 'Thisbe's Child', 'Transylvania Native', 'Wee Charmer', 'Werckmeister' and 'Yellow Conundrum'.

=== Subspecies ===
Several variants or hybrids have been described as subspecies, some have been downgraded to synonyms. Including Iris aphylla subsp. dacica (Beldie) Soó, Iris aphylla subsp. fieberi (Seidl) Dostál, Iris aphylla f. major (Zapal.) Soó, Iris aphylla subsp. nudicaulis (Lam.) O.Schwarz and Iris aphylla var. polonica Blocki ex Asch. & Graebn.

Only Iris aphylla subs. hungarica is recognized by most authorities as a species.

But Iris aphylla subsp. babadagica (Rzazade & Golneva) and Iris aphylla subsp. furcata (Bieb.)Bieb, are still questionable.

== Toxicity ==
Like many other irises, most parts of the plant are poisonous (rhizome and leaves), if mistakenly ingested can cause stomach pains and vomiting. Also handling the plant may cause a skin irritation or an allergic reaction.

== Culture ==
On 7 February 1967, a stamp was issued in Hungary that shows Iris hungarica. In Hungary, Iris aphylla appears on the back of the 5 ft coin issued on 29 March 1993 and the 20 ft coin on 6 January 2012.

== Sources ==
- Aldén, B., S. Ryman & M. Hjertson. 2009. Våra kulturväxters namn – ursprung och användning. Formas, Stockholm (Handbook on Swedish cultivated and utility plants, their names and origin).
- Czerepanov, S. K. 1995. Vascular plants of Russia and adjacent states (the former USSR).
- Davis, P. H., ed. 1965–1988. Flora of Turkey and the east Aegean islands.
- Komarov, V. L. et al., eds. 1934–1964. Flora SSSR.
- Mathew, B. 1981. The Iris. 22–23.
- Tutin, T. G. et al., eds. 1964–1980. Flora europaea.
- Gregory Jones QC (Editor), The Habitats Directive: A Developer's Obstacle Course?
