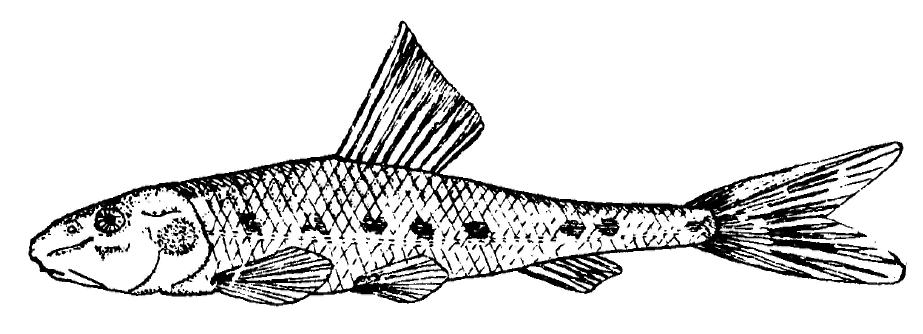

Conservation status
- Vulnerable (IUCN 3.1)

Scientific classification
- Kingdom: Animalia
- Phylum: Chordata
- Class: Actinopterygii
- Order: Cypriniformes
- Suborder: Cyprinoidei
- Family: Gobionidae
- Genus: Romanogobio
- Species: R. antipai

Binomial name
- Romanogobio antipai Bănărescu, 1953

= Danube delta gudgeon =

Species of fish

The Danube delta gudgeon (Romanogobio antipai) is a species of freshwater ray-finned fish belonging to the family Gobionidae, the gudgeons. This fish is endemic to the lower Danube in Bulgaria, Romania and Ukraine. It was last recorded in the 1960s, with many studies conducted in its home range, all failing to find the species, until in 2016 a specimen was collected from the Bulgarian sector of the Danube.

It is named in memory of Romanian zoologist Grigore Antipa (1867–1944), who collected the type specimen.
