= Kura gudgeon =

Scientific classification
- Kingdom: Animalia
- Phylum: Chordata
- Class: Actinopterygii
- Order: Cypriniformes
- Suborder: Cyprinoidei
- Family: Gobionidae
- Genus: Romanogobio
- Species: R. persus

Binomial name
- Romanogobio persus (Günther, 1899)

Synonyms
- Gobio persa Günther, 1899; Gobio persus Günther, 1899

Species of fish

The Kura gudgeon (Romanogobio persus) is a species of freshwater ray-finned fish belonging to the family Gobionidae, the gudgeons. This species is found in the Kura and Aras basins in Europe and Asia.

This species reaches a length of 10.5 cm (4.1 in).
