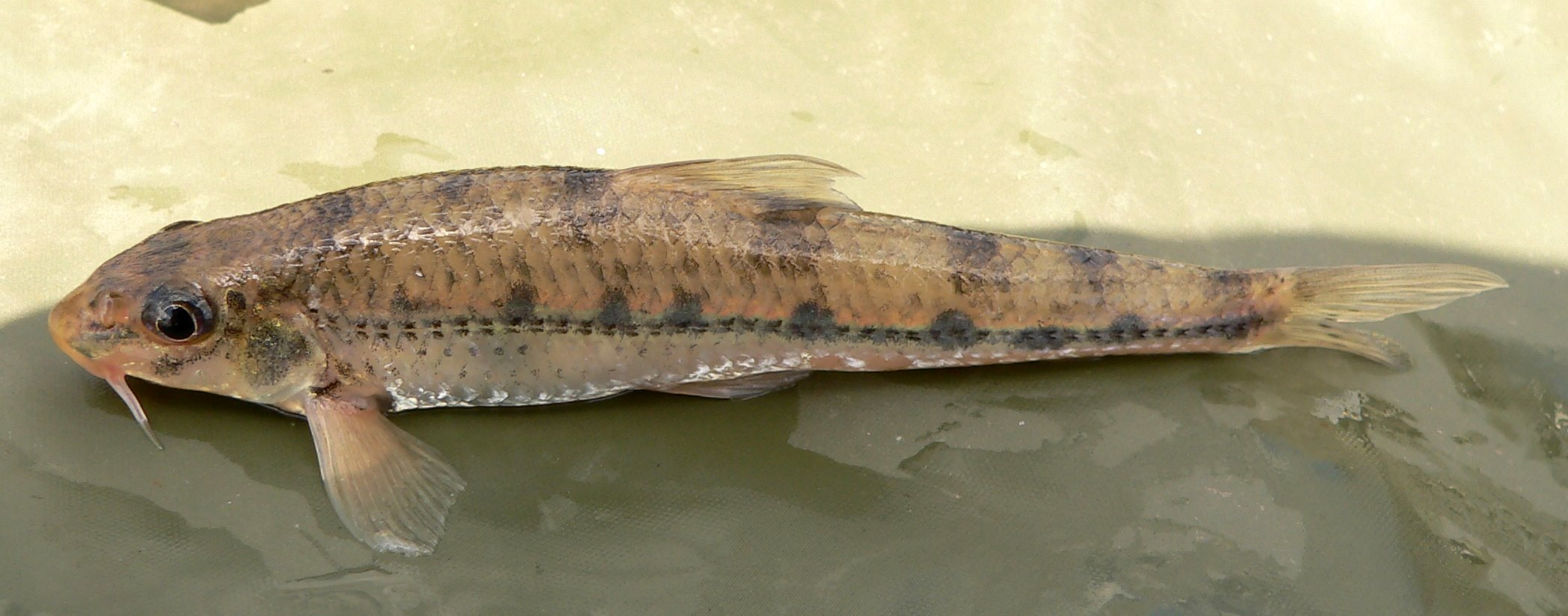

Conservation status
- Least Concern (IUCN 3.1)

Scientific classification
- Kingdom: Animalia
- Phylum: Chordata
- Class: Actinopterygii
- Order: Cypriniformes
- Family: Gobionidae
- Genus: Romanogobio
- Species: R. belingi

Binomial name
- Romanogobio belingi (Slastenenko, 1934)

Synonyms
- Gobio belingi Slastenenko, 1934

= Northern whitefin gudgeon =

Species of fish

The northern whitefin gudgeon (Romanogobio belingi) is a species of freshwater ray-finned fish belonging to the family Gobionidae, the gudgeons. It is distributed in the northern Black Sea basin (Dniester, Southern Bug, and Dnieper riverine systems), and southern Baltic Sea basin (Oder, Vistula), southern North Sea basin (Elbe, Rhine). Also, reports from lakes Ilmen and Ladoga and its basins have been made, which are questionable. Their maximal length is 11.5 cm, with a maximal reported age of 5 years.

It is named in honor of Demeter (Dimitry) E. Beling, director of the Dnieper Biological Station, and an authority on Ukrainian fishes frequently cited in Slastenenko's paper.
