= North Caucasian longbarbel gudgeon =

Conservation status
- Least Concern (IUCN 3.1)

Scientific classification
- Kingdom: Animalia
- Phylum: Chordata
- Class: Actinopterygii
- Order: Cypriniformes
- Suborder: Cyprinoidei
- Family: Gobionidae
- Genus: Romanogobio
- Species: R. ciscaucasicus

Binomial name
- Romanogobio ciscaucasicus (Berg, 1932)

Species of fish

The North Caucasian longbarbel gudgeon (Romanogobio ciscaucasicus) is a species of freshwater ray-finned fish belonging to the family Gobionidae, the gudgeons. This fish is found in the Western Caspian basin, from the Kuma drainages in Russia to the Yalaminskie drainages in Azerbaijan.
