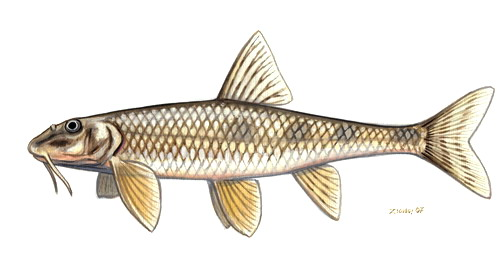

Conservation status
- Least Concern (IUCN 3.1)

Scientific classification
- Kingdom: Animalia
- Phylum: Chordata
- Class: Actinopterygii
- Order: Cypriniformes
- Suborder: Cyprinoidei
- Family: Gobionidae
- Genus: Romanogobio
- Species: R. uranoscopus

Binomial name
- Romanogobio uranoscopus (Agassiz, 1828)

Synonyms
- Gobio uranoscopus (Agassiz, 1828); Gobio frici Vladykov, 1925; Gobio uranoscopus (Agassiz, 1828); Gobio uranoscopus frici Vladykov, 1925; Gobio uranoscopus uranoscopus (Agassiz, 1828)

= Romanogobio uranoscopus =

Species of fish

Romanogobio uranoscopus, also known as the Danubian longbarbel gudgeon, Danubian gudgeon, Danube gudgeon or the steingressling, is a species of freshwater ray-finned fish belonging to the family Gobionidae, the gudgeons. It can be found in Austria, Bulgaria, Croatia, Czech Republic, Germany, Hungary, Italy, Romania, Serbia and Montenegro, Slovakia, Slovenia and Ukraine.

== Description ==
The Danube gudgeon grows to a maximum length of 15 centimetres (5.9 in), though a more normal size is 10 to 12 centimetres (3.9 to 4.7 in). It has a distinctive pair of barbels at the corner of the mouth which are long enough to extend back to beyond the eyes. These are tactile organs and are used to search through sediment for edible items. There are no scales on the throat and this helps distinguish it from its close relative, Kessler's gudgeon (Romanogobio kessleri). The dorsal fin has seven branched rays and the general colour is silver with a few dark spots. There is a thin blue streak that runs along the lateral line.

== Distribution ==
The Danube gudgeon occurs in the rapid running tributaries of the River Danube but not in the main river except for its upper stretches. It favours sand and gravel bottoms.

== Biology ==
Spawning takes place between May and September in shallow areas with stone or gravel bottoms. The fish rise to the surface in open water where the current is flowing at about 1 metre per second (3.3 ft/s). The eggs and milt are released and the fertilised eggs sink to the bottom and adhere there. The juveniles are diurnal but the adults are solitary and nocturnal. Both eat invertebrates of different kinds including earthworms, insect larvae and crustaceans.

== Status ==
The IUCN Red List of Threatened Species lists the Danube gudgeon as being of "Least Concern". This is because the species is abundant and widespread throughout the fast flowing rivers of the Danube basin. However, it is sensitive to organic pollution, and sedimentation may have occurred because of the building of damns. It is likely to react adversely to human disturbance to its habitat. Although its populations appear to be declining slowly, this is gradual and does not warrant a higher level categorization.
