= Romanogobio johntreadwelli =

Scientific classification
- Kingdom: Animalia
- Phylum: Chordata
- Class: Actinopterygii
- Order: Cypriniformes
- Suborder: Cyprinoidei
- Family: Gobionidae
- Genus: Romanogobio
- Species: R. johntreadwelli

Binomial name
- Romanogobio johntreadwelli Bănărescu & Nalbant, 1973

Synonyms
- Gobio johntreadwelli Bănărescu & Nalbant, 1973

Species of fish

Romanogobio johntreadwelli is a species of freshwater ray-finned fish belonging to the family Gobionidae, the gudgeons. This fish is endemic to China.

It is named in honor of John Treadwell Nichols (1883–1958), curator of fishes at the American Museum of Natural History, who first studied specimens on which this new species is based.
