= Romanogobio banarescui =

Conservation status
- Near Threatened (IUCN 3.1)

Scientific classification
- Kingdom: Animalia
- Phylum: Chordata
- Class: Actinopterygii
- Order: Cypriniformes
- Suborder: Cyprinoidei
- Family: Gobionidae
- Genus: Romanogobio
- Species: R. banarescui

Binomial name
- Romanogobio banarescui (Dimovski & Grupche, 1974)

Synonyms
- Gobio banarescui Dimovski & Grupche, 1974

Species of fish

Romanogobio banarescui, the Vardar sand gudgeon, is a species of freshwater ray-finned fish belonging to the family Gobionidae, the gudgeons. This species is mainly found in the Vardar drainage system in Kosovo, North Macedonia and Greece, as well as the Haliacmon River in Greece and it may also occur in the Loudias in Greece.
