= Grigore Antipa =

Romanian zoologist

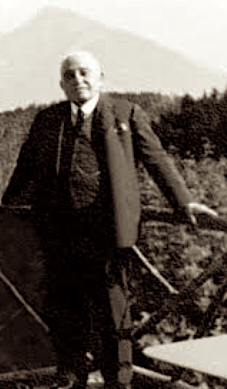
- Born: 27 November 1867; Botoșani, United Principalities of Moldavia and Wallachia
- Died: 9 March 1944 (aged 76); Bucharest, Kingdom of Romania
- Known for: Founder of the Romanian School of Hydrobiology and Ichthyology Creator of the Bioceanographic Institute in Constanța (1932) Director of the National Museum of Natural History (1892–1944)

Grigore Antipa (Romanian pronunciation: [ɡriˈɡore anˈtipa]; 27 November 1867 in Botoșani – 9 March 1944 in Bucharest) was a Romanian naturalist, zoologist, ichthyologist, ecologist, oceanologist, and a Darwinist biologist who studied the fauna of the Danube Delta and the Black Sea. Between 1892 and 1944 he was the director of the Bucharest Natural History Museum, which now bears his name. He is also considered to be the first person to modernize the diorama by emphasizing the three-dimensional aspect and first to use dioramas in a museum setting. He is the scientist who reorganized the Grigore Antipa National Museum of Natural History in the new building that today bears his name, designed by the architect Grigore Cerchez, built in 1906 and inaugurated by Carol I of Romania in 1908. He was elected as member of the Romanian Academy in 1910 and was also a member of several foreign academies. Grigore Antipa founded a school of hydrobiology and ichthyology in Romania.

== Biography ==
Grigore Antipa spent his childhood in Botoșani, in a neighborhood inhabited by many Armenians and Jews, who taught him in foreign languages. His father was a lawyer, but he lost his parents early and was raised by his aunts in a modest environment. Thanks to his older brother, Nicolae, who was a parasitologist, he obtained a royal scholarship and studied at Jena (Germany), with the famous naturalist Ernst Haeckel (1834–1919), the inventor of ecology. He submitted his dissertation Die Lucernariden der Bremer Expedition nach Ostspitzbergen im Jahre 1889. Nebst Anh. üb. rudimentäre Tentakel bei Lucernariden in 1891 and obtained his Dr. phil..

He subsequently continued his scientific research in France and Italy. A study on the evolution of the thymus in fish dates from this period.

== Career ==
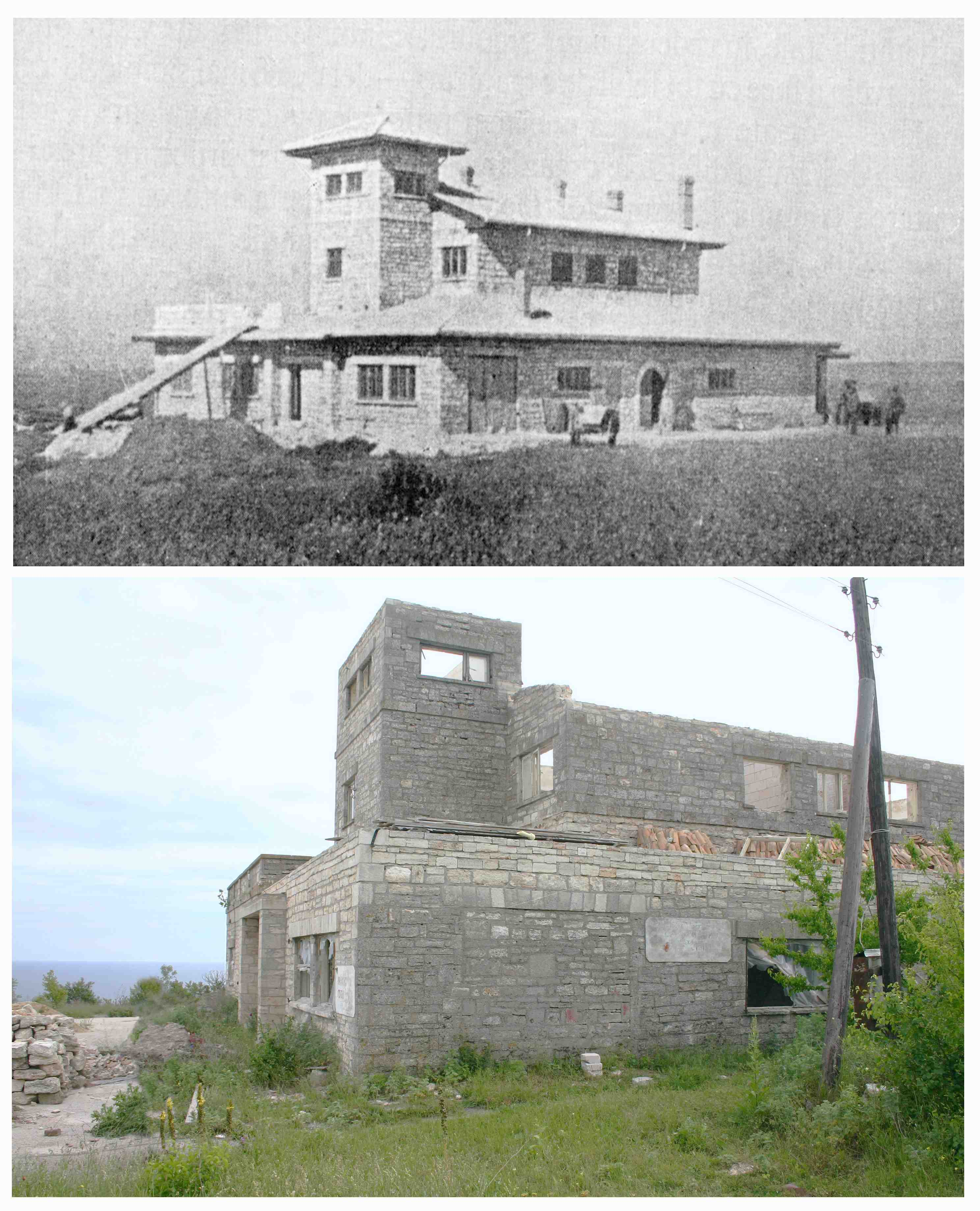
Caliacra marine biology station of the Bio-Oceanographic Institute of Constanța in 1937 and in 2007.

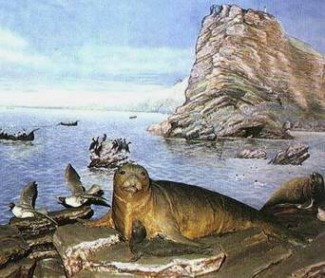
Diorama made by Grigore Antipa, representing the extinct Black Sea monk seals (Monachus monachus albiventer).

Near the island of Capri (Italy), Antipa discovered a new species of fixed jellyfish, Capria sturdzii. He devoted himself to the study of the Danube and the Black Sea.

Antipa founded in 1932 the Biooceanographic Institute of Constanța, with its two reservations and research stations, located in Agigea (founded by Ioan Borcea) and at Cape Caliacra.

Grigore Antipa, with the support of kings Carol I and Ferdinand, devised a plan for the rational exploitation of fisheries in the Danube meadow and delta, and in the estuaries (the Bessarabian and Dobrogean estuaries north and south of the Danube mouths). The ecological policy of optimizing natural phenomena, called by Grigore Antipa geonomy was replaced by one to counteract them, which logically led to the acceleration of canal currents, eutrophication of stagnant areas, and the collapse of fish productivity (partially offset today through fish farming).

He was director of the Grigore Antipa National Museum of Natural History (1892–1944). His paper Principes et moyens pour la réorganisation des musées d'histoire naturelle was published in 1934. Starting from the reorganization of the Bucharest museum, in 1907 biological dioramas were used for the first time. The first dioramas illustrated the Carpathian Mountains, the Bărăgan Plain, and the Danube Delta. The Museum of Natural History also has dioramas depicting the fauna of the tundra, prairie, savannah or Sahara desert regions. Several museums worldwide asked for his assistance as a consultant as a result of this work. Grigore Antipa was a member of the Romanian Academy

== Works ==
- On the need to introduce a systematic fish farming in Romanian waters (1892)
- Studies on fisheries in Romania (1895)
- Draft Law on Fisheries (1896)
- The Fischerei-Verlaltnisse Rumaniens (1899)
- Ichthyological fauna of Romania (1909)
- Fisheries and the flood region of the Danube in the national and world economy (1932)
- Iconography of Black Sea Sturgeons and Clupeids (1934)
- The Black Sea and its ichthyology (1941)

== In memoriam ==
The National Museum of Natural History in Bucharest is named after the scientist, as well as the National Institute for Marine Research and Development "Grigore Antipa" in Constanța.

One of the annual awards given by the Romanian Academy is named after Grigore Antipa.

Also, the marine research ship "Grigore Antipa", which belongs to the Diving Center in Constanța, bears his name.

The Danube delta gudgeon, Romanogobio antipai is named after him as he collected the type specimen.

=== Notaphilia and numismatics ===
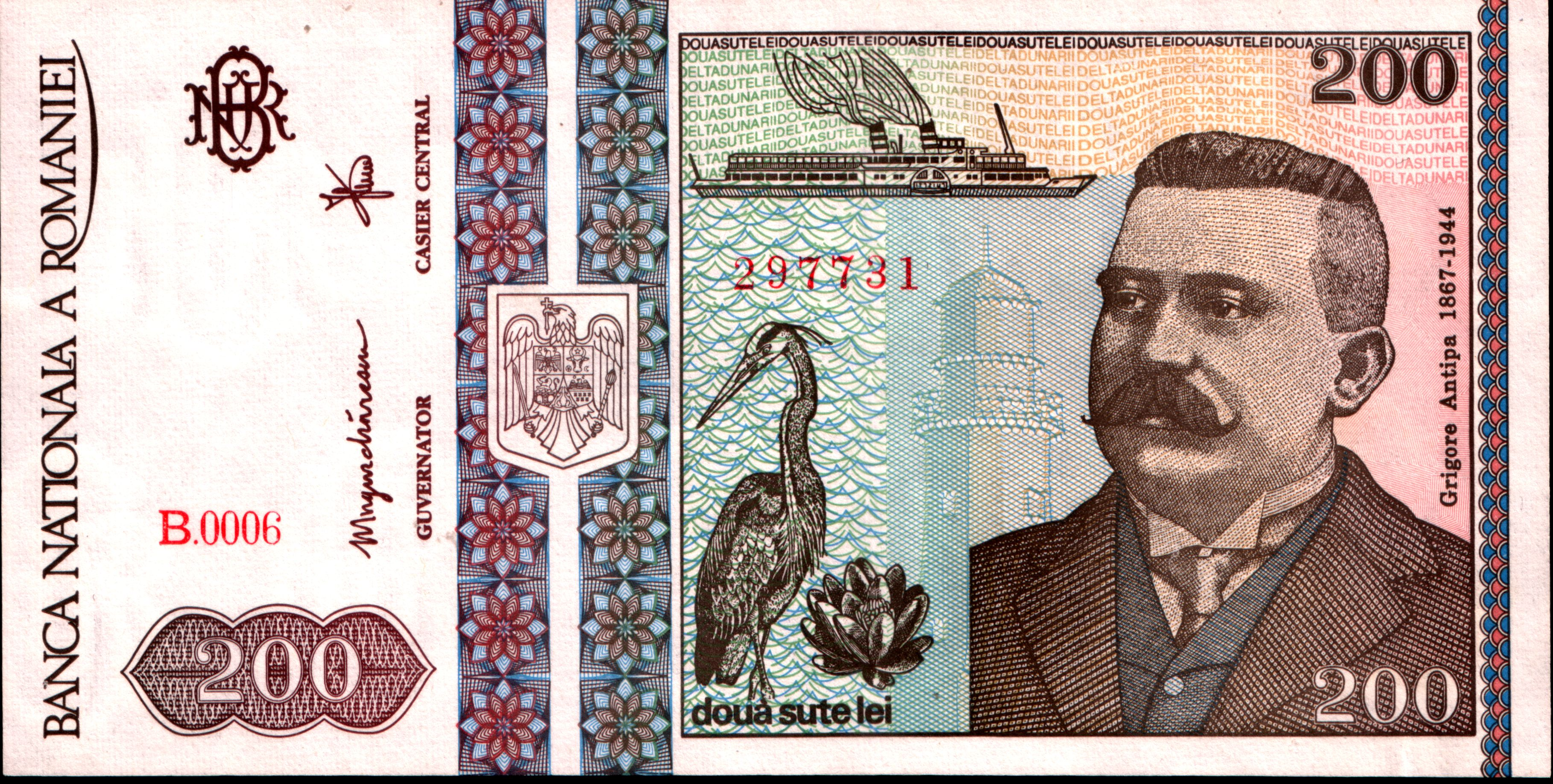
A banknote of 1992 with Grigore Antipa

In 1992, the National Bank of Romania issued a circulation banknote, with a face value of 200 lei, with the portrait of Grigore Antipa on the obverse.

On 4 December 2017, the National Bank of Romania put into circulation a gold commemorative coin, with a face value of 100 lei, on the occasion of the 150th anniversary of the birth of Antipa. The coin has a fineness of 900 (90% pure gold), weighs 6.452 g (0.2276 oz), has a diameter of 21 mm (0.83 in), and has a serrated edge; it has been issued in 250 copies, all of proof quality.
