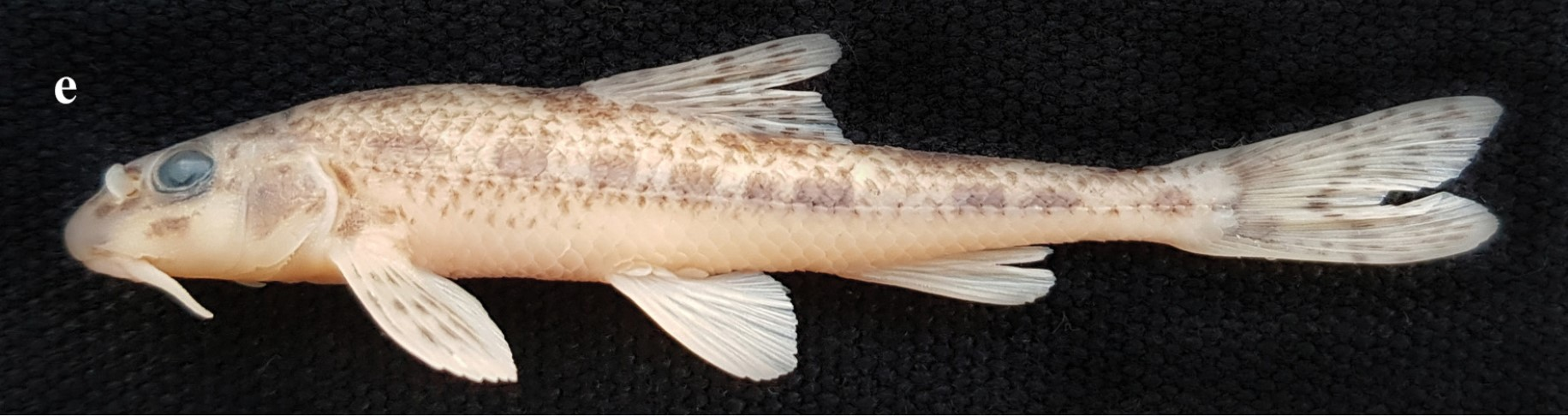

Conservation status
- Least Concern (IUCN 3.1)

Scientific classification
- Kingdom: Animalia
- Phylum: Chordata
- Class: Actinopterygii
- Order: Cypriniformes
- Suborder: Cyprinoidei
- Family: Gobionidae
- Genus: Romanogobio
- Species: R. macropterus

Binomial name
- Romanogobio macropterus (Kamensky, 1901)

Synonyms
- Gobio macropterus Kamensky, 1901

= South Caucasian gudgeon =

Species of fish

The South Caucasian gudgeon (Romanogobio macropterus) is a species of freshwater ray-finned fish belonging to the family Gobionidae, the gudgeons. This fish is found in the Kura and Aras drainages flowing to the southwest Caspian Sea from headwaters in Turkey down to lower reaches in Azerbaijan and Iran.

This species reaches a length of 5.0 cm (2.0 in).

== Etymology ==
The fish's name means large finned.
