= Romanogobio elimeius =

Conservation status
- Least Concern (IUCN 3.1)

Scientific classification
- Kingdom: Animalia
- Phylum: Chordata
- Class: Actinopterygii
- Order: Cypriniformes
- Suborder: Cyprinoidei
- Family: Gobionidae
- Genus: Romanogobio
- Species: R. elimeius

Binomial name
- Romanogobio elimeius (Kattoulas, Stephanidis & Economidis, 1973)

Synonyms
- Gobio elimeius Kattoulas, Stephanidis & Economidis, 1973

Species of fish

Romanogobio elimeius, the Greek stone gudgeon, is a species of freshwater ray-finned fish belonging to the family Gobionidae, the gudgeons. It is found in Greece and North Macedonia. Its natural habitat is rivers. It is threatened by habitat loss.
