= Grigore Antipa National Museum of Natural History =

Museum in Bucharest, Romania

National Museum of Natural History "Grigore Antipa"
- Muzeul Național de Istorie Naturală „Grigore Antipa”
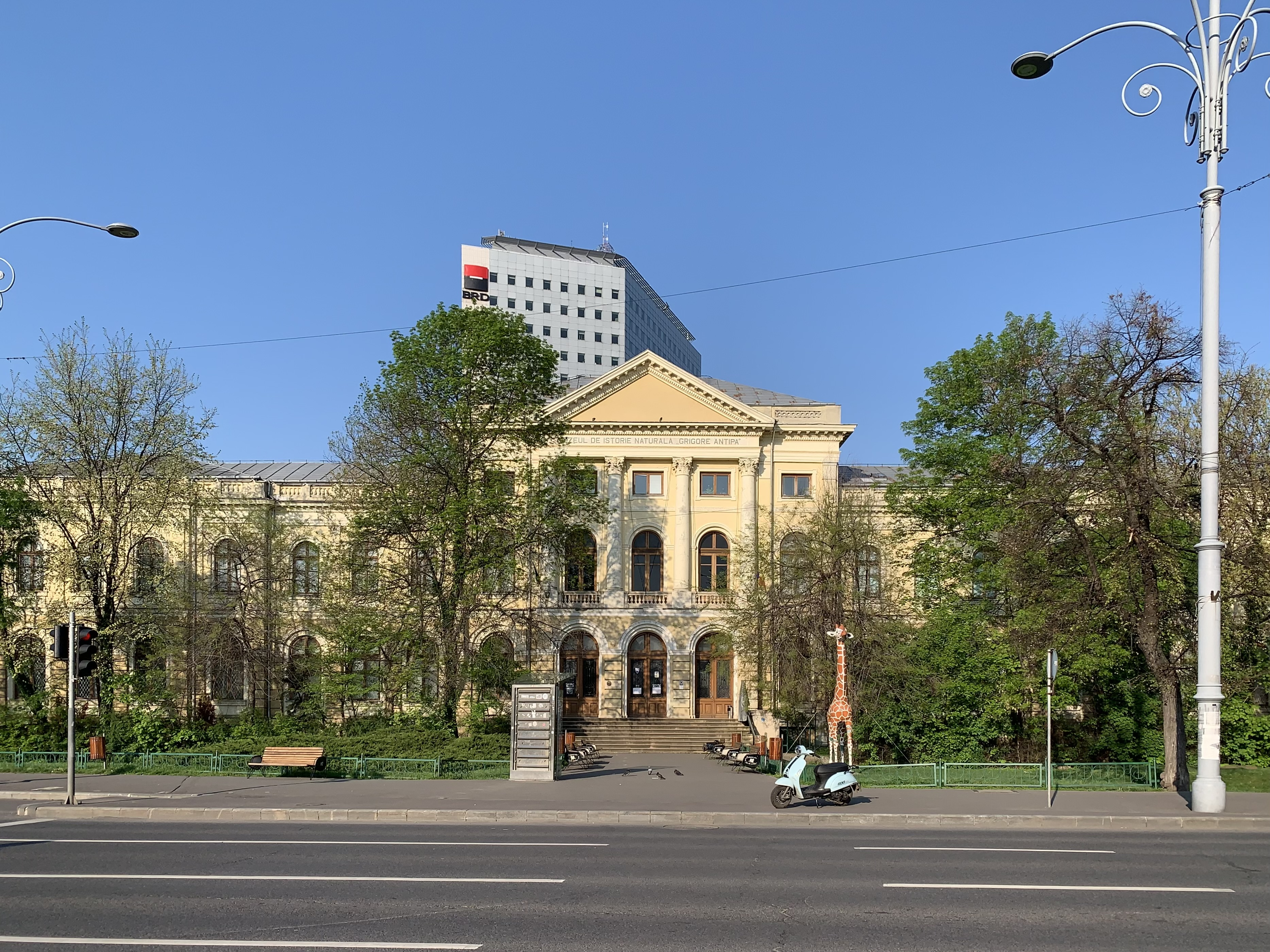
- National Museum of Natural History "Grigore Antipa" front facade in 2023
- Established: 1834
- Location: Şoseaua Pavel D. Kiseleff, Bucharest, Romania
- Coordinates: 44.4531°N 26.0846°E
- Type: Natural history museum
- Website: www.antipa.ro

The Grigore Antipa National Museum of Natural History (Romanian: Muzeul Național de Istorie Naturală „Grigore Antipa”) is a natural history museum, located in Bucharest, Romania. It was originally established as the National Museum of Natural History on 3 November 1834. It was renamed in 1933 after Grigore Antipa, who administered the museum for 51 years. He is the scientist who reorganized the museum in the new building, designed by the architect Grigore Cerchez and inaugurated by Carol I of Romania in 1908. It was reopened in 2011 after a $14 million renovation. The museum's collection consists of over 2 million specimens. It is regarded as one of the most prestigious and well organized natural history museums in the world.

== Gallery ==
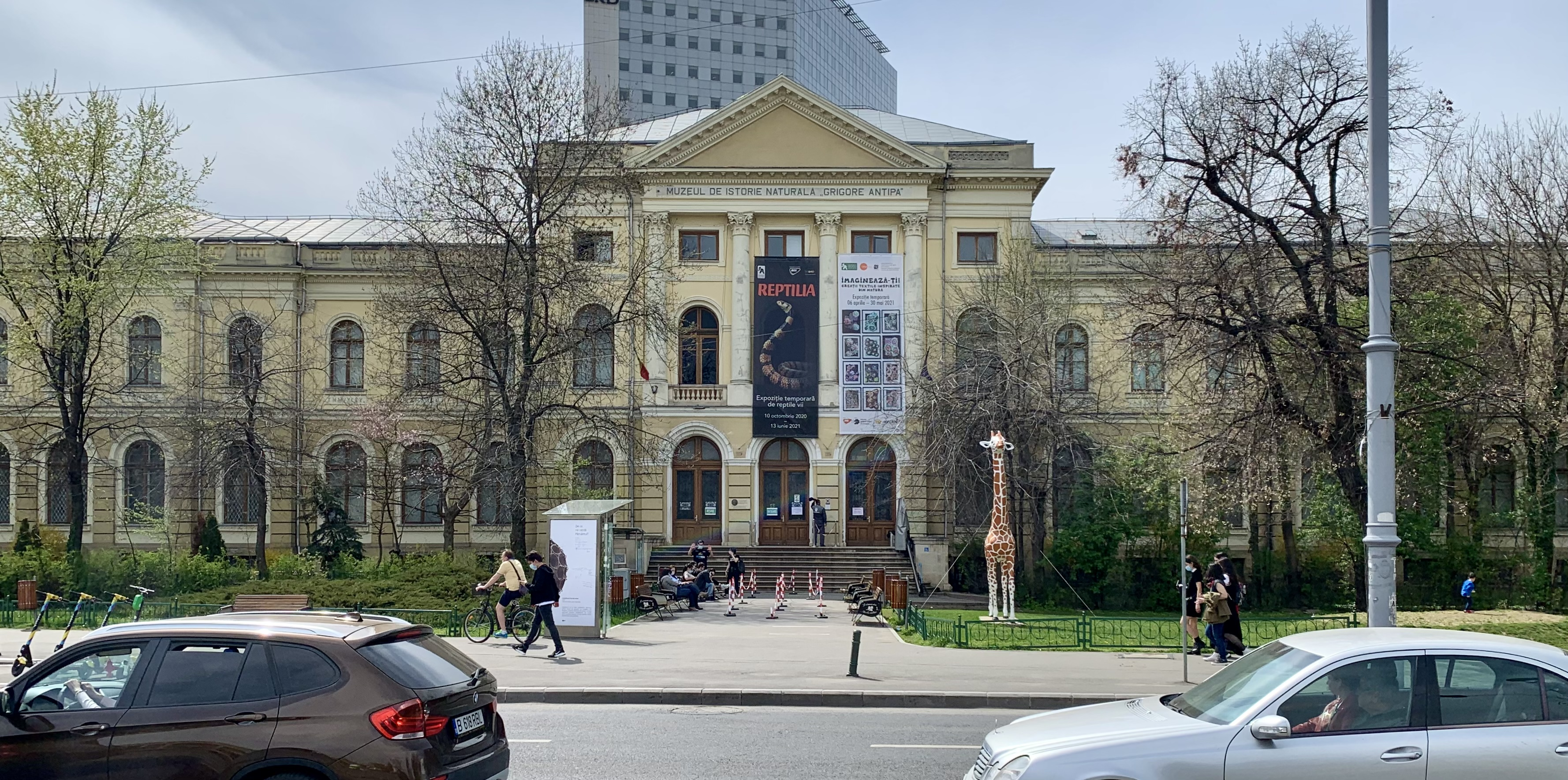
Main entrance

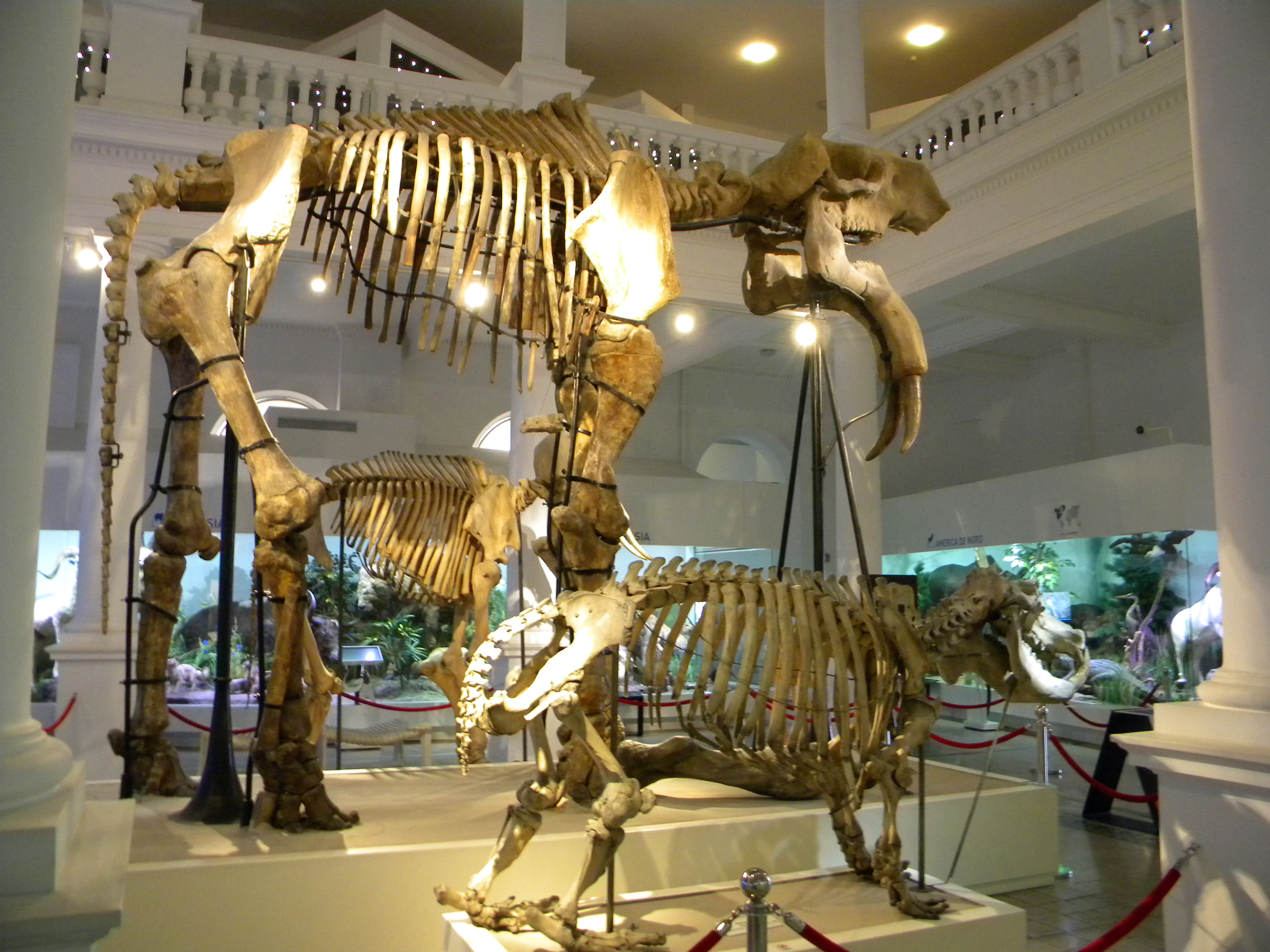
The worldwide only intact skeleton of a Deinotherium gigantissimum

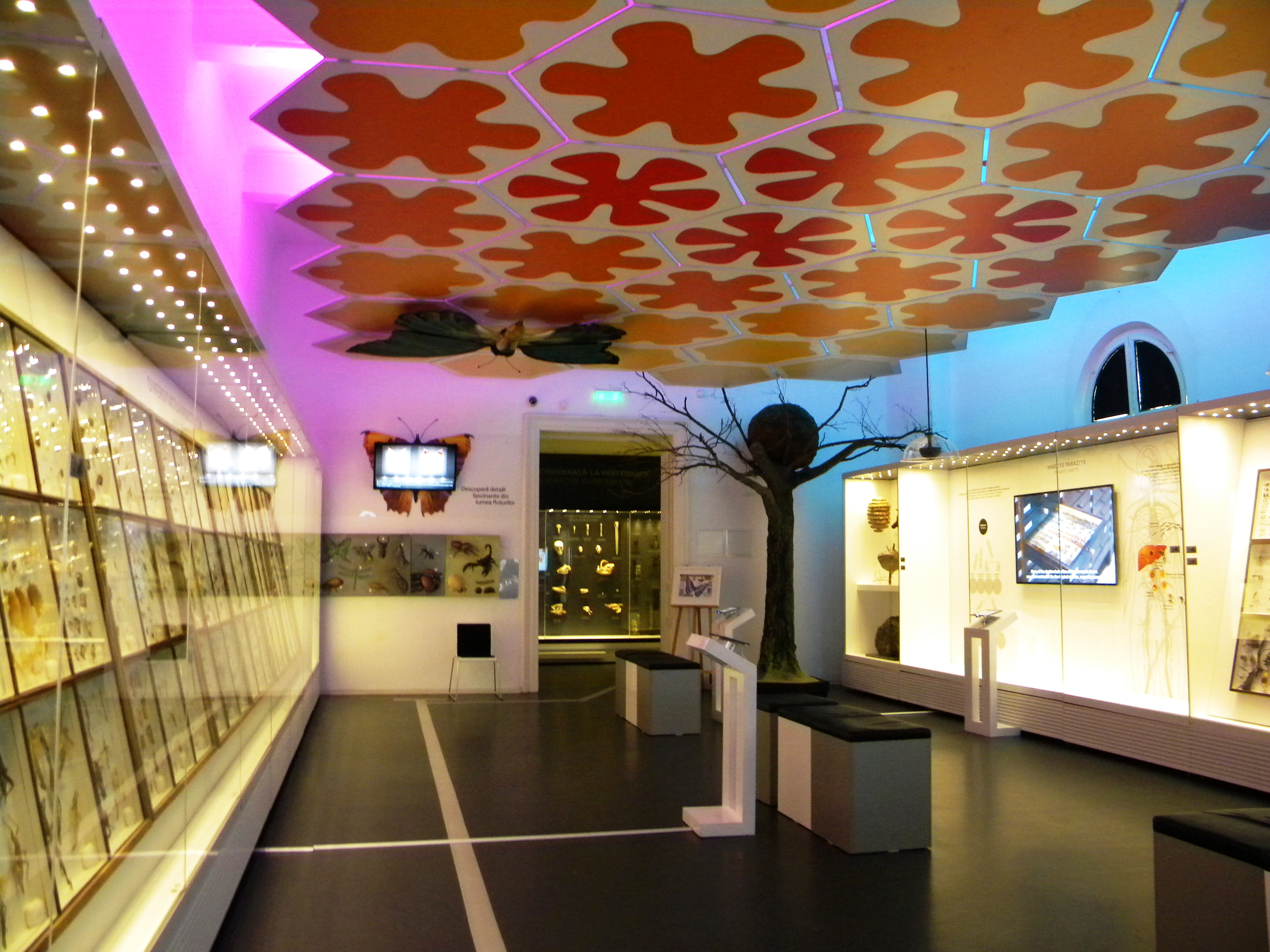
The butterflies chamber
