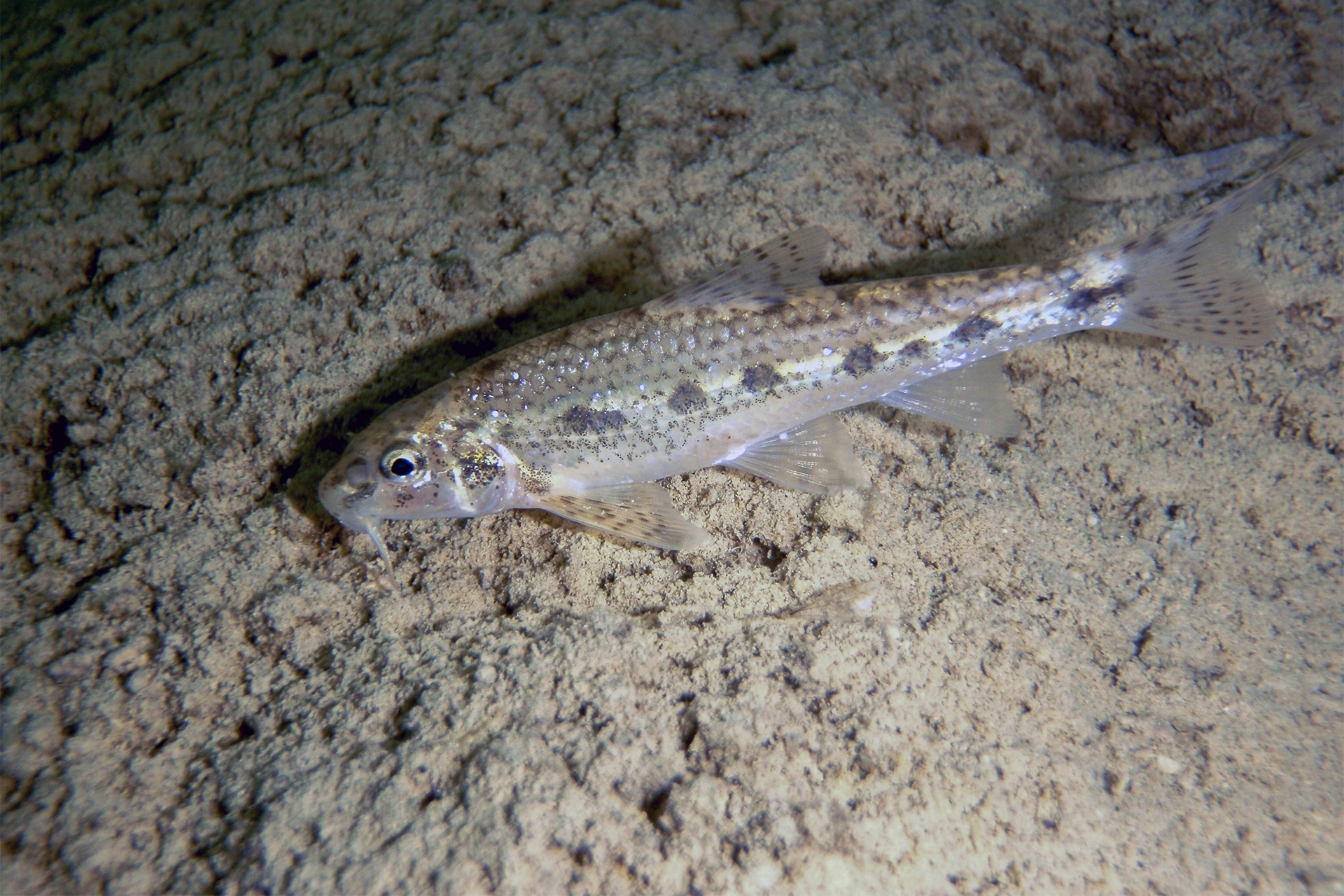

Conservation status
- Near Threatened (IUCN 3.1)

Scientific classification
- Kingdom: Animalia
- Phylum: Chordata
- Class: Actinopterygii
- Order: Cypriniformes
- Family: Gobionidae
- Genus: Romanogobio
- Species: R. benacensis

Binomial name
- Romanogobio benacensis (Pollini (ru), 1816)
- Distriburtion of Romanogobio benacensis

Synonyms
- Cyprinus benacensis Pollini, 1816; Gobio benacensis (Pollini, 1816); Gobio pollinii De Betta, 1862

= Romanogobio benacensis =

Species of fish

Romanogobio benacensis, the Italian gudgeon, is a species of freshwater ray-finned fish belonging to the family Gobionidae, the gudgeons. It is found in Italy and Slovenia. Its natural habitat is rivers. It is threatened by habitat loss.

The Latin specific epithet benacensis refers to Lake Garda in northern Italy, which was known to the Romans as 'Benacus'.
