= Giardino Botanico Rea =

Botanical garden in Italy

Coordinates: 45°2′N 7°25′E

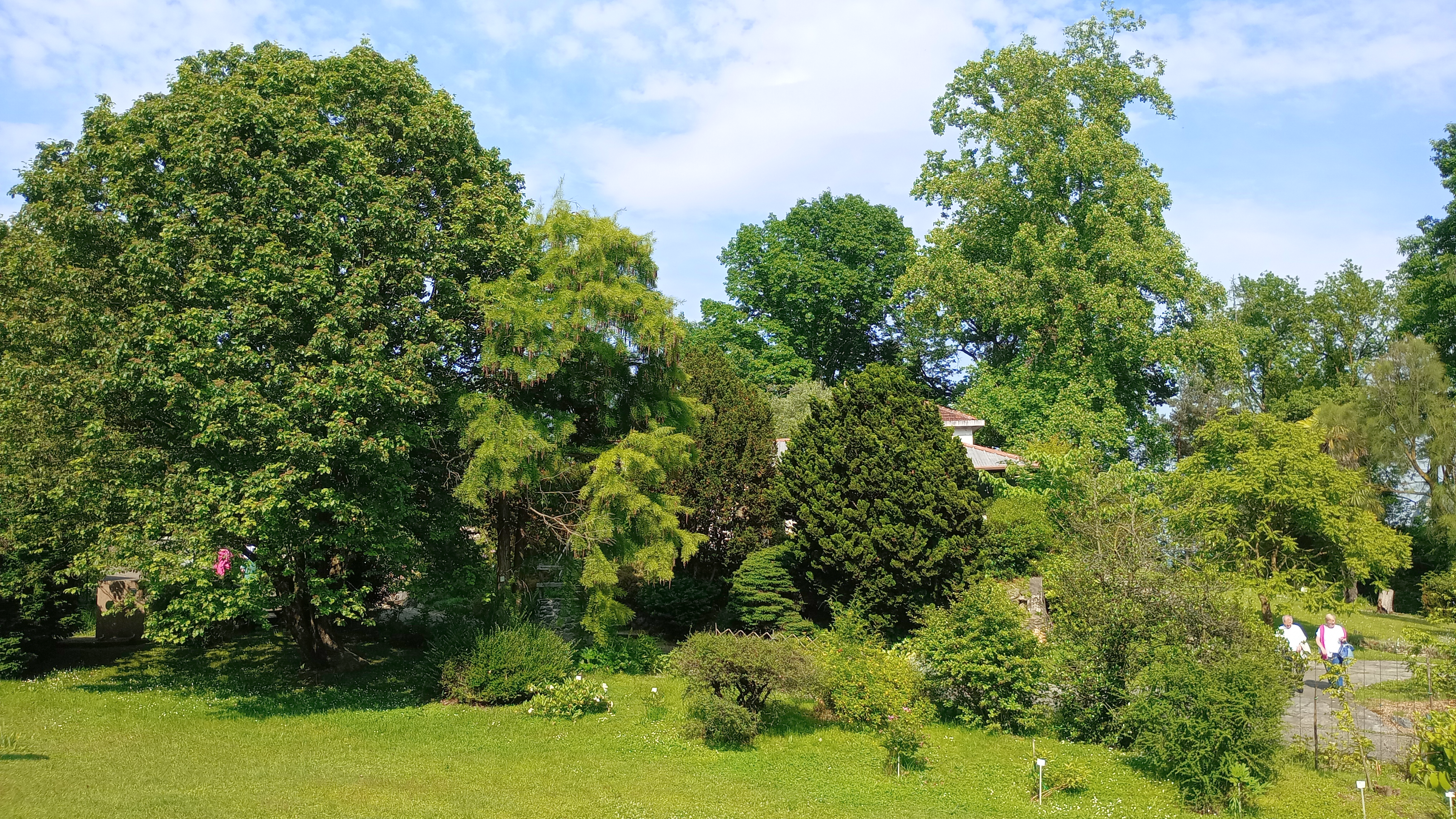
General view

The Giardino Botanico Rea is a botanical garden located 450 meters altitude in Val Sangone, at Trana, Province of Turin, Piedmont, northern Italy.

The garden was founded in 1967 by Giuseppe Giovanni Bellia as a private institution. In 1968 it began to publish a newsletter, entitled "Rea" in 1969, and dedicated to Giovanni Francesco Rea (1773–1833), one of the earliest botanists to study flora of the Val Susa and Val Sangone. In the 1970s Bellia created collections of exotic plants, particularly succulents, and explored the Val Sangone collecting its rare plants. In 1989 the Garden was purchased by the Piedmont Region to become part of the Museo Regionale di Scienze Naturali di Torino, and in 1992 it opened to the public.

Today the garden contains more than 2,500 species. The garden's main sections include rare and critically endangered species of the foothills; local trees, shrubs, and Pteridophyta; aquatic plants, succulents, carnivorous plants, and epiphytes; rustic trees and shrubs; medical and aromatic plants; food and honey plants; ornamental plants; and textile plants. Of particular note are its collections of succulents (more than 200 specimens), carnivorous plants (e.g. Aldrovanda vesiculosa and Dionaea muscipula) grown in heated greenhouses, and rare local species.

== See also ==
- List of botanical gardens in Italy

== Sources ==
- G. G. Bellia, "Rea" dedicata a Giovanni Francesco, Re. Rea, 2:2-3, 1969.
- G. G. Bellia, "Rea Hortus Tranensis", in F. M. Raimondo (ed.), Orti Botanici, Giardini Alpini, Arboreti Italiani, Edizioni Grifo, Palermo, pp 447–453, 1992.
- Pasin R. Camoletto, L. Quaranta, "Giardino Rea: collezioni, ricerca e divulgazione", Museol. Sci., XIV (1), Suppl.: 385–395, 1998.
- Touring Club Italiano, L'Italia dei giardini, Touring Editore, 2005, page 27. ISBN 88-365-3342-6.
