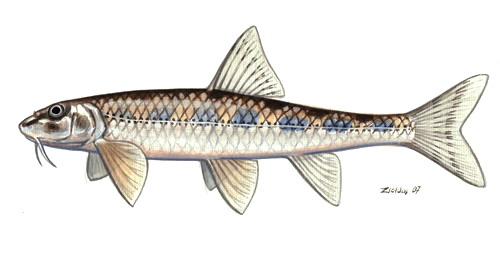

Conservation status
- Least Concern (IUCN 3.1)

Scientific classification
- Kingdom: Animalia
- Phylum: Chordata
- Class: Actinopterygii
- Order: Cypriniformes
- Family: Gobionidae
- Genus: Romanogobio
- Species: R. kesslerii

Binomial name
- Romanogobio kesslerii (Dybowski, 1862)

Synonyms
- Gobio kesslerii Dybowski, 1862; Gobio similis Chichkoff, 1929

= Kessler's gudgeon =

Species of fish

The Kessler's gudgeon (Romanogobio kesslerii) is a species of freshwater ray-finned fish belonging to the family Gobionidae, the gudgeons. It is found in the Danube and Vistula drainage basins, including parts of Poland, Austria, the Czech Republic, Ukraine, Bulgaria, Romania, Moldova, Hungary, Croatia, Bosnia and Herzegovina, Serbia, Montenegro, Slovakia, and Slovenia. It is a small fish of no economic or sporting importance. It was at one time classified as Gobio kesslerii.

== Etymology ==
It is named in honor of German-Russian zoologist Karl Fedorovich Kessler (1815–1881).

== Description ==
Kessler's gudgeon is a shallow-bodied, silvery fish with a pointed snout that grows to a length of about 12 centimetres (4.7 in) or occasionally 15 centimetres (5.9 in). It has a pair of barbels by the mouth which help it locate food and which are long enough to reach to the far side of the eye. The throat is scale-less, and there are 40 to 42 scales along the lateral line. The dorsal fin is made up of eight or nine branched rays.

== Distribution and habitat ==
Kessler's gudgeon is found in rivers and streams in the Danube basin, and favours stretches of fast-flowing water with sandy bottoms where the gradient begins to ease off at the foot of the mountains. It is also known from the San River system within the Vistula drainage area.

== Biology ==
Kessler's gudgeon is gregarious and feeds on invertebrates that lie on the river bed and prey that drifts past on the current.

Adults mature at two to three years of age, and spawning takes place in summer. The fish congregate in shallow areas with sandy or gravelly substrates and rise to the surface. The females release their eggs in batches, and the males release their milt. The eggs gradually sink to the bottom, where they stick to stones and weeds.

== Status ==
Kessler's gudgeon is listed as of "Least Concern" by the IUCN Red List of Threatened Species. There is some pollution of the rivers in which it lives and economic development on their banks. Its numbers are declining slowly, but it is a common species and does not currently warrant a higher level category.
