= Vadim Dmitrij Vladykov =

Ukrainian ichthyologist (1898–1986)

- Born: 18 March 1898; Koziyivka, Kharkiv Governorate, Russian Empire
- Died: 1986 (aged 87–88)
- Citizenship: Ukrainian
- Education: Kharkiv University; Charles University
- Known for: Founder of ichthyology in Transcarpathia; research on freshwater fish of Eastern Europe and North America
- Scientific career
- Fields: Ichthyology, Fish biology

Vadim Dmitrij Vladykov (18 March 1898 – 1986) was a Ukrainian ichthyologist considered the founder of modern ichthyology in Transcarpathia, former Czechoslovakia, and Canada.

== Early life and education ==
Vladykov was born in Koziyivka, Kharkiv Governorate, in the family of an Orthodox priest. He began his higher education at Kharkiv University under the zoologist Petro P. Sushkin.

During the Russian Civil War, he served with the White Army and subsequently emigrated to Czechoslovakia, where he continued his studies at Charles University in Prague.

== Research in Transcarpathia ==
In the 1920s, Vladykov conducted research in Transcarpathia, publishing approximately 20 scientific papers in German, Russian, French, and Czech. His studies included faunistic and taxonomic accounts of the local ichthyofauna, as well as ethnographic details such as local fish names and fishing methods.

His work on Fish of Subcarpathian Rus began in 1923, with a preliminary publication in 1927. During his studies, he created a collection of wet specimens, some of which are preserved at the Zoological Museum of UzhNU and others at the Transcarpathian Museum of Local Lore.

Vladykov left Transcarpathia in 1928.

== Career in emigration ==
After leaving Transcarpathia, he worked in France, then in Canada and the United States. Over his lifetime, Vladykov published 290 scientific works and described 39 new taxa.

== Honors ==
- Gold medal for research on Transcarpathian fish in Paris.
- The lamprey Eudontomyzon vladykovi was named in his honor.

== Selected publications related to Transcarpathia ==
- Über einige Fische aus der Tschechoslovakei (Karpatho-Russland) // Zool. Anzeiger. 1925. 64 (11/12): 217–374.
- Владыков, В. Рыбы Подкарпатской Руси и их главнѣйшіе способы ловли. Uzhhorod, 1926. 147 pp.
- Обычные названия рыб в различных местностях Подкарпатской Руси // «Просвите». Uzhhorod, 1927, pp. 205–232.
- Sur une nouvelle forme de gardon de la Russie Sous-carpathique (bassin du Danube) Rutilus rutilus carpathorossicus subsp. n. // Bulletin de la Société Zoologique de France 55. Paris, 1930: 103–107.
- Poissons de la Russie Sous-carpathique (Tchécoslovaquie) // Mémoires de la Société Zoologique de France. Paris, 1931. Tome 29 (4): 217–374.
