= Micromyzon akamai =

Scientific classification
- Kingdom: Animalia
- Phylum: Chordata
- Class: Actinopterygii
- Order: Siluriformes
- Family: Aspredinidae
- Genus: Micromyzon
- Species: M. akamai

Binomial name
- Micromyzon akamai Friel & Lundberg, 1996

Species of fish

Micromyzon akamai is a species of catfish (order Siluriformes) in the family Aspredinidae.

== Taxonomy ==
This genus and species were first described in 1996. This species is sister to a clade formed by Dupouyichthys and Ernstichthys.

== Distribution and habitat ==
Micromyzon akamai appears to have a patchy distribution. It has been found in the Amazon River basin as well as the lower Tocantins River.

Micromyzon akamai inhabits channels of the white-water rivers on sandy substrates at a depth of about 5–20 metres (16–66 ft). They have never been found in marginal habitats such as beaches or in small streams.

== Description ==
This species is a miniature species, with its maximum observed length being less than 16 millimetres (.63 in) SL. With females reaching sexual maturity between 11–16 mm (0.43–0.63 in), they are the smallest sexually mature aspredinids known.

This hoplomyzontine aspredinid is distinguished by the lack of eyes, extremely reduced and toothless premaxillae, the lateral line ossicles hypertrophied to form an armor of overlapping crescentic plates with dorsal and ventral limbs tilted anteriorly, the absence of longitudinal rows of large unculiferous tubercles along the lateral line and posterior portion of the body, and banding pigmentation pattern typical of other hoplomyzontines reduced.

This fish has a depressed (flattened) head with three knobs dorsally down the midline. The body is armoured with three rows of bony plates: the dorsal and ventral series have concave surfaces and are bordered by lateral ridges, while the lateral series have a convex surface with lateral ridge. The lower jaw is much shorter than the upper jaw. The gill openings are small, reduced to slits on the underside of the body anterior to the pectoral fin spines. The dorsal fin, which lacks a spine, is adnate with the body. The anal fin is not adnate with the body. The adipose fin is absent.

== Etymology ==
The fish is named in honor of Brazilian ichthyologist Alberto Akama, of the Museu Paraense Emílio Goeldi (Belém, Pará), for his help in collecting the type series.
