= Micromyzon orinoco =

Scientific classification
- Kingdom: Animalia
- Phylum: Chordata
- Class: Actinopterygii
- Order: Siluriformes
- Family: Aspredinidae
- Genus: Micromyzon
- Species: M. orinoco

Binomial name
- Micromyzon orinoco T. P Carvalho, Lundberg, Baskin, Friel & R. E. dos Reis, 2016

Species of fish

Micromyzon orinoco is a species of catfish (order Siluriformes) in the family Aspredinidae.

== Distribution and habitat ==
Micromyzon orinoco can be found in the main channel of lower Orinoco River in Venezuela near the town of Ciudad Guayana. They live on the sandy and muddy bottom of the river, at depths from 10 to 18 meters.

== Description ==
This species of the aspredinid catfish tribe Hoplomyzontini Micromyzon, was originally collected in expeditions led in 1978–79. This species differs from Micromyzon akamai in a number of particular physical and skeletal features but shares its small size and lack of eyes.

To identify this species, the examination and comparison process took nearly 40 years due to the rare and elusive nature of the species. They originally captured only two specimens. Its size, of less than 1 inch in length, added to the challenge of capture and identification.

High-Resolution X-ray Computed Tomography was used to scan the species and compare its skeleton to other hoplomyzontins

== Etymology ==
The name orinoco refers to the Orinoco river basin where the species was discovered (Río Orinoco).
