= Liobagrus chenghaiensis =

Scientific classification
- Kingdom: Animalia
- Phylum: Chordata
- Class: Actinopterygii
- Order: Siluriformes
- Family: Amblycipitidae
- Genus: Liobagrus
- Species: L. chenghaiensis

Binomial name
- Liobagrus chenghaiensis Sun, Ren & Zhang, 2013

Species of fish

Liobagrus chenghaiensis is a species of catfish in the family Amblycipitidae (the torrent catfishes) endemic to China, where it is only known from lake Chenghai in the province of Yunnan.

L. chenghaiensis is distinguished from all other species of Liobagrus with a serrated posterior margin of the pectoral-fin spine by possessing a free apex on the posterior margin of the adipose fin. It is similar to L. marginatus in the presence of a subtruncate caudal fin, by which both are distinguished from all other Chinese congeners with a serrated posterior margin of the pectoral-fin spine. These two species are distinguished by differences in the body depth and the distance between the pelvic-fin insertion and the vent. Their distinction is also supported by osteological evidence.
