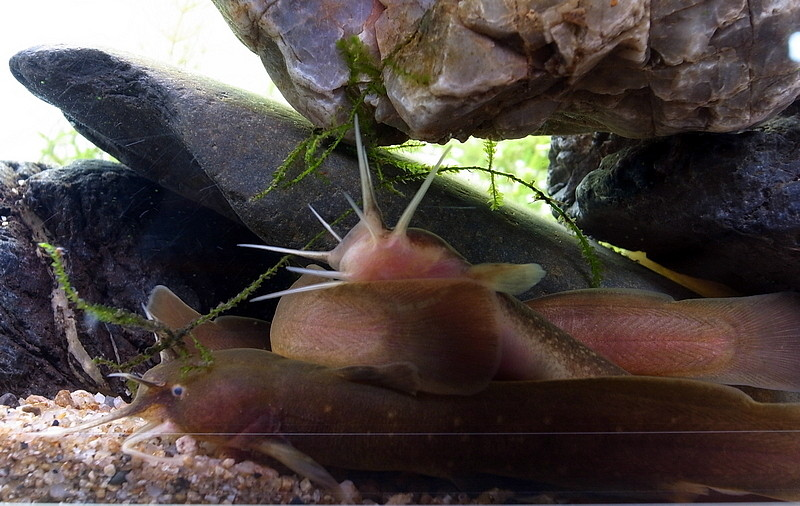
- Liobagrus reinii

Scientific classification
- Kingdom: Animalia
- Phylum: Chordata
- Class: Actinopterygii
- Order: Siluriformes
- Family: Amblycipitidae
- Genus: Liobagrus; Hilgendorf, 1878

Type species
- Liobagrus reinii Hilgendorf, 1878

Synonyms
- Neobagrus Bellotti, 1892

= Liobagrus =

Genus of fishes

Liobagrus is a genus of catfishes of the family Amblycipitidae. Liobagrus fishes are distributed in the Yangtze River basin, Taiwan, Japan, and the Korea Peninsula. The adipose fin of these fishes is a confluent with the caudal fin. The nostrils are far apart, unlike those found in Amblyceps. Most Liobagrus species grow to about 100 mm (3.9 in) SL.

== Taxonomy ==
No shared derived characteristic has been found to diagnose the genus Liobagrus. However, it is maintained that this genus is currently monophyletic. Liobagrus has been placed in the family Bagridae. Later, it was found to more closely resemble Amblyceps, and was transferred to Amblycipitidae.

Xiurenbagrus was erected because Liobagrus would not be monophyletic with Liobagrus xiurenensis, now Xiurenbagrus xiurenensis. The genera Amblyceps and Liobagrus are sister group pair that is, in turn, sister to Xiurenbagrus.

== Species ==
There are currently 22 recognized species in this genus:

- Liobagrus aequilabris J. J. Wright & H. H. Ng, 2008
- Liobagrus andersoni Regan, 1908
- Liobagrus anguillicauda Nichols, 1926
- Liobagrus brevispina Xie, Cao & Zhang, 2022
- Liobagrus chengduensis Chen, Guo, Wu & Wen, 2022
- Liobagrus chenghaiensis Z. W. Sun, S. J. Ren & E. Zhang, 2013
- Liobagrus chenhaojuni Chen, Guo & Wu, 2024
- Liobagrus formosanus Regan, 1908
- Liobagrus geumgangensis Kim, Yun & Park, 2023
- Liobagrus huaiheensis Chen, Wu & Wen, 2021
- Liobagrus hyeongsanensis S. H. Kim, H. S. Kim & J. Y. Park, 2015
- Liobagrus kingi T. L. Tchang, 1935
- Liobagrus marginatoides (H. W. Wu, 1930)
- Liobagrus marginatus (Günther, 1892)
- Liobagrus mediadiposalis T. Mori, 1936
- Liobagrus nantoensis Oshima, 1919
- Liobagrus nigricauda Regan, 1904
- Liobagrus obesus Y. M. Son, I. S. Kim & I. Y. Choo, 1987 (Bull-head torrent catfish)
- Liobagrus pseudostyani Chen & Guo, 2021
- Liobagrus reinii Hilgendorf, 1878
- Liobagrus somjinensis J. Y. Park & S. H. Kim, 2010
- Liobagrus styani Regan, 1908
