= Megalonema amaxanthum =

Conservation status
- Least Concern (IUCN 3.1)

Scientific classification
- Kingdom: Animalia
- Phylum: Chordata
- Class: Actinopterygii
- Order: Siluriformes
- Family: Pimelodidae
- Genus: Megalonema
- Species: M. amaxanthum

Binomial name
- Megalonema amaxanthum Lundberg & Dahdul, 2008

Species of ray-finned fish

Megalonema amaxanthum is a species of long-whiskered catfish. Males and females grow to a maximum standard length of 31.2 cm (12.3 in) and 24.1 cm (9.5 in) respectively.
