= Acanthobunocephalus nicoi =

Conservation status
- Least Concern (IUCN 3.1)

Scientific classification
- Kingdom: Animalia
- Phylum: Chordata
- Class: Actinopterygii
- Order: Siluriformes
- Family: Aspredinidae
- Genus: Acanthobunocephalus
- Species: A. nicoi

Binomial name
- Acanthobunocephalus nicoi Friel, 1995

Species of fish

Acanthobunocephalus nicoi is one of two species of catfish (order Siluriformes) in the genus Acanthobunocephalus of the family Aspredinidae. This species is known from only three localities and appears to be restricted to the upper Orinoco River system of Venezuela and possibly the upper Rio Negro system of Brazil.

Acanthobunocephalus nicoi can be differentiated from other aspredinids by the presence of a dorsal fin spine locking mechanism and a rigid dorsal fin spine. The lateral line is truncated at about the dorsal fin level. The head is depressed and the caudal peduncle is slender, tapering to the caudal fin. The mouth is terminal, with the jaws and lips equal. The dorsal and anal fin membranes are not adnate with the body. These fish reach sexual maturity at just over 16 millimetres (.63 in) SL, and have not been observed to exceed 20 mm (.79 in) SL.

This species is found in flooded plants, primarily grasses and sedges, in black water (stained by tannin).
