= Xiurenbagrus songamensis =

Conservation status
- Data Deficient (IUCN 3.1)

Scientific classification
- Kingdom: Animalia
- Phylum: Chordata
- Class: Actinopterygii
- Division: Teleostei
- Order: Siluriformes
- Family: Amblycipitidae
- Genus: Xiurenbagrus
- Species: X. songamensis

Binomial name
- Xiurenbagrus songamensis (V. H. Nguyễn & V. B. Vo, 2006)

Synonyms
- Nahangbagrus songamensis

Species of fish

Xiurenbagrus songamensis is a species of torrent catfish endemic to Vietnam. It is sometimes classified as the only member of the monospecific genus Nahangbagrus.
