= Xyliphius melanopterus =

Scientific classification
- Kingdom: Animalia
- Phylum: Chordata
- Class: Actinopterygii
- Order: Siluriformes
- Family: Aspredinidae
- Genus: Xyliphius
- Species: X. melanopterus

Binomial name
- Xyliphius melanopterus Orcés-V. (es), 1962

Species of fish

Xyliphius melanopterus is a species of banjo catfish found in Ecuador, Peru and Venezuela, occurring in the upper Amazon and Orinoco River basins. It grows to a standard length of 14.7 cm (5.8 in).
