= Megalonema orixanthum =

Conservation status
- Least Concern (IUCN 3.1)

Scientific classification
- Kingdom: Animalia
- Phylum: Chordata
- Class: Actinopterygii
- Order: Siluriformes
- Family: Pimelodidae
- Genus: Megalonema
- Species: M. orixanthum

Binomial name
- Megalonema orixanthum Lundberg & Dahdul, 2008

Species of fish

Megalonema orixanthum is a species of long-whiskered catfish. It grows to a maximum standard length of 11.6 cm (4.6 in).
