= Xiurenbagrus xiurenensis =

Conservation status
- Data Deficient (IUCN 3.1)

Scientific classification
- Kingdom: Animalia
- Phylum: Chordata
- Class: Actinopterygii
- Order: Siluriformes
- Family: Amblycipitidae
- Genus: Xiurenbagrus
- Species: X. xiurenensis

Binomial name
- Xiurenbagrus xiurenensis (Yue, 1981)

Species of fish

Xiurenbagrus xiurenensis is a species of catfish of the family Amblycipitidae. It reaches a maximum total length of 10 cm (3.9 in).
