= Acanthobunocephalus scruggsi =

Conservation status
- Vulnerable (IUCN 3.1)

Scientific classification
- Domain: Eukaryota
- Kingdom: Animalia
- Phylum: Chordata
- Class: Actinopterygii
- Order: Siluriformes
- Family: Aspredinidae
- Genus: Acanthobunocephalus
- Species: A. scruggsi

Binomial name
- Acanthobunocephalus scruggsi Carvalho & Reis, 2020

Species of catfish

Acanthobunocephalus scruggsi is a species of banjo catfish found in the tributaries of the lower Purus River. Due to gold mining in the region, the species could become more critically endangered and possibly even be driven into extinction.

They have fewer fin rays than other members of the family Asprinidae, having four rays on their pectoral fins, two on their dorsal fins, five on their pelvic fins, four or five on their anal fins, and nine on their caudal fins; other Asprinids (banjo catfish) have at least five (pectoral), at least three (dorsal), six (pelvic), six or more (anal), and ten or more (caudal, with a few other exceptions. It is a very small species, measuring only 2.2 cm in length at maximum. In colour, it is mostly dark brown to black, with some lighter regions, such as the underside and the tips of the fins.

The species is named after the American banjo player Earl Scruggs.
