= Ernstichthys intonsus =

Conservation status
- Data Deficient (IUCN 3.1)

Scientific classification
- Kingdom: Animalia
- Phylum: Chordata
- Class: Actinopterygii
- Order: Siluriformes
- Family: Aspredinidae
- Genus: Ernstichthys
- Species: E. intonsus

Binomial name
- Ernstichthys intonsus D. J. Stewart, 1985

Species of fish

Ernstichthys intonsus is a species of banjo catfish that is endemic to Ecuador where it is found in the Napo River basin. This fish grows to a length of 4.9 cm (1.9 in) SL.
