= Amaralia hypsiura =

Scientific classification
- Kingdom: Animalia
- Phylum: Chordata
- Class: Actinopterygii
- Order: Siluriformes
- Family: Aspredinidae
- Genus: Amaralia
- Species: A. hypsiura

Binomial name
- Amaralia hypsiura (Kner, 1855)

Species of fish

Amaralia hypsiura is a species of catfish of the family Aspredinidae. A. hypsiura are found throughout the Amazon River basin. They are medium-sized aspredinids (not exceeding 133 millimetres or 5.2 in SL). These fish have a deep, laterally compressed caudal peduncle, a reduced dorsal fin with only 2–3 rays, and well-developed head ornamentation.
