= Amblyceps carinatum =

Conservation status
- Data Deficient (IUCN 3.1)

Scientific classification
- Kingdom: Animalia
- Phylum: Chordata
- Class: Actinopterygii
- Order: Siluriformes
- Family: Amblycipitidae
- Genus: Amblyceps
- Species: A. carinatum

Binomial name
- Amblyceps carinatum Ng, 2005

Species of fish

Amblyceps carinatum is a species of catfish belonging to the family Amblycipitidae. It is only known from the upper part of the Irrawaddy River basin in Myanmar.

This is a small catfish (up to 36 mm standard length) found in fast flowing streams. The main characteristic which distinguishes it from its congeners is the shape of the adipose fin: in A. carinatum it takes the form of a long low ridge starting just behind the dorsal fin whilst in all other Amblyceps species it is blade-shaped and starts well behind the dorsal fin.
