= Xyliphius lombarderoi =

Scientific classification
- Kingdom: Animalia
- Phylum: Chordata
- Class: Actinopterygii
- Order: Siluriformes
- Family: Aspredinidae
- Genus: Xyliphius
- Species: X. lombarderoi

Binomial name
- Xyliphius lombarderoi F. J. J. Risso & E. N. P. de Risso, 1964

Species of fish

Xyliphius lombarderoi is a species of banjo catfish endemic to Argentina where it occurs in the Paraná River basin. It grows to a standard length of 9.9 cm (3.9 in).
