= Liobagrus nigricauda =

Conservation status
- Endangered (IUCN 3.1)

Scientific classification
- Kingdom: Animalia
- Phylum: Chordata
- Class: Actinopterygii
- Order: Siluriformes
- Family: Amblycipitidae
- Genus: Liobagrus
- Species: L. nigricauda

Binomial name
- Liobagrus nigricauda Regan, 1904

Species of fish

Liobagrus nigricauda is a species of catfish in the family Amblycipitidae (the torrent catfishes). It is endemic to Lake Dianchi in China. This species grows to a length of 10 centimetres (3.9 in) TL.
