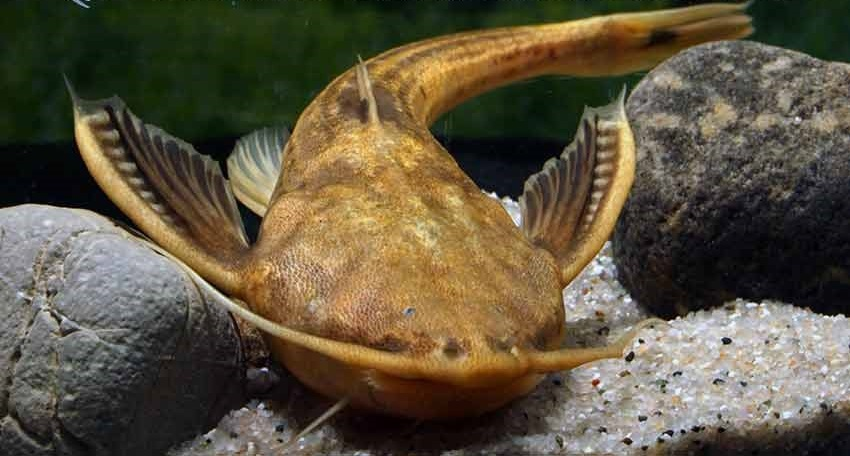

Scientific classification
- Kingdom: Animalia
- Phylum: Chordata
- Class: Actinopterygii
- Order: Siluriformes
- Family: Aspredinidae
- Genus: Xyliphius
- Species: X. magdalenae

Binomial name
- Xyliphius magdalenae C. H. Eigenmann, 1912

= Xyliphius magdalenae =

Species of fish

Xyliphius magdalenae is a species of banjo catfish endemic to Colombia where it is found in the Magdalena River basin. It grows to a standard length of 8.0 cm (3.1 in).
