= Liobagrus mediadiposalis =

Scientific classification
- Kingdom: Animalia
- Phylum: Chordata
- Class: Actinopterygii
- Order: Siluriformes
- Family: Amblycipitidae
- Genus: Liobagrus
- Species: L. mediadiposalis

Binomial name
- Liobagrus mediadiposalis Mori, 1936

Species of fish

Liobagrus mediadiposalis is a species of catfish in the family Amblycipitidae (the torrent catfishes) endemic to South Korea. This species reaches a length of 13.3 centimetres (5.2 in) TL.
