= Liobagrus styani =

Scientific classification
- Kingdom: Animalia
- Phylum: Chordata
- Class: Actinopterygii
- Order: Siluriformes
- Family: Amblycipitidae
- Genus: Liobagrus
- Species: L. styani

Binomial name
- Liobagrus styani Regan, 1908

Species of fish

Liobagrus styani is a species of catfish in the family Amblycipitidae (the torrent catfishes) endemic to the province of Hubei in China. This species reaches a length of 12 centimetres (4.7 in) TL.
