= Ernstichthys anduzei =

Scientific classification
- Kingdom: Animalia
- Phylum: Chordata
- Class: Actinopterygii
- Order: Siluriformes
- Family: Aspredinidae
- Genus: Ernstichthys
- Species: E. anduzei

Binomial name
- Ernstichthys anduzei Fernández-Yépez, 1953

Species of fish

Ernstichthys anduzei is a species of banjo catfish endemic to the Orinoco River basin of Venezuela. It grows to a length of 3.5 cm (1.4 in) SL.
