= Pterobunocephalus dolichurus =

Scientific classification
- Domain: Eukaryota
- Kingdom: Animalia
- Phylum: Chordata
- Class: Actinopterygii
- Order: Siluriformes
- Family: Aspredinidae
- Genus: Pterobunocephalus
- Species: P. dolichurus

Binomial name
- Pterobunocephalus dolichurus (Delsman, 1941)

Species of fish

Pterobunocephalus dolichurus is a species of banjo catfish found in Brazil and Peru where it is native to the Amazon River Basin. It grows to a length of 6.7 cm.
