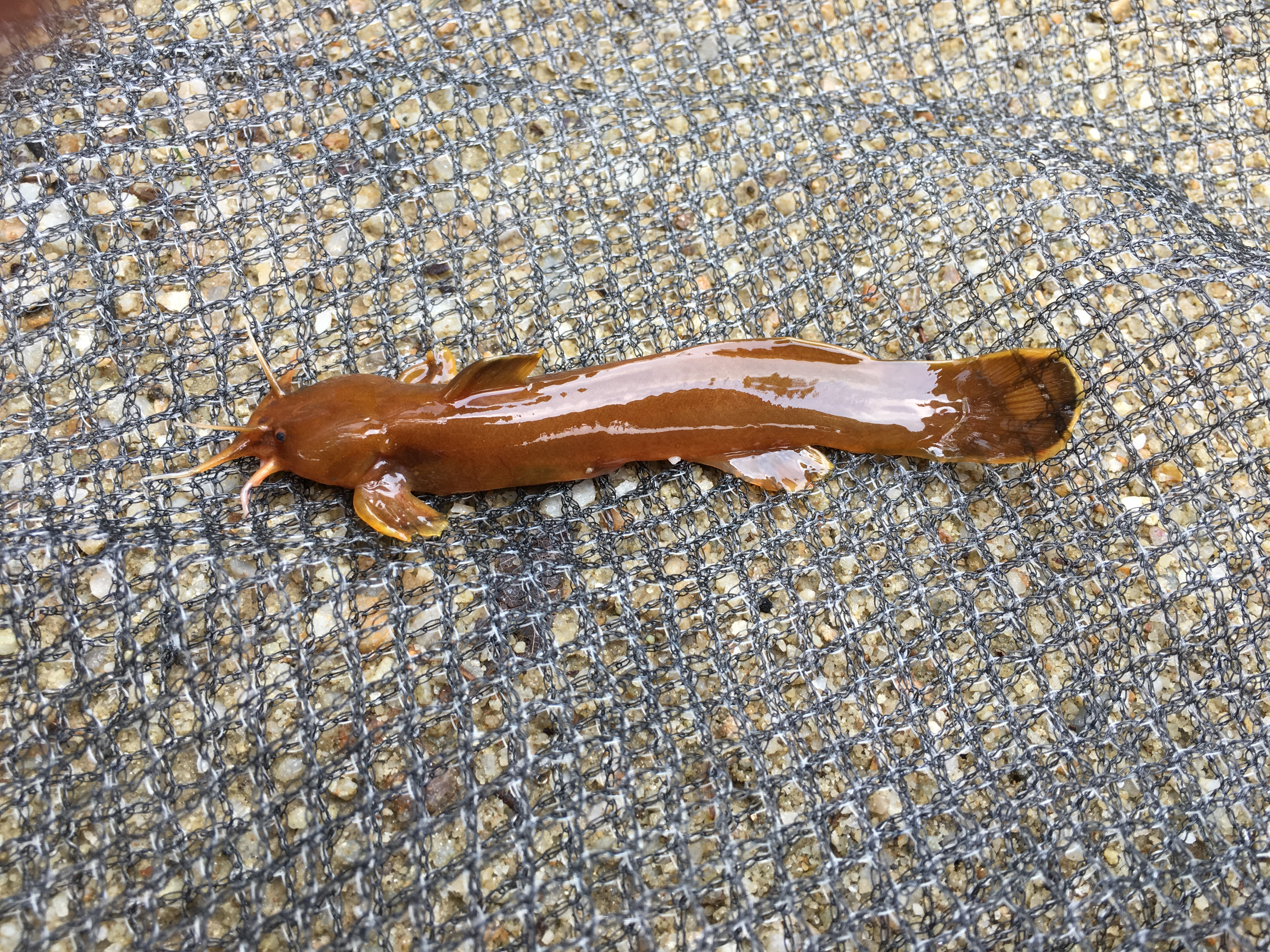

Scientific classification
- Domain: Eukaryota
- Kingdom: Animalia
- Phylum: Chordata
- Class: Actinopterygii
- Order: Siluriformes
- Family: Amblycipitidae
- Genus: Liobagrus
- Species: L. andersoni

Binomial name
- Liobagrus andersoni Regan, 1908

= Liobagrus andersoni =

Species of fish

Liobagrus andersoni is a species of catfish in the family Amblycipitidae (the torrent catfishes) endemic to South Korea. This species reaches a length of 15 centimetres (5.9 in) TL.
