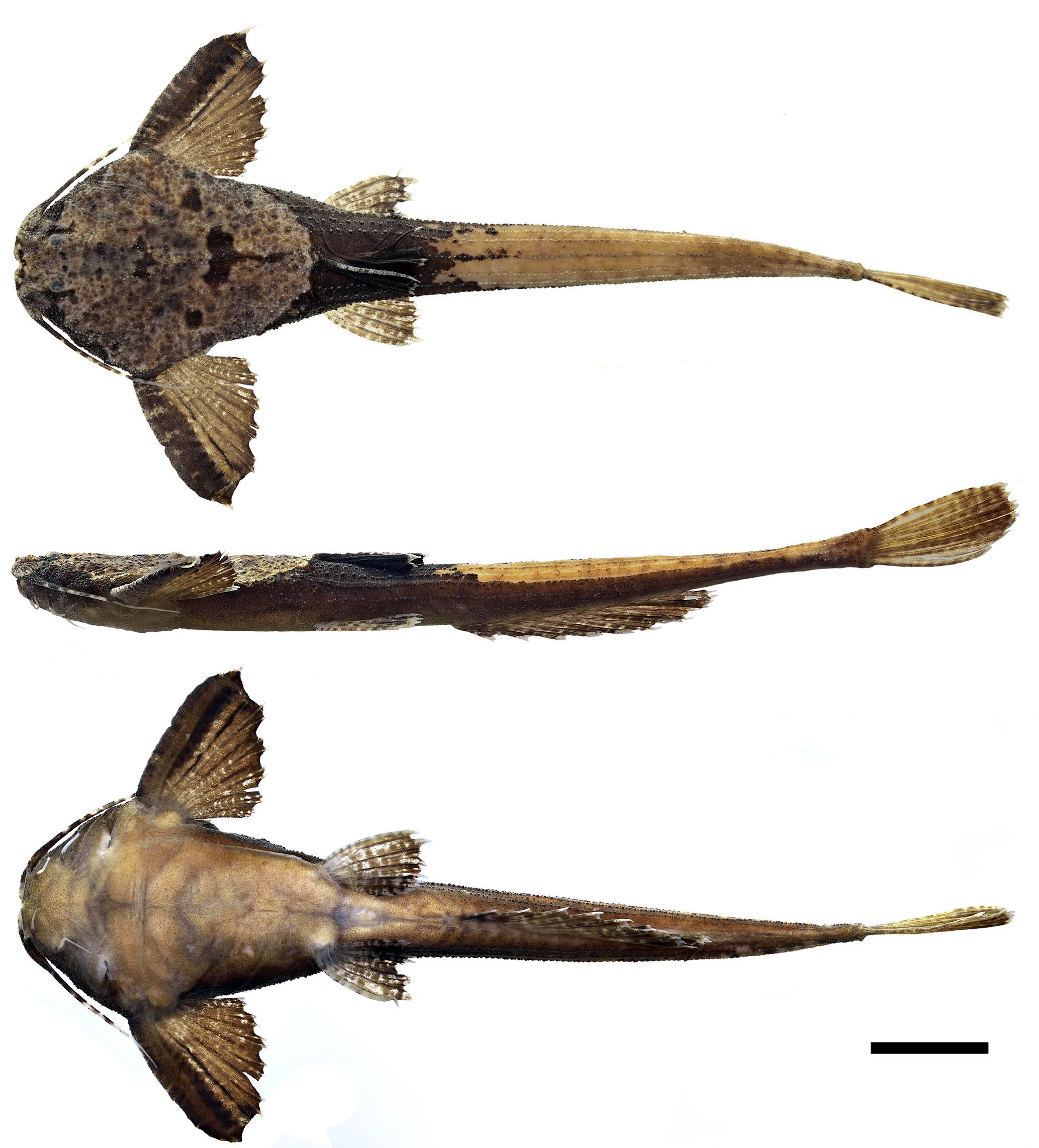
- Holotype specimen. Image bar = 10 mm.

Scientific classification
- Kingdom: Animalia
- Phylum: Chordata
- Class: Actinopterygii
- Order: Siluriformes
- Family: Aspredinidae
- Genus: Pterobunocephalus
- Species: P. carvalhoi

Binomial name
- Pterobunocephalus carvalhoi Crispim, Argüello, Silva, Oliveira, Luckenbill & Sabaj, 2026

= Pterobunocephalus carvalhoi =

Species of siluriform fish

Pterobunocephalus carvalhoi is a species of siluriform fish that belongs to the family Aspredinidae. It inhabits the upper Amazonian basin of Ecuador in the Napo, Pastaza, and Putumayo rivers. It has large eyes.

The specific name "carvalhoi" is in honor to the Brazilian ichthyologist Tiago Pinto Carvalho for his far-reaching contributions to the study of fish species in the Neotropical realm and on particular the taxonomy and systematics of the family Aspredinidae.

== Discovery ==
The holotype specimen, MEPN-I 20199, was collected from a named river located at 00°27’53”S 76°19’09”W, around 300 meters from the Sani Isla North oil well platform.
