= Xyliphius barbatus =

Scientific classification
- Kingdom: Animalia
- Phylum: Chordata
- Class: Actinopterygii
- Order: Siluriformes
- Family: Aspredinidae
- Genus: Xyliphius
- Species: X. barbatus

Binomial name
- Xyliphius barbatus Alonso de Arámburu & Arámburu, 1962

Species of fish

Xyliphius barbatus is a species of banjo catfish that is endemic to Argentina where it is found in the Paraguay-Paraná River system basin. It grows to a maximum standard length of 9.9 cm (3.9 in).
