= Micromyzon =

Scientific classification
- Kingdom: Animalia
- Phylum: Chordata
- Class: Actinopterygii
- Order: Siluriformes
- Family: Aspredinidae
- Subfamily: Hoplomyzontinae
- Genus: Micromyzon; Friel & Lundberg, 1996

Genus of fishes

Micromyzon is a genus of tiny catfish in the family Aspredinidae native to relatively deep parts of the Amazon and Orinoco basins in South America.

== Species ==
There are currently 2 recognized species in this genus:

- Micromyzon akamai Friel & Lundberg, 1996
- Micromyzon orinoco T. P Carvalho, Lundberg, Baskin, Friel & R. E. dos Reis, 2016
