= Xiurenbagrus gigas =

Scientific classification
- Kingdom: Animalia
- Phylum: Chordata
- Class: Actinopterygii
- Order: Siluriformes
- Family: Amblycipitidae
- Genus: Xiurenbagrus
- Species: X. gigas

Binomial name
- Xiurenbagrus gigas Zhao, Lan & Zhang, 2004

Species of fish

Xiurenbagrus gigas is a species of catfish found in Asia of the family Amblycipitidae. It reaches a maximum standard length of 16.5 cm (6.5 in).
