= Liobagrus aequilabris =

Scientific classification
- Kingdom: Animalia
- Phylum: Chordata
- Class: Actinopterygii
- Order: Siluriformes
- Family: Amblycipitidae
- Genus: Liobagrus
- Species: L. aequilabris

Binomial name
- Liobagrus aequilabris Wright & Ng, 2008

Species of fish

Liobagrus aequilabris is a species of catfish in the family Amblycipitidae (the torrent catfishes). This species is endemic to China, where it is only known from the Xiang River, a tributary of the Yangtze River, in Guangxi province, but may also be present in the Li River, a tributary of the Pearl River, due to the presence of the Lingqu Canal connecting the Xiang and Li Rivers.

L. aequilabris reaches a length of 6.2 centimetres (2.4 in) SL. It differs from other members of its genus in lacking large, retrorse serrations on the posterior edge of the pectoral-fin spine, having upper and lower jaws of equal length, relatively long dorsal (7.5-10.2 % of SL) and pectoral-fin (9.1-12.1 % of SL) spines, a relatively long caudal fin (20.1-26.9 % of SL), and relatively few post-Weberian vertebrae (35-37).
