= Liobagrus marginatoides =

Scientific classification
- Kingdom: Animalia
- Phylum: Chordata
- Class: Actinopterygii
- Order: Siluriformes
- Family: Amblycipitidae
- Genus: Liobagrus
- Species: L. marginatoides

Binomial name
- Liobagrus marginatoides (Wu, 1930)

Synonyms
- Amblyceps marginatoides Wu, 1930

Species of fish

Liobagrus marginatoides is a species of catfish in the family Amblycipitidae (the torrent catfishes) endemic to the province of Sichuan in China. This species reaches a length of 8.5 centimetres (3.3 in) SL.
