= Liobagrus kingi =

Conservation status
- Endangered (IUCN 3.1)

Scientific classification
- Kingdom: Animalia
- Phylum: Chordata
- Class: Actinopterygii
- Order: Siluriformes
- Family: Amblycipitidae
- Genus: Liobagrus
- Species: L. kingi

Binomial name
- Liobagrus kingi T. L. Tchang, 1935

Species of fish

Liobagrus kingi, the King's bullhead, is a species of catfish in the family Amblycipitidae (the torrent catfishes) endemic to China, where it is known to occur in the lake Dianchi basin, in its tributaries and effluent river, the Zhangjiu, and two tributaries of the Jinshajiang (upper Yangtze) river in Sichuan and Yunnan. It has not been recorded in the lake since the 1960s. This species grows to a length of 9.5 centimetres (3.7 in) SL.
