= Ernstichthys megistus =

Conservation status
- Least Concern (IUCN 3.1)

Scientific classification
- Kingdom: Animalia
- Phylum: Chordata
- Class: Actinopterygii
- Order: Siluriformes
- Family: Aspredinidae
- Genus: Ernstichthys
- Species: E. megistus

Binomial name
- Ernstichthys megistus (Orcés-V. (es), 1961)

Species of fish

Ernstichthys megistus is a species of banjo catfish found in Ecuador and Peru where it occurs in the Bobonaza and Marañon River basins. It grows to a length of 6.7 cm (2.6 in) SL.
