= Xyliphius kryptos =

Scientific classification
- Kingdom: Animalia
- Phylum: Chordata
- Class: Actinopterygii
- Order: Siluriformes
- Family: Aspredinidae
- Genus: Xyliphius
- Species: X. kryptos

Binomial name
- Xyliphius kryptos Taphorn & Lilyestrom, 1983

Species of fish

Xyliphius kryptos is a species of banjo catfish endemic to Venezuela where it is found in the Lake Maracaibo basin. It grows to a maximum standard length of 11.0 cm (4.3 in).
