= Aspredinichthys tibicen =

Scientific classification
- Domain: Eukaryota
- Kingdom: Animalia
- Phylum: Chordata
- Class: Actinopterygii
- Order: Siluriformes
- Family: Aspredinidae
- Genus: Aspredinichthys
- Species: A. tibicen

Binomial name
- Aspredinichthys tibicen (Valenciennes in Cuvier and Valenciennes, 1840)

Species of fish

Aspredinichthys tibicen, the tenbarbed banjo, is a species of banjo catfish found in coastal brackish waters and coastal rivers in South America from Venezuela to Brazil including the island nation of Trinidad and Tobago. This species practices an unusual method of incubation of the eggs, attaching them to the underside of the female who then carries them around. This species is of minor importance in commercial fisheries and is also seen in the aquarium trade.
