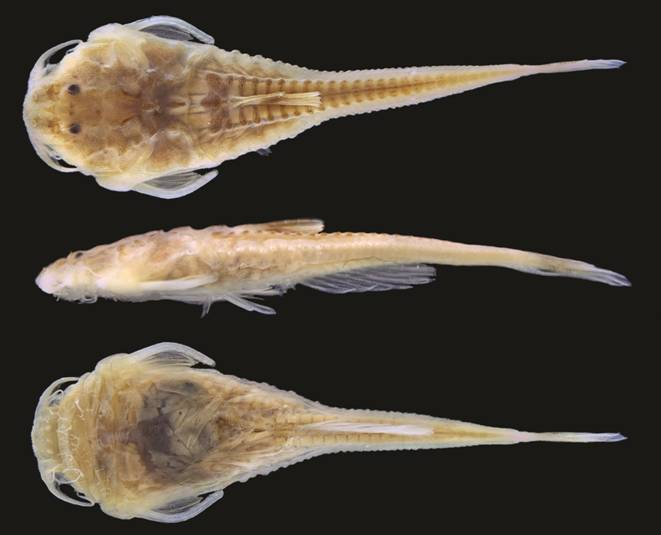

Conservation status
- Endangered (IUCN 3.1)

Scientific classification
- Kingdom: Animalia
- Phylum: Chordata
- Class: Actinopterygii
- Order: Siluriformes
- Family: Aspredinidae
- Genus: Hoplomyzon
- Species: H. cardosoi

Binomial name
- Hoplomyzon cardosoi Carvalho, Reis & Friel, 2017

= Hoplomyzon cardosoi =

Species of fish

Hoplomyzon cardosoi, is a species of fish from the genus Hoplomyzon. The species was originally described by Tiago P. Carvalho, Roberto E. Reis and John P. Friel in 2017

== Description ==
Hoplomyzon cardosoi is a miniature species of banjo catfish from Lake Maracaibo in Venezuela. They have a length between 1.5 and 1.9 cm (0.59 and 0.75 in)

== Distribution and habitat ==
Hoplomyzon cardosoi is endemic to the Maracaibo Basin in the Zulia State in Venezuela

== Etymology ==
Hoplomyzon cardosoi is named after Alexandre Rodrigues Cardoso
