= Liobagrus obesus =

Conservation status
- Endangered (IUCN 3.1)

Scientific classification
- Kingdom: Animalia
- Phylum: Chordata
- Class: Actinopterygii
- Order: Siluriformes
- Family: Amblycipitidae
- Genus: Liobagrus
- Species: L. obesus

Binomial name
- Liobagrus obesus Son, I. S. Kim & Choo, 1987

Species of fish

Liobagrus obesus, the bull-head torrent catfish, is an endangered species of catfish in the family Amblycipitidae (the torrent catfishes) endemic to South Korea, where it occurs in the middle parts of the Geum, Mangyeong, and Yeongsan rivers. This species reaches a length of 10 centimetres (3.9 in) TL.

== Habitat and ecology ==
L. obesus inhabits gravel and rock bottoms in areas with slow water velocity.

== Conservation status ==
Anthropogenic activities, such as river development and water pollution, have caused a rapid decline in L. obesus populations. The species has been protected by the Endangered Species Act, under Korean law, since 2005 and was classified as endangered (EN) in the Red Data Book of endangered fishes in Korea in 2012.
