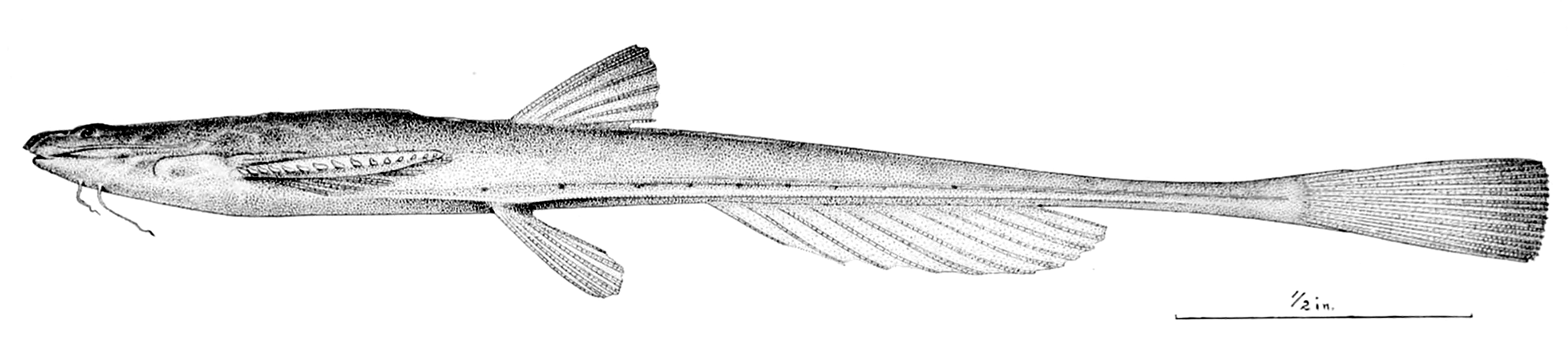

Scientific classification
- Kingdom: Animalia
- Phylum: Chordata
- Class: Actinopterygii
- Division: Teleostei
- Order: Siluriformes
- Family: Aspredinidae
- Genus: Pterobunocephalus
- Species: P. depressus

Binomial name
- Pterobunocephalus depressus (Haseman, 1911)

= Pterobunocephalus depressus =

Species of fish

Pterobunocephalus depressus is a species of banjo catfish that occurs in Argentina, Bolivia, Brazil, Ecuador, Paraguay and Venezuela. It reaches a length of 8.9 cm (3.5 in).
