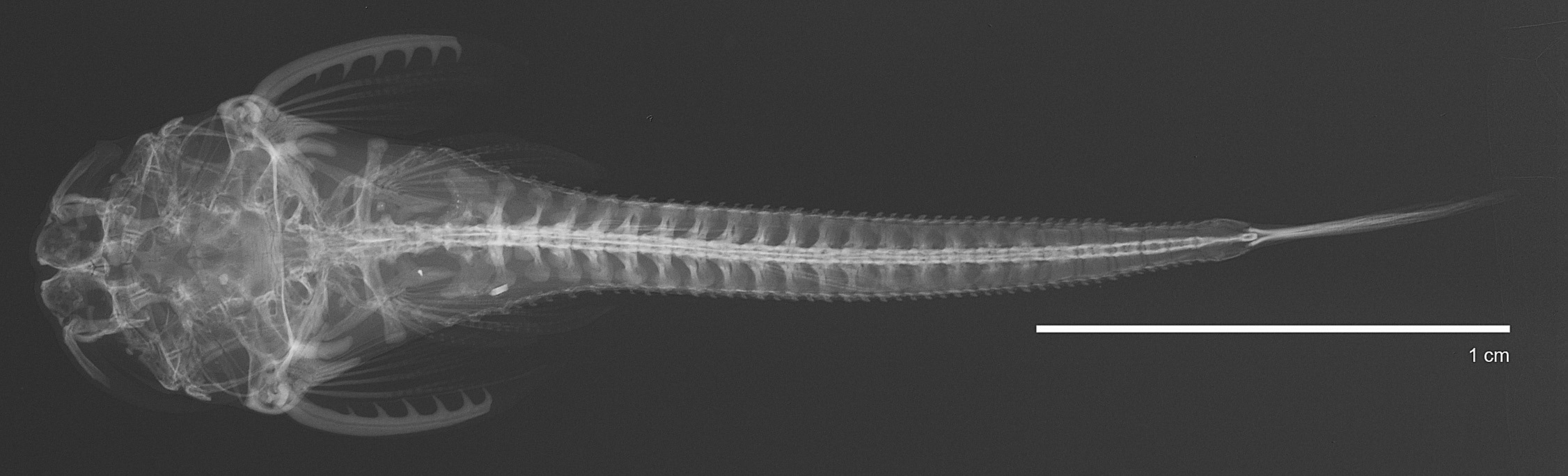

Conservation status
- Vulnerable (IUCN 3.1)

Scientific classification
- Kingdom: Animalia
- Phylum: Chordata
- Class: Actinopterygii
- Order: Siluriformes
- Family: Aspredinidae
- Genus: Hoplomyzon
- Species: H. atrizona

Binomial name
- Hoplomyzon atrizona G. S. Myers, 1942

= Hoplomyzon atrizona =

Species of fish

Hoplomyzon atrizona is a species of banjo catfish endemic to the Lake Maracaibo basin in Venezuela. It grows to a length of 2.7 cm (1.1 in).

== Taxonomy ==
Hoplomyzon atrizona was described in 1942 by the American ichthyologist George S. Myers on the basis of a specimen collected from a tributary of the Río Zulia in the Venzuelan state of Táchira, at Estacion Tachira, 60 km north of San Cristóbal. Schultz described the subspecies petroleus in 1944 based on two specimens from the Río Motatán in the Maracaibo Basin, but other authorities have contended that these specimens exhibit only slight differences in pigmentation compared to the nominate, and therefore the validity of petroleus is needs further study.

== Description ==
Hoplomyzon atrizona can be told apart from other aspredinids by the presence of four stout papillae on the upper lip and from other species within Bunocephalinae due to its rather elongated and thin rictal barbel and dorsal-fin rays. Compared to Hoplomyzon papillatus, it has only two pairs of mental barbels.

== Distribution ==
The catfish is known from the basin of Lake Maracaibo in Venezuela and Colombia, inhabiting fast-moving waters in the Andean foothills and the upper reaches of rivers. It has also been reported from the Guiana Shield, but records from this region are unconfirmed and need further investigation. The species prefers fast-flowing water-bodies with clear waters and sandy bottoms. It may feed on insect larvae. It is likely to be nocturnal and non-migratory.

== Conservation ==
The species is not very common within its range and is classified as being vulnerable on the IUCN Red List. Although it is not hunted by humans, it is vulnerable to habitat loss; pollution, cattle ranching, and agriculture within the Maracaibo basin has led to intensive habitat degradation within the species' range.
