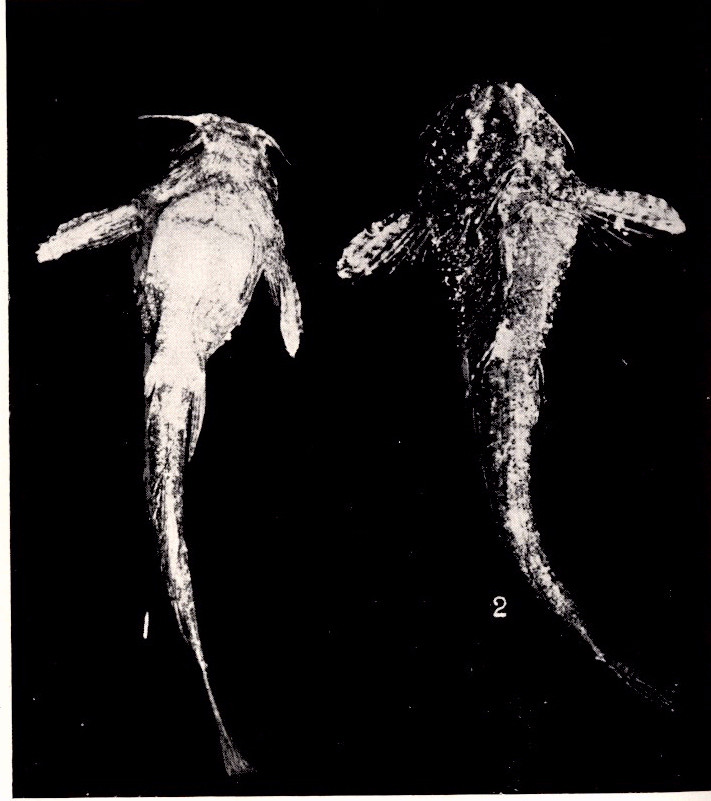
- Ventral and dorsal views

Scientific classification
- Kingdom: Animalia
- Phylum: Chordata
- Class: Actinopterygii
- Division: Teleostei
- Order: Siluriformes
- Family: Aspredinidae
- Subfamily: Pseudobunocephalinae
- Genus: Pseudobunocephalus; Friel, 2008

Type species
- Pseudobunocephalus lundbergi Friel, 2008

Species
- See text

= Pseudobunocephalus =

Genus of fishes

Pseudobunocephalus is a genus of banjo catfishes.

== Taxonomy ==
The species of Pseudobunocephalus were originally classified in the genus Bunocephalus, but after further study it was found that these fish were unrelated to the type species Bunocephalus verrucosus or any of the other existing aspredinid genera. Thus, a new genus was described in 2008.

Pseudobunocephalus is the most basal genus in the family, and represents the sister group to all other Aspredinidae. P. lundbergi is also the most basal species and is the sister taxon to the rest of the species in the genus.

== Species ==
There are currently six species in this genus:

- Pseudobunocephalus amazonicus (Mees, 1989)
- Pseudobunocephalus bifidus (C. H. Eigenmann, 1942)
- Pseudobunocephalus iheringii (Boulenger, 1891)
- Pseudobunocephalus lundbergi Friel, 2008
- Pseudobunocephalus quadriradiatus (Mees, 1989)
- Pseudobunocephalus rugosus (C. H. Eigenmann & C. H. Kennedy, 1903)

== Distribution ==
Pseudobunocephalus species are widespread in the Amazon, Orinoco, and Paraguay-Paraná River basins.

== Description ==
Species of Pseudobunocephalus are small, all of them reaching less than 80 millimetres (3.1 in) SL. They are often mistaken at first glance with juvenile Bunocephalus species.
