= Aspredinichthys filamentosus =

Conservation status
- Least Concern (IUCN 3.1)

Scientific classification
- Kingdom: Animalia
- Phylum: Chordata
- Class: Actinopterygii
- Order: Siluriformes
- Family: Aspredinidae
- Genus: Aspredinichthys
- Species: A. filamentosus

Binomial name
- Aspredinichthys filamentosus (Valenciennes in Cuvier and Valenciennes, 1840)

Species of fish

Aspredinichthys filamentosus, the sevenbarbed banjo, is a species of banjo catfish found in coastal brackish waters and coastal rivers in South America from Venezuela to Brazil including the island nation of Trinidad and Tobago. The species practices an unusual method of incubation of the eggs, attaching them to the underside of the female who then carries them around.
