= Liobagrus hyeongsanensis =

Scientific classification
- Domain: Eukaryota
- Kingdom: Animalia
- Phylum: Chordata
- Class: Actinopterygii
- Order: Siluriformes
- Family: Amblycipitidae
- Genus: Liobagrus
- Species: L. hyeongsanensis

Binomial name
- Liobagrus hyeongsanensis S. H. Kim, H. S. Kim & J. Y. Park, 2015

Species of fish

Liobagrus hyeongsanensis is a species of catfish in the family Amblycipitidae (the torrent catfishes) endemic to South Korea.
