= Liobagrus anguillicauda =

Scientific classification
- Kingdom: Animalia
- Phylum: Chordata
- Class: Actinopterygii
- Order: Siluriformes
- Family: Amblycipitidae
- Genus: Liobagrus
- Species: L. anguillicauda

Binomial name
- Liobagrus anguillicauda Nichols, 1926

Species of fish

Liobagrus anguillicauda is a species of catfish in the family Amblycipitidae (the torrent catfishes) endemic to the province of Fujian in China. This species reaches a length of 10 centimetres (3.9 in) TL.
