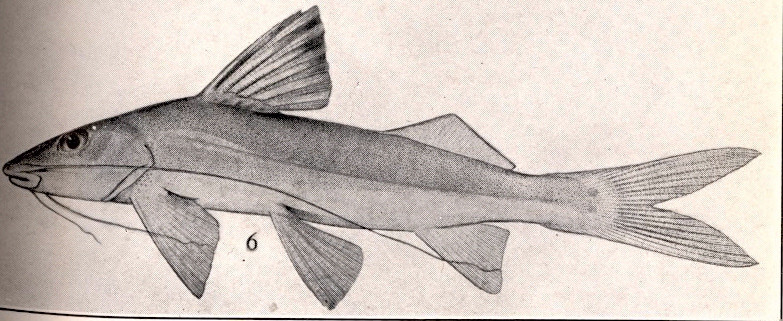
- Megalonema platycephalum

Scientific classification
- Kingdom: Animalia
- Phylum: Chordata
- Class: Actinopterygii
- Order: Siluriformes
- Family: Pimelodidae
- Genus: Megalonema; C. H. Eigenmann, 1912

Type species
- Megalonema platycephalum Eigenmann, 1912

= Megalonema =

Genus of fishes

Megalonema is a genus of long-whiskered catfishes native to South America.

== Species ==
There are currently seven recognized species in this genus:

- Megalonema amaxanthum Lundberg & Dahdul, 2008
- Megalonema orixanthum Lundberg & Dahdul, 2008
- Megalonema pauciradiatum C. H. Eigenmann, 1919
- Megalonema platanum (Günther, 1880)
- Megalonema platycephalum C. H. Eigenmann, 1912
- Megalonema psammium Schultz, 1944
- Megalonema xanthum C. H. Eigenmann, 1912
