= Xyliphius lepturus =

Conservation status
- Least Concern (IUCN 3.1)

Scientific classification
- Kingdom: Animalia
- Phylum: Chordata
- Class: Actinopterygii
- Division: Teleostei
- Order: Siluriformes
- Family: Aspredinidae
- Genus: Xyliphius
- Species: X. lepturus

Binomial name
- Xyliphius lepturus Orcés-V. (es), 1962

Species of fish

Xyliphius lepturus is a species of banjo catfish found in Colombia, Ecuador and Venezuela where it can be found in the upper Amazon and Orinoco River basins. Lacking an English common name, it sometimes referred to as the Carachita in Spanish.

== Description ==
Like many members of its genus, X. lepturus have heads that are approximately as wide as they are long- a trait typical of other Banjo catfish species. The depth of the fish's body is about equal to its width at the vent, while the depth is about half of the body width across the pectoral fins. Its eyes are extremely small compared to other catfishes, and there are only two pairs of barbels. X. lepturus grows to a length of 13 cm (5.1 in).

== Distribution and habitat ==
X. lepturus is demersal and is found in inland waterways and wetlands across its, generally unfragmented habitat. Its range is localized to waters in the piedmont portion of the Andes mountain range, where it lives year-round.

== Relationship with humans ==
While conservation issues do exist in X. lepturus' range which may threaten it, this species is considered of least concern by the IUCN. While it is not known whether its population is in decline, threats to its habitat include oil and gas drilling, wastewater from urban centers, agricultural production, road and railroad runoff, and land use changes in the drainage basin that are related to the above activities. The creation of dams may also negatively impact this species' habitat.
