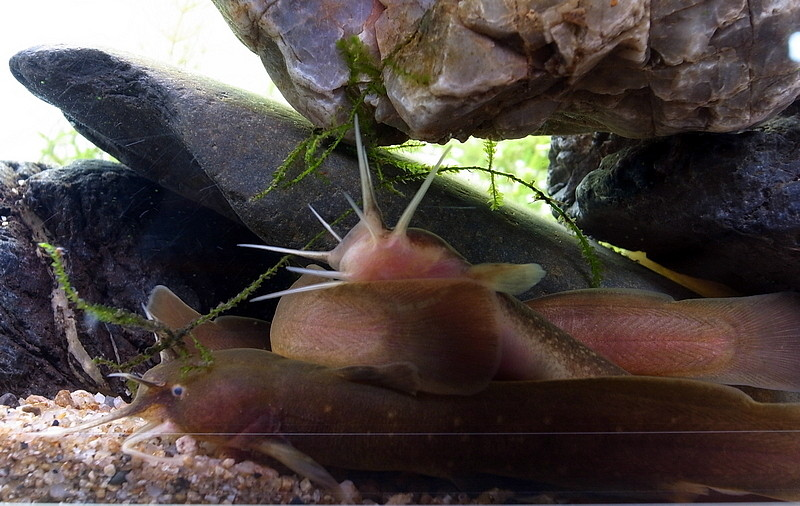

Scientific classification
- Domain: Eukaryota
- Kingdom: Animalia
- Phylum: Chordata
- Class: Actinopterygii
- Order: Siluriformes
- Family: Amblycipitidae
- Genus: Liobagrus
- Species: L. reinii

Binomial name
- Liobagrus reinii Hilgendorf, 1878

= Liobagrus reinii =

Species of fish

Liobagrus reinii is a species of catfish in the family Amblycipitidae (the torrent catfishes) endemic to Japan. This species reaches a length of 9 centimetres (3.5 in).

== Habitat and ecology ==
L. reinii lives under cobbles and boulders, in bedrock crevices, and in clumps of roots of terrestrial vegetation along banks.
