= Liobagrus somjinensis =

Scientific classification
- Domain: Eukaryota
- Kingdom: Animalia
- Phylum: Chordata
- Class: Actinopterygii
- Order: Siluriformes
- Family: Amblycipitidae
- Genus: Liobagrus
- Species: L. somjinensis

Binomial name
- Liobagrus somjinensis Park & Kim 2011 "2010"

Species of fish

Liobagrus somjinensis is a species of catfish in the family Amblycipitidae (the torrent catfishes). It is known from the western and southern coasts of Korea and Geogeum Island, where it has been found in rivers and tributaries. L. somjinensis can be distinguished physically from other torrent catfish by the unusual length of its dorsal spine and outer mental barbel (7.3–12.4 % of SL and 15.3–21.6 % of SL respectively) and the shortness of the distance from its dorsal-fin insertion point to its adipose-fin point of origin (13.5–22.0 % of SL), as well as by markings and coloration on the fins. The caudal fin displays a broad vertical band in its center, yellow in hue and shaped like a crescent, while the dorsal, anal, and caudal fins have deep black colour on their outer margins. It grows to 10.1 cm (4.0 in) standard length.
