= Liobagrus formosanus =

Scientific classification
- Domain: Eukaryota
- Kingdom: Animalia
- Phylum: Chordata
- Class: Actinopterygii
- Order: Siluriformes
- Family: Amblycipitidae
- Genus: Liobagrus
- Species: L. formosanus

Binomial name
- Liobagrus formosanus Regan, 1908

Synonyms
- Liobagrus nantoensis Oshima, 1919

Species of fish

Liobagrus formosanus is a species of catfish in the family Amblycipitidae (the torrent catfishes). It is endemic to Taiwan. This species reaches a maximum length of 8.6 centimetres (3.4 in) standard length.
