= Liobagrus marginatus =

Scientific classification
- Kingdom: Animalia
- Phylum: Chordata
- Class: Actinopterygii
- Order: Siluriformes
- Family: Amblycipitidae
- Genus: Liobagrus
- Species: L. marginatus

Binomial name
- Liobagrus marginatus (Günther, 1892)

Synonyms
- Amblyceps marginatus Günther, 1892

Species of fish

Liobagrus marginatus is a species of catfish in the family Amblycipitidae (the torrent catfishes) endemic to the province of Sichuan in China. This species reaches a length of 14 centimetres (5.5 in) TL.
