= Acanthobunocephalus =

Scientific classification
- Kingdom: Animalia
- Phylum: Chordata
- Class: Actinopterygii
- Order: Siluriformes
- Family: Aspredinidae
- Subfamily: Pseudobunocephalinae
- Genus: Acanthobunocephalus; Friel, 1995

Species
- A. nicoi Friel, 1995; A. scruggsi Carvalho & Reis, 2020

Genus of fish

Acanthobunocephalus is a genus of fishes in the family Aspredinidae found in South America.

The genus was formerly monotypic, featuring only A. nicoi.
