= Amaralia =

Scientific classification
- Kingdom: Animalia
- Phylum: Chordata
- Class: Actinopterygii
- Order: Siluriformes
- Family: Aspredinidae
- Subfamily: Aspredininae
- Genus: Amaralia; Fowler, 1954

Type species
- Bunocephalus hypsiurus Kner, 1855

Genus of catfish

Amaralia is a genus of catfish of the family Aspredinidae native to Amazon and Paraná-Paraguay basin. These species appear to be specialized to feed on the eggs of other catfishes; eggs found in Amaralia stomachs are thought to be those of loricariids.

== Species ==
There are currently 2 recognized species in this genus:

- Amaralia hypsiura (Kner, 1855)
- Amaralia oviraptor Friel & Carvalho, 2016
