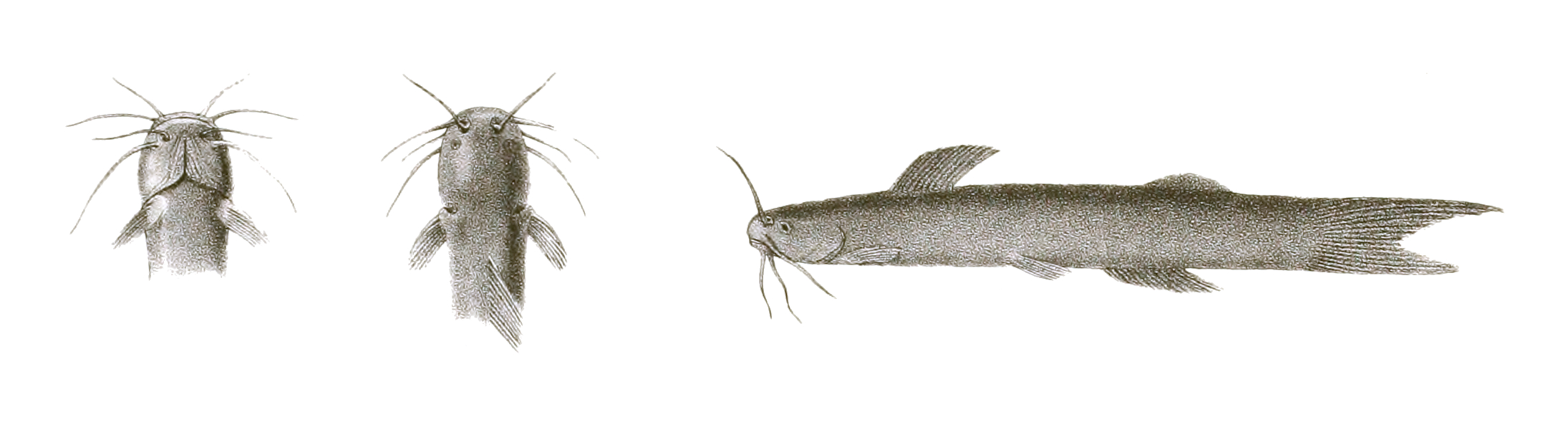
- Amblyceps mangois

Scientific classification
- Kingdom: Animalia
- Phylum: Chordata
- Class: Actinopterygii
- Order: Siluriformes
- Family: Amblycipitidae
- Genus: Amblyceps; Blyth, 1858

Type species
- Amblyceps caecutiens Blyth, 1858

Synonyms
- Branchiosteus Gill, 1861

= Amblyceps =

Genus of fishes

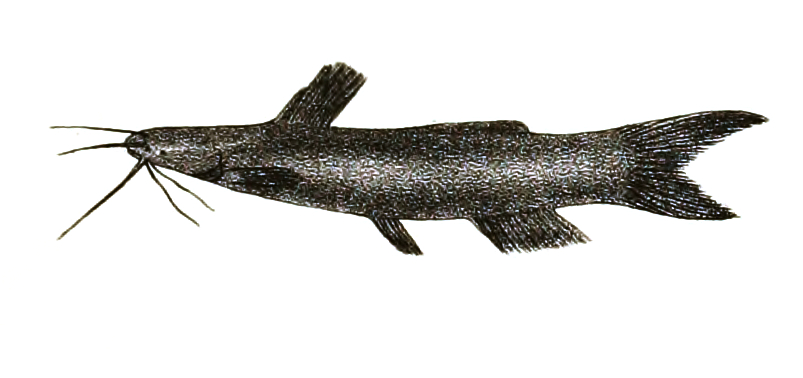
Amblyceps

Amblyceps is a genus of fish in the family Amblycipitidae. The genera Amblyceps and Liobagrus are sister group pair that is, in turn, sister to Xiurenbagrus. These species are easily distinguished by the presence of pinnate processes along with the median caudal-fin rays (although these processes may be poorly developed in some species), a prominent cup-like skin flap above the base of the pectoral spine, and the adipose fin largely separate from the caudal fin. In most species the caudal fin is deeply forked; A. apangi and A. murraystuarti differ in having their caudal fin truncate. Amblyceps species may reach about 100 millimetres (3.9 in) SL.

== Distribution and habitat ==
These species are distributed throughout south and southeast Asia. They typically inhabit fast flowing hill streams or fast-flowing stretches of larger rivers. This genus is mainly distributed in India and the Malay Peninsula. Three species are known from Myanmar: A. caecutiens, A. murraystuarti and A. carinatum.

== Species ==
These are the currently recognized species in this genus:

- Amblyceps accari Dahanukar, Raghavan, A. Ali & Britz, 2016
- Amblyceps apangi Nath & S. C. Dey, 1989
- Amblyceps arunachalensis Nath & S. C. Dey, 1989
- Amblyceps caecutiens Blyth, 1858
- Amblyceps carinatum H. H. Ng, 2005
- Amblyceps cerinum H. H. Ng & J. J. Wright, 2010
- Amblyceps crassioris Vijayakrishnan & Praveenraj, 2024
- Amblyceps foratum H. H. Ng & Kottelat, 2000
- Amblyceps hmolaii Singh, Lalronunga & Ramliana, 2022
- Amblyceps improcerum Ng & Kottelat, 2018
- Amblyceps kurzii (F. Day, 1872)
- Amblyceps laticeps (McClelland, 1842)
- Amblyceps macropterus H. H. Ng, 2001
- Amblyceps mangois (F. Hamilton, 1822) (Indian torrent catfish)
- Amblyceps murraystuarti B. L. Chaudhuri, 1919
- Amblyceps platycephalus H. H. Ng & Kottelat, 2000
- Amblyceps protentum H. H. Ng & J. J. Wright, 2009
- Amblyceps serratum H. H. Ng & Kottelat, 2000
- Amblyceps tenuispinis Blyth, 1860
- Amblyceps torrentis Linthoingambi & Vishwanath, 2008
- Amblyceps tuberculatum Linthoingambi & Vishwanath, 2008
- Amblyceps variegatum H. H. Ng & Kottelat, 2000
- Amblyceps vayavy Vijayakrishnan, B., Thackeray, T. & Shirke, A., 2026
- Amblyceps waikhomi Darshan, Kachari, Dutta, Ganguly & D. N. Das, 2016
- Amblyceps yunnanensis X. Y. Zhang, Y. Long, H. Xiao & Z. M. Chen, 2016
