= Hoplomyzon papillatus =

Conservation status
- Data Deficient (IUCN 3.1)

Scientific classification
- Kingdom: Animalia
- Phylum: Chordata
- Class: Actinopterygii
- Order: Siluriformes
- Family: Aspredinidae
- Genus: Hoplomyzon
- Species: H. papillatus

Binomial name
- Hoplomyzon papillatus D. J. Stewart, 1985

Species of fish

Hoplomyzon papillatus is a species of banjo catfish found in Ecuador and Venezuela where it occurs in the Napo and Portuguesa River basins respectively. It grows to a length of 1.7 cm (0.67 in).

== Taxonomy ==
Hoplomyzon papillatus was described in 1942 by the American ichthyologist Donald J. Stewart on the basis of a specimen collected from the Río Aguarico, slightly upstream of its confluence with the Río Shushufindi, in Ecuador's Napo Province. It is named after the many papillae-like mental barbels it possesses.

== Description ==
Hoplomyzon papillatus is a very small catfish, growing to a maximum size of 1.7 cm (0.67 in). It is generally olive brown to dark gray in color, with the maxillary and mental barbels, pelvic fins, anal fin, and the edges of the pectoral and caudal fins being a contrasting beige or sandy color. The upper side of the snout, the front of the head, and a band across the back of the neck are also beige to sandy.

== Distribution and habitat ==
The species is endemic to the drainage basin of the Napo River in Ecuador. It was previously thought to also inhabit Colombia and Venezuela, but records of the species from those countries are probably misidentified individuals of H. sexpapilostoma. The fish inhabits shallow waters with slow or moderate currents, burying itself into the river bottom, where it feeds on invertebrates.

== Conservation ==
The species is not very commonly recorded and is classified as being data-deficient on the IUCN Red List. Although the species' range is impacted by oil production, banjo catfishes are in general hard to find and collect, leading to an inability to assess whether the catfish is rare or undersampled.
