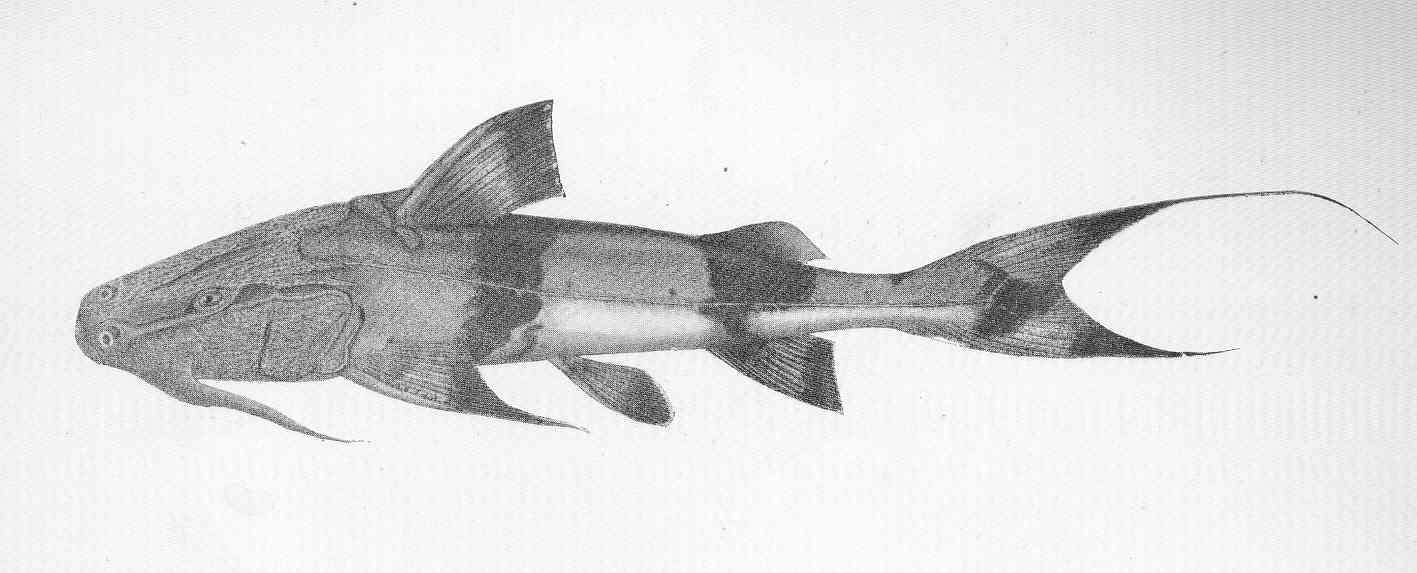
- Bagarius yarrelli

Scientific classification
- Kingdom: Animalia
- Phylum: Chordata
- Class: Actinopterygii
- Division: Teleostei
- Order: Siluriformes
- Superfamily: Sisoroidea

Families
- Akysidae; Amblycipitidae (Aspredinidae); Erethistidae; Sisoridae

= Sisoroidea =

Superfamily of fishes

Sisoroidea is a superfamily of catfishes (order Siluriformes). It contains the four families Amblycipitidae, Akysidae, Sisoridae, and Erethistidae; many sources also include Aspredinidae. With Aspredinidae, this superfamily includes about 42 genera and 230 species.

== Taxonomy ==
Sisoroidea is sister to the Loricarioidea. The monophyly of this superfamily is supported by a number of morphological characters. Amblycipitidae is the most basal family and is sister to the remaining families. Based on morphological data, Erethistidae is the sister group to Aspredinidae, with Sisoridae being the sister group of the clade formed by these two families. However, it has been proposed to move the erethistid genera back into Sisoridae. Also, some authors have removed Aspredinidae from Sisoroidea, having found it to be more closely related to Doradoidea (Doradidae, Auchenipteridae, and possibly Mochokidae) with morphological and molecular evidence.

== Distribution ==
Sisoroidea includes almost exclusively Asiatic catfish families with the exception of Aspredinidae, which is native to South America.
