= Xyliphius =

Scientific classification
- Kingdom: Animalia
- Phylum: Chordata
- Class: Actinopterygii
- Order: Siluriformes
- Family: Aspredinidae
- Subfamily: Aspredininae
- Genus: Xyliphius; C. H. Eigenmann, 1912

Type species
- Xyliphius magdalenae C. H. Eigenmann, 1912

Genus of fishes

Xyliphius is a genus of banjo catfishes from South America.

This genus appears to be widespread in the Magdalena, Orinoco, Amazon, and Paraguay-Paraná River systems where they are most common in deeper waters.

Xyliphius includes moderately sized aspredinids, ranging from 8.8–14.7 cm (3.5–5.8 in) SL. Species of this genus are distinguished from all other aspredinids by having highly reduced eyes, toothless premaxillae, a row of fleshy papillae projecting anteriorly off the lower lip, flattened unculi and unculiferous tubercles flattened. These species also have the openings of the anterior nares with papillae and no dark saddles on the body.

== Species ==
There are currently seven described species in this genus:

- Xyliphius anachoretes C. A. A. de Figueiredo & Britto, 2010
- Xyliphius barbatus Alonso de Arámburu & Arámburu, 1962
- Xyliphius kryptos Taphorn & Lilyestrom, 1983
- Xyliphius lepturus Orcés-V. (es), 1962
- Xyliphius magdalenae C. H. Eigenmann, 1912
- Xyliphius melanopterus Orcés-V. (es), 1962
- Xyliphius sofiae Sabaj Pérez, Carvalho & Reis, 2017

Synonyms

- Xyliphius lombarderoi F. J. J. Risso & E. N. P. de Risso, 1964; valid as X. barbatus
