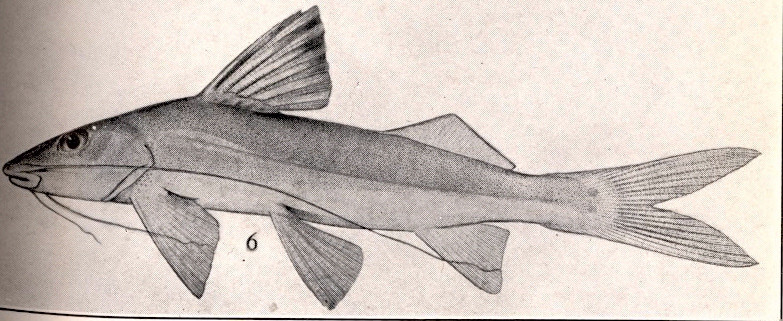

Conservation status
- Least Concern (IUCN 3.1)

Scientific classification
- Kingdom: Animalia
- Phylum: Chordata
- Class: Actinopterygii
- Division: Teleostei
- Order: Siluriformes
- Family: Pimelodidae
- Genus: Megalonema
- Species: M. platycephalum

Binomial name
- Megalonema platycephalum Eigenmann, 1912

= Megalonema platycephalum =

Species of catfish

Megalonema platycephalum, known in Spanish as the ballito, ballo, or barbudo, is a species of long-whiskered catfish in the genus Megalonema found in rivers of North and Central South America.
