= Hoplomyzon sexpapilostoma =

Conservation status
- Least Concern (IUCN 3.1)

Scientific classification
- Kingdom: Animalia
- Phylum: Chordata
- Class: Actinopterygii
- Order: Siluriformes
- Family: Aspredinidae
- Genus: Hoplomyzon
- Species: H. sexpapilostoma

Binomial name
- Hoplomyzon sexpapilostoma Taphorn & Marrero, 1990

Species of fish

Hoplomyzon sexpapilostoma is a species of banjo catfish endemic to Venezuela where it is found in the Orinoco River basin. It is the giant of the genus reaching a length of 3.2 cm (1.3 in).
