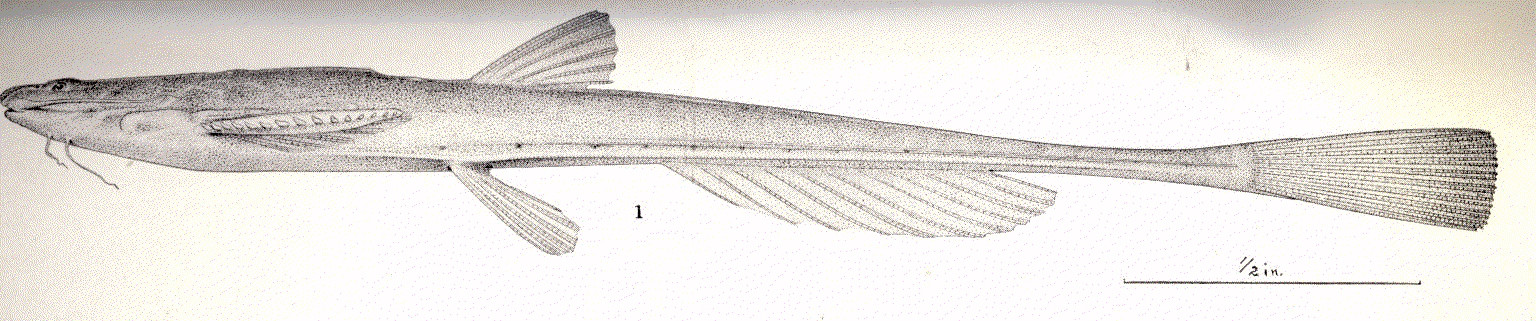
- Pterobunocephalus depressus

Scientific classification
- Kingdom: Animalia
- Phylum: Chordata
- Class: Actinopterygii
- Division: Teleostei
- Order: Siluriformes
- Family: Aspredinidae
- Subfamily: Aspredininae
- Genus: Pterobunocephalus; Fowler, 1943

Type species
- Bunocephalus albifasciatus Fowler, 1943

Synonyms
- Petacara Böhlke, 1959

= Pterobunocephalus =

Genus of fishes

Pterobunocephalus is a genus of banjo catfishes found in tropical South America.

== Distribution ==
The genus is widespread in the Orinoco, Amazon and Paraguay-Paraná River systems and typically occur at depths greater than 5 metres.

== Description ==
Pterobunocephalus is genus of small to medium-sized aspredinid species. Members of this genus are distinguished from all other aspredinids by the following characters having an extremely depressed (flattened) head and body, having the head ornamentation highly reduced or absent, often having a distinct notch in the upper jaw, and having 10–20 anal fin rays. Females of this genus carry embryos directly attached to the ventral surface of their bodies, which also distinguishes them from all other aspredinids.

== Species ==
There are currently three described species in this genus. A list of them can be found below:

- Pterobunocephalus depressus (Haseman, 1911)
- Pterobunocephalus dolichurus (Delsman, 1941)
- Pterobunocephalus carvalhoi Crispim, Argüello, Silva, Oliveira, Luckenbill & Sabaj, 2026
