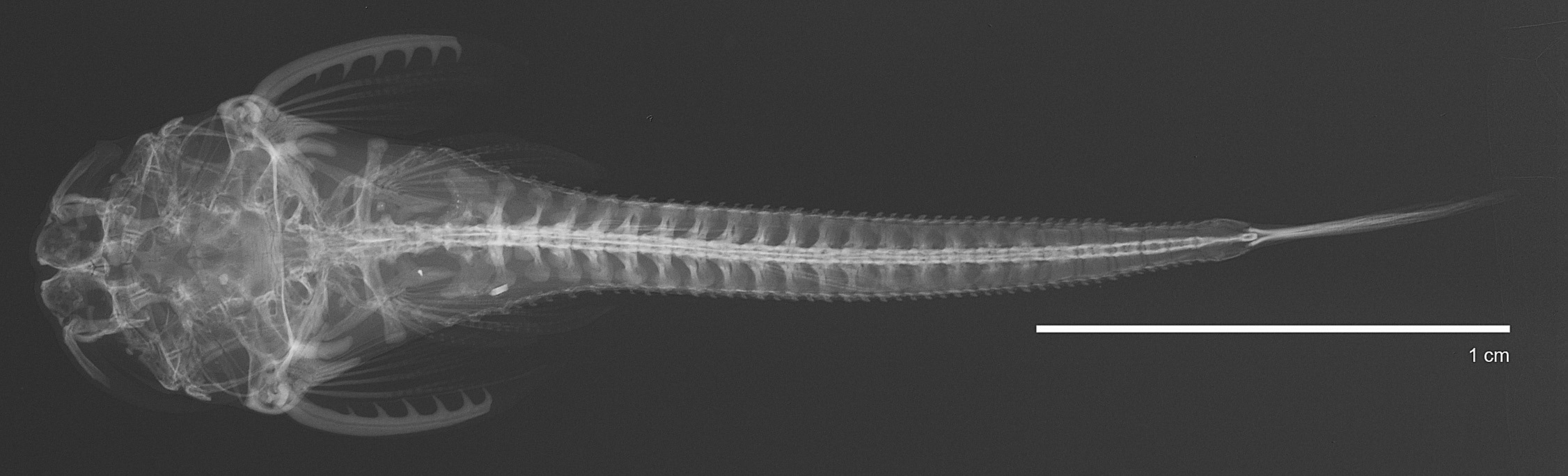

Scientific classification
- Kingdom: Animalia
- Phylum: Chordata
- Class: Actinopterygii
- Order: Siluriformes
- Family: Aspredinidae
- Subfamily: Hoplomyzontinae
- Genus: Hoplomyzon; G. S. Myers, 1942

Type species
- Hoplomyzon atrizona G. S. Myers, 1942

= Hoplomyzon =

Genus of fishes

Hoplomyzon is a genus of banjo catfishes that are native to tropical South America.

Hoplomyzon species are small, armoured aspredinids, growing up to 32 millimetres (1.3 in) SL in H. sexpapilostoma. Members of this genus are distinguished from all other aspredinids by having each premaxilla with two bony knobs superficially covered by fleshy papillae, the dorsal and ventral armor plates not overlapping, and 2–3 sets of paired pre-anal-fin plates. They also have the maxillary barbels adnate with the head and the pectoral spine less than one-quarter of the fish's standard length.

== Species ==
There are currently four described species in this genus:

- Hoplomyzon atrizona G. S. Myers, 1942
- Hoplomyzon cardosoi Carvalho, Reis & Friel, 2017
- Hoplomyzon papillatus D. J. Stewart, 1985
- Hoplomyzon sexpapilostoma Taphorn & Marrero, 1990

There are also at least two undescribed species, including a blind and unpigmented species.
