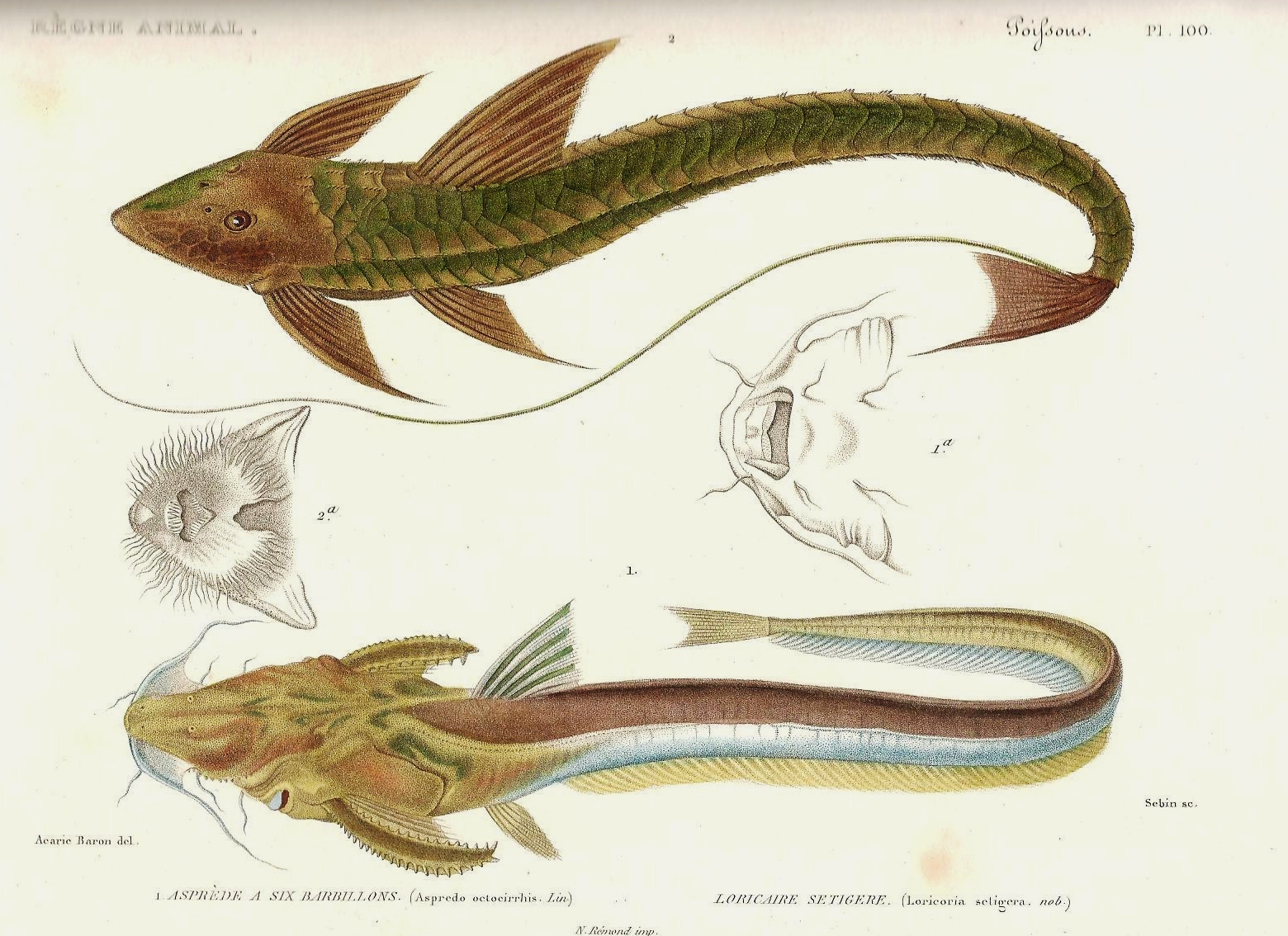

Conservation status
- Least Concern (IUCN 3.1)

Scientific classification
- Kingdom: Animalia
- Phylum: Chordata
- Class: Actinopterygii
- Order: Siluriformes
- Family: Aspredinidae
- Subfamily: Aspredininae
- Genus: Aspredo; Scopoli, 1777
- Species: A. aspredo

Binomial name
- Aspredo aspredo (Linnaeus, 1758)

Synonyms
- Silurus aspredo Linnaeus, 1758; Platystacus laevis Bloch, 1794; Aspredo sicuephorus Valenciennes, in Cuvier & Valenciennes, 1840; Aspredo batrachus Gronow, in Gray, 1854; Aspredo sicyephorus Günther, 1864

= Aspredo =

Genus of fishes

Aspredo aspredo is the only species of banjo catfish (order Siluriformes) in the genus Aspredo.

This species originates from the lower portions of rivers from Venezuela to northern Brazil. It occurs in the Orinoco delta, through the Guianas, to the Amazon River to the island of Trinidad.

A. aspredo is the largest species of aspredinid, reaching about 38.3 centimetres (15.1 in) SL. The maxillary barbels are attached to the head, the colouration is uniform without any pattern of dark saddles, and the unculiferous tubercles present in other aspredinids are highly reduced.

A. aspredo is a benthic fish that is found on sandy-muddy bottoms in turbid waters in coastal river mouths where it can be found in brackish waters. However, it appears to enter further into fresh water than its relatives. This species practices an unusual method of incubation of the eggs, attaching them to the underside of the female who then carries them around. Reproduction is believed to occur in the early part of the year.
