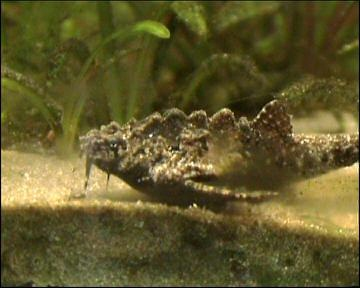
- Bunocephalus verrucosus

Scientific classification
- Kingdom: Animalia
- Phylum: Chordata
- Class: Actinopterygii
- Division: Teleostei
- Order: Siluriformes
- Family: Aspredinidae
- Subfamily: Aspredininae
- Genus: Bunocephalus; Kner, 1855

Type species
- Platystacus verrucosus Walbaum, 1792

Synonyms
- Agmus Eigenmann, 1910; Aspredo Swainson, 1838; Dysichthys Cope, 1874; Platystacus Bleeker, 1858

= Bunocephalus =

Genus of fishes

Bunocephalus is a genus of banjo catfishes from South America. It is found in Magdalena, Orinoco, Amazon, Paraguay-Paraná, and São Francisco Rivers. It is also the only aspredinid genus found west of the Andes, found in the Atrato, San Juan, and Patía Rivers. This genus is a part of the family Aspredinidae, known as banjo catfishes for their large, flattened heads and slender tails that give the appearance of a banjo. Most species exhibit cryptic coloration, and the same holds true among Bunocephalus species. The skin is completely keratinized and is covered by large, unculiferous tubercles. Bunocephalus species may reach up to 13 centimetres (5.1 in) SL.

== Species ==
There are currently 14 recognized species in this genus:

- Bunocephalus aleuropsis Cope, 1870
- Bunocephalus aloikae Hoedeman, 1961
- Bunocephalus amaurus C. H. Eigenmann, 1912 (Camouflaged catfish)
- Bunocephalus chamaizelus C. H. Eigenmann, 1912
- Bunocephalus colombianus C. H. Eigenmann, 1912
- Bunocephalus coracoideus (Cope, 1874) (Guitarrita)
- Bunocephalus doriae Boulenger, 1902
- Bunocephalus erondinae A. R. Cardoso, 2010
- Bunocephalus hartti T. P. Carvalho, A. R. Cardoso, Friel & R. E. dos Reis, 2015
- Bunocephalus hertzi Esguícero, Castro & Pereira, 2020
- Bunocephalus knerii Steindachner, 1882 (Ecuador banjo catfish)
- Bunocephalus larai R. Ihering (pt), 1930
- Bunocephalus minerim T. P. Carvalho, A. R. Cardoso, Friel & R. E. dos Reis, 2015
- Bunocephalus verrucosus (Walbaum, 1792) (Gnarled catfish)

The removal of Pseudobunocephalus from Bunocephalus was an attempt to make it monophyletic. Even in this reduced state, Bunocephalus is still the largest genus in the Aspredinidae.

== In the aquarium ==
B. coracoideus is the most common species of banjo catfish found in the aquarium fishkeeping hobby. These fish are nocturnal. This species is peaceful and a good idea for a community aquarium. These fish may be kept with sand to allow them to bury themselves or with a flat rock to hide underneath. Reproduction has been accomplished in the home aquarium. These fish can be easily sexed because females are much fatter and fuller than males. The mating pair should be conditioned on live foods for at least a month. Spawning is induced by a larger water change; the pair will spawn within two days. Spawning occurs at night. Some sources say they spawn under a fallen leaf or on a large rock, incubating their eggs by sitting on them, while others list them as egg-scatterers.
