= Xiurenbagrus =

Scientific classification
- Kingdom: Animalia
- Phylum: Chordata
- Class: Actinopterygii
- Order: Siluriformes
- Family: Amblycipitidae
- Genus: Xiurenbagrus; Chen & Lundberg, 1995

Type species
- Liobagrus xiurenensis Yue, 1981

Synonyms
- Nahangbagrus Nguyen & Vo, 2006

Genus of fishes

Xiurenbagrus is a genus of torrent catfishes (order Siluriformes) of the family Amblycipitidae. It includes three species.

== Taxonomy ==
X. xiurenensis was first described in 1981 as Liobagrus xiurenensis. However, it was realized that Liobagrus would not be monophyletic with the inclusion of this species, so Xiurenbagrus was erected. The genera Amblyceps and Liobagrus are sister group pair that is, in turn, sister to Xiurenbagrus.

== Species ==
- Xiurenbagrus gigas Zhao, Lan & Zhang, 2004
- Xiurenbagrus songamensis (V. H. Nguyễn & V. B. Vo, 2006)
- Xiurenbagrus xiurenensis (Yue, 1981)

== Distribution ==
X. gigas is known only from the Hongshuihe River which belongs to the Xijiang River, the largest tributary of the Pearl River basin in China. X. xiurenensis inhabits the Pearl River, northward to Lijiang River near Guilin, Guangxi, southward to Zuojiang River near Longzhou, Guangxi.

== Description ==
Xiurenbagrus species have a ventral mouth. The fin margins are pale. The adipose fin is not confluent with the caudal fin and has a free lobe. X. gigas is the largest species of amblycipitid and grows to about 16.5 centimetres (6.5 in) SL. X. xiurenensis is a small- to medium-sized amblycipitid, growing to about 10.7 cm (4.2 in) SL.

== Ecology ==
Little is known about the ecology of these fishes. X. xiurenensis is benthic and inhabits streams in the Nanling mountain range. The stomach contents have been studied to contain parts of arthropods.
