= Aspredinichthys =

Scientific classification
- Kingdom: Animalia
- Phylum: Chordata
- Class: Actinopterygii
- Order: Siluriformes
- Family: Aspredinidae
- Subfamily: Aspredininae
- Genus: Aspredinichthys; Bleeker, 1858

Type species
- Aspredo tibicen Valenciennes, 1840

Synonyms
- Chamaigenes C. H. Eigenmann, 1910

Genus of fishes

Aspredinichthys is a genus of banjo catfishes found in fresh and brackish waters in tropical South America from the Orinoco delta, through the Guianas, to the Amazon delta. Both species are found in lower portions of rivers and in coastal waters of northern South America from Venezuela to northern Brazil where they are benthic fish.

== Description ==
Aspredinichthys species are large aspredinids that grow up to about 22.0 centimetres (8.7 in) SL; they are distinguished from all other aspredinids by the characters including having 8 pectoral-fin rays and several pairs of accessory mental barbels present. The two species placed in this genus are very similar in appearance and are most readily separated by the pattern and number of accessory mental barbels.

== Species ==
There are currently two described species in this genus:

- Aspredinichthys filamentosus (Valenciennes, 1840) (Sevenbarbed banjo)
- Aspredinichthys tibicen (Valenciennes, 1840) (Tenbarbed banjo)
