= Ernstichthys =

Scientific classification
- Kingdom: Animalia
- Phylum: Chordata
- Class: Actinopterygii
- Order: Siluriformes
- Family: Aspredinidae
- Subfamily: Hoplomyzontinae
- Genus: Ernstichthys; Fernández-Yépez, 1953

Type species
- Ernstichthys anduzei Fernández-Yépez, 1953

Genus of fishes

Ernstichthys is a genus of banjo catfishes that occurs in the Amazon and Orinoco basins.

The genus was named in honor of the Chair of Natural Science at the Central University of Venezuela biologist Adolfo (also spelled Adolf) Ernst (1832–1899).

Ernstichthys species are small to medium-sized, armored aspredinids. Members of this genus are distinguished from all other aspredinids by having two sets of paired pre-anal-fin plates and a strongly recurved pectoral spine that is much longer than first branched pectoral-fin ray.

== Species ==
There are currently five described species in this genus:

- Ernstichthys anduzei Fernández-Yépez, 1953
- Ernstichthys casalinuovoi Aguilera, Terán, Méndez-López, Montes & Carvalho, 2025
- Ernstichthys intonsus D. J. Stewart, 1985
- Ernstichthys megistus (Orcés-V. (es), 1961)
- Ernstichthys taquari Dagosta & de Pinna, 2021
