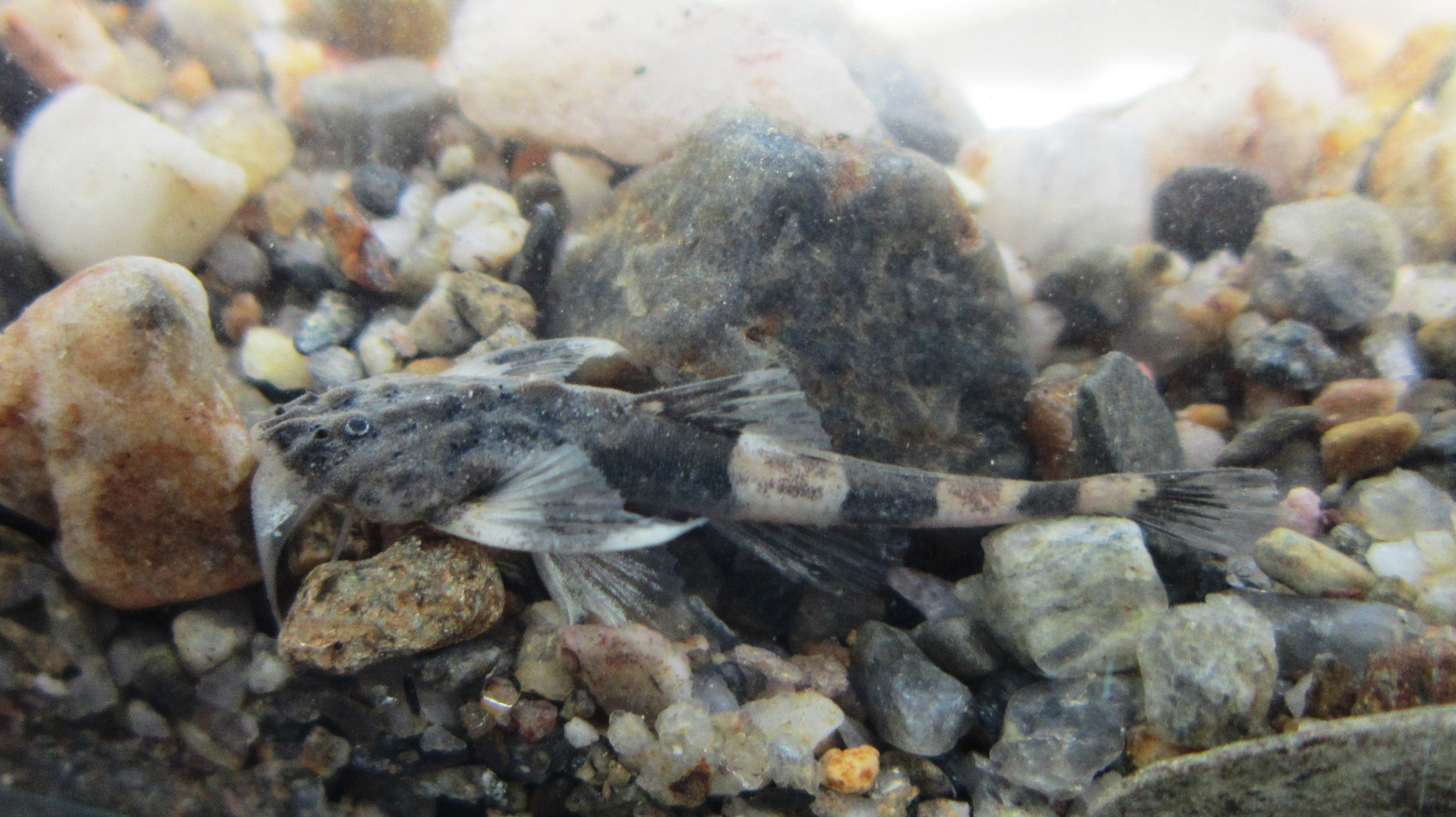

Conservation status
- Least Concern (IUCN 3.1)

Scientific classification
- Kingdom: Animalia
- Phylum: Chordata
- Class: Actinopterygii
- Order: Siluriformes
- Family: Aspredinidae
- Genus: Dupouyichthys; L. P. Schultz, 1944
- Species: D. sapito

Binomial name
- Dupouyichthys sapito L. P. Schultz, 1944

= Dupouyichthys =

Species of fish

Dupouyichthys is genus of banjo catfishes in the family Aspredinidae. It is monotypic, being represented by the single species Dupouyichthys sapito often called the Banjo catfish or Sapito banjo catfish. This species appears to be restricted to the Magdalena and Maracaibo basins. D. sapito is a small, armored aspredinid, growing up to 27 millimetres (1.1 in) standard length (SL), distinguished from all other aspredinids by having only one set of paired pre-anal-fin plates. Also, the bony ornamentation of its skull is better developed than its close relatives. It is found in river banks with vegetation.
