= John G. Lundberg =

American ichthyologist (born 1942)

- Born: John Graham Lundberg; August 31, 1942; United States
- Education: Fairleigh Dickinson University (BS); University of Michigan (PhD)
- Known for: Systematics and evolution of catfishes
- Scientific career
- Fields: Ichthyology
- Workplaces: Duke University; University of Arizona; Academy of Natural Sciences of Drexel University; University of Pennsylvania

John Graham Lundberg (born August 31, 1942) is an American ichthyologist whose research focuses on tropical catfishes, biological systematics, paleobiology, biogeography, and vertebrate morphology. He is chair and curator of the Department of Ichthyology at the Academy of Natural Sciences of Drexel University in Philadelphia.

== Life and career ==
From 1960 to 1964, Lundberg studied zoology at Fairleigh Dickinson University, where he earned a Bachelor of Science degree. He began graduate studies in 1965 at the University of Michigan in Ann Arbor, completing his PhD in 1970 under the supervision of Reeve M. Bailey with a dissertation entitled The evolutionary history of North American catfishes, Family Ictaluridae.

Between 1970 and 1992, Lundberg served as assistant professor, associate professor, and later full professor in the Department of Zoology at Duke University. During 1985–1986, he conducted research at the Universidad Central de Venezuela with support from a Fulbright Fellowship. From 1993 to 1996, he continued teaching at Duke University as a lecturer.

From 1993 to 1999, Lundberg was professor in the Department of Ecology and Evolutionary Biology at the University of Arizona and served as director of the graduate program Analysis of Biological Diversification from 1994 to 1999. Since 1999, he has been chair and curator of the Department of Ichthyology at the Academy of Natural Sciences of Drexel University in Philadelphia. He has also held adjunct professorships at Drexel University and the University of Pennsylvania since 2000.

Lundberg additionally serves as a research associate at the Natural History Museum of Los Angeles County. His research integrates studies of living and fossil fishes and has been supported by multiple grants from the National Science Foundation, including projects on the biota of the Orinoco and Amazon River basins and a global inventory of catfishes.Lundberg published over 90 papers in peer reviewed professional journals throughout his career.

Lundberg taught courses in comparative anatomy, ichthyology, systematic methods, and evolutionary biology. In 2009, he served as president of the American Society of Ichthyologists and Herpetologists and continues to serve on its governing board. At the Academy of Natural Sciences, he curates and expands one of the world’s largest fish collections.

== Eponyms ==
Several fish species have been named in his honor, including Loricaria lundbergi, Microglanis lundbergi, Prietella lundbergi, Pseudobunocephalus lundbergi, Rhabdolichops lundbergi, and Typhlobelus lundbergi.
