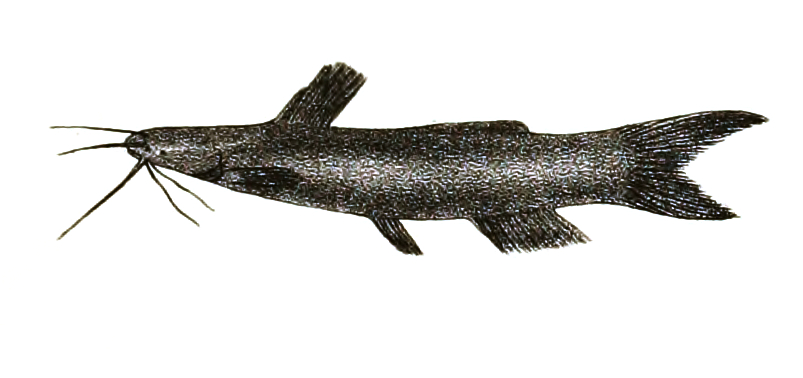
- Amblyceps mangois

Scientific classification
- Kingdom: Animalia
- Phylum: Chordata
- Class: Actinopterygii
- Order: Siluriformes
- Superfamily: Sisoroidea
- Family: Amblycipitidae; Day, 1873

Genera
- Amblyceps Blyth, 1858; Liobagrus Hilgendorf, 1878; Proliobagrus He, Lundberg, Yang & Yang, 2025; Xiurenbagrus Chen & Lundberg, 1995

= Amblycipitidae =

Torrent catfishes

Family of fishes

The Amblycipitidae are a family of catfishes, commonly known as torrent catfishes. It includes four genera, Amblyceps, Liobagrus, Proliobagrus and Xiurenbagrus, and about 50 species.

== Taxonomy ==
The family Amblycipitidae is a monophyletic group containing four monophyletic genera, Amblyceps, Liobagrus, Nahangbagrus and Xiurenbagrus. It is the most basal sisoroid family and is sister to a clade formed by the remaining families. The genera Amblyceps and Liobagrus are a sister group pair that is, in turn, sister to Xiurenbagrus.

== Distribution and habitat ==
These kinds of fishes can be found in swift freshwater streams in southern and eastern Asia, including Pakistan across northern India to Malaysia, China, Korea, and Japan. Amblyceps are mainly distributed in India and the Malay Peninsula. Liobagrus fishes are distributed in the Yangtze River basin, Taiwan, Japan, and the Korean Peninsula. The species of the genus Xiurenbagrus are only distributed in the Pearl River basin.

== Description ==
Fish of this family have dorsal fins covered by skin. An adipose fin is also present, and is fused with the caudal fin in some species. The dorsal fin base is short and the dorsal fin spine is weak. The anal fin base is short. There are six pairs of barbels. The lateral line is poorly developed or absent. Both Amblyceps and Liobagrus species grow to about 10 centimetres (3.9 in) SL.

Liobagrus is more stoutly built than Amblyceps, the nostrils are close together in Amblyceps and distinctly apart in Liobagrus, and Amblyceps species have a cup-like flap above the pectoral fins that is absent in Liobagrus. Also, Amblyceps has double-folded lips and fin margins pigmented differently from the background colour, while Liobagrus has single-folded lips and fin margins paler than the background colour.
