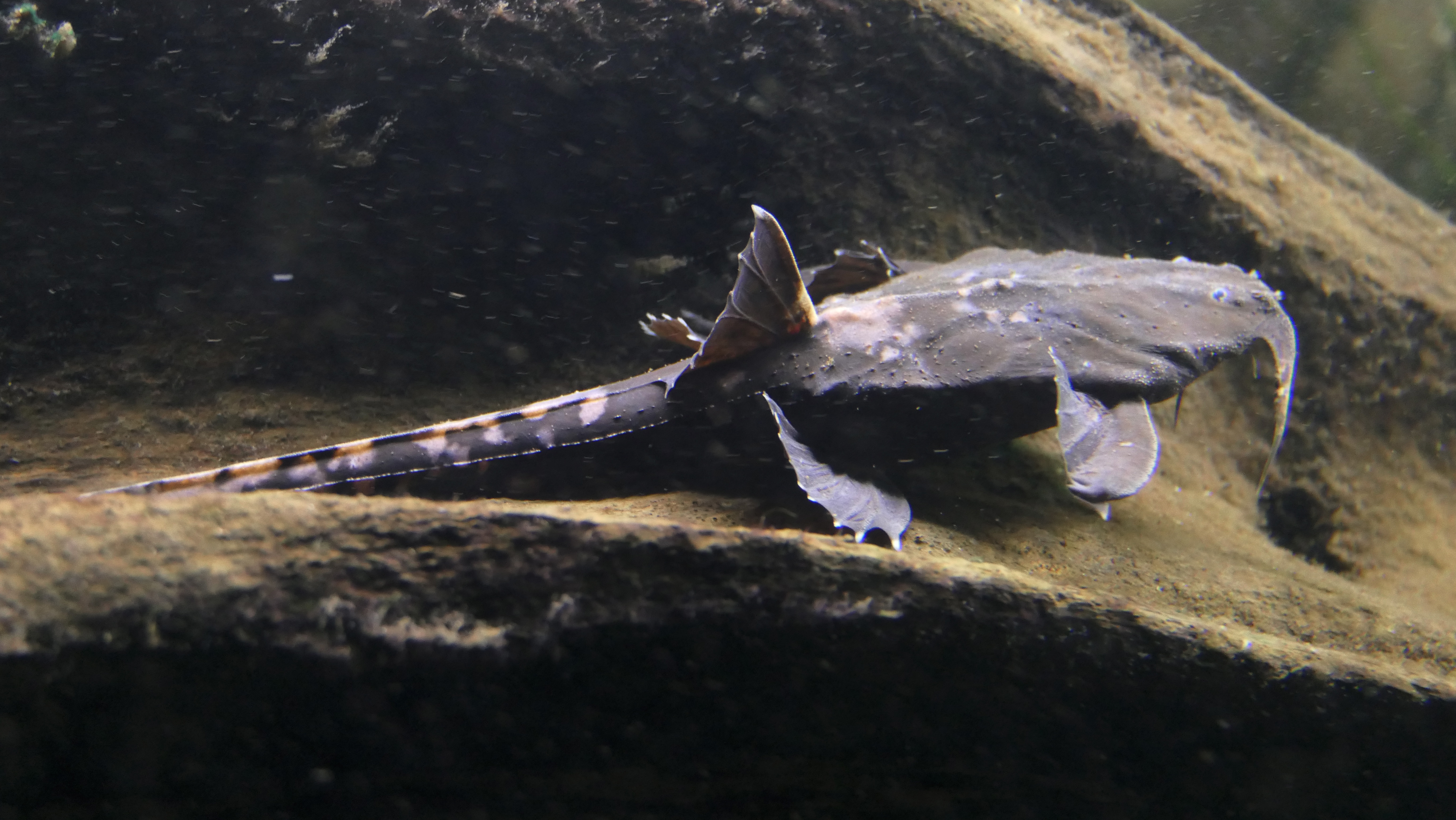
- Platystacus cotylephorus

Scientific classification
- Kingdom: Animalia
- Phylum: Chordata
- Class: Actinopterygii
- Division: Teleostei
- Order: Siluriformes
- Family: Aspredinidae; A. Adams, 1854

Subfamilies and genera
- Subfamily Aspredininae; Amaralia; Aspredinichthys; Aspredo; Bunocephalus; Platystacus; Pterobunocephalus; Xyliphius; Subfamily Hoplomyzontinae; Dupouyichthys; Ernstichthys; Hoplomyzon; Micromyzon; Subfamily Pseudobunocephalinae; Acanthobunocephalus; Pseudobunocephalus

= Aspredinidae =

Banjo catfishes

Family of fishes

The Aspredinidae are a small South American family of catfishes (order Siluriformes) also known as the banjo catfishes, with about 43 species.

== Distribution ==
Aspredinids are found throughout the major tropical rivers of South America (e.g., Magdalena, Orinoco, Amazon, São Francisco, Paraguay-Paraná, and Uruguay. Bunocephalus is the only genus found in rivers west of the Andes including the Atrato, San Juan, and Patía Rivers.

== Taxonomy ==
Of the 13 genera in the family Aspredinidae, a few genera have been described relatively recently, including Acanthobunocephalus in 1995, Micromyzon in 1996, and Pseudobunocephalus in 2008. These genera are categorized into three subfamilies.

The Aspredinidae are often recognized as a part of the primarily Asian superfamily Sisoroidea as the sister group to the family Erethistidae. However, other authors find that they are sister to the superfamily Doradoidea, which includes Doradidae, Auchenipteridae, and perhaps Mochokidae.

== Description ==
The common name of the family "banjo catfishes" refers to their overall body shape, with a depressed head and slender caudal peduncle, that in some species gives the appearance of a banjo. Banjo catfishes lack an adipose fin. Most species lack the dorsal spine-locking mechanism. Though their bodies are scaleless, their skin is completely keratinized and is covered by large, unculiferous tubercles arranged in longitudinal rows; the entire outer layer of skin may be shed. Size ranges from less than 2.0 centimetres (0.79 inches) SL in Hoplomyzon papillatus to Aspredo aspredo at about 38 centimetres (15 inches) SL, though most are less than 15 cm. Most species exhibit cryptic coloration. Aspredinids have a loss of alarm cells and the fright reaction that is present in other ostariophysans.

Sexual dimorphism is exhibited in most species in that mature females are typically larger than males; this is, however, reversed in Hoplomyzon sexpapilostoma. Also, in Aspredo and Platystacus the dorsal fin spine is much longer in males than in females.

== Ecology ==
Aspredinids live in a variety of habitats ranging from shallow backwaters to deep river channels to tidal estuaries. Some aspredinids appear to be semifossorial, during the day often resting slightly buried in leaf litter or other soft substrates. Members of the subfamily Aspredininae inhabit coastal rivers and brackish water habitats such as mangrove swamps.

In general, most species are cryptically pigmented, benthic, and rather sluggish unless disturbed. Like most fish, they are able to swim by undulating their bodies; however, they also propel themselves by pumping water through their gill openings to skip along the substrate. Some species are able to produce sounds by moving their pectoral fin spines back and forth when they are agitated. Most aspredinids are generalized omnivores that feed on aquatic and terrestrial invertebrates and organic debris; however, members of Amaralia appear to specialize in feeding on the eggs of other catfishes.

A peculiarity of the catfishes in the subfamily Aspredininae is that after the female's eggs are fertilised by the male, she attaches them to her belly and carries them to shallow water to hatch. In Pterobunocephalus, the eggs are directly attached to the body, while in the other three genera of the subfamily, the eggs are attached to cotylephores, which are fleshy stalks that develop seasonally on the underside of the body that may function in exchange of materials between the mother and her developing embryos. Because these catfish live in muddy environments, this behaviour has been hypothesised to give the eggs better access to oxygenated water.

Accounts of reproduction in Bunocephalus vary; some sources state that they are egg-scatterers without any parental care, while others note them to build a depression for a nest and guard the eggs.

== In the aquarium ==
A few banjo catfishes are kept as aquarium fish, predominantly the smaller members of the subfamily Aspredininae. Their requirements are similar to those of other tropical South American fish, preferring slightly acidic, not too hard water maintained at 20–25 °C (68–77 °F). Since these species are nocturnal burrowers, they need an aquarium with a soft, sandy substrate into which they hide during the daytime and forage in at night. Sharp sand or coarse gravel will damage their whiskers. Although not schooling fish, they are tolerant of their own kind and also get along with other small aquarium species.

== See also ==
- List of fish families
- List of freshwater aquarium fish species
