= List of invasive species in Asia =

This is a list of invasive species in Asia. A species is regarded as invasive if it has been introduced by human action to a location, area, or region where it did not previously occur naturally (i.e., is not a native species), becomes capable of establishing a breeding population in the new location without further intervention by humans, and becomes a pest in the new location, directly threatening agriculture and/or the local biodiversity.

The term invasive species refers to a subset of those species defined as introduced species. If a species has been introduced but remains local, and is not problematic to agriculture or to the local biodiversity, then it cannot be considered to be an invasive species and does not belong on this list.

== Plants ==
- Eichhornia crassipes (Water hyacinth)
- Limnocharis flava (Yellow burhead)
- Pistia stratiotes (Water lettuce)
- Lantana camara (Common lantana)
- Ageratina adenophora (Crofton weed)
- Epipremnum aureum (Devil's ivy, Pothos)
- Swietenia macrophylla (Mahogany)
- Myroxylon balsamum (Balsam of Peru)
- Spathodea campanulata (African tulip tree)
- Bignonia magnifica (Glow vine)
- Opuntia stricta (Erect prickly pear)
- Clusia rosea (Autograph Tree)
- Panicum maximum (Guinea grass)
- Boerhavia coccinea (Scarlet spiderling)
- Ambrosia trifida (Giant ragweed)

== Animals ==
=== Amphibians ===
- Rhinella marinus (Cane toad)
- Lithobates catesbeianus (American bullfrog)

=== Birds ===
- Acridotheres tristis (common myna)
- Columba livia (rock dove)
- Corvus splendens (house crow)
- Garrulax canorus (Chinese hwamei)
- Leiothrix lutea (red-billed leiothrix)
- Pavo cristatus (Indian peafowl)
- Phasianus colchicus (common pheasant)
- Psittacula krameri (rose-ringed parakeet)
- Pycnonotus sinensis (light-vented bulbul)
- Streptopelia decaocto (Eurasian collared dove)

=== Fish ===
- Abbottina rivularis (Chinese false gudgeon)
- Acheilognathus cyanostigma (striped bitterling)
- Acheilognathus macropterus
- Acheilognathus rhombeus (kanehira)
- Acheilognathus typus (zenitanago)
- Channa argus (northern snakehead)
- Clarias batrachus (Walking catfish)
- Clarias gariepinus (African catfish)
- Ctenopharyngodon idella (grass carp)
- Cyprinus carpio (common carp)
- Gambusia affinis (Mosquitofish)
- Gambusia holbrooki (eastern mosquitofish)
- Hemibarbus maculatus (spotted steed)
- Hemiculter leucisculus (sharpbelly)
- Ictalurus punctatus (channel catfish)
- Lepomis macrochirus (bluegill)
- Mayaheros urophthalmus (Mayan cichlid)
- Micropterus dolomieu (smallmouth bass)
- Micropterus salmoides (largemouth bass)
- Monopterus albus (Asian swamp eel)
- Oncorhynchus mykiss (rainbow trout)
- Poecilia reticulata (Guppy)
- Pseudorasbora parva (stone moroko)
- Rhodeus ocellatus (rosy bitterling)
- Salmo trutta (brown trout)
- Silurus asotus (Amur catfish)
- Tridentiger brevispinis (numachichibu)
- Xiphophorus hellerii (green swordtail)

=== Mammals ===
- Bos taurus (cattle)
- Callosciurus erythraeus (Pallas's squirrel)
- Callosciurus finlaysonii (Finlayson's squirrel)
- Canis familiaris (dog)
- Capra aegagrus (feral goat)
- Equus asinus (donkey)
- Erinaceus amurensis (Amur hedgehog)
- Eutamias sibiricus (Siberian chipmunk)
- Felis catus (Feral cats)
- Urva auropunctata (small Indian mongoose)
- Macaca cyclopis (Formosan rock macaque)
- Macaca fascicularis (crab-eating macaque)
- Macaca mulatta (rhesus macaque)
- Martes melampus (Japanese marten)
- Muntiacus reevesi (Reeves's muntjac)
- Mus musculus (house mouse)
- Mustela itatsi (Japanese weasel)
- Mustela sibirica (Siberian weasel)
- Myocastor coypus (coypu)
- Neogale vison (American mink)
- Nyctereutes procyonoides (raccoon dog)
- Ondatra zibethicus (muskrat)
- Oryctolagus cuniculus (European rabbit)
- Ovis aries (sheep)
- Paguma larvata (masked palm civet)
- Procyon lotor (raccoon)
- Rattus norvegicus (Brown rat)
- Rattus rattus (black rat)
- Sus scrofa (wild boar)

=== Reptiles ===
- Anolis carolinensis (Carolina anole)
- Chelydra serpentina (common snapping turtle)
- Cuora flavomarginata (Chinese box turtle)
- Gekko hokouensis (Hokou gecko)
- Hemidactylus frenatus (common house gecko)
- Lepidodactylus lugubris (mourning gecko)
- Orthriophis taeniurus (beauty rat snake)
- Pelodiscus sinensis (Chinese softshell turtle)
- Trachemys scripta (red-eared slider)
- Protobothrops elegans (elegant pitviper)
- Protobothrops mucrosquamatus (brown spotted pit viper)

=== Insects ===
- Agriosphodrus dohrni
- Aleurodicus dispersus (spiralling whitefly)
- Anoplolepis gracilipes (yellow crazy ant)
- Aromia bungii (red-necked longhorn)
- Bemisia tabaci (silverleaf whitefly)
- Bombus terrestris (buff-tailed bumblebee)
- Cameraria ohridella (horse-chestnut leaf miner)
- Cavelerius saccharivorus (oriental chinch bug)
- Ceratitis capitata (Mediterranean fruit fly)
- Chrysomya bezziana (Old World screwworm fly)
- Cinara cupressi (cypress aphid)
- Coptotermes formosanus (Formosan subterranean termite)
- Corythucha ciliata (sycamore lace bug)
- Ctenarytaina eucalypti (blue gum psyllid)
- Cydalima perspectalis (box tree moth)
- Cylas formicarius (sweet potato weevil)
- Delta pyriforme
- Dendroctonus micans (great spruce bark beetle)
- Dendroctonus pseudotsugae (Douglas-fir beetle)
- Drosophila suzukii (spotted wing drosophila)
- Epilachna varivestis (Mexican bean beetle)
- Erionota torus (rounded palm-redeye)
- Euscepes postfasciatus (West Indian sweetpotato weevil)
- Frankliniella occidentalis (western flower thrips)
- Hylurgus ligniperda (red-haired pine bark beetle)
- Hypera postica (alfalfa weevil)
- Hyphantria cunea (fall webworm)
- Icerya purchasi (cottony cushion scale)
- Linepithema humile (Argentine ant)
- Liriomyza sativae (vegetable leaf miner)
- Lissorhoptrus oryzophilus (rice water weevil)
- Liriomyza trifolii (serpentine leafminer)
- Monomorium pharaonis (pharaoh ant)
- Nealsomyia rufella
- Opisthoplatia orientalis
- Oracella acuta (loblolly pine mealybug)
- Paraglenea fortunei
- Parasa lepida (nettle caterpillar)
- Pheidole megacephala (big-headed ant)
- Phenacoccus manihoti (cassava mealybug)
- Phenacoccus solenopsis (cotton mealybug)
- Pineus pini (pine woolly aphid)
- Platypus quercivorus (oak ambrosia beetle)
- Quadrastichus erythrinae (Erythrina gall wasp)
- Rhabdoscelus obscurus (sugarcane weevil borer)
- Rhynchophorus ferrugineus (red palm weevil)
- Solenopsis geminata (tropical fire ant)
- Solenopsis invicta (red imported fire ant)
- Thrips palmi (melon thrips)
- Trialeurodes vaporariorum (glasshouse whitefly)
- Trichomyrmex destructor (destructive trailing ant)
- Unaspis yanonensis (arrowhead snow scale)
- Vespa velutina (Asian predatory wasp)
- Wasmannia auropunctata (electric ant)
- Xyleborus volvulus

=== Molluscs ===
- Brachidontes pharaonis (variable mussel)
- Corbicula fluminea (Asian clam)
- Limnoperna fortunei (golden mussel)
- Mytilopsis sallei (black-striped mussel)
- Mytilus galloprovincialis (Mediterranean mussel)
- Perna viridis (Asian green mussel)
- Pinctada radiata (Atlantic pearl-oyster)
- Venerupis philippinarum (Manila clam)
- Xenostrobus securis (small brown mussel)

==== Gastropods ====
- Ambigolimax valentianus (threeband gardenslug)
- Cornu aspersum (garden snail)
- Crepidula fornicata (common slipper shell)
- Crepidula onyx (onyx slippersnail)
- Euglandina rosea (rosy wolfsnail)
- Lissachatina fulica (giant African snail)
- Nassarius sinarus (Nassarius snail)
- Pomacea canaliculata (Golden apple snail)
- Potamopyrgus antipodarum (New Zealand mud snail)
- Rapana venosa (veined rapa whelk)

=== Other Animals ===
- Aculops lycopersici (tomato russet mite)
- Amphibalanus amphitrite (striped barnacle)
- Amphibalanus improvisus (bay barnacle)
- Bugula neritina (brown bryozoan)
- Bursaphelenchus xylophilus (pine wood nematode)
- Chamberlinius hualinensis
- Crangonyx floridanus (Florida crangonyctid)
- Globodera rostochiensis (golden nematode)
- Hydroides elegans
- Latrodectus geometricus (brown widow)
- Latrodectus hasseltii (redback spider)
- Pacifastacus leniusculus (signal crayfish)
- Platydemus manokwari (New Guinea flatworm)
- Polyandrocarpa zorritensis
- Procambarus clarkii (red swamp crawfish)
- Pyromaia tuberculata (tuberculate pear crab)
