= List of invasive species in Japan =

Invasive species include those introduced from overseas, such as the red-eared slider, as well as plants or animals introduced outside their native range within Japan (Siberian chipmunk, etc.). This is a non-exhaustive list, largely based on data from the National Institute of Environmental Studies.

== Animal species ==
=== Mammals ===
- Bos taurus (cattle) - Problematic in Tokara Islands
- Callosciurus erythraeus (Pallas's squirrel) - Invasive in various areas in Japan.
- Callosciurus finlaysonii (Finlayson's squirrel) - Invasive in Shizuoka prefecture.
- Canis familiaris (dog)
- Capra aegagrus (feral goat)
- Erinaceus amurensis (Amur hedgehog)
- Eutamias sibiricus (Siberian chipmunk) - Native to Hokkaido, invasive in Honshu.
- Felis catus (feral cat)
- Macaca cyclopis (Formosan rock macaque)
- Macaca mulatta (rhesus macaque)
- Martes melampus (Japanese marten) Honshu native, invasive in Hokkaido and Sado Island
- Muntiacus reevesi (Reeves's muntjac)
- Mus musculus (house mouse) - Nationwide.
- Mustela itatsi (Japanese weasel) Honshu native, invasive in Hokkaido
- Mustela sibirica (Siberian weasel)
- Myocastor coypus (coypu, nutria) - Western Japan.
- Neogale vison (American mink)
- Nyctereutes procyonoides (raccoon dog)
- Ondatra zibethicus (muskrat) - Tokyo, Chiba and Saitama.
- Oryctolagus cuniculus (European rabbit)
- Paguma larvata (masked palm civet)
- Procyon lotor (raccoon)
- Rattus norvegicus (brown rat) - Invasive on outlying islands.
- Rattus rattus (black rat) - Invasive in almost all of Japan.
- Sus scrofa (wild boar) on Ototojima and Okinoerabu islands
- Urva auropunctata (small Indian mongoose) - Okinawa and Kagoshima.

=== Reptiles ===
- Anolis carolinensis (Carolina anole)
- Chelydra serpentina (common snapping turtle)
- Cuora flavomarginata (Chinese box turtle)
- Gekko hokouensis (Hokou gecko) native to outlying islands, invasive on mainland
- Hemidactylus frenatus (common house gecko)
- Lepidodactylus lugubris (mourning gecko)
- Orthriophis taeniurus (beauty rat snake)
- Pelodiscus sinensis (Chinese softshell turtle)
- Trachemys scripta elegans (red-eared slider)
- Protobothrops elegans (elegant pitviper)
- Protobothrops mucrosquamatus (brown spotted pit viper)
- Diploderma swinhonis (tree lizard)

=== Birds ===
- Columba livia (feral pigeon)
- Leiothrix lutea (red-billed leiothrix)
- Pavo cristatus (Indian peafowl)
- Phasianus colchicus (common pheasant)
- Pycnonotus sinensis (light-vented bulbul)

=== Fish ===
- Acheilognathus cyanostigma (striped bitterling)
- Acheilognathus macropterus
- Acheilognathus rhombeus (kanehira)
- Acheilognathus typus (zenitanago)
- Channa argus (northern snakehead)
- Clarias batrachus (walking catfish)
- Ctenopharyngodon idella (grass carp)
- Cyprinus carpio (common carp)
- Gambusia affinis (mosquitofish)
- Gambusia holbrooki (eastern mosquitofish)
- Ictalurus punctatus (channel catfish)
- Lepomis macrochirus (bluegill)
- Micropterus dolomieu (smallmouth bass)
- Micropterus salmoides (largemouth bass)
- Monopterus albus (Asian swamp eel)
- Oncorhynchus mykiss (rainbow trout)
- Rhodeus ocellatus (rosy bitterling)
- Salmo trutta (brown trout)
- Silurus asotus (Amur catfish)
- Tridentiger brevispinis (numachichibu)

=== Invertebrates ===
- Aculops lycopersici (tomato russet mite)
- Agriosphodrus dohrni
- Ambigolimax valentianus (threeband gardenslug)
- Amphibalanus amphitrite (striped barnacle)
- Amphibalanus improvisus (bay barnacle)
- Anoplolepis gracilipes (yellow crazy ant)
- Aromia bungii (red-necked longhorn)
- Bemisia tabaci (silverleaf whitefly)
- Blattella germanica (German cockroach)
- Bombus terrestris (buff-tailed bumblebee)
- Bugula neritina (brown bryozoan)
- Bursaphelenchus xylophilus (pine wood nematode)
- Cavelerius saccharivorus (oriental chinch bug)
- Chamberlinius hualinensis
- Coptotermes formosanus (Formosan subterranean termite)
- Corbicula fluminea (Asian clam)
- Corythucha ciliata (sycamore lace bug)
- Crangonyx floridanus (Florida crangonyctid)
- Crepidula fornicata (common slipper shell)
- Crepidula onyx (onyx slippersnail)
- Cylas formicarius (sweet potato weevil)
- Delta pyriforme
- Drosophila suzukii (spotted wing drosophila)
- Dryocosmus kuriphilus (chestnut gall wasp)
- Epilachna varivestis (Mexican bean beetle)
- Euglandina rosea (rosy wolfsnail)
- Euscepes postfasciatus (West Indian sweetpotato weevil)
- Frankliniella occidentalis (western flower thrips)
- Globodera rostochiensis (golden nematode)
- Hydroides elegans
- Hylurgus ligniperda (red-haired pine bark beetle)
- Hypera postica (alfalfa weevil)
- Hyphantria cunea (fall webworm)
- Icerya purchasi (cottony cushion scale)
- Latrodectus geometricus (brown widow)
- Latrodectus hasseltii (redback spider)
- Limnoperna fortunei (golden mussel)
- Linepithema humile (Argentine ant)
- Liriomyza sativae (vegetable leaf miner)
- Liriomyza trifolii (serpentine leafminer)
- Lissachatina fulica (giant African snail)
- Lissorhoptrus oryzophilus (rice water weevil)
- Monomorium pharaonis (pharaoh ant)
- Mytilus galloprovincialis (Mediterranean mussel)
- Nassarius sinarus (Nassarius snail)
- Nealsomyia rufella
- Opisthoplatia orientalis
- Pacifastacus leniusculus (signal crayfish)
- Paraglenea fortunei
- Parasa lepida (nettle caterpillar)
- Perna viridis (Asian green mussel)
- Pheidole megacephala (big-headed ant)
- Platydemus manokwari (New Guinea flatworm)
- Polyandrocarpa zorritensis
- Pomacea canaliculata (apple snail)
- Potamopyrgus antipodarum (New Zealand mud snail)
- Procambarus clarkii (red swamp crawfish)
- Pyromaia tuberculata (tuberculate pear crab)
- Quadrastichus erythrinae (Erythrina gall wasp)
- Rhabdoscelus obscurus (sugarcane weevil borer)
- Rhynchophorus ferrugineus (red palm weevil)
- Solenopsis geminata (fire ant)
- Thrips palmi (melon thrips)
- Trialeurodes vaporariorum (glasshouse whitefly)
- Unaspis yanonensis (arrowhead snow scale)
- Vespa velutina (Asian predatory wasp)
- Xyleborus volvulus
- Xenostrobus securis (small brown mussel)

== Plant species ==
- Desmodium paniculatum
