= Heian Shrine =

Shinto shrine in Sakyō-ku, Kyoto, Japan

Heian-jingu Shrine
- 平安神宮 (Heian Jingu)
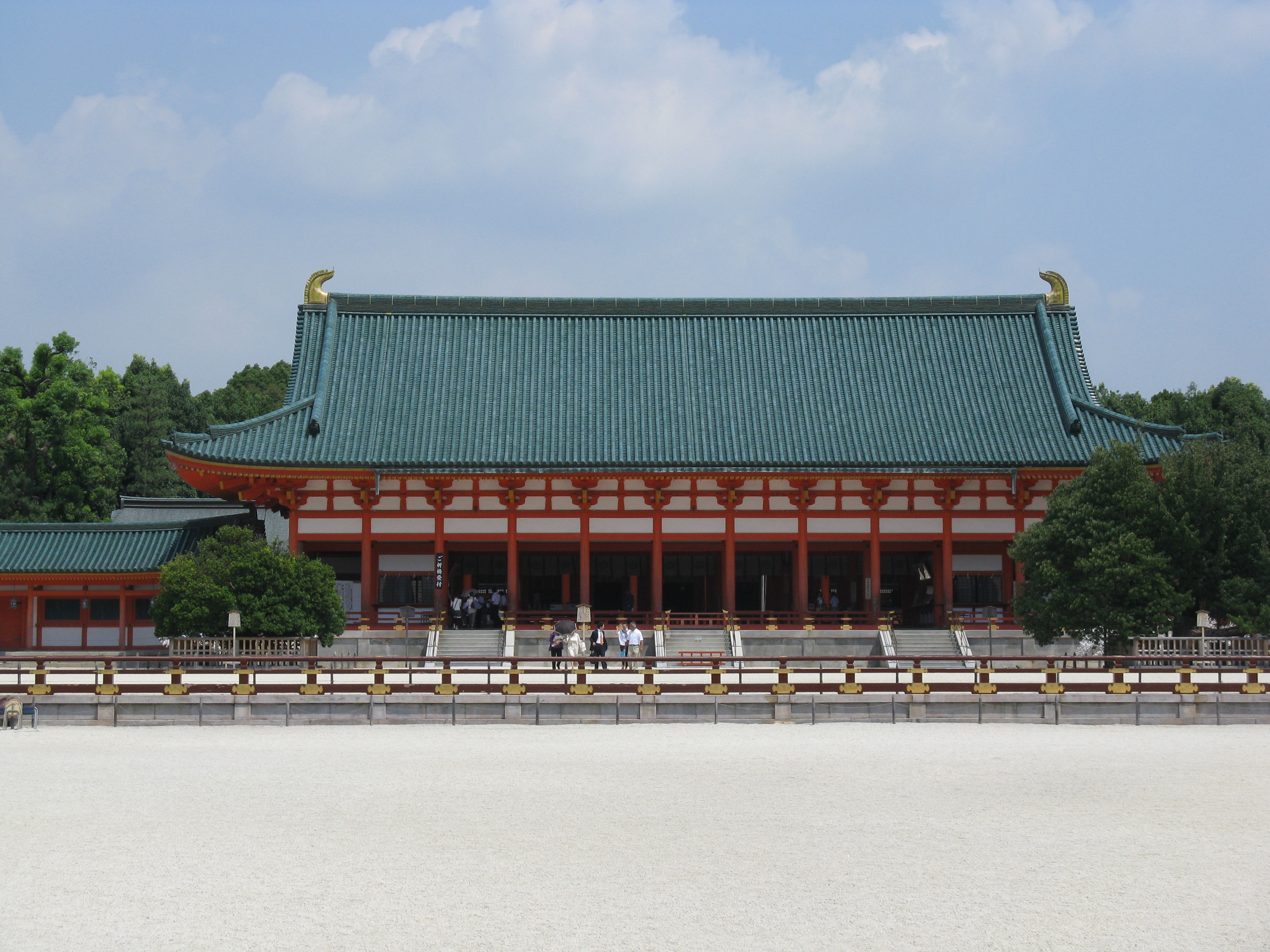
- Main Hall (Daigokuden)

- Location within Japan

Religion
- Affiliation: Shinto
- Deity: Emperor Kanmu; Emperor Kōmei
- Festival: Reitaisai (April 15th)
- Type: Kanpeitaisha; Chokusaisha; Beppyo jinja

Location
- Location: 97, Okazaki-Nishi-tenno-cho, Sakyō-ku, Kyoto-shi, Kyoto Prefecture, JAPAN, 606-8341
- Interactive map of Heian-jingu Shrine
- Coordinates: 35°01′00″N 135°46′56″E

Architecture
- Style: Shichigensya-Nagare-zukuri (七間社流造)
- Established: March 15th, 1895

Website
- www.heianjingu.or.jp

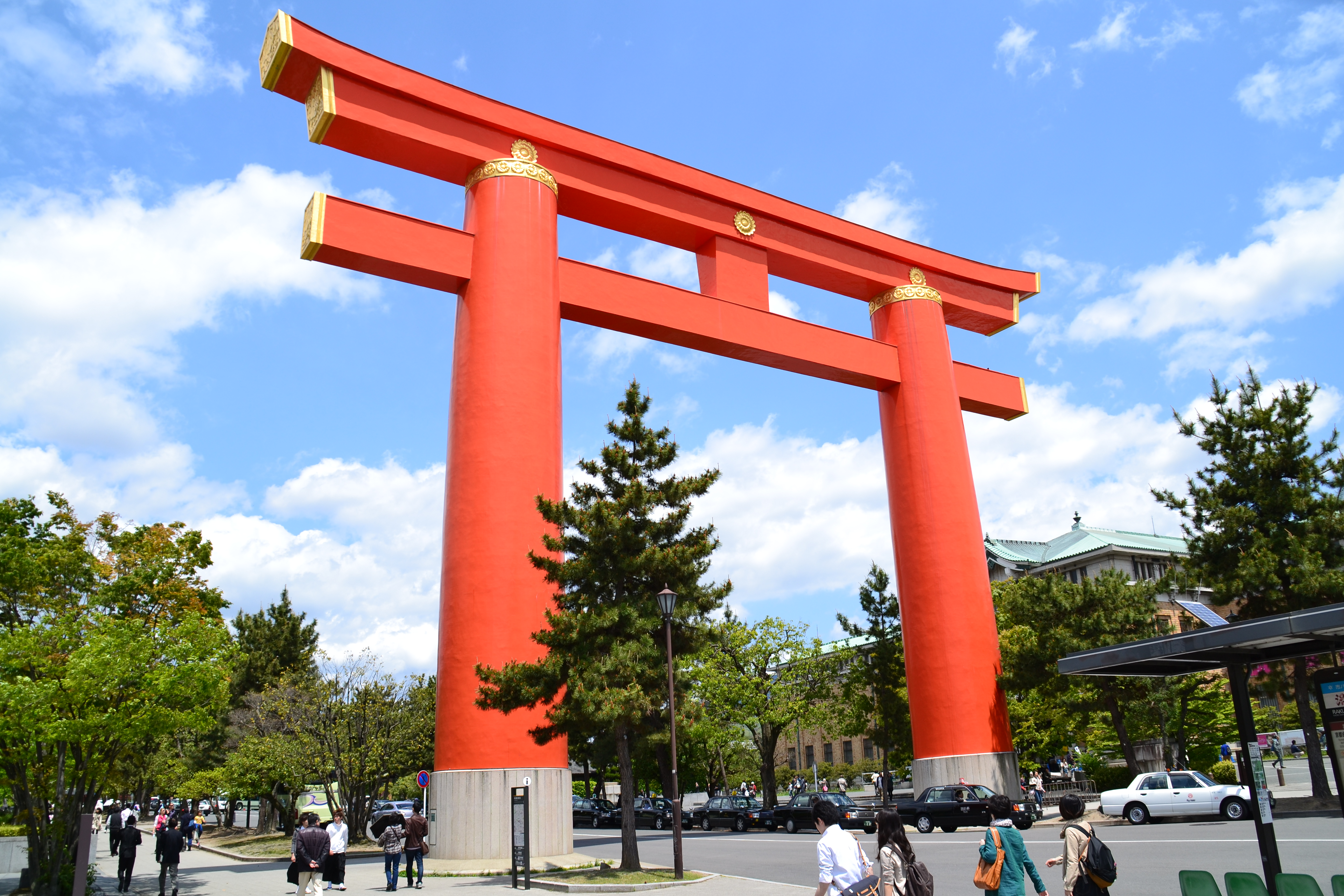
Heian Shrine Torii Gate, Kyoto, Japan

The Heian Shrine (平安神宮, Heian-jingū) is a Shinto shrine located in Sakyō-ku, Kyoto, Japan. The Shrine is ranked as a Beppyō Jinja (別表神社) (the top rank for shrines) by the Association of Shinto Shrines. It is listed as an important cultural property of Japan.

== History ==
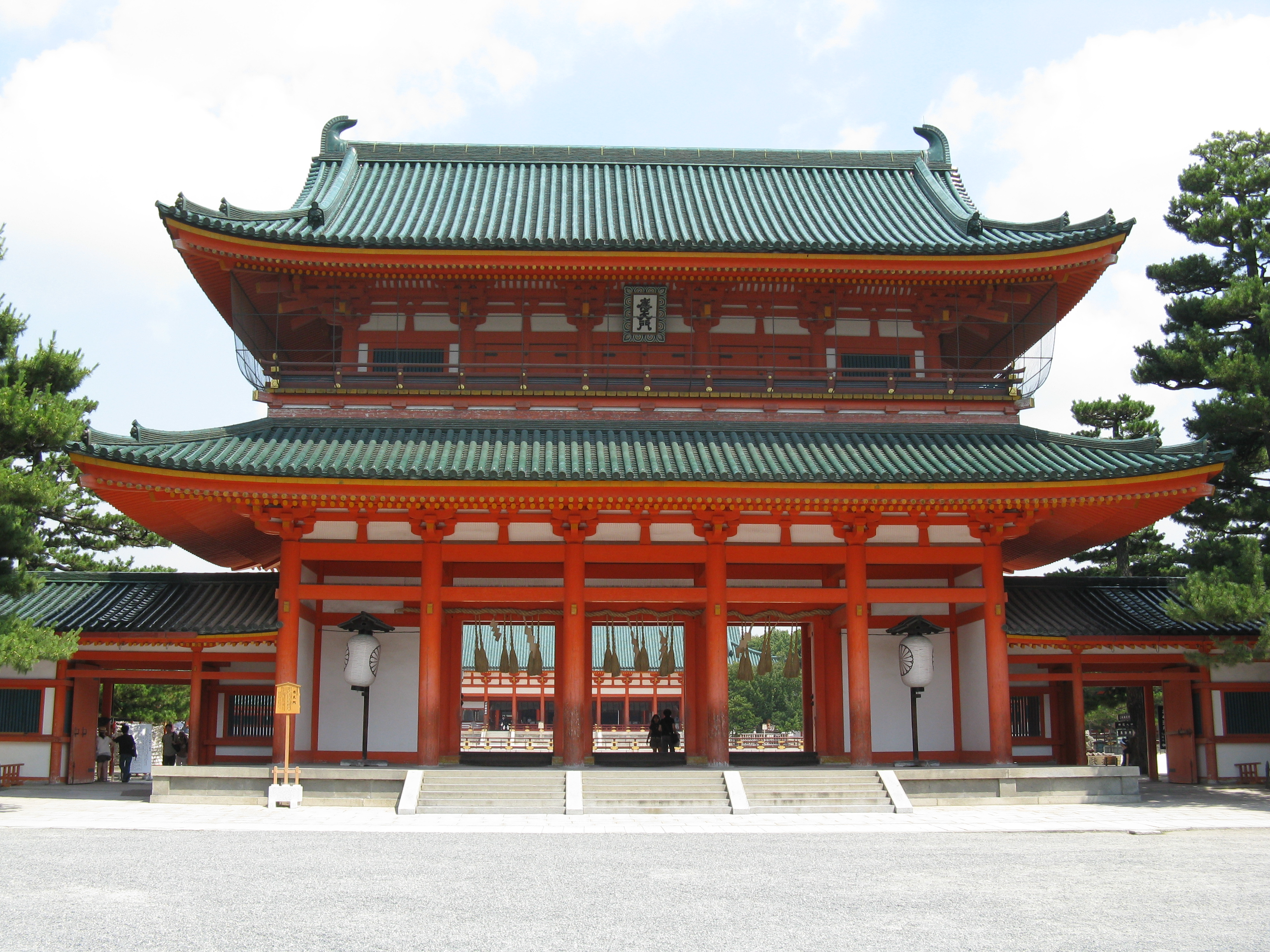
Main gate (Ōtenmon)

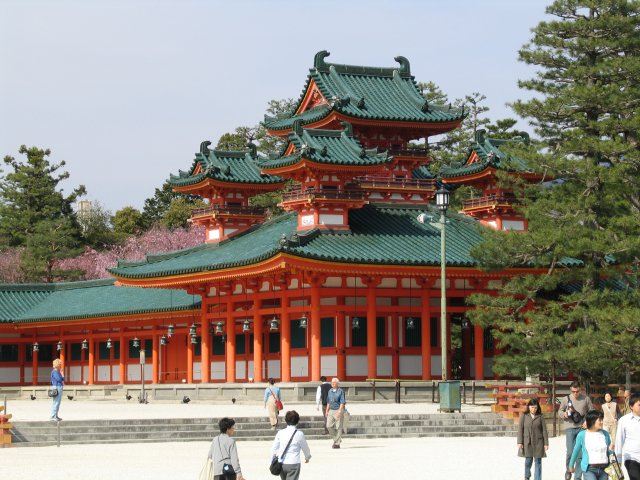
Castle in the corner (Sōryūrō)

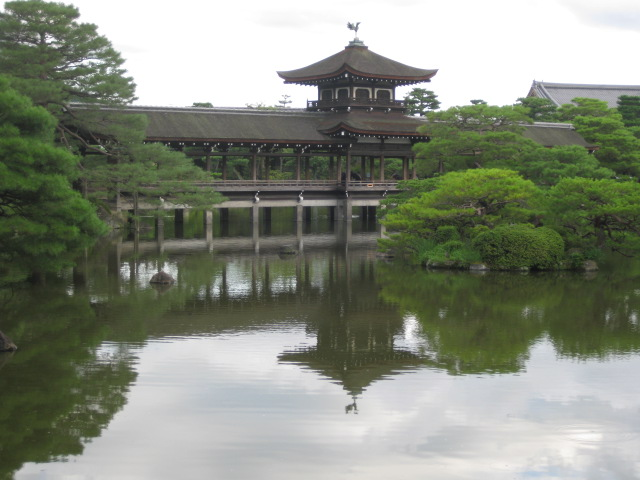
Lake at Heian Shrine

In 1895, a partial reproduction of the Heian Palace from Heian-kyō (the former name of Kyoto) was planned for construction for the 1100th anniversary of the establishment of Heian-kyō. The Industrial exposition fair (an exhibition of development of Japanese and foreign cultures) was held in Kyoto that year, where the replica was to be the main monument. However, failure to buy enough land where the Heian Palace used to stand, the building was built in Okazaki at 5/8 scale of the original. The Heian-jingū was built according to designs by Itō Chūta.

After the Exhibition ended, the building was kept as a shrine in memory of the 50th Emperor, Emperor Kanmu, who was the Emperor when Heian-kyō became the capital. In 1940, Emperor Kōmei was added to the list of dedication.

In 1976, part of the Shrine caught on fire, and nine of the buildings, including the honden, or main sanctuary, burned down. Three years later, the burned buildings were reconstructed with money collected from donations.

== Architecture ==
The architecture design was a reproduction of the Chōdōin (Emperor's palace in the former eras) in 5/8th scale (in length). The large red entrance gate is a reproduction of the Outenmon of the Chōdōin. The architecture of the main palace mirrors the style and features of the Kyoto Imperial Palace, the style from the 11th–12th century (late Heian Period). The Shrine's torii is one of the largest in Japan.

== Garden ==
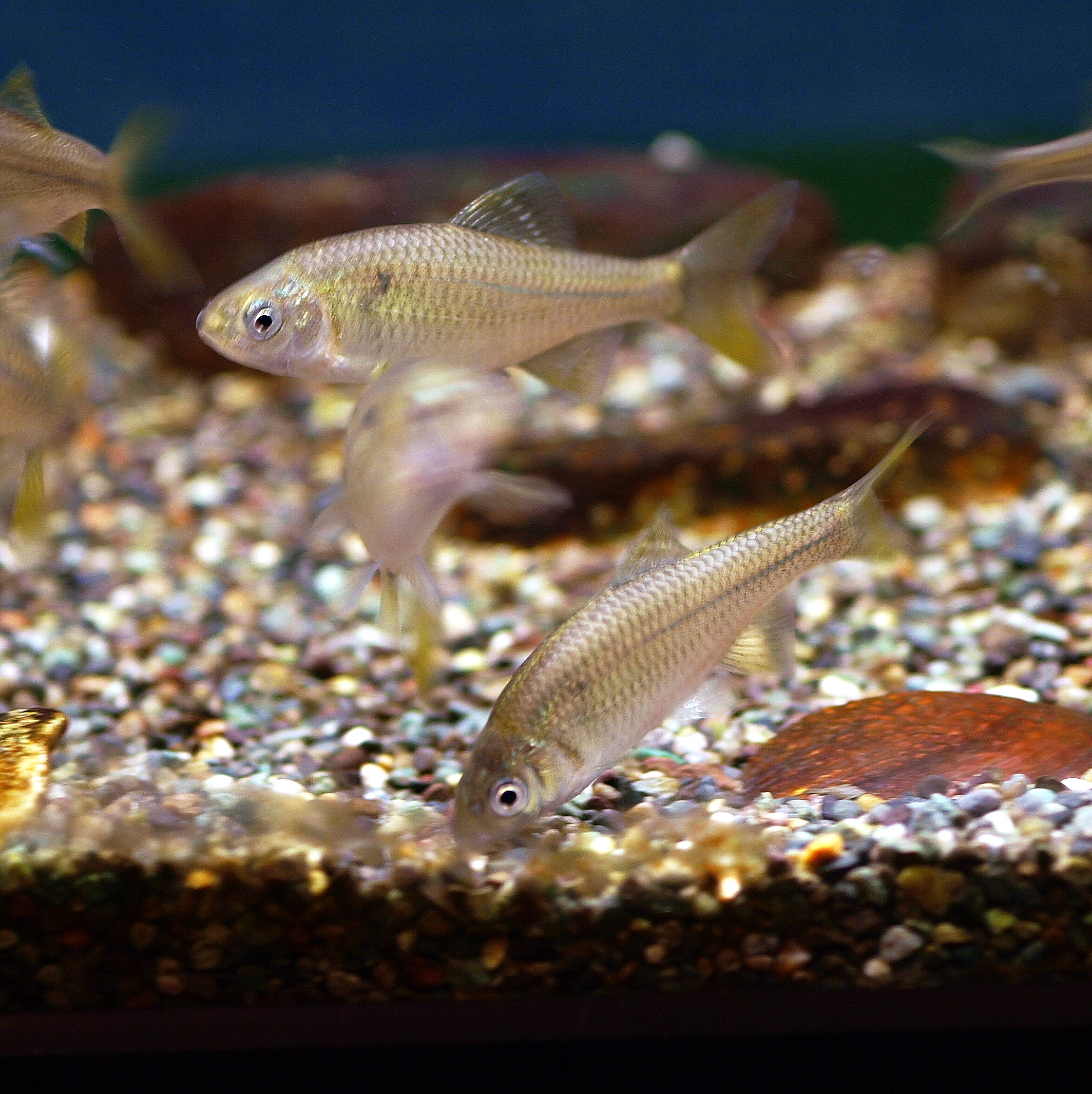
The striped bitterling

The Japanese-style garden takes up about half the land area (approximately 33,060 m^{2} or 355,900 sq ft). Renowned gardener Ogawa Jihei VII, known as Ueji, created the garden over more than twenty years. The water used in the ponds comes from the Lake Biwa Canal. Species otherwise rare in Japan, such as the striped bitterling, the yellow pond turtle, and the Japanese pond turtle live in and around the ponds. Visitors may feed the fish and turtles with food sold around the ponds.

== Festivals ==
Annual festivals celebrate the memory of Emperor Kōmei (late January) and Emperor Kanmu (early April).

On October 22, Heian-jingū hosts the Jidai Matsuri, which is one of the most important festivals of Kyoto. The procession of this festival begins at the old Imperial palace, and includes carrying the mikoshi (portable shrines) of Emperors Kanmu and Kōmei to the Heian-jingū.

The Shrine is also used for traditional Japanese weddings as well as concerts. It is rare for a modern concert to be held at a historic site like the shrine, but merging modern and old culture in Kyoto has become a trend.

== Around the Shrine ==
Adjacent to the Shrine is Okazaki Park, where visitors can learn about culture. The Shrine is surrounded by the Kyoto Prefectural Library, Kyoto Municipal Museum of Art, the National Museum of Modern Art, Kyoto, Rohm Theatre Kyoto, and the Kyoto City Zoo.

== In media ==
Parts of the 2003 film Lost in Translation were filmed there.

== See also ==
- Heian period
- List of Jingū

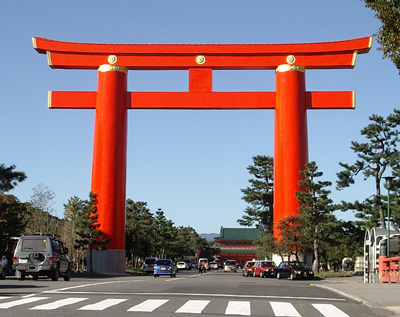
Heian-jingū's torii
