= Russian bitterling =

Conservation status
- Least Concern (IUCN 3.1)

Scientific classification
- Kingdom: Animalia
- Phylum: Chordata
- Class: Actinopterygii
- Division: Teleostei
- Order: Cypriniformes
- Suborder: Cyprinoidei
- Family: Acheilognathidae
- Genus: Acheilognathus
- Species: A. asmussii

Binomial name
- Acheilognathus asmussii (Dybowski, 1872)

Synonyms
- Devario asmussii Dybowski, 1872; Acanthorhodeus asmussii (Dybowski, 1872)

Species of fish

The Russian bitterling (Acheilognathus asmussii), or spiny bitterling, is a species temperate freshwater ray-finned fish belonging to the family Acheilognathidae, the bitterlings. This bitterling is found in the Amur River basin in Asia.

== Taxonomy ==
The Russian bitterling was first formally described as Devario asmussii in 1872 by the Polish naturalist and physician Benedykt Dybowski with its type locality given as Lake Khanka in southeastern Russia. The species was later placed in the genus Acanthorhodeus Bleeker, 1871, mainly in Russian literature, but this name is regarded as a synonym of Acheilognathus Bleeker, 1859. This species is classified in the family Acheilognathidae, the bitterlings in the suborder Cyprinoidei of the order Cypriniformes, the carp-like fishes.

== Etymology ==
The Russian bitterling is classified in the genus Acheilognathus, a name which combines a, indicating an absence, cheilos, ,meaning "lip", and gnathos, which means "jaw". This refers to the absence of a labial fold in the type species A. melanogaster, giving the impression that the lip and jaw are merged. The identity of the person homoured in the specific name was not specified by Dybowski but it is likely to be the German entomologist Eduard Assmuss, although, if it is him, then Dybowski misspelt his surname.

== Description ==
The Russian bitterling reaches a total length of 16 cm (6.3 in), althoigh 5 cm (2.0 in) is more typical.

== Distribution and habitat ==
The Russian bitterling is endemicto the Amur basin in Russia and China between Olgin and Mago in all of the southern tributaries and some of the northern tributaries. It appears to have been introduced to some parts of the Upper Amur. In Mongolia it has been recorded from the Kherlen, Onon and Khalkh systems, and Lake Buir. This fish is found in mainstream rivers and lakes, as well as tributaries and smaller streams so long as there is a sufficient population of bivalve molluscs to support its breeding.

== Biology ==
The Russian bitterling is sedentary and does not migrate. Eggs are laid in the shells of mussels of the genus Cristaria.
