= A. melanogaster =

A. melanogaster may refer to:

- Acheilognathus melanogaster, a ray-finned fish species
- Anhinga melanogaster, the Oriental darter, Indian darter or snakebird, a water bird species of tropical South Asia and Southeast Asia

== See also ==
- Melanogaster (disambiguation)
