= Elongate bitterling =

Conservation status
- Critically Endangered (IUCN 3.1)

Scientific classification
- Kingdom: Animalia
- Phylum: Chordata
- Class: Actinopterygii
- Order: Cypriniformes
- Suborder: Cyprinoidei
- Family: Acheilognathidae
- Genus: Acheilognathus
- Species: A. elongatus

Binomial name
- Acheilognathus elongatus (Regan, 1908)

Synonyms
- Acanthorhodeus elongatus Regan, 1908; Acanthorhodeus grahami Nichols, 1918

Species of fish

The elongate bitterling (Acheilognathus elongatus) is a species of freshwater ray-finned fish in the family Acheilognathidae, the bitterlings. It is found only in shallow water areas along the shores of Lake Dianchi in China.

It has a silvery-white body with an olive dorsal surface and a black stripe along the side. It grows to a maximum length of 7.0 centimetres (2.8 in).

The fish is currently listed as critically endangered because its tiny range of 58 km^{2} (22 sq mi) within Lake Dianchi is threatened due to water pollution, which causes the destruction of its bivalves, which are essential for hatching its eggs. Likewise, artificial dykes and the enclosing of lakes for farmland is causing degradation of its habitat. It had likely disappeared by the 1980s, but further surveys are necessary to confirm its possible extinction.
