= Acheilognathus brevicaudatus =

Conservation status
- Critically Endangered (IUCN 3.1)

Scientific classification
- Kingdom: Animalia
- Phylum: Chordata
- Class: Actinopterygii
- Order: Cypriniformes
- Suborder: Cyprinoidei
- Family: Acheilognathidae
- Genus: Acheilognathus
- Species: A. brevicaudatus

Binomial name
- Acheilognathus brevicaudatus Y. R. Chen & Z. Y. Li, 1987

Species of fish

Acheilognathus brevicaudatus is a species of freshwater ray-finned fish in the genus Acheilognathus, a bitterling. It is endemic to China.
