= Paratanakia chii =

Scientific classification
- Kingdom: Animalia
- Phylum: Chordata
- Class: Actinopterygii
- Order: Cypriniformes
- Family: Acheilognathidae
- Genus: Paratanakia
- Species: P. chii

Binomial name
- Paratanakia chii (C. P. Miao, 1934)

Synonyms
- Acheilognathus chii C. P. Miao, 1934; Tanakia himantegus chii (C. P. Miao, 1934)

Subspecies of fish

Paratanakia chii is a species of freshwater ray-finned fish belonging to the family Acheilognathidae, the bitterlings. This fish is found in China and Taiwan.

== Etymology ==
Named in honor of Chen-Ju Ch'i, Director of Bureau of Education of Honan [now Henan] Province, China, for his "kind support" of the author's study of Kiangsu fishes.
