= Acheilognathus coreanus =

Conservation status
- Data Deficient (IUCN 3.1)

Scientific classification
- Kingdom: Animalia
- Phylum: Chordata
- Class: Actinopterygii
- Order: Cypriniformes
- Suborder: Cyprinoidei
- Family: Acheilognathidae
- Genus: Acheilognathus
- Species: A. coreanus

Binomial name
- Acheilognathus coreanus Steindachner, 1892

Species of fish

Acheilognathus coreanus is a species of freshwater ray-finned fish in the genus Acheilognathus, a bitterling. It is found in Korea.
