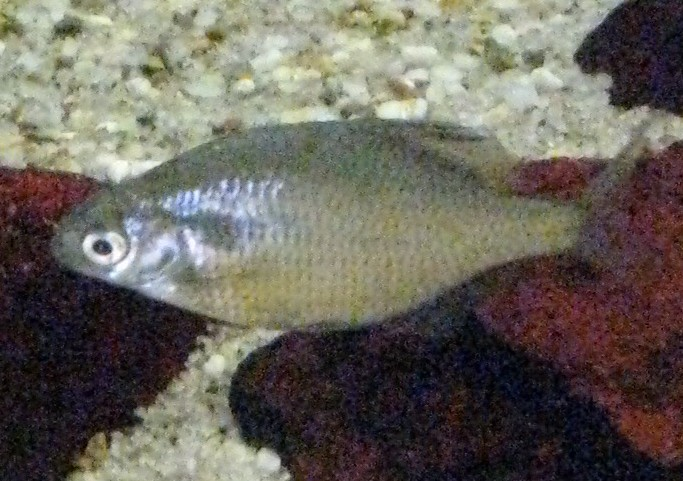

Conservation status
- Endangered (IUCN 3.1)

Scientific classification
- Kingdom: Animalia
- Phylum: Chordata
- Class: Actinopterygii
- Order: Cypriniformes
- Suborder: Cyprinoidei
- Family: Acheilognathidae
- Genus: Acheilognathus
- Species: A. longipinnis

Binomial name
- Acheilognathus longipinnis (Regan, 1905)

= Deepbody bitterling =

Species of fish

The Deepbody bitterling or Itasenpara bitterling (Acheilognathus longipinnis) is a species of freshwater ray-finned fish belonging the family of Acheilognathidae. It is endemic to central and southern Japan. It grows to a maximum length of 8.0 cm.
