= Acheilognathus majusculus =

Scientific classification
- Domain: Eukaryota
- Kingdom: Animalia
- Phylum: Chordata
- Class: Actinopterygii
- Order: Cypriniformes
- Suborder: Cyprinoidei
- Family: Acheilognathidae
- Genus: Acheilognathus
- Species: A. majusculus

Binomial name
- Acheilognathus majusculus I. S. Kim & H. Yang, 1998

Species of fish

Acheilognathus majusculus is a species of freshwater ray-finned fish in the genus Acheilognathus, a bitterling. It is endemic to the Seomjin and Nakdong rivers in South Korea. It grows to a maximum length of 10.0 cm.
