= Acheilognathus macromandibularis =

Scientific classification
- Kingdom: Animalia
- Phylum: Chordata
- Class: Actinopterygii
- Order: Cypriniformes
- Suborder: Cyprinoidei
- Family: Acheilognathidae
- Genus: Acheilognathus
- Species: A. macromandibularis

Binomial name
- Acheilognathus macromandibularis A. Doi, R. Arai & H. Z. Liu, 1999

Synonyms
- Acanthorhodeus macropterus Bleeker, 1871; Acanthorhodeus guichenoti Bleeker, 1871; Acanthorhodeus dicaeus Rutter, 1897; Acheilognathus dicaeus (Rutter, 1897); Acanthorhodeus longispinnis Oshima, 1926; Acanthorhodeus bergi Mori, 1928; Acanthorhodeus ngowyangi Tchang, 1930; Acanthorhodeus jeholicus Mori, 1934; Paracheilognathus jeholicus (Mori, 1934)

Species of fish

Acheilognathus macromandibularis is a species of freshwater ray-finned fish in the genus Acheilognathus, a bitterling. It is endemic to China. It grows to a maximum length of 5.2 cm (2.0 in).
