= Acheilognathus polylepis =

Conservation status
- Least Concern (IUCN 3.1)

Scientific classification
- Kingdom: Animalia
- Phylum: Chordata
- Class: Actinopterygii
- Order: Cypriniformes
- Family: Acheilognathidae
- Genus: Acheilognathus
- Species: A. polylepis

Binomial name
- Acheilognathus polylepis (H. W. Wu, 1964)

Synonyms
- Acanthorhodeus polylepis Wu, 1964

Species of fish

Acheilognathus polylepis is a species of ray-finned fish in the genus Acheilognathus, bitterling. It is endemic to China.
