= Acheilognathus polyspinus =

Conservation status
- Data Deficient (IUCN 3.1)

Scientific classification
- Kingdom: Animalia
- Phylum: Chordata
- Class: Actinopterygii
- Order: Cypriniformes
- Suborder: Cyprinoidei
- Family: Acheilognathidae
- Genus: Acheilognathus
- Species: A. polyspinus

Binomial name
- Acheilognathus polyspinus (Holčík, 1972)

Synonyms
- Acanthorhodeus polyspinus Holcík, 1972; Acanthorhodeus dayeus Mai, 1978

Species of fish

Acheilognathus polyspinus is a species of ray-finned fish in the genus Acheilognathus. a bitterling. It is endemic to Vietnam.
