= Acheilognathus longibarbatus =

Scientific classification
- Kingdom: Animalia
- Phylum: Chordata
- Class: Actinopterygii
- Order: Cypriniformes
- Suborder: Cyprinoidei
- Family: Acheilognathidae
- Genus: Acheilognathus
- Species: A. longibarbatus

Binomial name
- Acheilognathus longibarbatus (Đ. Y. Mai, 1978)

Synonyms
- Acanthorhodeus longibarbatus Mai, 1978

Species of fish

Acheilognathus longibarbatus is a species of fresh water ray-finned fish in the genus Acheilognathus, a bitterling. It is endemic to Laos and northern Vietnam. It grows to a maximum length of 9.2 cm.
