= Acheilognathus barbatus =

Conservation status
- Vulnerable (IUCN 3.1)

Scientific classification
- Kingdom: Animalia
- Phylum: Chordata
- Class: Actinopterygii
- Order: Cypriniformes
- Suborder: Cyprinoidei
- Family: Acheilognathidae
- Genus: Acheilognathus
- Species: A. barbatus

Binomial name
- Acheilognathus barbatus Nichols, 1926

Species of fish

Acheilognathus barbatus is a species of freshwater ray-finned fish in the genus Acheilognathus. It is endemic to the Mingjiang and Yangtze rivers in China. Its common length is 4.0 cm.
