= Acheilognathus barbatulus =

Conservation status
- Least Concern (IUCN 3.1)

Scientific classification
- Kingdom: Animalia
- Phylum: Chordata
- Class: Actinopterygii
- Order: Cypriniformes
- Suborder: Cyprinoidei
- Family: Acheilognathidae
- Genus: Acheilognathus
- Species: A. barbatulus

Binomial name
- Acheilognathus barbatulus Günther, 1873

Synonyms
- Acanthorhodeus barbatulus (Günther, 1873); Paracheilognathus peihoensis Fowler, 1910; Acheilognathus peihoensis Fowler, 1910; Acheilognathus shibatae Mori, 1928; Acheilognathus argenteus Wu, 1939

Species of fish

Acheilognathus barbatulus, the Kinesisk bitterling, is a species of freshwater ray-finned fish in the genus Acheilognathus. It is endemic to the Mekong river in Laos, northern Vietnam and southern China in waters between 8-20 °C and its maximum length is 8.4 cm.
