= Acheilognathus microphysa =

Conservation status
- Endangered (IUCN 3.1)

Scientific classification
- Kingdom: Animalia
- Phylum: Chordata
- Class: Actinopterygii
- Order: Cypriniformes
- Suborder: Cyprinoidei
- Family: Acheilognathidae
- Genus: Acheilognathus
- Species: A. microphysa

Binomial name
- Acheilognathus microphysa J. X. Yang, X. L. Chu & Y. R. Chen, 1990

Species of fish

Acheilognathus microphysa is a species of ray-finned fish in the genus Acheilognathus, a bitterling. It is endemic to China.
