= Acheilognathus tonkinensis =

Conservation status
- Data Deficient (IUCN 3.1)

Scientific classification
- Kingdom: Animalia
- Phylum: Chordata
- Class: Actinopterygii
- Order: Cypriniformes
- Suborder: Cyprinoidei
- Family: Acheilognathidae
- Genus: Acheilognathus
- Species: A. tonkinensis

Binomial name
- Acheilognathus tonkinensis (Vaillant, 1892)

Synonyms
- Acanthorhodeus tonkinensis Vaillant, 1892; Acanthorhodeus robustus Holcík, 1972

Species of fish

Acheilognathus tonkinensis is a species of freshwater ray-finned fish in the family Acheilognathidae, the bitterlings. It is found in northern Vietnam, Laos, and southern China. It occurs in rivers and deposits its eggs inside freshwater mussels.
