= Acheilognathus hypselonotus =

Conservation status
- Critically Endangered (IUCN 3.1)

Scientific classification
- Kingdom: Animalia
- Phylum: Chordata
- Class: Actinopterygii
- Order: Cypriniformes
- Family: Acheilognathidae
- Genus: Acheilognathus
- Species: A. hypselonotus

Binomial name
- Acheilognathus hypselonotus (Bleeker, 1871)

Species of fish

Acheilognathus hypselonotus is a species of freshwater ray-finned fish in the genus Acheilognathus, a bitterling. It is found in the lower regions of the Yangtze River in China. Its maximum length is 16.5 cm. This species is once thought to be extinct, but was rediscovered in Dongting Lake in 2018.

== Distribution ==
Acheilognathus hypselonotus is endemic to China, only known from Dongting Lake near Yueyang City. It's estimated Extent of occurrence is 12 km^{2}
