= Acheilognathus gracilis =

Conservation status
- Least Concern (IUCN 3.1)

Scientific classification
- Kingdom: Animalia
- Phylum: Chordata
- Class: Actinopterygii
- Order: Cypriniformes
- Family: Acheilognathidae
- Genus: Acheilognathus
- Species: A. gracilis

Binomial name
- Acheilognathus gracilis Nichols, 1926

Synonyms
- Acheilognathus luchowensis Wu, 1931; Acanthorhodeus fowleri Holcík & Nalbant, 1964

Species of fish

Acheilognathus gracilis is a species of ray-finned fish in the genus Acheilognathus, a bitterling. It is endemic to China.
