= Acheilognathus changtingensis =

Conservation status
- Near Threatened (IUCN 3.1)

Scientific classification
- Kingdom: Animalia
- Phylum: Chordata
- Class: Actinopterygii
- Order: Cypriniformes
- Family: Acheilognathidae
- Genus: Acheilognathus
- Species: A. changtingensis

Binomial name
- Acheilognathus changtingensis Qing Yang, Y. R. Zhu, B. X. Xiong & H. Z. Liu, 2011

Species of fish

Acheilognathus changtingensis is a species of freshwater ray-finned fish in the genus Acheilognathus, a bitterling. It is endemic to China where it is found in the Hanjiang River in Fujian Province.
