= Acheilognathus imberbis =

Conservation status
- Least Concern (IUCN 3.1)

Scientific classification
- Kingdom: Animalia
- Phylum: Chordata
- Class: Actinopterygii
- Order: Cypriniformes
- Family: Acheilognathidae
- Genus: Acheilognathus
- Species: A. imberbis

Binomial name
- Acheilognathus imberbis Günther, 1868

Synonyms
- Paracheilognathus imberbis (Günther, 1868)

Species of fish

Acheilognathus imberbis is a species of ray-finned fish in the genus Acheilognathus, a bitterling. It is endemic to the Zhejiang, Shandong, Hubei, Hunan, Sichuan and Jiangsu provinces of China. Its common length is 6.7 cm.
