= Acheilognathus nguyenvanhaoi =

Scientific classification
- Domain: Eukaryota
- Kingdom: Animalia
- Phylum: Chordata
- Class: Actinopterygii
- Order: Cypriniformes
- Suborder: Cyprinoidei
- Family: Acheilognathidae
- Genus: Acheilognathus
- Species: A. nguyenvanhaoi

Binomial name
- Acheilognathus nguyenvanhaoi Nguyễn Hữu Dực, Trần Đức Hậu, Tạ Thị Thủy, 2013

Species of fish

Acheilognathus nguyenvanhaoi (Vietnamese: Cá Thè be sọc lớn) is a species of freshwater ray-finned fish in the genus Acheilognathus, a bitterling. It is endemic to Vietnam.

Named in honor of Vietnamese ichthyologist Nguyen Van Hao.
