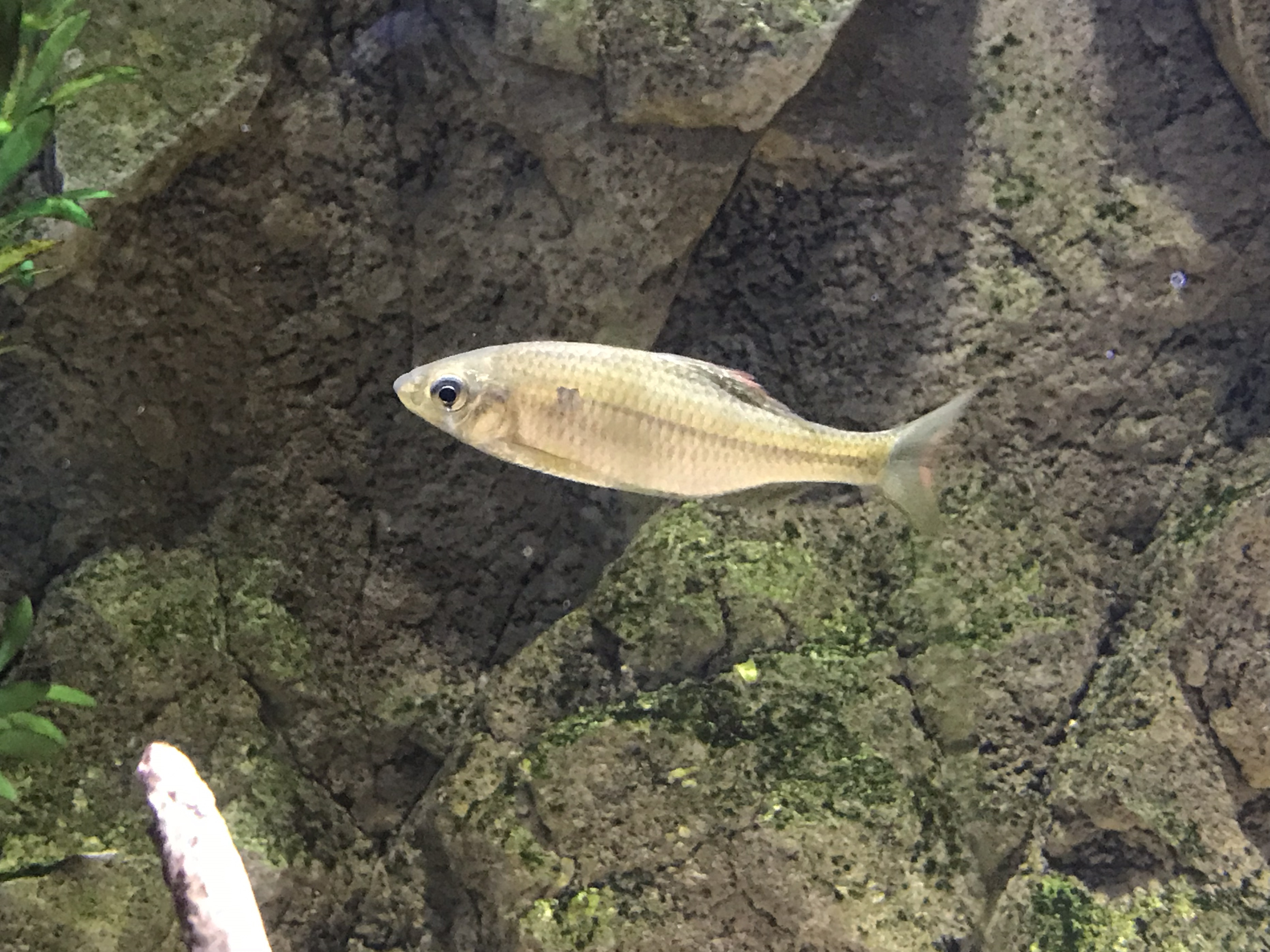

Scientific classification
- Domain: Eukaryota
- Kingdom: Animalia
- Phylum: Chordata
- Class: Actinopterygii
- Order: Cypriniformes
- Suborder: Cyprinoidei
- Family: Acheilognathidae
- Genus: Acheilognathus
- Species: A. yamatsutae

Binomial name
- Acheilognathus yamatsutae T. Mori, 1928

= Acheilognathus yamatsutae =

Species of fish

Acheilognathus yamatsutae is a species of freshwater ray-finned fish in the genus Acheilognathus, a bitterling. It is endemic to Korea and China.

Named in honor of Mr. K. Yamatsuta, a teacher at the Mukden Higher Girls School, who "obtained … a fine type specimen".
