= Acheilognathus meridianus =

Conservation status
- Data Deficient (IUCN 3.1)

Scientific classification
- Kingdom: Animalia
- Phylum: Chordata
- Class: Actinopterygii
- Order: Cypriniformes
- Suborder: Cyprinoidei
- Family: Acheilognathidae
- Genus: Acheilognathus
- Species: A. meridianus

Binomial name
- Acheilognathus meridianus (H. W. Wu, 1939)

Species of fish

Acheilognathus meridianus is a species of freshwater ray-finned fish in the genus Acheilognathus, a bitterling. It is endemic to China and northern Vietnam. It grows to a maximum length of 10.0 cm.
