= Acheilognathus omeiensis =

Conservation status
- Near Threatened (IUCN 3.1)

Scientific classification
- Kingdom: Animalia
- Phylum: Chordata
- Class: Actinopterygii
- Order: Cypriniformes
- Family: Acheilognathidae
- Genus: Acheilognathus
- Species: A. omeiensis

Binomial name
- Acheilognathus omeiensis (H. J. Shih & T. L. Tchang, 1934)

Synonyms
- Acanthorhodeus omeiensis Shih & Tchang, 1934

Species of fish

Acheilognathus omeiensis is a species of ray-finned fish in the genus Acheilognathus, bitterling. It is endemic to China.
