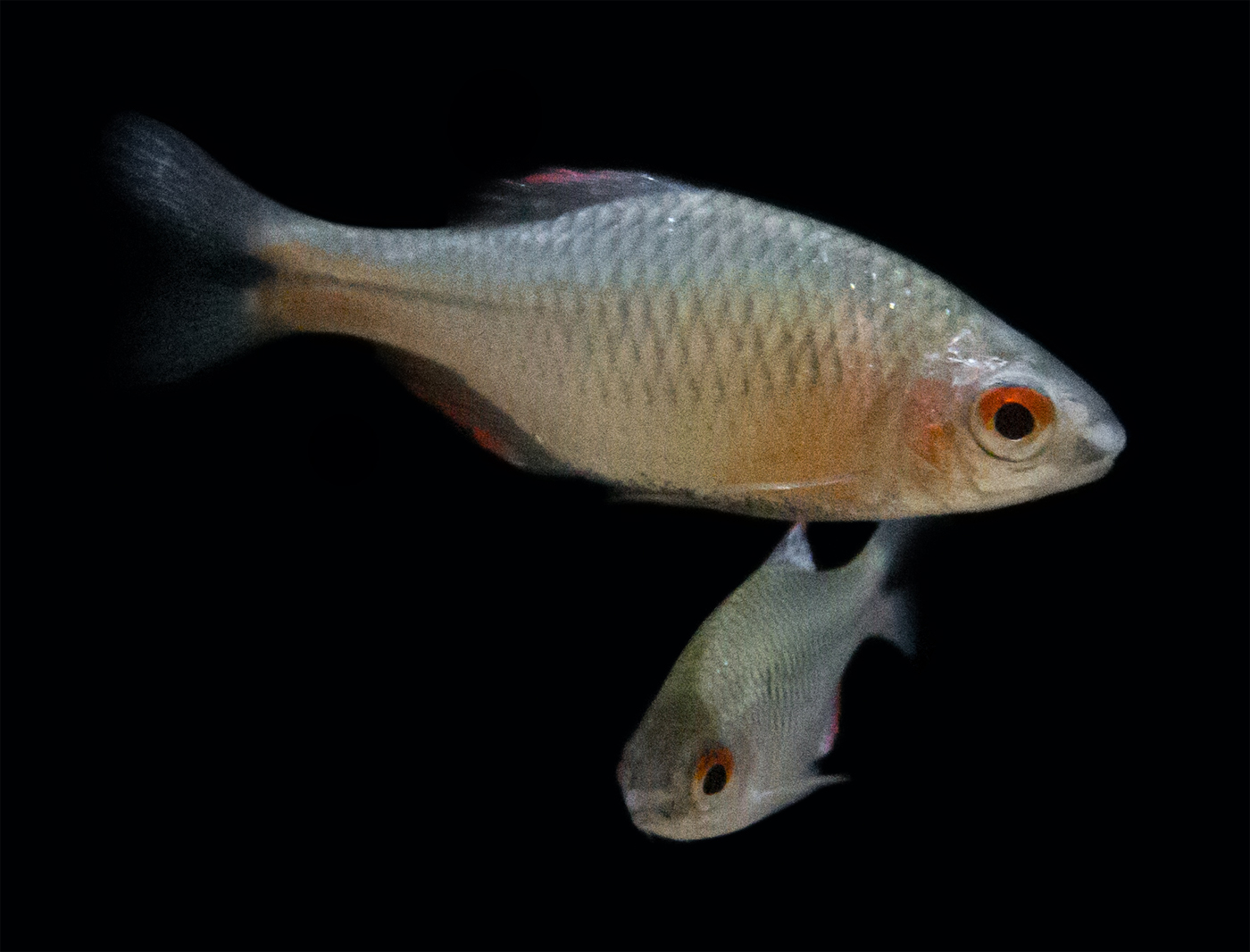

Scientific classification
- Kingdom: Animalia
- Phylum: Chordata
- Class: Actinopterygii
- Order: Cypriniformes
- Family: Acheilognathidae
- Genus: Paratanakia
- Species: P. himantegus

Binomial name
- Paratanakia himantegus (Günther, 1868)

Synonyms
- Achilognathus himantegus Günther, 1868; Tanakia himantegus (Günther, 1868); Paracheilognathus himantegus (Günther, 1868)

= Paratanakia himantegus =

Species of fish

Paratanakia himantegus is a species of ray-finned fish belonging to the family Acheilognathidae, the bitterlings. This fish is found in China and Taiwan.
