= Acheilognathus binidentatus =

Conservation status
- Data Deficient (IUCN 3.1)

Scientific classification
- Kingdom: Animalia
- Phylum: Chordata
- Class: Actinopterygii
- Order: Cypriniformes
- Family: Acheilognathidae
- Genus: Acheilognathus
- Species: A. binidentatus

Binomial name
- Acheilognathus binidentatus G. L. Li in Wang et al., 2001

Species of fish

Acheilognathus binidentatus is a species of freshwater ray-finned fish in the genus Acheilognathus,, a bitterling. It is endemic to China.
