= Acheilognathus fasciodorsalis =

Scientific classification
- Kingdom: Animalia
- Phylum: Chordata
- Class: Actinopterygii
- Division: Teleostei
- Order: Cypriniformes
- Suborder: Cyprinoidei
- Family: Acheilognathidae
- Genus: Acheilognathus
- Species: A. fasciodorsalis

Binomial name
- Acheilognathus fasciodorsalis V. H. Nguyễn, 2001

Species of fish

Acheilognathus fasciodorsalis is a species of freshwater ray-finned fish in the genus Acheilognathus, a bitterling. This fish is endemic to Vietnam.
