= Acheilognathus deignani =

Conservation status
- Data Deficient (IUCN 3.1)

Scientific classification
- Kingdom: Animalia
- Phylum: Chordata
- Class: Actinopterygii
- Order: Cypriniformes
- Suborder: Cyprinoidei
- Family: Acheilognathidae
- Genus: Acheilognathus
- Species: A. deignani

Binomial name
- Acheilognathus deignani (H. M. Smith, 1945)

Synonyms
- Acanthorhodeus deignani Smith, 1945

Species of fish

Acheilognathus deignani is a species of freshwater ray-finned fish in the genus Acheilognathus, a bitterling. It is endemic to northern Vietnam and Mekong River basin. It grows to a maximum length of 5.2 cm.

Named in honor of Herbert Girton Deignan (1906-1968), Associate Curator of Birds, U.S. National Museum, who collected the type specimen.
