= Acheilognathus striatus =

Conservation status
- Vulnerable (IUCN 3.1)

Scientific classification
- Kingdom: Animalia
- Phylum: Chordata
- Class: Actinopterygii
- Order: Cypriniformes
- Suborder: Cyprinoidei
- Family: Acheilognathidae
- Genus: Acheilognathus
- Species: A. striatus

Binomial name
- Acheilognathus striatus Qing Yang, B. X. Xiong, Q. Y. Tang & H. Z. Liu, 2010

Species of fish

Acheilognathus striatus is a species of freshwater ray-finned fish in the genus Acheilognathus, a bitterling. It is endemic to China, where it is found in the Le'an River in Jiangxi Province.
