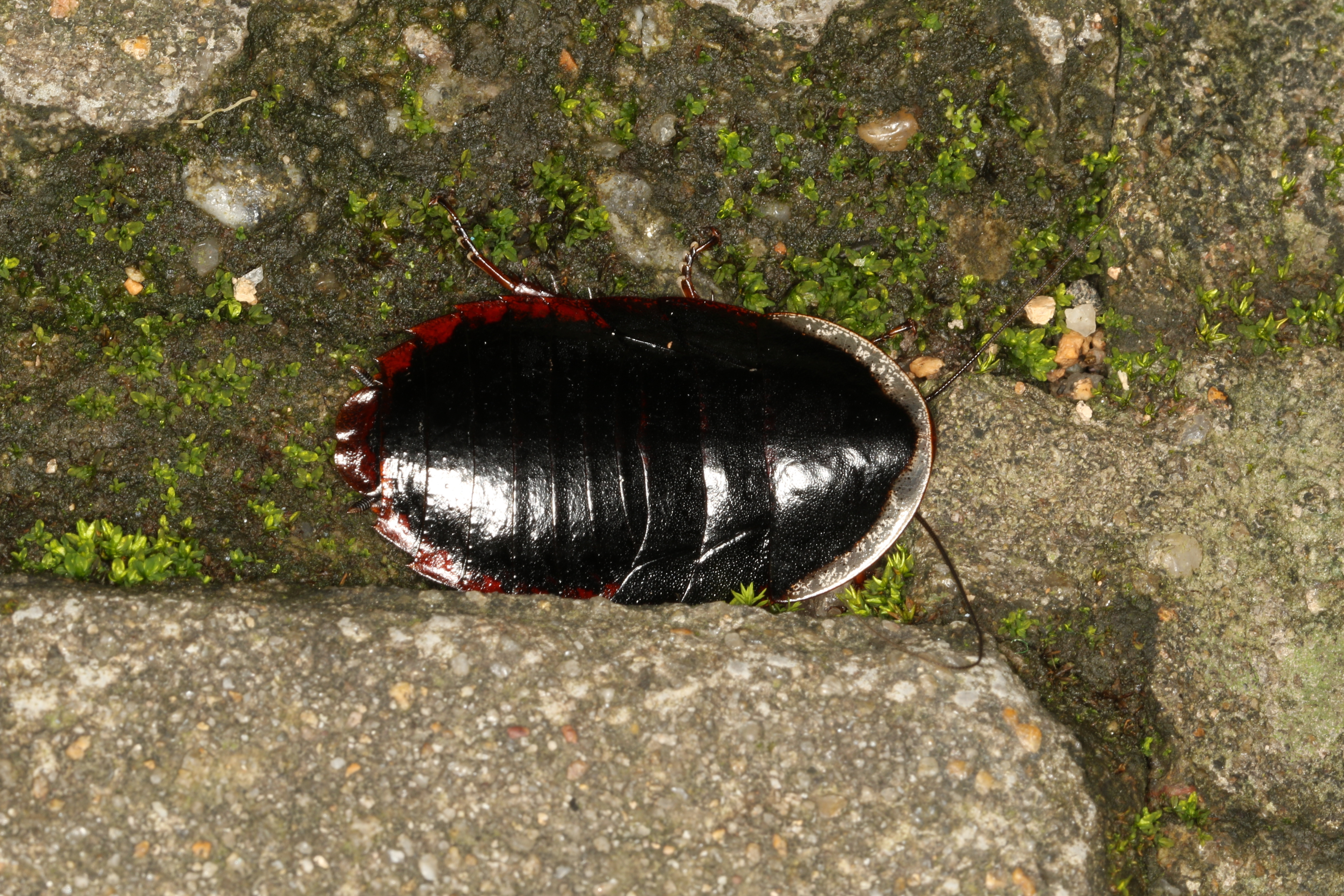
- Opisthoplatia orientalis

Scientific classification
- Kingdom: Animalia
- Phylum: Arthropoda
- Clade: Pancrustacea
- Class: Insecta
- Order: Blattodea
- Family: Blaberidae
- Subfamily: Epilamprinae
- Genus: Opisthoplatia; Brunner von Wattenwyl, 1865

= Opisthoplatia =

Genus of cockroaches

Opisthoplatia is a genus of cockroaches in the family Blaberidae. There are at least two described species in Opisthoplatia, found in south and east Asia, and Indomalaya.

The genus was monotypic until a species from the Philippines, Opisthoplatia beybienkoi, was described in 2005.

== Species ==
These two species belong to the genus Opisthoplatia:

- Opisthoplatia beybienkoi Anisyutkin, 2005
- Opisthoplatia orientalis (Burmeister, 1838) (amphibious litter roach)
