= Herbert Girton Deignan =

American ornithologist (1906–1968)

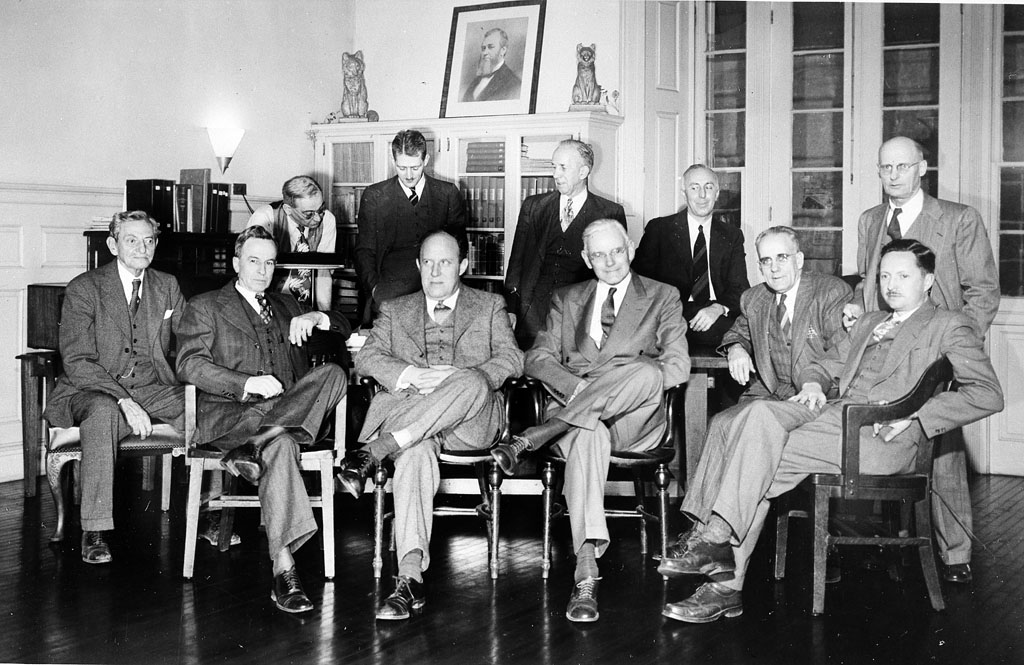
108th meeting of the Baird Ornithological Club in Holt House, the original administration building of the National Zoological Park on January 14, 1948. The club was named in honor of Spencer F. Baird, second Secretary of the Smithsonian (1878-1887) and noted ornithologist. Present are (seated, left to right) Paul Bartsch, Frederick C. Lincoln, Herbert Friedmann, Alexander Wetmore, Clarence Cottam, John Warren Aldrich, (standing, left to right) Director of the Zoo William M. Mann, Herbert Girton Deignan, Hartley H.T. Jackson, Philip Reese Uhler, and Ernest P. Walker.

Herbert Girton Deignan (December 5, 1906 – March 15, 1968) was an American ornithologist who worked extensively on the birds of Thailand.

Deignan was born in New Jersey, the son of Harry Francis and Anna Galena. He grew up in Pennsylvania and schooled in Mercersburg Academy before going to Princeton where he graduated with an Arts Baccalaureate in 1928. He became interested in birds early on and got in contact with Charles H Rogers, curator of the Princeton collections. He became interested in Thailand (Siam) and after graduating he took up a position in the Chiangmai college in northern Siam as a teacher of English. He stayed there from 1928 to 1932, collecting birds in the region that he sent back to Charles Rogers at Princeton.

Deignan returned to the United States in 1932. He held a temporary assignment at the US National Museum thanks to Alexander Wetmore. He then took a position at the Library of Congress from 1934 to 1935, and his familiarity with Asian languages helped index the catalogues of the library holdings in Sanskrit and Siamese. He returned to Chiangmai to take back his position and stayed from 1935 to 1937 during which time he amassed a large collection of birds for the United States National Museum (USNM). In 1938, he was appointed Scientific Aid in the Division of Birds at the USNM. He was promoted to Assistant Curator in 1940, Associate Curator in 1942, and Curator in 1959. Deignan retired in 1962.

Deignan married Stella Leche, a physical anthropologist.

Deignan became a member of the American Ornithologists' Union in 1923 and became a Life fellow in 1946 going on to serve as Secretary from 1959 to 1961. He published taxonomic revisions, collection catalogues and descriptions of birds from various parts of the world, especially Southeast Asia.

== Tribute ==
Acheilognathus deignani was named by Hugh McCormick Smith in 1945, in honor of Deignan, who had collected the type specimen.

Deignan is also commemorated in the scientific name of a species of Sri Lankan lizard, Lankascincus deignani named by Edward Harrison Taylor.
