= Sinorhodeus =

Conservation status
- Critically Endangered (IUCN 3.1)

Scientific classification
- Kingdom: Animalia
- Phylum: Chordata
- Class: Actinopterygii
- Order: Cypriniformes
- Suborder: Cyprinoidei
- Family: Acheilognathidae
- Genus: Sinorhodeus; Li, Liao & Arai, 2017
- Species: S. microlepis

Binomial name
- Sinorhodeus microlepis Li, Liao & Arai, 2017

Genus of fishes

Sinorhodeus is a monospecific genus of freshwater ray-finned fish belonging to the family Acheilognathidae, the bitterlings. The only species in the genus is Sinorhodeus microlepis, the volcano bitterling. A species found in the Yangtze river in Chongqing City, China, this species oviposits in the Asian clam (Corbicula fluminea), which is different from all other bitterling-like cyprinids which oviposit in freshwater mussels.

== Distribution ==
Sinorhodeus microlepis has a very narrow distribution range, and it is possibly endangered now.

== Description ==
This fish has a very large mouth and can prey on shrimps or tiny fish. Unlike other Acheilognathinae, Sinorhodeus microlepis has tiny scales on their body. Male in nuptial color are red, while at other times are wax yellow. The female's body colour is silver.

This species can be found in China aquarium trade, where it is called as the 'volcano bitterling'(火山鳑鲏) or 'Southwestern bitterling' (西南鳑鲏)
