= Paratanakia =

Scientific classification
- Kingdom: Animalia
- Phylum: Chordata
- Class: Actinopterygii
- Order: Cypriniformes
- Family: Acheilognathidae
- Genus: Paratanakia; Chang, Chen & Mayden, 2014

Type species
- Acheilognathus himantegus Günther, 1868

Genus of fishes

Paratanakia is a small genus of freshwater ray-finned fish belonging to the family Acheilognathidae, the bitterlings. The fishes in this genus are found in mainland China and Taiwan.

== Species ==
These are the current recognized species in this genus:

- Paratanakia chii (C. P. Miao, 1934)
- Paratanakia fulvidorsalis I.-S. Chen & J.-Y. Shy, 2024
- Paratanakia haifengensis S.-P. Huang, Y.-H. Cheng, Shao & I.-S. Chen, 2024
- Paratanakia himantegus (Günther, 1868)
- Paratanakia julongjiangensis I. S. Chen & J. Y. Shy, 2024
