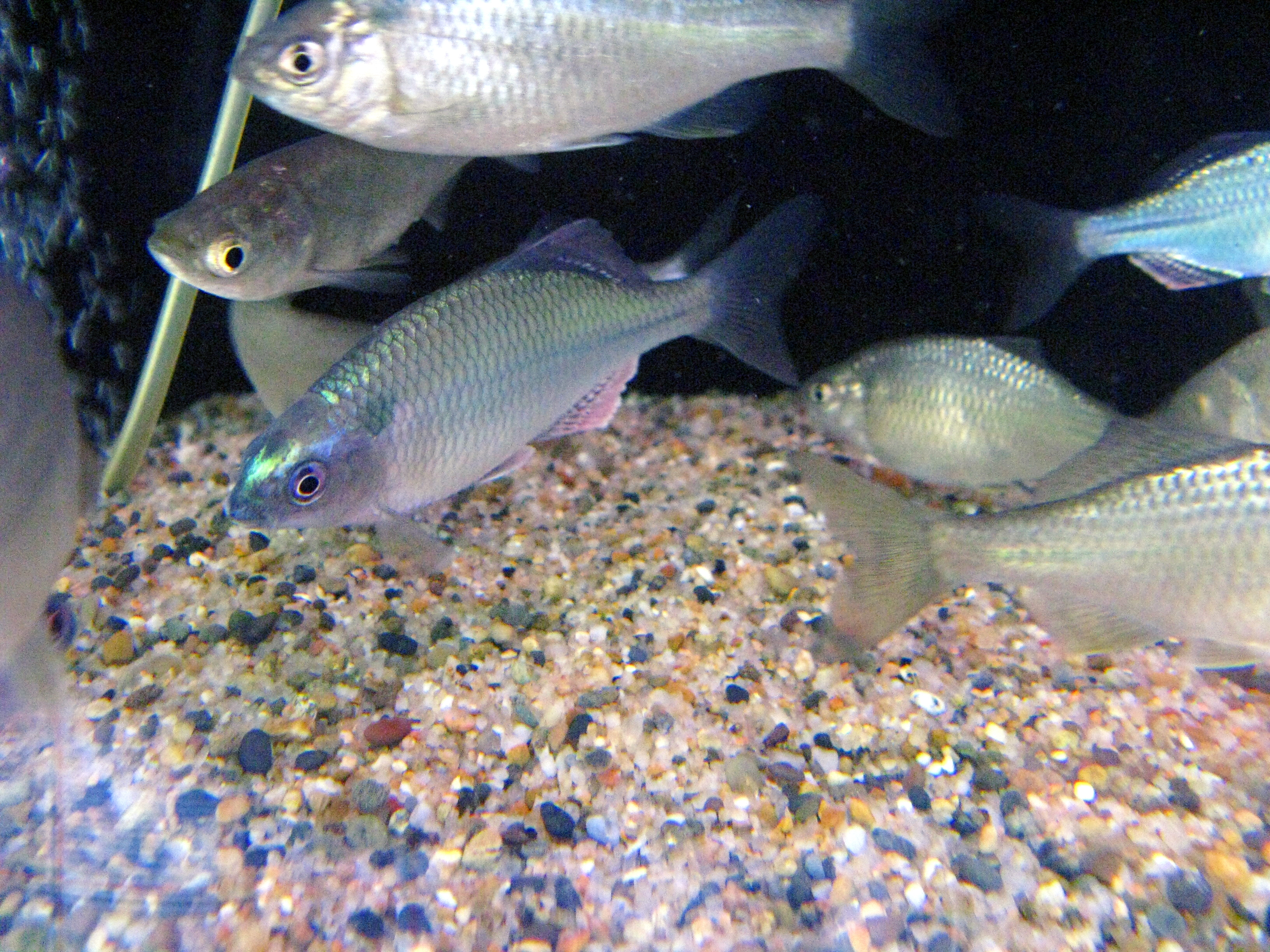
- Acheilognathus rhombeus

Scientific classification
- Kingdom: Animalia
- Phylum: Chordata
- Class: Actinopterygii
- Division: Teleostei
- Order: Cypriniformes
- Family: Acheilognathidae
- Genus: Acheilognathus; Bleeker, 1860

Type species
- Capoeta rhombea Temminck & Schlegel, 1846

Synonyms
- Pseudoperilampus Bleeker, 1863

= Acheilognathus =

Genus of fishes

Acheilognathus is a genus of freshwater ray-finned fishes belonging to the family Acheilognathidae, the bitterlings. The fishes in this genus are found in Asia. The name comes from the Ancient Greek ἀ- (á-), meaning "without", χεῖλος (kheîlos), meaning "lip", and γνάθος (gnáthos), meaning "jaw".

== Morphology ==
Fish of this genus range in length from 5 to 27 cm. They are similar in appearance to fishes of the genus Puntius.

== Species ==
These are the currently recognized species in this genus:

- Acheilognathus amurensis (Holčík, 1962)
- Acheilognathus asmussii (Dybowski, 1872) (Russian bitterling)
- Acheilognathus barbatulus Günther, 1873
- Acheilognathus barbatus Nichols, 1926
- Acheilognathus binidentatus G. L. Li 2001
- Acheilognathus brevicaudatus Y. R. Chen & Z. Y. Li, 1987
- Acheilognathus changtingensis Qing Yang, Y. R. Zhu, B. X. Xiong & H. Z. Liu, 2011
- Acheilognathus chankaensis (Dybowski, 1872) (Khanka spiny bitterling)
- Acheilognathus coreanus Steindachner, 1892
- Acheilognathus cyanostigma D. S. Jordan & Fowler, 1903 (Striped bitterling)
- Acheilognathus deignani (H. M. Smith, 1945)
- Acheilognathus elongatus (Regan, 1908) (Elongate bitterling)
- Acheilognathus fasciodorsalis V. H. Nguyễn, 2002
- Acheilognathus gracilis Nichols, 1926
- Acheilognathus guichenoti (Bleeker, 1871)
- Acheilognathus hypselonotus (Bleeker, 1871)
- Acheilognathus imberbis Günther, 1868
- Acheilognathus imfasciodorsalis V. H. Nguyễn, 2002
- Acheilognathus lanchiensis (Herre & S.-Y. Lin, 1936)
- Acheilognathus longibarbatus (Mai, 1978)
- Acheilognathus longipinnis Regan, 1905 (Deepbody bitterling)
- Acheilognathus longispinnis (Ōshima, 1926)
- Acheilognathus macromandibularis A. Doi, R. Arai & H. Z. Liu, 1999
- Acheilognathus macropterus (Bleeker, 1871)
- Acheilognathus majusculus I. S. Kim & H. Yang, 1998
- Acheilognathus melanogaster Bleeker, 1860 (Japanese bitterling)
- Acheilognathus mengyangensis Z. G. Chen, J. H. Gong & Y. S. Guo, 2021
- Acheilognathus meridianus (H. W. Wu, 1939)
- Acheilognathus microphysa J. X. Yang, X. L. Chu & Y. R. Chen, 1990
- Acheilognathus nanchongensis X. J. Deng, 1996
- Acheilognathus nguyenvanhaoi H. D. Nguyễn, Đ. H. Trần & T. T. Tạ, 2013
- Acheilognathus omeiensis (H. J. Shih & T. L. Tchang, 1934)
- Acheilognathus polylepis (H. W. Wu, 1964)
- Acheilognathus polyspinus (Holčík, 1972)
- Acheilognathus rhombeus (Temminck & Schlegel, 1846)
- Acheilognathus striatus Qing Yang, B. X. Xiong, Q. Y. Tang & H. Z. Liu, 2010
- Acheilognathus tabira D. S. Jordan & W. F. Thompson, 1914
- Acheilognathus tonkinensis (Vaillant 1892)
- Acheilognathus typus (Bleeker, 1863)
- Acheilognathus yamatsutae Mori, 1928

Synonyms

- Acheilognathus elongatoides Kottelat, 2001; valid as R. elongatus

In addition, there may be two undescribed species in Korea awaiting further study:

- Acheilognathus sp.
- Acheilognathus sp. HR
