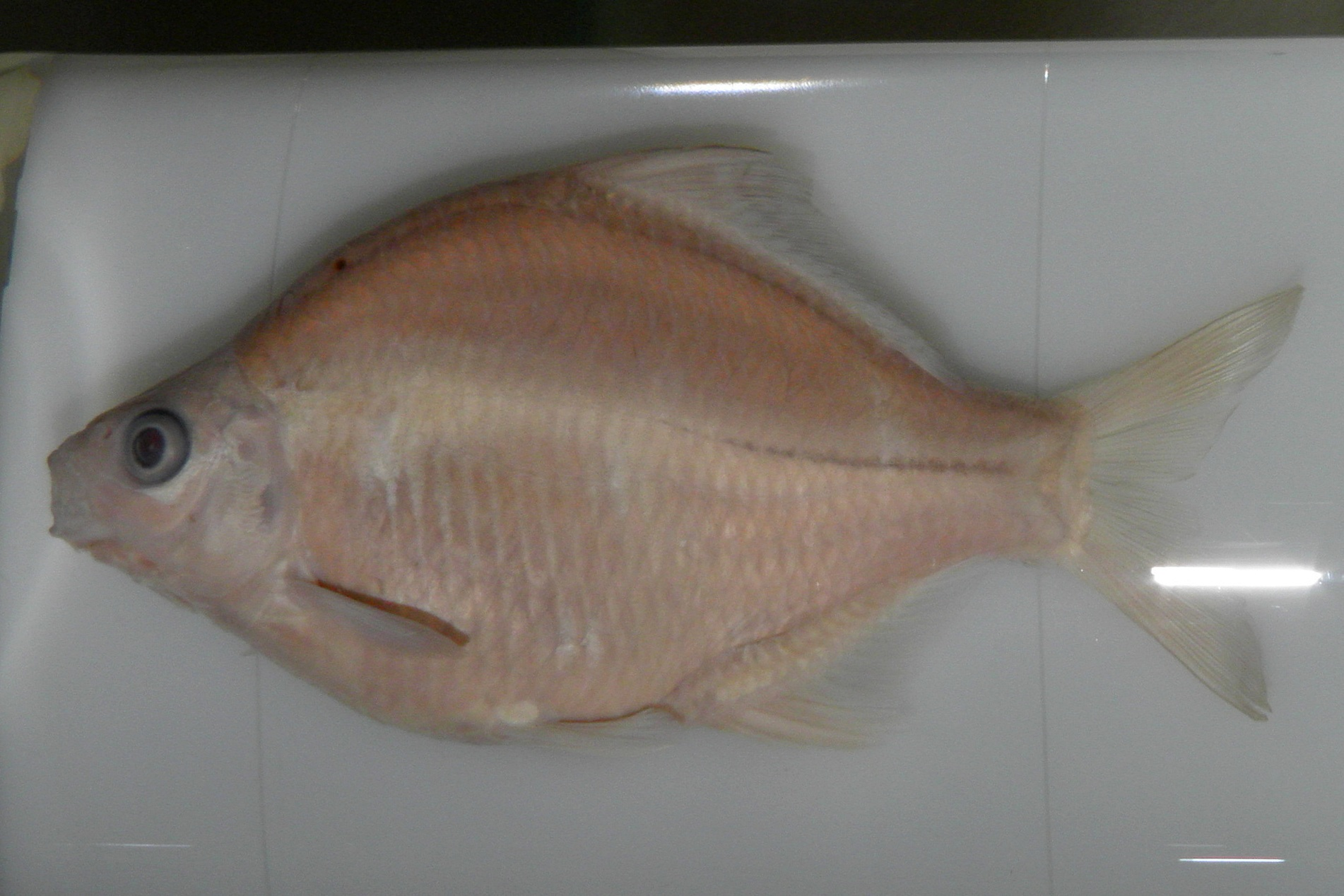

Conservation status
- Least Concern (IUCN 3.1)

Scientific classification
- Kingdom: Animalia
- Phylum: Chordata
- Class: Actinopterygii
- Order: Cypriniformes
- Family: Acheilognathidae
- Genus: Acheilognathus
- Species: A. chankaensis

Binomial name
- Acheilognathus chankaensis (Dybowski, 1872)

Synonyms
- Parachilognathus imberbis Bleeker, 1871; Devario chankanensis Dybowski, 1872; Acanthorhodeus chankaensis (Dybowski, 1872); Acanthorhodeus atranalis Günther, 1873; Paracheilognathus bleekeri Berg, 1907; Acanthorhodeus gracilis Regan, 1908; Acanthorhodeus wangi T. L. Tchang, 1930; Acanthorhodeus asmussi sungariensis Berg, 1931; Acanthorhodeus tokunagai Mori, 1934

= Khanka spiny bitterling =

Species of fish

The Khanka spiny bitterling (Acheilognathus chankaensis) is a temperate freshwater fish belonging to the family Acheilognathidae, the bitterlings. It originates in the inland rivers in Asia, and is found in China, Korea, and Russia.

The fish can grow up to 12 cm (4.7 in) in total length. It lives in a temperate climate in water with a pH of 7.0, a hardness of 15 DH, and a temperature range of 18 to 22 °C (64 to 72 °F). It is of commercial importance for fisheries and public aquaria.

When spawning, the female deposits the eggs inside bivalves. The young hatch and remain within the bivalve until they can swim.
