= Kyoto City Zoo =

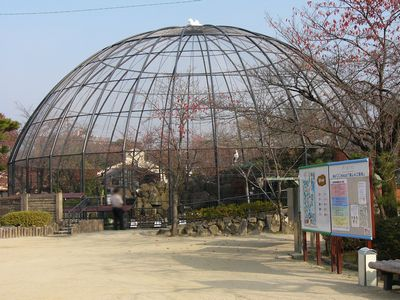
- Aviary at the zoo
- Interactive map of Kyoto City Zoo
- 35.012853°N 135.786006°E
- Date opened: 1903
- Location: Sakyō ward, Kyoto, Japan
- Land area: 4.1 ha (10 acres)
- No. of animals: 525 (2018)
- No. of species: 122 (2018)
- Memberships: World Association of Zoos and Aquariums
- Website: www5.city.kyoto.jp/zoo/lang/en

Kyoto City Zoo (京都市動物園) is a zoo located in Sakyō ward, Kyoto and was established in 1903, making it the second oldest zoo in the country after Ueno Zoo in Tokyo.

The Kyoto City Zoo is a member of the world Association of Zoos and Aquariums.

== History ==
Early years

The Kyoto Municipal Zoo was opened to the public on 1 April 1903 with 238 animals representing 61 species. The total area of the zoo was 3.4 hectares (8.4 acres), and the zoo had 6,591 visitors on its first day of operation.

A guide for the zoo was first published in 1905, and by its 10th birthday the zoo was home to 274 individuals representing 156 species.

In 1923, the zoo opened the Elephant Room and was able to move its elephants from temporary to permanent quarters. In 1927, the Hippopotamus Room was opened.

World War II

By 1940, the population of the zoo numbered 965 individuals representing 209 species. During the Second World War, large carnivores were killed by military order, and other animals died from hunger, malnutrition, and cold. At the end of the war, only 274 individuals of 72 species remained at the zoo. The South part of the zoo was taken over by the occupation forces, which did not leave the zoo until 1952.

The 1950s-90s

The Giraffe Room was opened in 1953, along with a saltwater aquarium (the aquarium was removed in 1968). In 1954, the Sea Lion Pond was completed, and the zoo held its first "Summer School," attended by 180 students. "Fairyland" was opened in 1955; an amusement park that now includes a Ferris wheel, fun train, and dodgem cars in the shape of popular cartoon and film characters. The Ape Room was built in 1969, and the Reptile Room in 1974.

The Red Panda Room was completed in 1980, and the dome aviary (Water Bird Pavilion) was completed in 1983. This aviary is 21 metres (69 ft) in diameter and 11 metres (36 ft) high in the center. Other exhibits completed in the 1980s include the Bird Room (1985), the Senow Room (1988), and the Kyotaro Room (1989 - now housing orangutans). 1989 saw the start of the wildlife rescue operation, though the Wildlife Rescue Center was not completed until 1990. The Beast Room was completed in 1993.

Recent history

In 2003, 100 years after its founding, the zoo was home to 721 individuals representing 175 species. The zoo completed the Monkey Room in 2004, and a new Ape Room, as well as a new East entrance, in 2009.

In 2005, facilities have redesigned.

== Animals ==
Mammals at the zoo include Asian elephants, brown capuchins, bush dogs, Cape hyraxes, chimpanzees, crested porcupines, Eurasian lynxes, fennec foxes, giraffes, Grévy's zebras, hippos, Indian flying foxes, Japanese badgers, Japanese black bears, Japanese giant flying squirrels, Japanese raccoon dogs, Japanese squirrels, lar gibbons, Linnaeus's two-toed sloths, mandrills, meerkats, pygmy slow lorises, red foxes, red pandas, rhesus macaques, ring-tailed lemurs, Senegal bushbabies, sika deer, South American tapirs, Tsushima leopard cats, and western lowland gorillas.

Birds at the zoo include American flamingos, ashy-faced owls, black-headed gulls, black-necked stilts, blue rock thrushes, brown-eared bulbuls, Buffon's macaws, burrowing owls, Chilean flamingos, common kestrels, common peafowl, common pochards, eastern spot-billed ducks, emus, Eurasian eagle-owls, Eurasian wigeons, falcated ducks, greater flamingos, green pheasants, helmeted guineafowl, Humboldt penguins, Japanese scops owls, Japanese tits, Japanese quails, lesser flamingos, mallards, mandarin ducks, northern bald ibises, peregrine falcons, red-crowned cranes, salmon-crested cockatoos, sarus cranes, scarlet macaws, snowy owls, spectacled owls, sulphur-crested cockatoos, tufted ducks, White's thrushes, and white-bellied green pigeons.

Reptiles, amphibians and fish at the zoo include African spurred tortoises, ball pythons, black-knobbed map turtles, dwarf crocodiles, elongated tortoises, green and black poison dart frogs, green tree pythons, Indian star tortoises, Indochinese box turtles, Japanese fire-bellied newts, Japanese giant salamanders, Japanese pond turtles, Japanese rat snakes, Japanese striped snakes, keeled box turtles, Kenyan sand boas, leopard geckos, New Guinea snake-necked turtles, painted turtles, pancake tortoises, radiated tortoises, red-bellied short-necked turtles, red-footed tortoises, Reeves's turtles, Réunion Island day geckos, striped bitterlings, western Japanese common toads, yellow-margined box turtles, and yellow-spotted river turtles.

== Other facilities ==
Animal data room

The Animal Data Room includes skeletons and other information about former residents of the zoo. It was started in 1982 with information about red pandas, and tiger information was added in 2010 (year of the tiger).

Children's zoo

A children's zoo opened in 1955, and lets visitors watch the animals from up close and even pet them. Animals in this area include rabbits, guinea pigs, miniature pigs, goats, tortoises, cockatoos, chickens, ducks, a donkey, a Ural owl, and rockhopper penguins.

== Wildlife rescue ==
The zoo includes a wildlife rescue center opened in 1989 and operated in cooperation with Kyoto Prefecture and Kyoto City. The center rehabilitates injured wildlife for release by the prefecture. The rescue center is not open to the public.

== Incidents and criticism ==
In 1932, a lion had to be shot dead after having escaped from the zoo.

In 2007, the animal welfare society "Animal Concerns Research and Education Society" conducted an investigation into the conditions of polar bears at the 24 Japanese Zoos that keep them, and found all, including the Kyoto Zoo, to be in violation of Canadian standards for animal care. The publication of their findings listed Kyoto Municipal Zoo as one of the facilities in which they found concerns.

In 2008, a zookeeper was killed by a tiger while cleaning its cage.
