= Melanogaster =

Melanogaster ("black-bellied") may refer to the following organisms:

- Genera:
  - Melanogaster (fungus), a genus of false truffles
  - Melanogaster (fly), a genus of hoverflies
- Species:
  - Drosophila melanogaster, a species of fruit fly, widespread and also important in research
  - Acheilognathus melanogaster, a species of brackish-freshwater ray-finned fish in Japan
  - Anhinga melanogaster, the Oriental darter (snakebird), a water bird of tropical South Asia and Southeast Asia
  - Turnix melanogaster, the black-breasted buttonquail (a rare bird in Australia)
