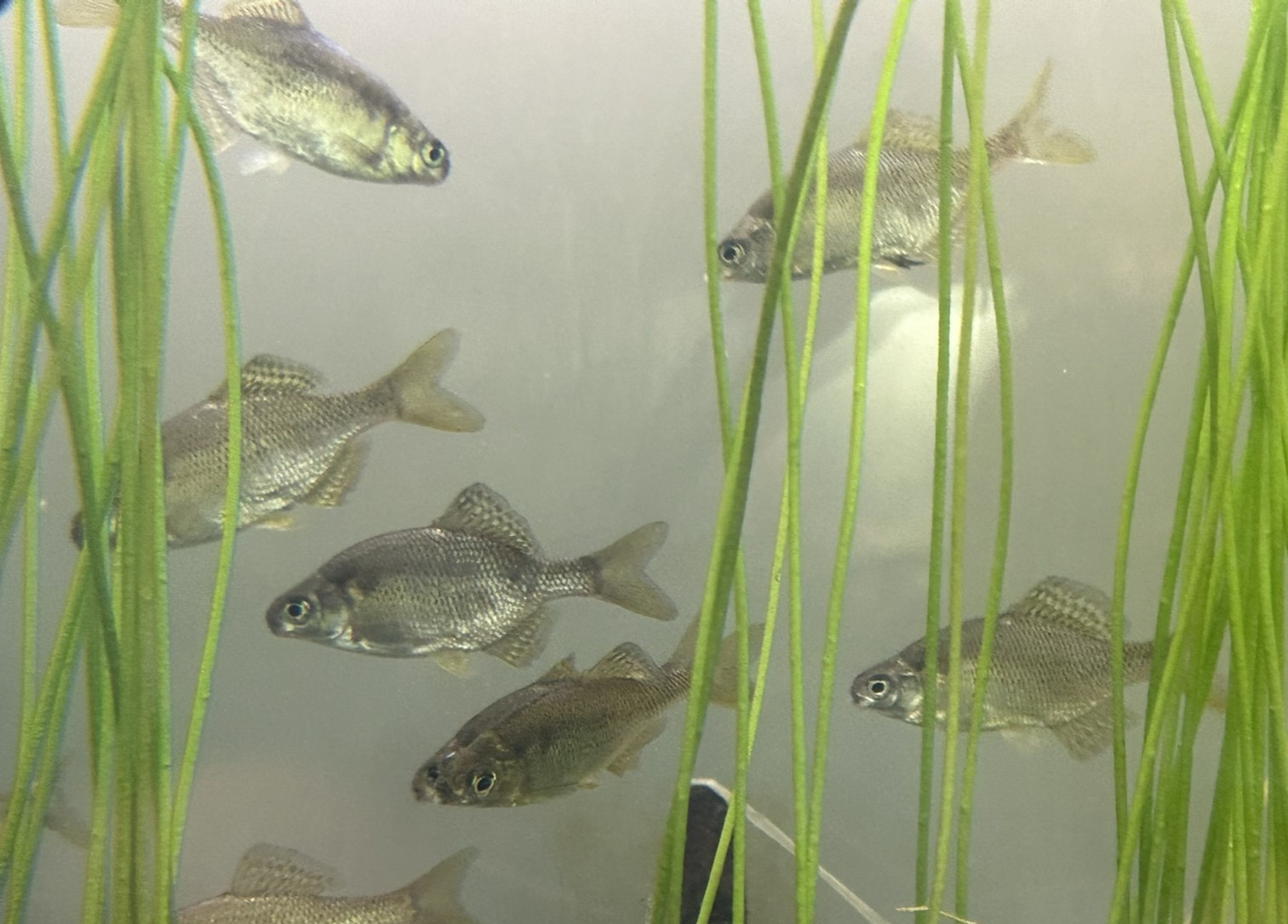
- At Tokyo Sea Life Park

Conservation status
- Endangered (IUCN 3.1)

Scientific classification
- Kingdom: Animalia
- Phylum: Chordata
- Class: Actinopterygii
- Order: Cypriniformes
- Suborder: Cyprinoidei
- Family: Acheilognathidae
- Genus: Acheilognathus
- Species: A. typus

Binomial name
- Acheilognathus typus (Bleeker, 1863)

Synonyms
- Pseudoperilampus typus Bleeker, 1863

= Acheilognathus typus =

Species of fish

Acheilognathus typus, the metallic bitterling, is a species of freshwater ray-finned fish in the family Acheilognathidae, a bitterling. It is endemic to Japan.
