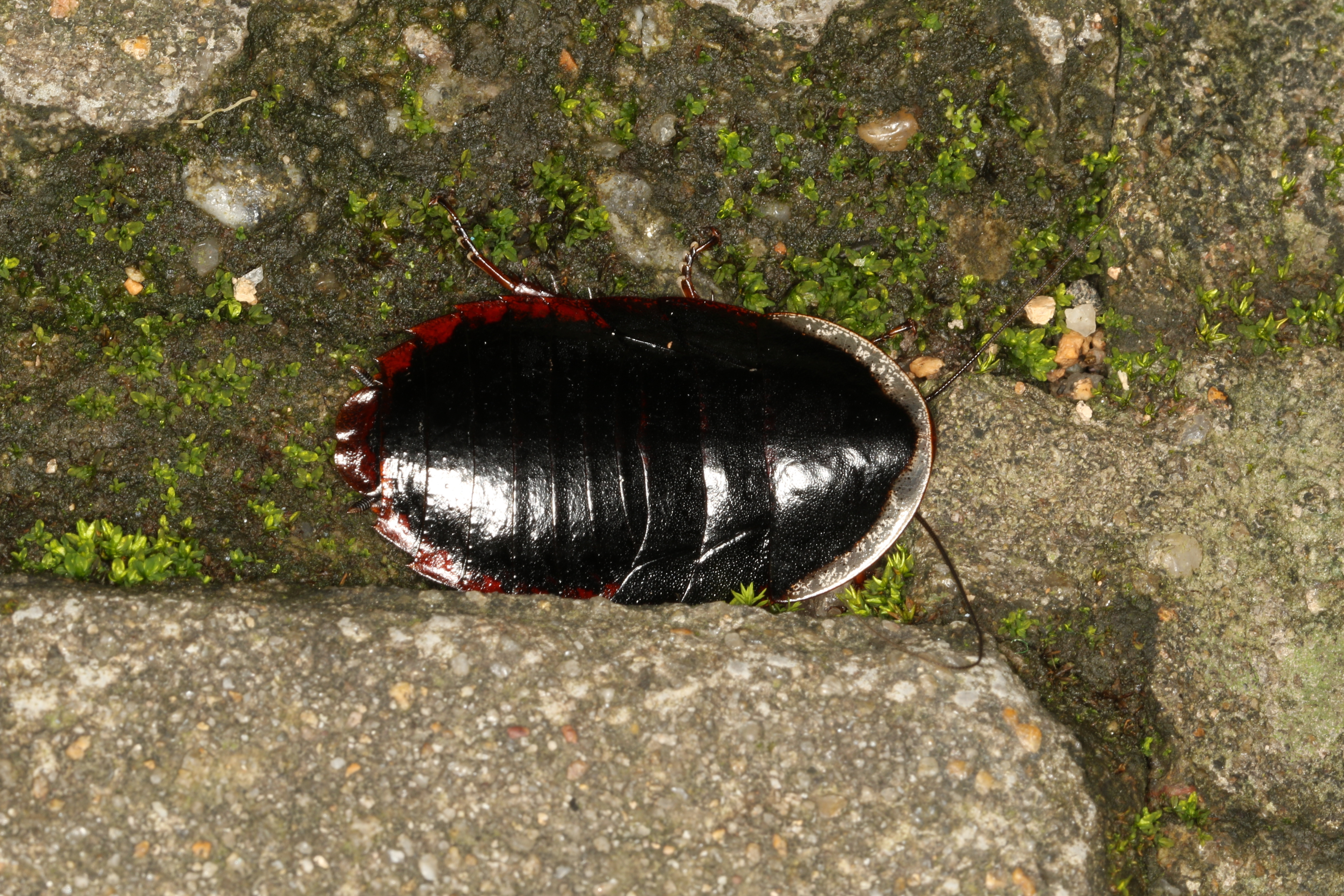

Scientific classification
- Kingdom: Animalia
- Phylum: Arthropoda
- Class: Insecta
- Order: Blattodea
- Family: Blaberidae
- Genus: Opisthoplatia
- Species: O. orientalis

Binomial name
- Opisthoplatia orientalis (Burmeister, 1838)

= Opisthoplatia orientalis =

Species of cockroach

Opisthoplatia orientalis is a species of cockroach of the genus Opisthoplatia, family Blaberidae, and order Blattodea. It is native to Southern and Eastern Asia including India, Indonesia, China, and Japan.
