= Acheilognathus macropterus =

Conservation status
- Data Deficient (IUCN 3.1)

Scientific classification
- Kingdom: Animalia
- Phylum: Chordata
- Class: Actinopterygii
- Order: Cypriniformes
- Suborder: Cyprinoidei
- Family: Acheilognathidae
- Genus: Acheilognathus
- Species: A. macropterus

Binomial name
- Acheilognathus macropterus (Bleeker, 1871)

Synonyms
- Acanthorhodeus macropterus Bleeker, 1871; Acanthorhodeus guichenoti Bleeker, 1871; Acanthorhodeus dicaeus Rutter, 1897; Acanthorhodeus bergi Mori, 1928; Acanthorhodeus ngowyangi T.-L. Tchang, 1930; Acanthorhodeus jeholicus Mori, 1934; Acanthorhodeus taenianalis Günther 1873; Acheilognathus taenianalis (Günther 1873)

Species of fish

Acheilognathus macropterus is a species of freshwater ray-finned fish belonging to the family Acheilognathidae, the bitterlings. This fish occurs in China and northern Vietnam. It grows to a length of 27.5 centimetres (10.8 in) SL.

== Taxonomy and etymology ==
Acheilognathus macropterus is the name given to this species from Greek words A (without), cheilo (lip), gnathus (jaw), Macro (long), and pterus (feather/wing) due to the fish within this genus only having a lateral, lip fold on the lower jaw and a long dorsal fin on the adult males. The common name for this species is Giant Chinese Bitterling because of its Chinese origin.

There are 39 other species relating to this species at the genus level.

== Genome ==
Mitochondrial genome was found using PCR amplification and DNA sequencing. The double stranded DNA is circular consisting of 13 protein-coding genes, 22 RNA transfer genes, two ribosomal RNA genes, and two main non-coding regions. The genetic composition is similar to other vertebrates and can be useful for future species identification and evolutionary correlations.

== Description ==
Males have longer rays in their dorsal and anal fins, and mating males have a pale pink metallic color, dark abdomen, breeding tubercles on snout, and white spots on anal-fin. Mating females are colorless with an anal-fin being yellow and an 80 mm (3.1 in) ovipositor. This species is only aggressive when breeding, and typically does well with fishes of the same size. This species specifically can grow up to 30 cm (12 in) in their ideal environment.

== Habitat ==
A. macropterus species thrives in freshwater and brackish water with a subtropical temperature of 15–25 °C (59–77 °F). It is not thought to be harmful to humans. Typically in slow moving sections of rivers and can adjust well to large bodies of water including man-made reservoirs.

== Life cycle ==
Females have an ovipositor, which is a tube-like organ used to lay eggs inside bivalves; aquatic molluscs having a hinged shell. The young remain inside the shell until able to swim and be on their own.

== Diet ==
A. macropterus is an omnivore that preys on insects, insect larvae, algae, and other vegetations. It has a broad diet, but A. macropterus prefers bloodworms, Daphnia spp., and Artemia spp .

== Impact ==
Both deliberate and accidental influence is seen with native fish species in Ibaraki, Japan, specifically bitterling organisms. Deliberate impact is due to the release of pet animals into the water and accidental impact is observed from hitchhiking and pearl bivalve for aquaculture.

== Distribution and invasiveness ==
Although native to China and Northern Vietnam, this species is also native to southeastern Russia. This species can also be found in the Korean peninsula natively.

=== Invasion of Japan ===
Some species of bitterlings are on the decline in Japan due to habitat loss and pollution of the bivalves where the young bitterlings remain before they are able to swim. The bitterling subfamily Acheilognathinae live in Japan with 17 species and subspecies, with one exotic subspecies. In Lake Kasumigaura in Japan, the species found was Acheilognathus macropterus in 2003 and in 2007 made up more than 80% of the bitterling population, therefore other native bitterlings were driven out due to the increase in Acheilognathus macropterus. The increase in this non-native species within the Ibaraki region can be explained by the utilization of the freshwater pearl mussel that could be potentially helping Acheilognathus macropterus invade.
