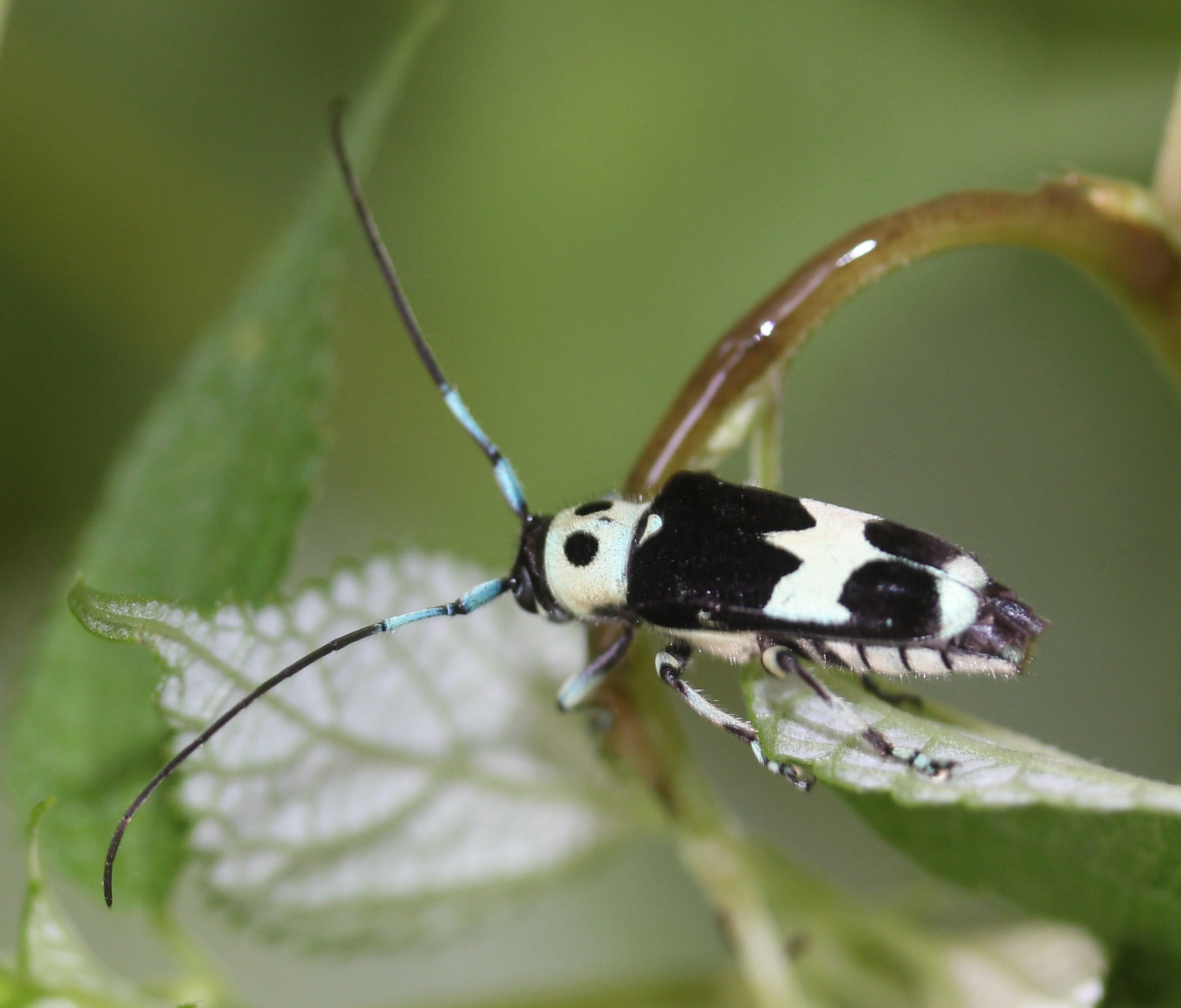

Scientific classification
- Domain: Eukaryota
- Kingdom: Animalia
- Phylum: Arthropoda
- Class: Insecta
- Order: Coleoptera
- Suborder: Polyphaga
- Infraorder: Cucujiformia
- Family: Cerambycidae
- Genus: Paraglenea
- Species: P. fortunei

Binomial name
- Paraglenea fortunei (Saunders, 1853)

Synonyms
- Glenea fortunei Saunders, 1853; Stibara fortunei (Saunders) Thomson, 1857

= Paraglenea fortunei =

Species of beetle

Paraglenea fortunei is a species of beetle in the family Cerambycidae. It was described by Saunders in 1853, originally under the genus Glenea. It is known from Taiwan, China, North Korea, South Korea, and Vietnam, and has been introduced into Japan. It feeds on Cinnamomum camphora, Boehmeria nivea, Hibiscus syriacus, Morus alba, and Triadica sebifera.

== Varietas ==
- Paraglenea fortunei var. chloromelas Thomson, 1879
- Paraglenea fortunei var. bisbinotata Pic, 1915
- Paraglenea fortunei var. clarevittata Breuning, 1952
- Paraglenea fortunei var. cojunctofaciata Breuning, 1952
- Paraglenea fortunei var. savioi Pic, 1923
- Paraglenea fortunei var. innotaticollis Pic, 1936
- Paraglenea fortunei var. notatipennis Pic, 1914
- Paraglenea fortunei var. pubescens Pic, 1914
- Paraglenea fortunei var. soluta Ganglbauer, 1887
- Paraglenea fortunei var. unicoloripennis Breuning, 1952
- Paraglenea fortunei var. viridicollis Breuning, 1952
- Paraglenea fortunei var. fasciata Pic, 1915
- Paraglenea fortunei var. innotata Pic, 1915
