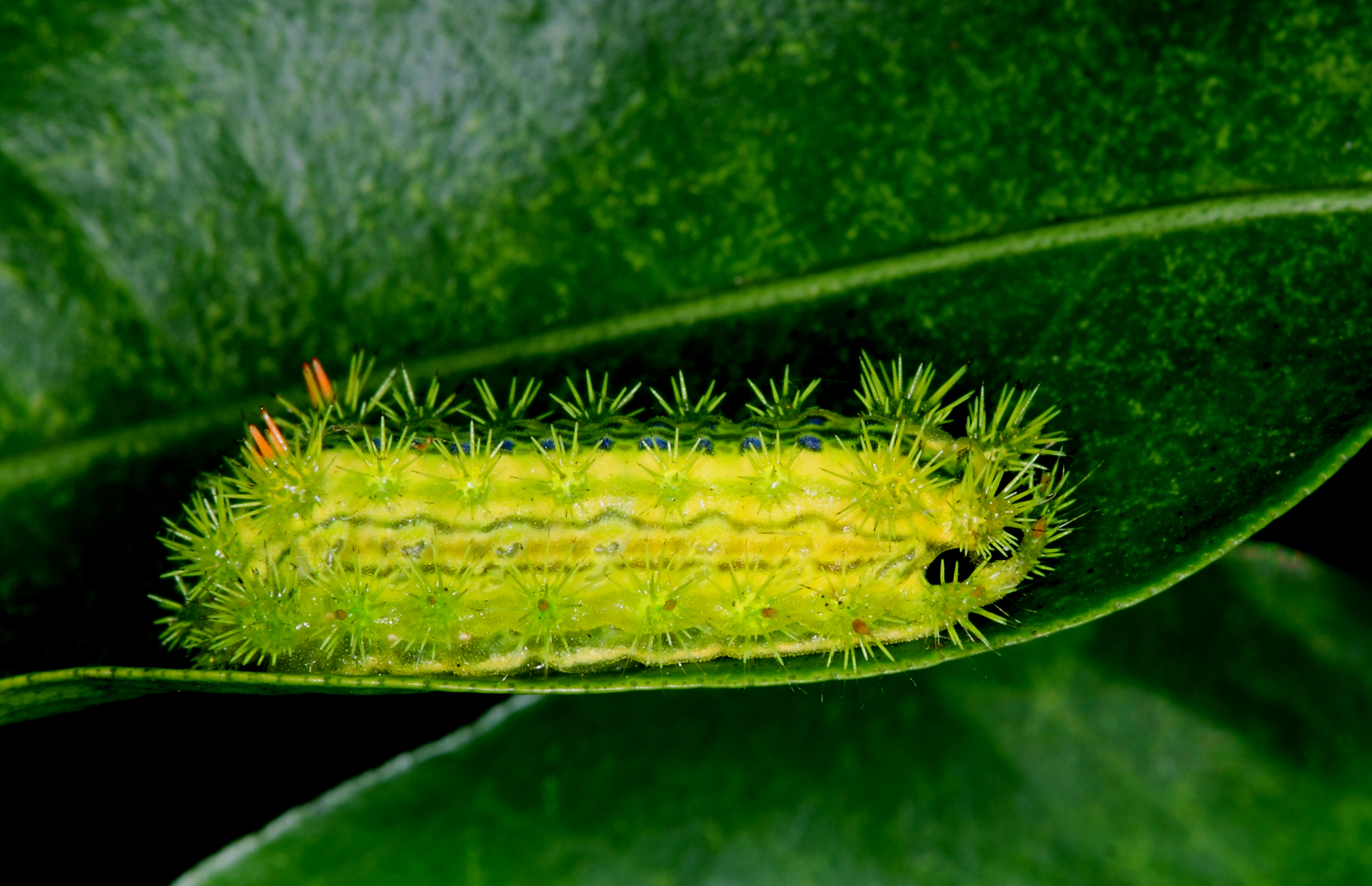
- Larva
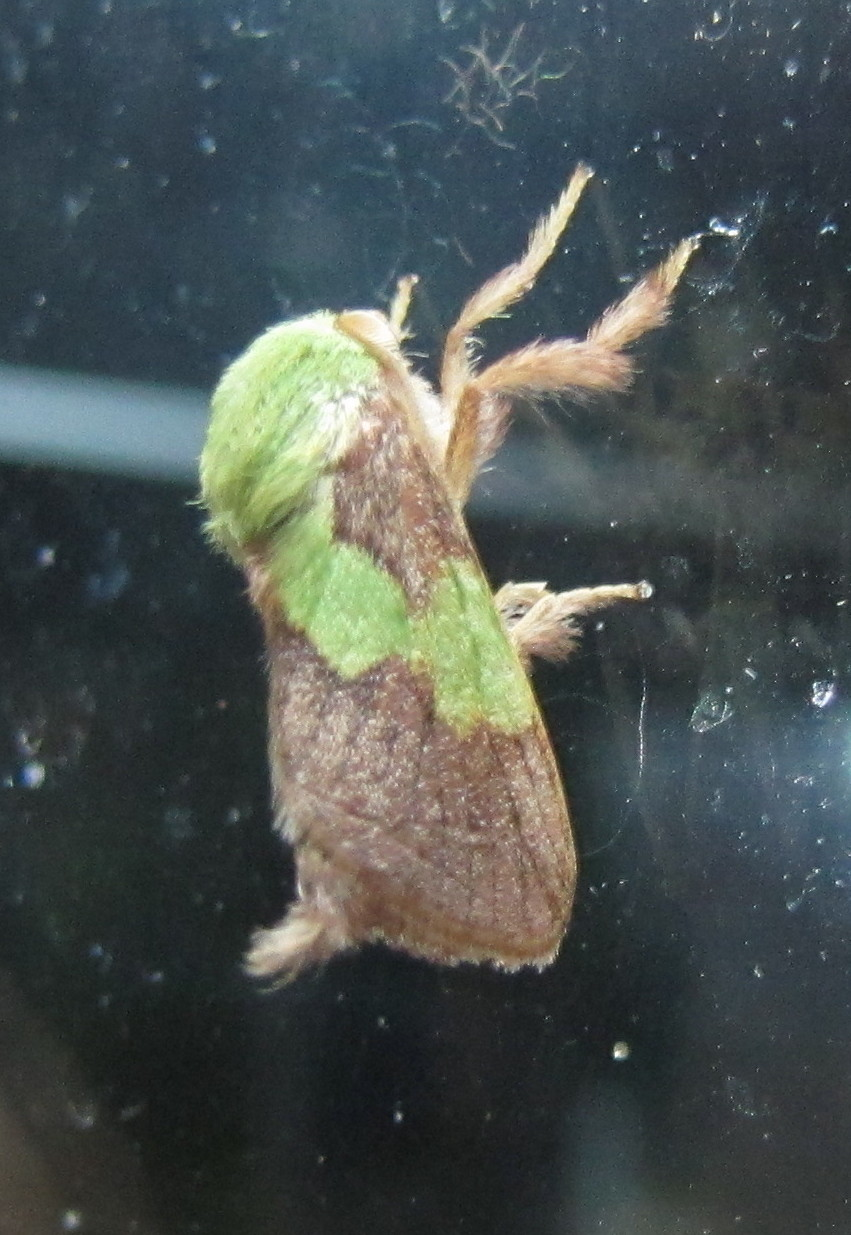
- Adult

Scientific classification
- Kingdom: Animalia
- Phylum: Arthropoda
- Class: Insecta
- Order: Lepidoptera
- Family: Limacodidae
- Genus: Parasa
- Species: P. lepida

Binomial name
- Parasa lepida (Cramer, 1799)

Synonyms
- Noctua lepida Cramer, 1799; Latoia lepida (Cramer, 1799); Limacodes graciosa Westwood, 1848; Nyssia latitascia Walker, 1855; Neaera media Walker, 1855; Parasa lepida lepidula Hering, 1933

= Parasa lepida =

Species of moth

Parasa lepida, the nettle caterpillar or blue-striped nettle grub, is a moth of the family Limacodidae that was described by Pieter Cramer in 1799. It is a native minor pest found in the Indo-Malayan region, including India, Sri Lanka, Vietnam, Malaysia and Indonesia. It is an introduced pest to urban trees in western Japan.

== Description ==
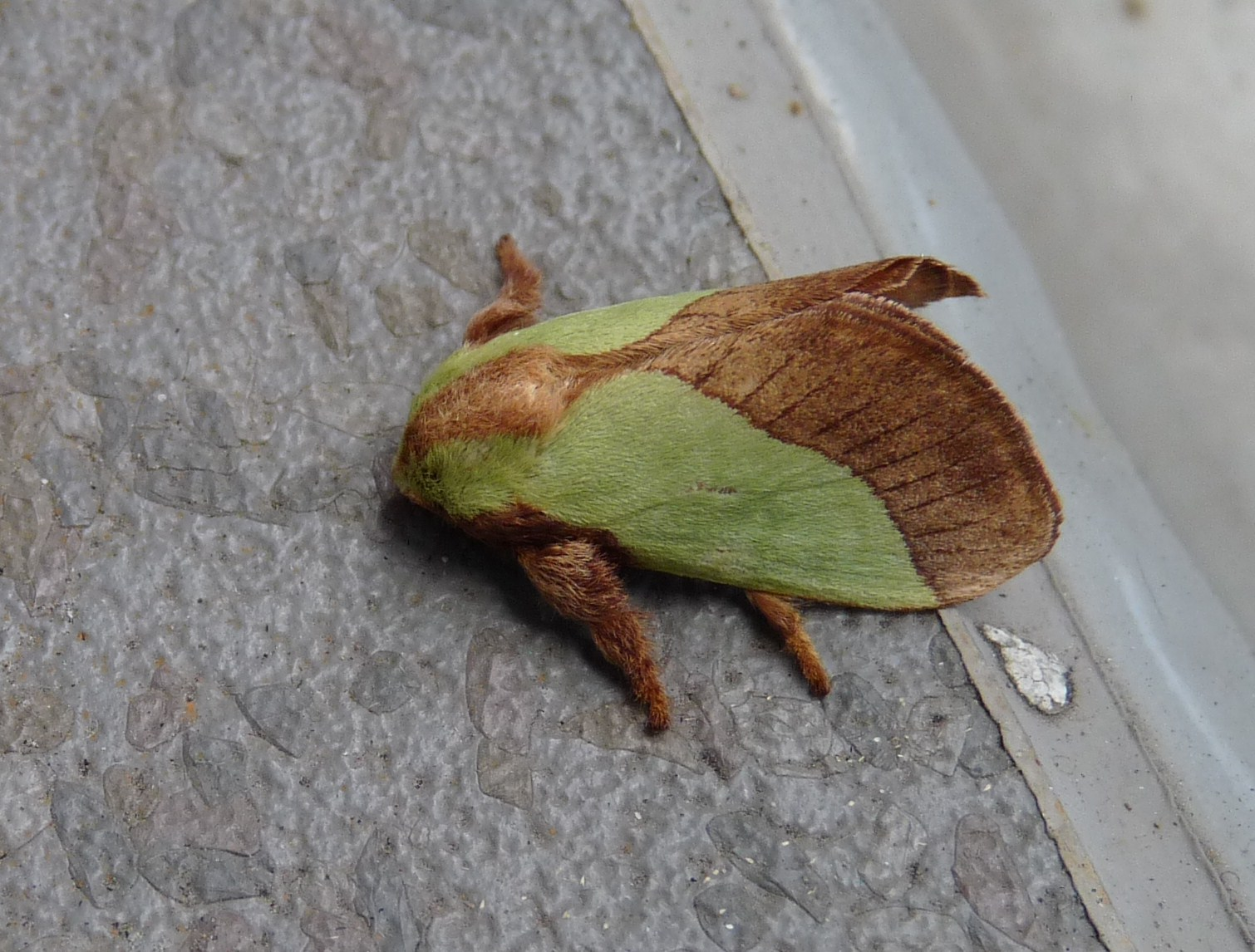
Adult of Parasa lepida

In the male, the head is greenish, with red brown at the sides. The thorax is green with a brown stripe on the vertex. Abdomen brown. Forewings are pale green, resembling the colour of a pea plant. There is a red-brown basal patch on the costa. Outer area is reddish brown, widest at inner margin. Hindwing yellowish at base, reddish brown towards margin. Legs have pale tipped joints. In the female, the reddish-brown stripe on the thorax is much wider and nearly the whole of the hindwing is reddish brown. Larva pale green, whitish or bright yellowish green on the dorsal surface. There are three green bands throughout the body. Sub-dorsal and sub-lateral series of short spinous tubercles, the spines of the anterior and posterior tubercles tipped with red. Cocoon purple brown. Eggs are flat and overlap each other. Eggs are covered by a transparent cement.

== Ecology ==
The egg stage lasted six days, the larval stage forty days and the pupal stage twenty-two days, may fluctuate with climatic changes. The larvae are considered pests and have been recorded from commercial crops like coffee, rubber, oil palm, cocoa, cassava, tea, ebony, coconut, gliricidia, banana, winged bean and mango. The female is known to emit pheromone (Z)-7,9-Decadien-1-ol as a semiochemical.

The cuckoo wasp, Chrysis shanghaiensis is a known parasite on the caterpillars. In August 1986, dead larvae were found on coconut leaves from India. Experiments showed that, multiple embedded baculovirus is the causative agent for the disease.
