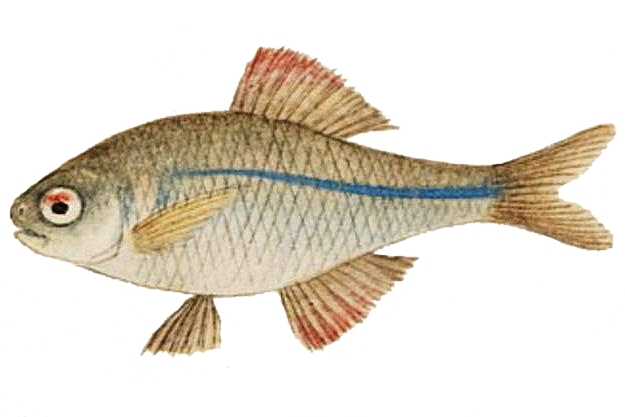

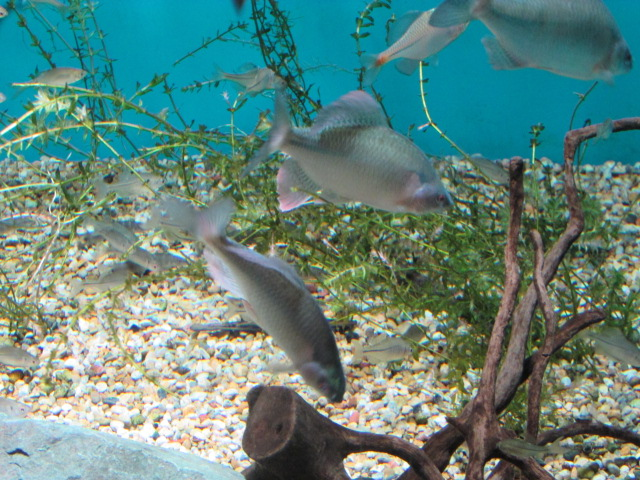

Scientific classification
- Kingdom: Animalia
- Phylum: Chordata
- Class: Actinopterygii
- Order: Cypriniformes
- Suborder: Cyprinoidei
- Family: Acheilognathidae
- Genus: Acheilognathus
- Species: A. rhombeus

Binomial name
- Acheilognathus rhombeus (Temminck & Schlegel, 1846)

Synonyms
- Capoeta rhombea Temminck & Schlegel, 1846; Acheilognathus steenackeri Sauvage, 1883

= Acheilognathus rhombeus =

Species of fish

Acheilognathus rhombeus is a temperate freshwater fish belonging to the family Acheilognathidae, the bitterlings. It originates in Japan and the Korean Peninsula. It was originally described as Capoeta rhombea by Temminck & Schlegel in 1846. It is the type species for the genus Acheilognathus.

When spawning, the females deposit their eggs inside bivalves, where they hatch and the young remain until they can swim.
