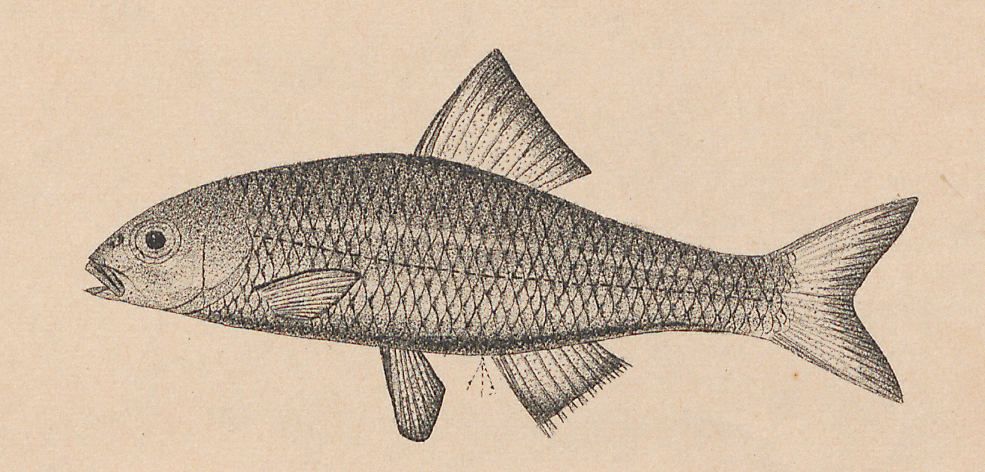

Conservation status
- Vulnerable (IUCN 3.1)

Scientific classification
- Kingdom: Animalia
- Phylum: Chordata
- Class: Actinopterygii
- Order: Cypriniformes
- Suborder: Cyprinoidei
- Family: Acheilognathidae
- Genus: Acheilognathus
- Species: A. melanogaster

Binomial name
- Acheilognathus melanogaster Bleeker, 1860

Synonyms
- Acheilognathus moriokae D. S. Jordan & W,. F. Thompson, 1914

= Acheilognathus melanogaster =

Species of fish

Acheilognathus melanogaster, the genuine bitterling or Japanese bitterling, is a species of brackish, freshwater ray-finned fish in the genus Acheilognathus. It is endemic to Japan.
