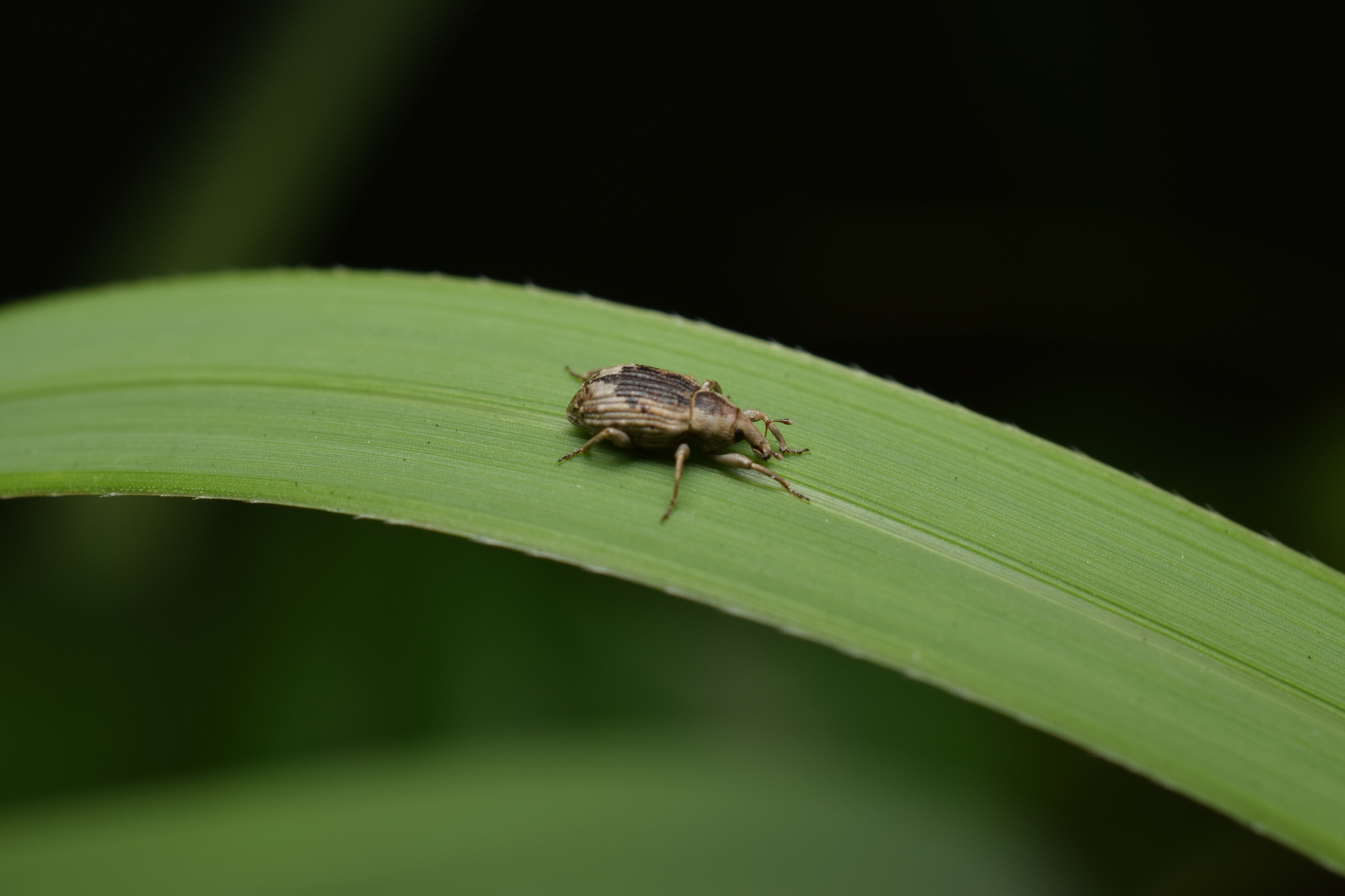

Scientific classification
- Kingdom: Animalia
- Phylum: Arthropoda
- Clade: Pancrustacea
- Class: Insecta
- Order: Coleoptera
- Suborder: Polyphaga
- Infraorder: Cucujiformia
- Superfamily: Curculionoidea
- Family: Brachyceridae
- Genus: Lissorhoptrus
- Species: L. oryzophilus

Binomial name
- Lissorhoptrus oryzophilus Kuschel, 1951

= Lissorhoptrus oryzophilus =

Species of beetle

Lissorhoptrus oryzophilus is an insect belonging to the order Coleoptera. It is native to North America, mostly in the southeastern part of the country, but has been established in California for over 50 years. A separate species of rice water weevil, Lissorhoptrus brevirostris is present in Cuba, Dominican Republic, Colombia, Suriname and Venezuela. Lissorhoptrus oryzophilus began spreading through the rice growing regions of Asia in 1976 (China, India, Japan, Korea and Taiwan); in Europe it has been present in Italy since 2004, in the regions of the Piedmont and Lombardy where it affects upland rice production

== Description of life stages ==
The pearly white eggs are cylindrical (0.8 mm long and 0.14 mm long) of pearly with a very thin corion. The eggs are laid in the leaf sheath and sometimes in the roots. Larvae hatch from eggs after 4–9 days.

The larvae are aquatic and live their entire lives in the rhizosphere. They are white and grow up to 1 cm long at 4th instar stage. The larvae survive in the anoxic zone by using modified spiracles that are shaped as dorsal hooks connected to the tracheal system. These hooks are penetrate into the aerenchyma cells of rice plants and other wetland grasses for respiration. The larvae go through 4 instars (or stadia) and complete development in about 28–35 days. The pupae is a small silk cocoon encased in mud (0.5-0.9 cm long) and attached to the roots. The pupal stage takes around 7 days to complete.

The adults are 3.3-3.7 mm long, including the rostrum. The exoskeleton ranges in color from dark beige, brown, or dark-brown. Along the center of the elytra, some rice water weevils have an elongated dark brown to brownish-black mark. The middle pair of legs have hydrophobic hairs that allow it to swim (Hix et al. 2000).

== Biology ==
Rice water weevils go through 1 generation in Japan and California, but in parts of southern China and the southern US they will undergo up to 3-4 generations per year. The adults feed on leaves and the sheath leaving diagnostic feeding scars which can help gauge the severity of an infestation. the adults will lay eggs beginning in March through May depending on the latitude. The larvae feed on the roots, which is the cause of yield reduction in rice. The loss of roots, reduces the number of plant tillers, which are the panicle bearing structures of the rice plant. Reduction in tillering leads directly to yield loss. In case of strong infestations yield losses can reach 30%.

The adult undergo diapause during the winter from November through March at the foot of perennial grasses or under vegetative cover. When the temperatures overcome the 21 °C, they migrate toward the rice fields either by crawling off levies or flying into fields. Adults are most active in the late afternoon or evening when temperatures are higher than 26 °C and wind speeds are less than 5 mph.

== Monitoring and management ==
Rice water weevils can be monitored by examining field edges for leaf scarring. Adult populations can be estimated using floating barrier traps. The best way to quantify populations of rice water weevil that can be directly related to yield losses is through soil coring (Way and Espino 2014).

Managing rice water weevil depends on the region and its ecology. In the Southern US, growers use drill seeded systems that allow them to delay planting or flooding of the rice fields. This allows rice plants to grow larger and better tolerate rice water weevils. Southern rice growers also use seed treatments with thiamethoxam (Cruiser) that also help In California, the best methods are treating field edges, rebuilding levees, winter flooding, and foliar spraying with pyrethroids such as lambda-cyhalothrin (Warrior) or neonicotinoids such as clothianidin (Belay). The spraying of insecticides is the cheapest option available to growers.

Host plant resistance has been investigated in rice but results have been less than desirable. Since the 1960s, out of 10,000 lines tested, only 2 showed moderate resistance to rice water weevil feeding. The 2 lines had poor agronomic traits, which led to their discontinued use.
