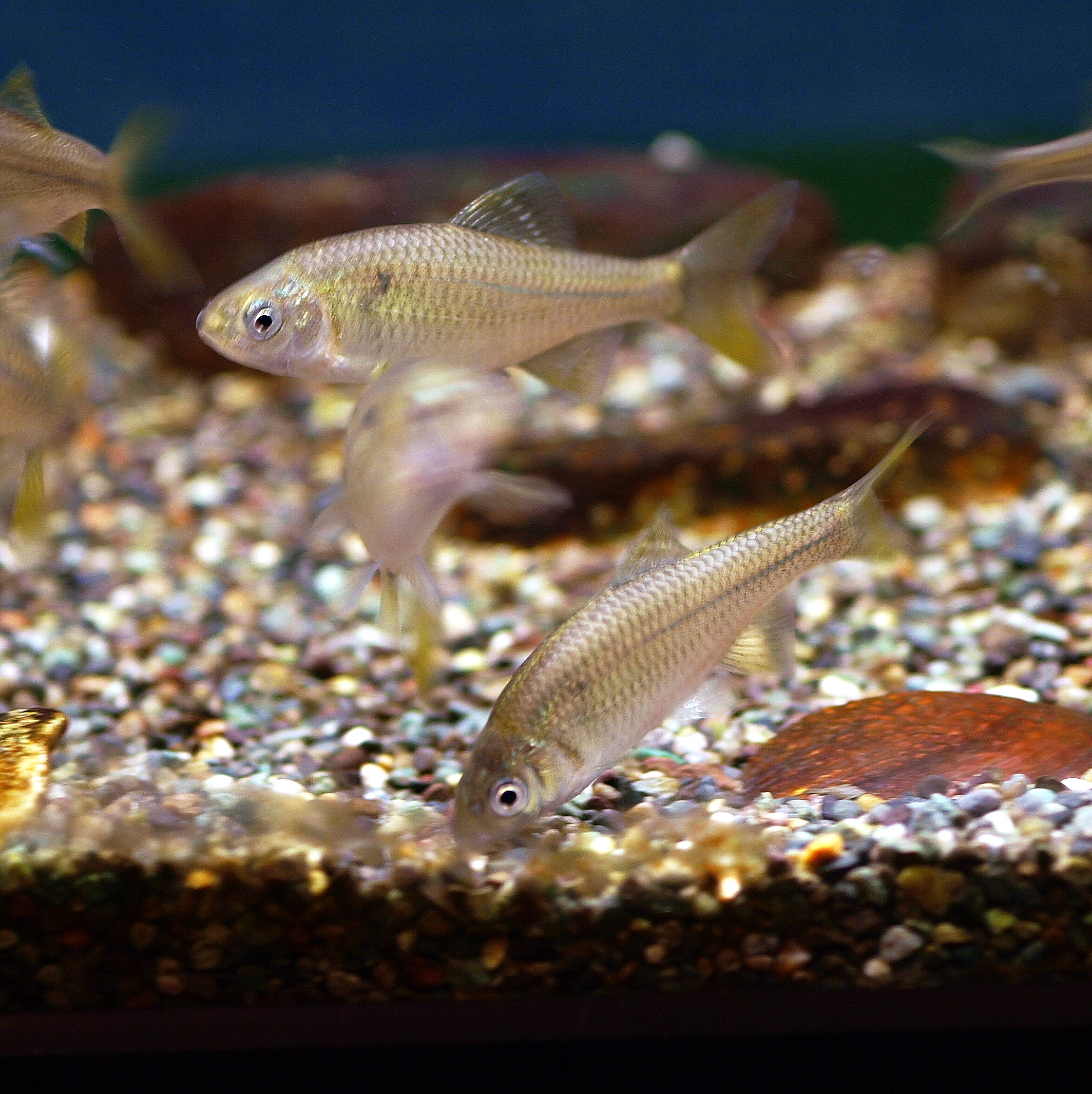

Conservation status
- Endangered (IUCN 3.1)

Scientific classification
- Kingdom: Animalia
- Phylum: Chordata
- Class: Actinopterygii
- Order: Cypriniformes
- Suborder: Cyprinoidei
- Family: Acheilognathidae
- Genus: Acheilognathus
- Species: A. cyanostigma

Binomial name
- Acheilognathus cyanostigma D. S. Jordan & Fowlera, 1903

= Striped bitterling =

Species of fish

The striped bitterling (Acheilognathus cyanostigma) is a species of freshwater ray-finned fish in the genus Acheilognathus. It is endemic to Lake Biwa and Lake Yogo in Japan. It typically grows to a length of 6.0 cm.

The reproduction for the creation of the Kyushu bitterling happens with the Mussel as their eggs spawning substrate which is also a species living in freshwater habitats. While in spawning season the father protects the area around the chosen mussel as the mom proceeds to lay her eggs in the inhalent siphon of the mussel. The father will late find his time to release his sperm as well and for a month the sperm released will be carried by the water going through the filter process in the mussel into the eggs for the development of life.
