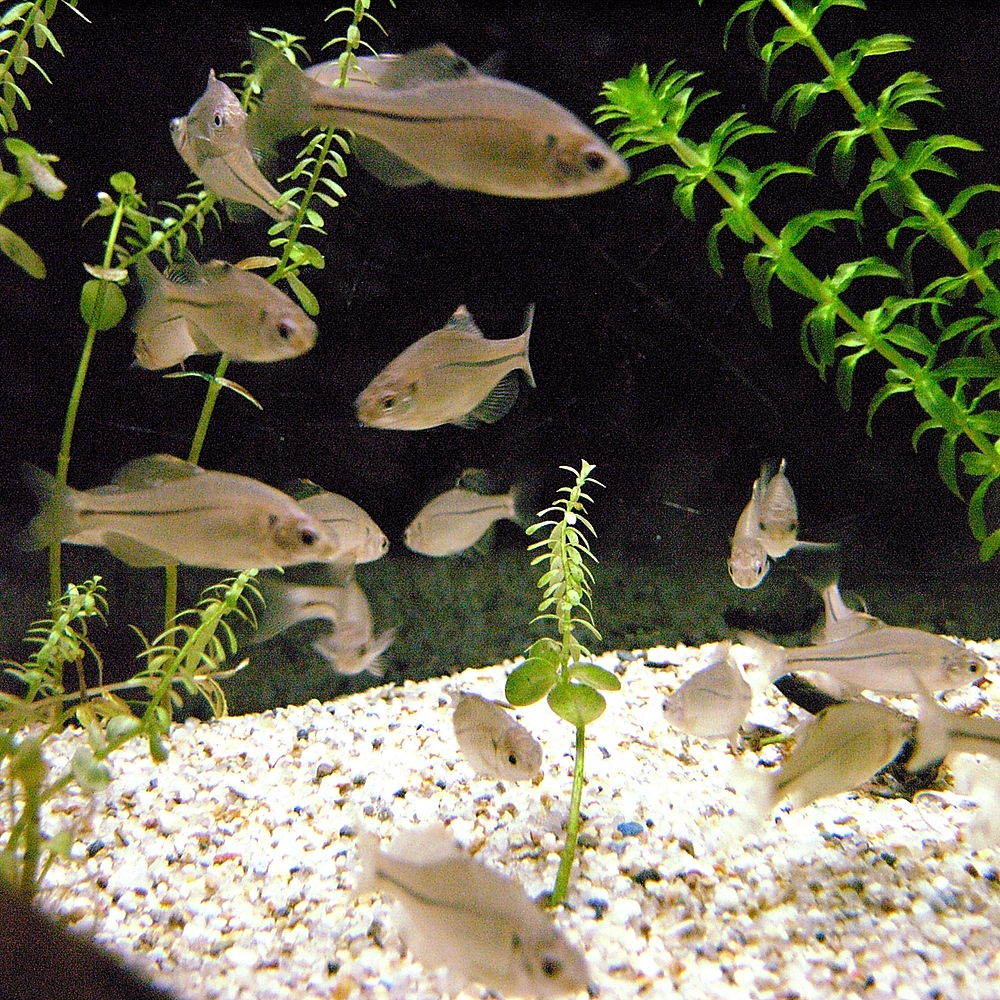
- Rhodeus suigensis

Scientific classification
- Kingdom: Animalia
- Phylum: Chordata
- Class: Actinopterygii
- Division: Teleostei
- Order: Cypriniformes
- Suborder: Cyprinoidei
- Family: Acheilognathidae; Bleeker, 1863

Type species
- Capoeta rhombea Temminck & Schlegel, 1846

= Acheilognathidae =

Family of fishes

The bitterling-like cyprinids form the cyprinoid family Acheilognathidae. This family contains seven genera, although the Khanka spiny bitterling is often placed in Acheilognathus, and at least 75 described species to date. Over half of the species are in the genus Acheilognathus.

== Genera ==
Acheilognathidae contains the following genera:

- Acheilognathus Bleeker, 1859
- Paratanakia Chang, Chen & Mayden, 2014
- Pseudorhodeus Chang, Chen & Mayden, 2014
- Rhodeus Agassiz, 1832
- Sinorhodeus Li, Liao & Arai, 2017
- Tanakia D. S. Jordan & W. F. Thompson, 1914
