= List of animals of Japan =

== Animals in Japan ==
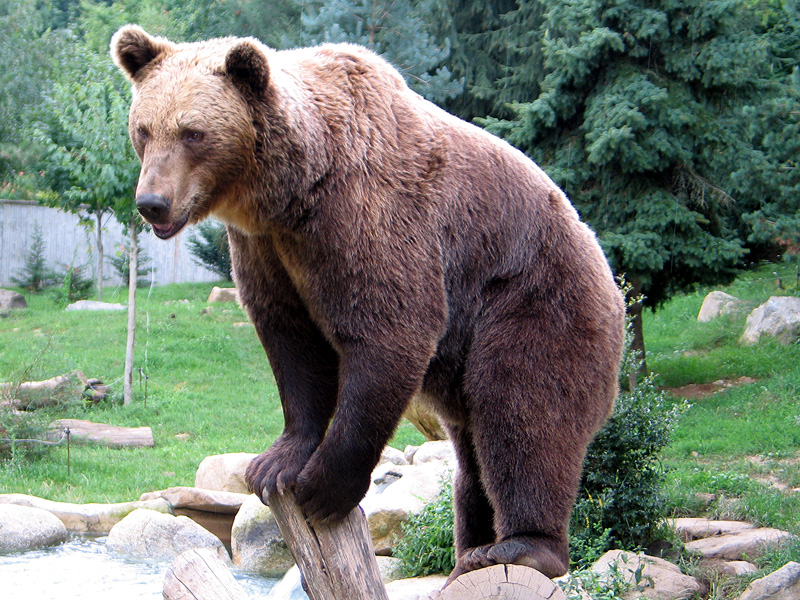
Ussuri brown bear

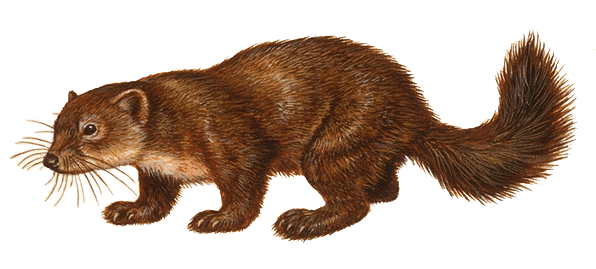
Sable

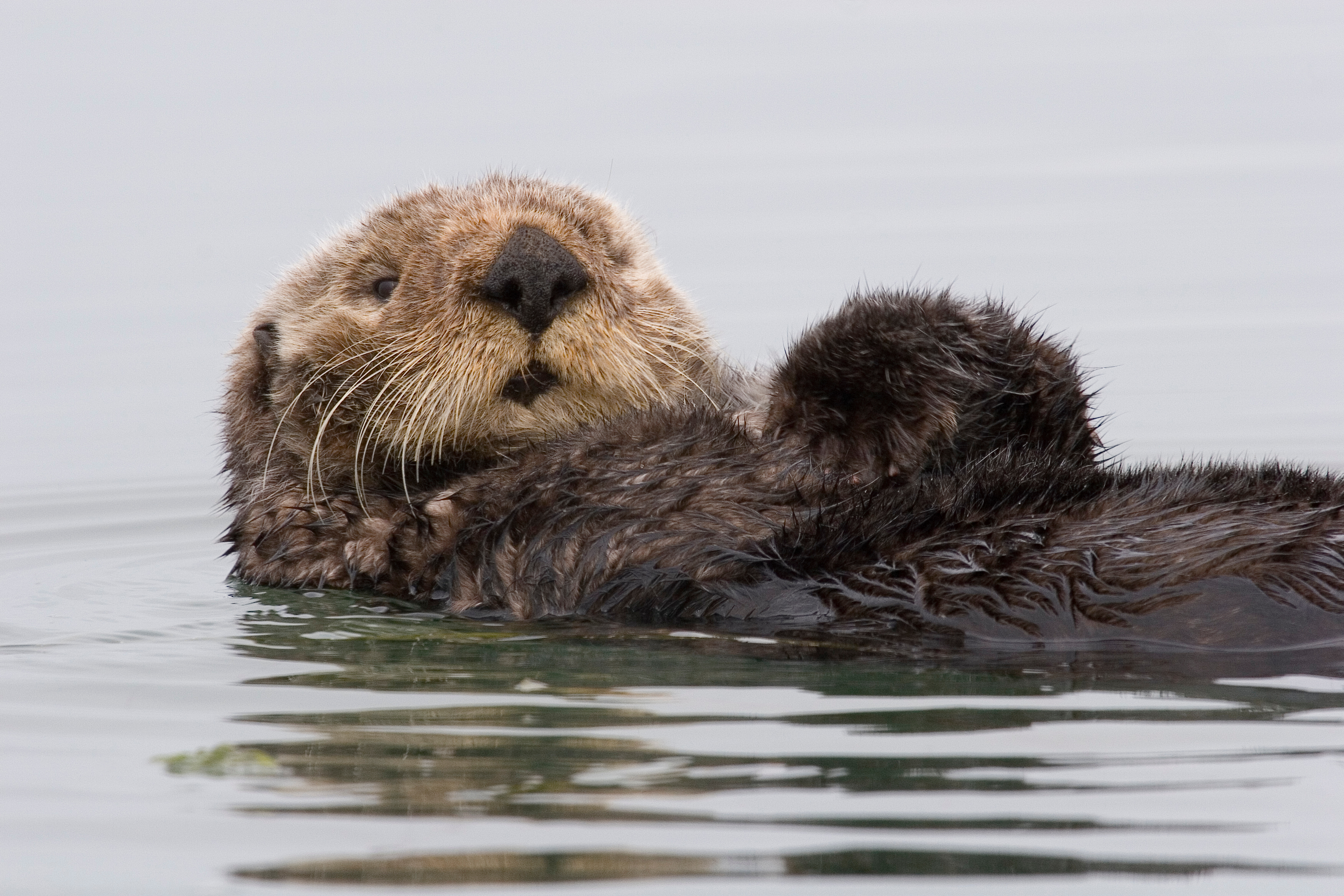
Sea otter

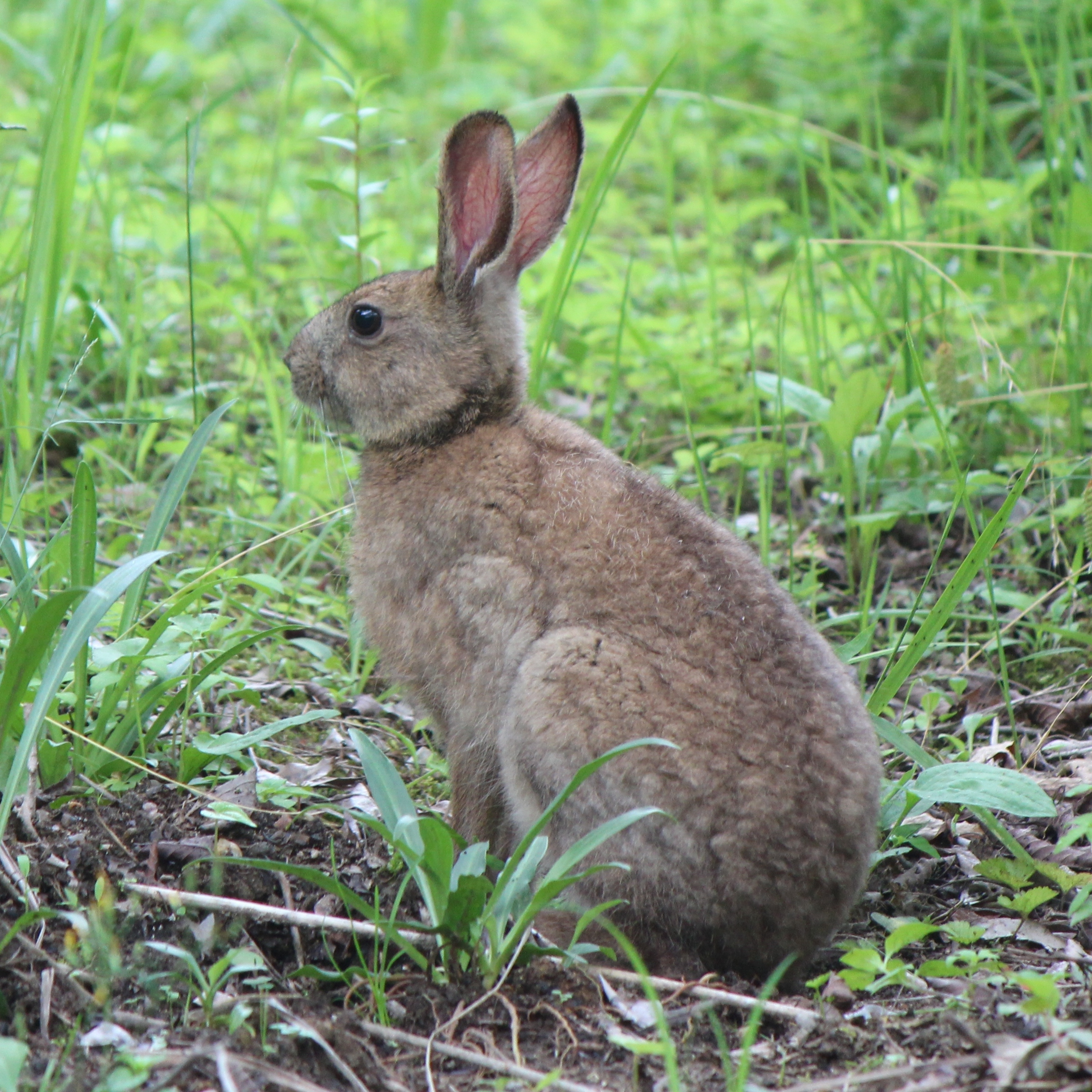
Japanese hare

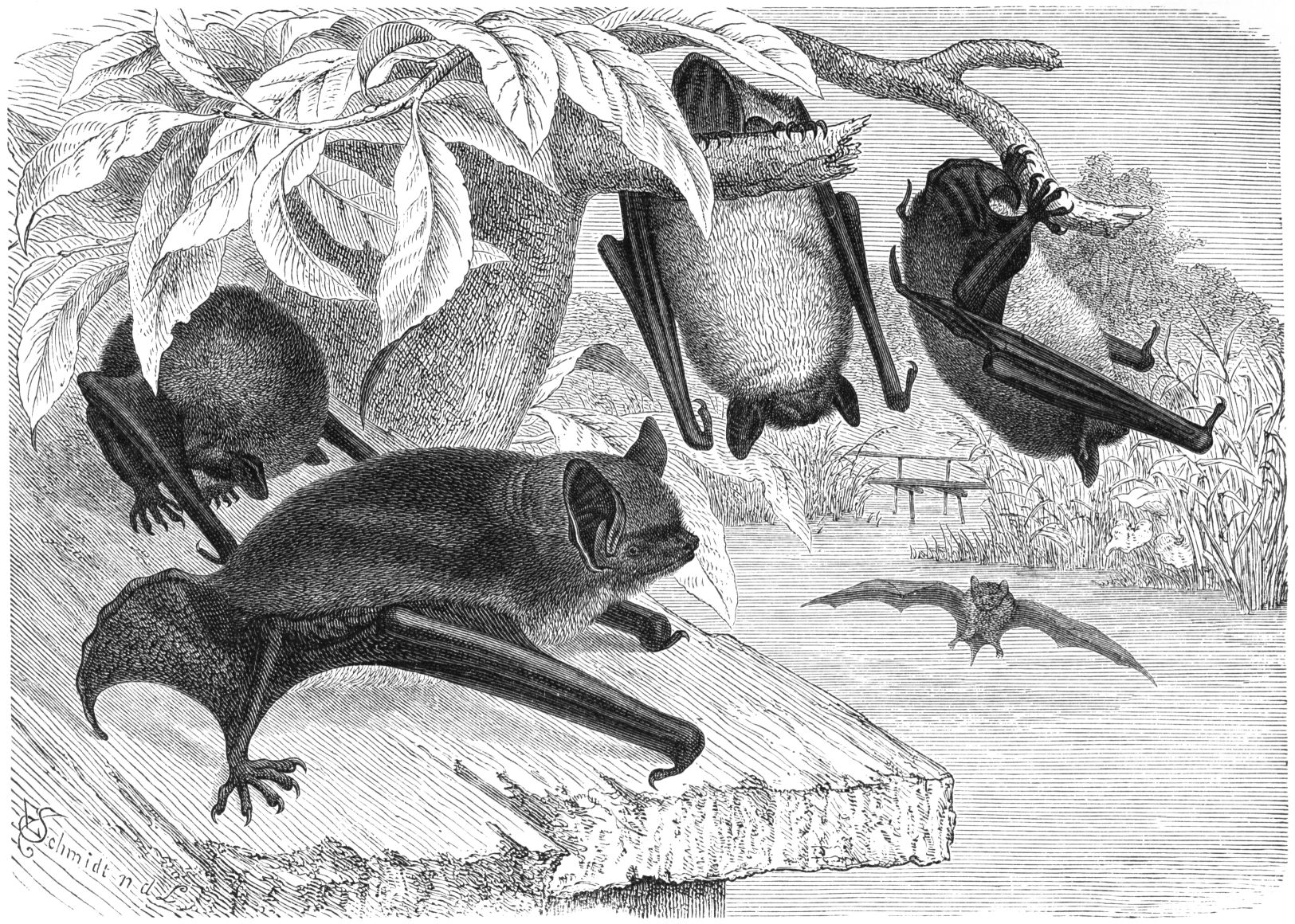
Daubenton's bat

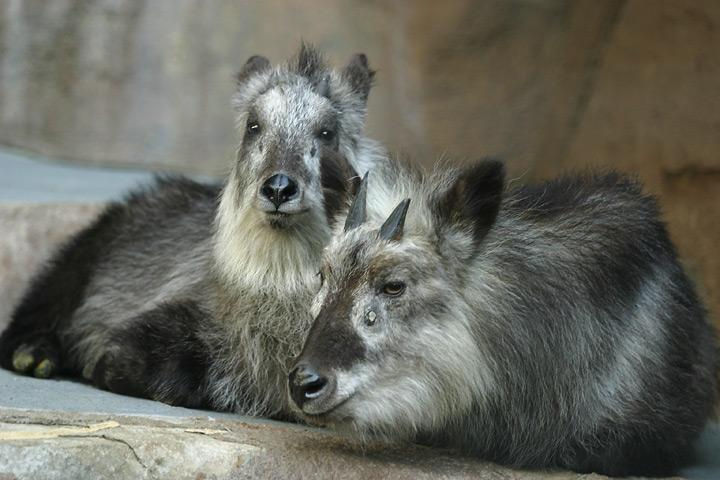
Japanese serow

=== Mammals ===
- Amami rabbit
- Asian particolored bat
- Akita inu
- Azumi shrew
- Birdlike noctule
- Bonin flying fox
- Echigo mole
- Endo's pipistrelle
- Ezo red fox
- Daubenton's bat
- Dsinezumi shrew
- Fraternal myotis
- Frosted myotis
- Greater horseshoe bat
- Hokkaido red-backed vole
- Hokkaidō wolf
- Honshū wolf
- Horsfield's shrew
- Ikonnikov's bat
- Imaizumi's horseshoe bat
- Iriomote cat
- Japanese badger
- Japanese boar
- Japanese Bobtail
- Japanese black bear
- Japanese dormouse
- Japanese dwarf flying squirrel
- Japanese giant flying squirrel
- Japanese grass vole
- Japanese hare
- Japanese house bat
- Japanese macaque
- Japanese marten
- Japanese mole
- Japanese mountain mole
- Japanese raccoon dog
- Japanese red-backed vole
- Japanese red fox
- Japanese sea lion
- Japanese serow
- Japanese shrew mole
- Japanese squirrel
- Japanese water shrew
- Japanese weasel
- Kerama deer
- Kobe mole
- La Touche's free-tailed bat
- Large Japanese field mouse
- Lesser great leaf-nosed bat
- Little Japanese horseshoe bat
- Muennink's spiny rat
- Northern pika
- Okinawa flying fox
- Ryukyu flying fox
- Ryukyu long-tailed giant rat
- Ryukyu mouse
- Ryukyu shrew
- Ryukyu spiny rat
- Ryukyu tube-nosed bat
- Sado mole
- Sado shrew
- Shiba Inu
- Shinano whiskered bat
- Shinto shrew
- Siberian chipmunk
- Sika deer
- Small Japanese field mouse
- Small Japanese mole
- Southeast Asian long-fingered bat
- Sturdee's pipistrelle
- Tanezumi rat
- Tokunoshima spiny rat
- True's shrew mole
- Tsushima leopard cat
- Ussuri brown bear
- Wild boar
- Yanbaru whiskered bat
- Yezo sika deer

=== Birds ===
- Japanese quail
- Green pheasant
- Japanese wagtail
- Japanese bantam
- Okinawa woodpecker
- Red-crowned crane
- Blakiston's fish owl

=== Marine animals ===
- Japanese sea lily
- Japanese spider crab
- Giant squid
- Nomura's jellyfish
- Firefly squid
- Tachypleus tridentatus

=== Fish ===
- Anago (conger eel)
- Ayu
- Biwia yodoensis
- Biwia zezera
- Fugu (pufferfish)
- Ginbuna
- Goblin shark
- Japanese amberjack
- Hypomesus japonicus
- Hypomesus nipponensis
- Japanese common catfish
- Japanese white crucian carp
- Katsuo (bonito)
- Koi
- Maguro (tuna)
- Nigorobuna
- Oily bitterling
- Saba (mackerel)
- Sake/shake (salmon)
- Sakhalin taimen (stringfish)
- Sanma (Pacific saury)
- Tanakia lanceolata
- Viper dogfish
- Japanese roughshark

=== Reptiles ===
- Habu, four different species of venomous snake that exist in certain islands including Okinawa, the Sakishima Islands and the Tokara Islands, but not on the islands of Honshu, Kyushu, Shikoku, Hokkaido.
- Mamushi, a species of venomous snake that exists in all areas of Japan except certain islands including Okinawa and Amami Ōshima.
- Gekko hokouensis
- Japanese pond turtle
- Schlegel's Japanese gecko
- Japanese keelback
- Achalinus spinalis
- Japanese striped snake
- Rhabdophis tigrinus
- Japanese rat snake
- Iwasaki's snail-eater

=== Amphibians ===
- Japanese giant salamander (Andrias japonicus)
- Montane brown frog (Rana ornativentris)
- Japanese fire belly newt (Cynops pyrrhogaster)
- Japanese tree frog (Dryophytes japonicus)
- Japanese brown frog (Rana japonica)
- Daruma pond frog (Pelophylax porosus)
- Japanese common toad (Bufo japonicus)
- Japanese stream toad (Bufo torrenticola)

=== Insects and arachnids ===
- Luciola cruciata
- Sasakia charonda
- Papilio maackii
- Tanna japonensis
- Nephila clavata
- Asian giant hornet (Vespa mandarinia)
- Hyalessa maculaticollis
- Carabus insulicola
- Aquatica lateralis
- Carabus blaptoides
- Chrysochroa fulgidissima
- Brown marmorated stink bug (Halyomorpha halys)

=== Molluscs ===
- Japonia striatula
- Haliotis exigua
- Trochochlamys ogasawarana
- Haliotis madaka
- Haliotis discus

== See also ==
- Wildlife of Japan
- List of mammals of Japan
