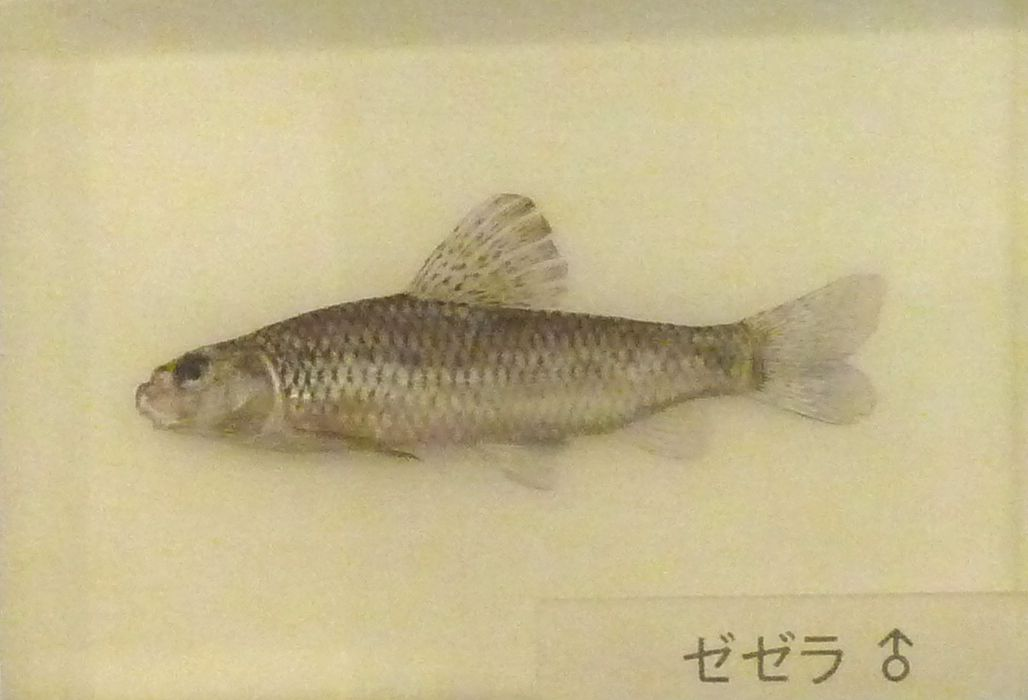
- Biwia zezera

Scientific classification
- Kingdom: Animalia
- Phylum: Chordata
- Class: Actinopterygii
- Order: Cypriniformes
- Family: Gobionidae
- Genus: Biwia; D. S. Jordan & Fowler, 1903

Type species
- Pseudogobio zezera Ishikawa, 1895

= Biwia =

Genus of fishes

Biwia is a genus of freshwater ray-finned fish belonging to the family Gobionidae, the gudgeons. The fishes in this genus are found in Korea and Japan.

== Species ==
- Biwia springeri (Bănărescu & Nalbant, 1973)
- Biwia tama (Ōshima, 1957)
- Biwia yodoensis Kawase & K. Hosoye, 2010
- Biwia zezera (Ishikawa, 1895)
