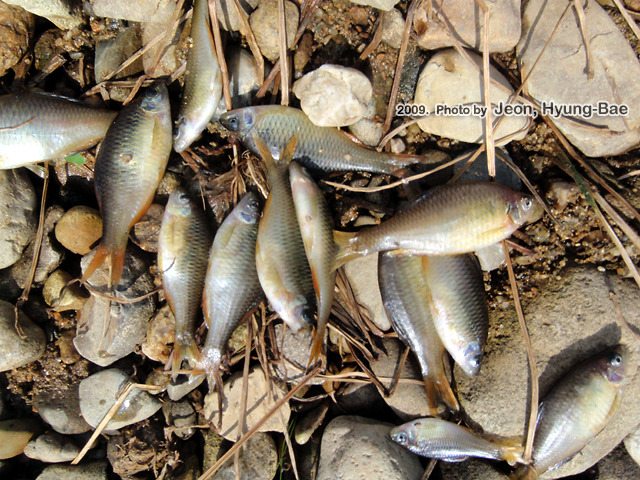
- Dead Acheilognathus somjinensis & Acheilognathus koreensis because of fish trap angler.

Conservation status
- Least Concern (IUCN 3.1)

Scientific classification
- Kingdom: Animalia
- Phylum: Chordata
- Class: Actinopterygii
- Order: Cypriniformes
- Suborder: Cyprinoidei
- Family: Acheilognathidae
- Genus: Tanakia
- Species: T. koreensis

Binomial name
- Tanakia koreensis (I. S. Kim & C. H. Kim), 1990

Synonyms
- Acheilognathus koreensis (I. S. Kim & C. H. Kim, 1990)

= Tanakia koreensis =

Species of fish

Tanakia koreensis is a species of freshwater ray-finned fish belonging to the family Acheilognathidae, the bitterlings. This species is found in Korea which can grow to a size of 8 centimeters.
