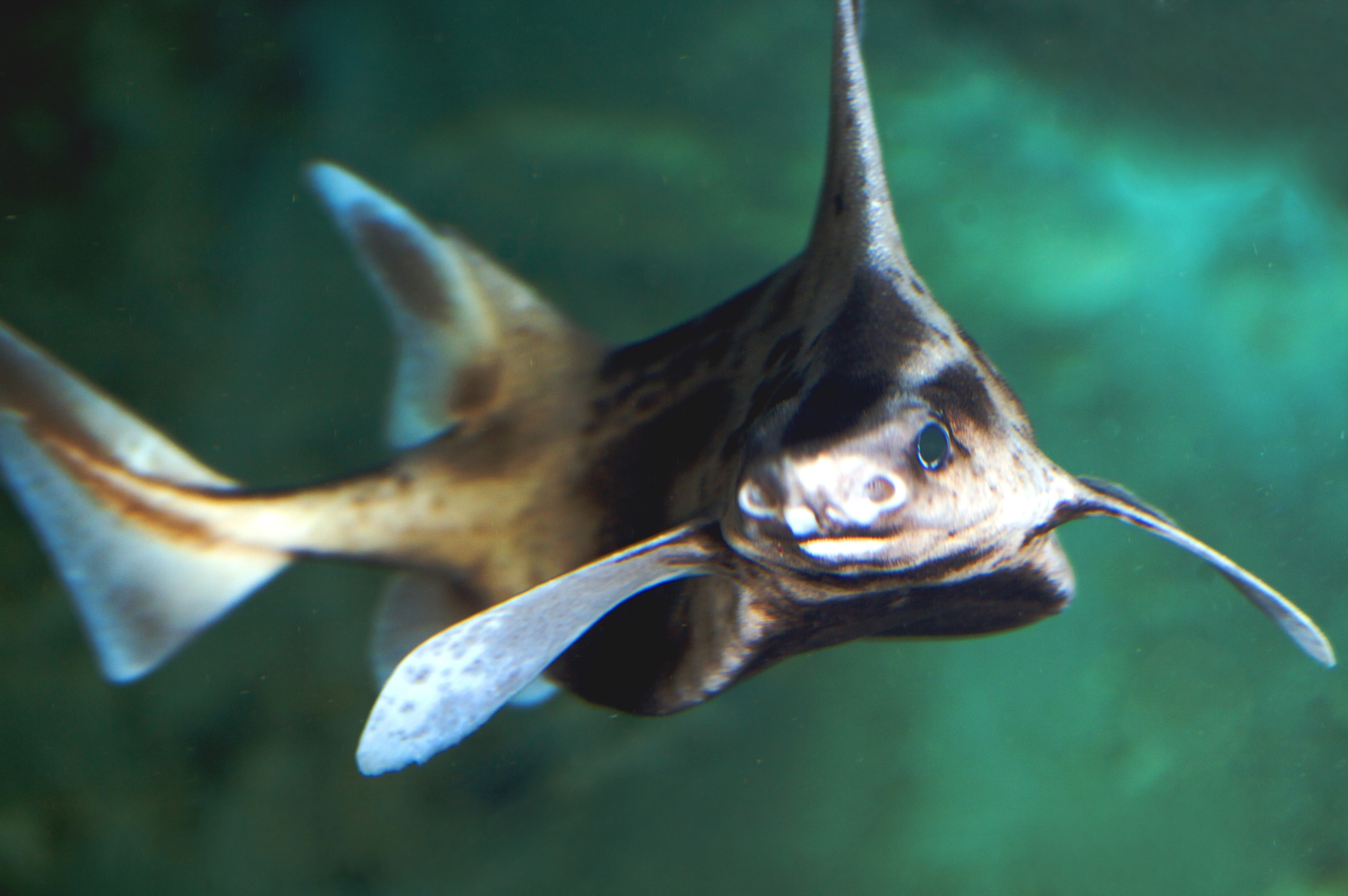
- Caribbean roughshark, Oxynotus caribbaeus

Scientific classification
- Kingdom: Animalia
- Phylum: Chordata
- Class: Chondrichthyes
- Subclass: Elasmobranchii
- Division: Selachii
- Order: Squaliformes
- Family: Oxynotidae; T. N. Gill, 1912
- Genus: Oxynotus; Rafinesque, 1810

Type species
- Oxynotus centrina Rafinesque, 1810

= Oxynotus =

Oxynotus Temporal range: 23–0 Ma Lower Miocene to present

Genus of sharks

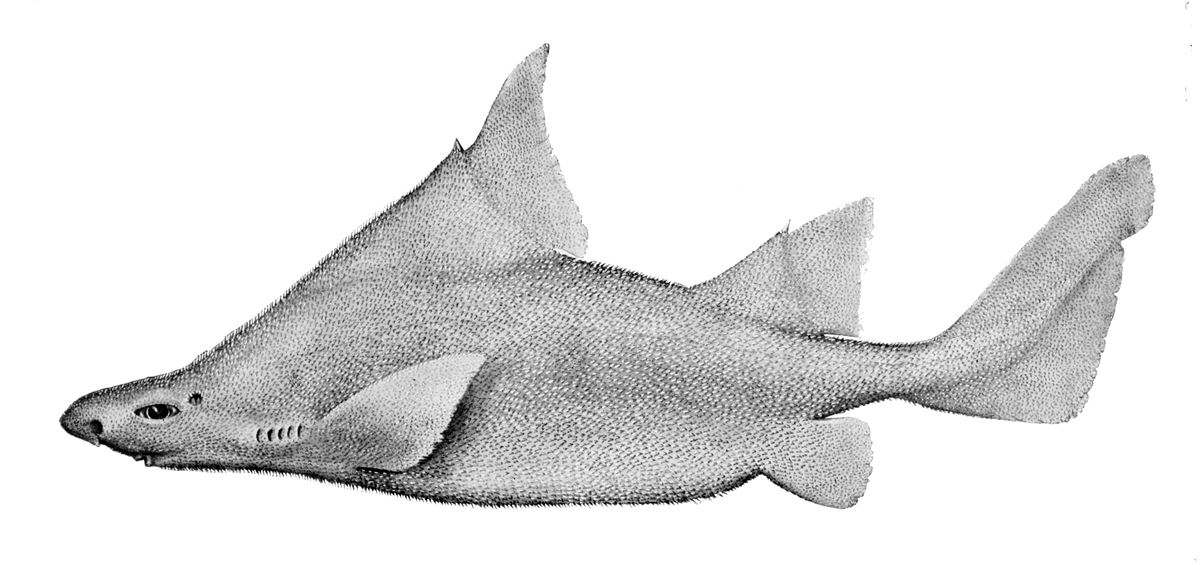
Prickly dogfish, Oxynotus bruniensis

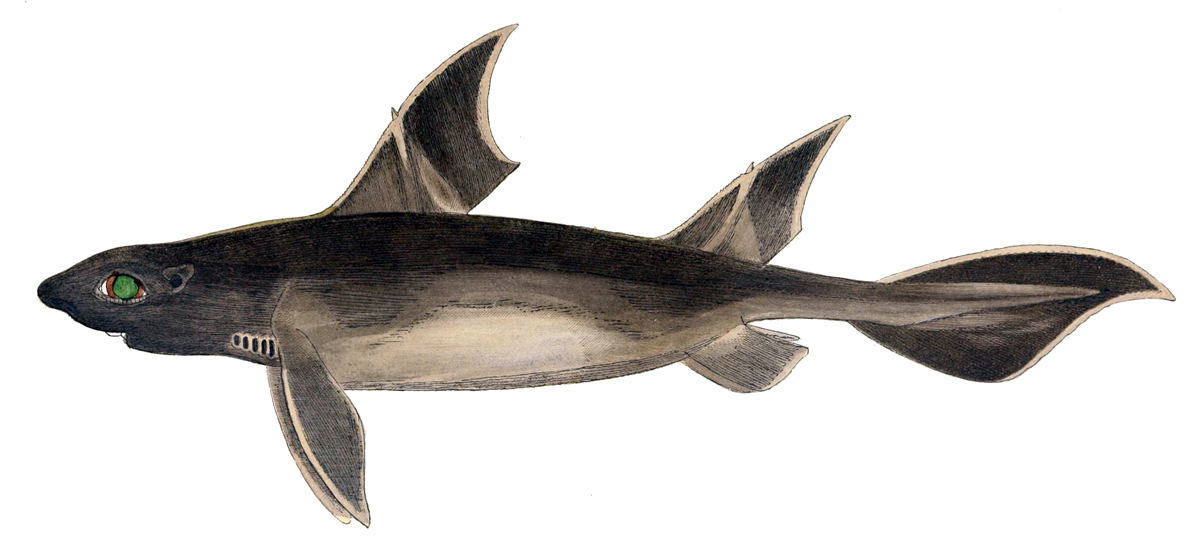
Angular roughshark, Oxynotus centrina

Oxynotus is a genus of sharks in the order Squaliformes, commonly known as the rough sharks. It is the only extant genus in the family Oxynotidae. They live in deep waters in the Atlantic and western Pacific Oceans.

Rough sharks are small to medium in size, ranging from 49 to 150 cm (1.61 to 4.92 ft) in adult body length, depending on species. Their bodies are compressed, giving them a triangular cross-section. They have two large dorsal fins, each with a sharp spine, and with the first fin placed far forward above the head. Even more so than their relatives, the dogfishes, they have rough and prickly skin. Unusually among sharks, they also possess a luminous organ.

== Species ==
- Oxynotus bruniensis Ogilby, 1893 (prickly dogfish)
- Oxynotus caribbaeus Cervigón, 1961 (Caribbean roughshark)
- †Oxynotus crochardi Welton, 1983
- Oxynotus centrina Linnaeus, 1758 (angular roughshark)
- Oxynotus japonicus Ka. Yano & Murofushi, 1985 (Japanese roughshark)
- Oxynotus paradoxus Frade, 1929 (sailfin roughshark)

== See also ==
- List of prehistoric cartilaginous fish
