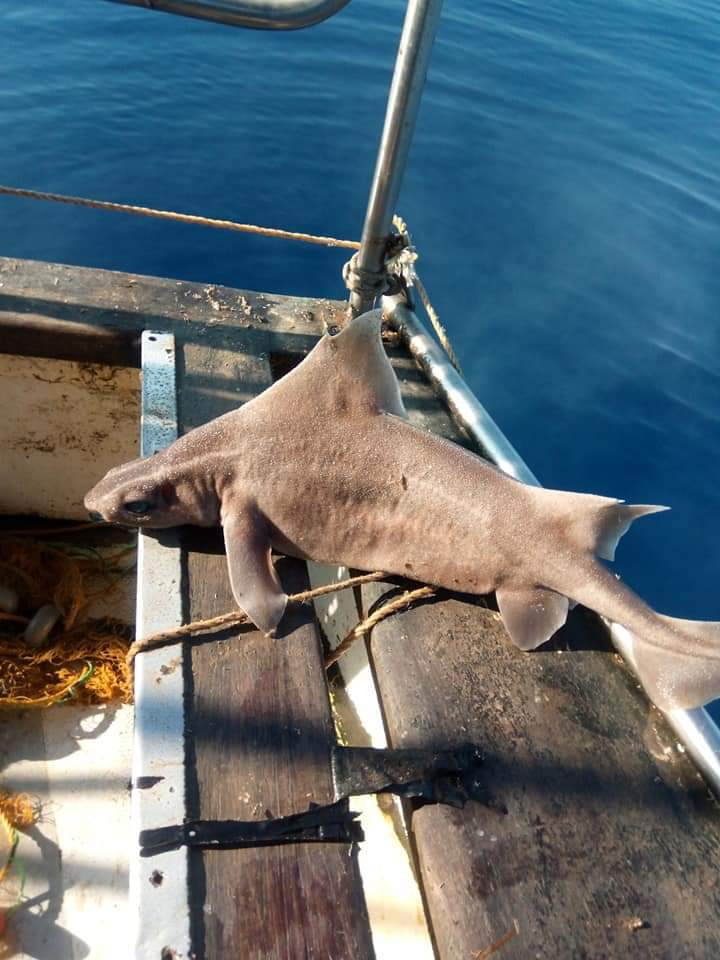

Conservation status
- Endangered (IUCN 3.1)

Scientific classification
- Kingdom: Animalia
- Phylum: Chordata
- Class: Chondrichthyes
- Subclass: Elasmobranchii
- Division: Selachii
- Order: Squaliformes
- Family: Oxynotidae
- Genus: Oxynotus
- Species: O. centrina

Binomial name
- Oxynotus centrina (Linnaeus, 1758)
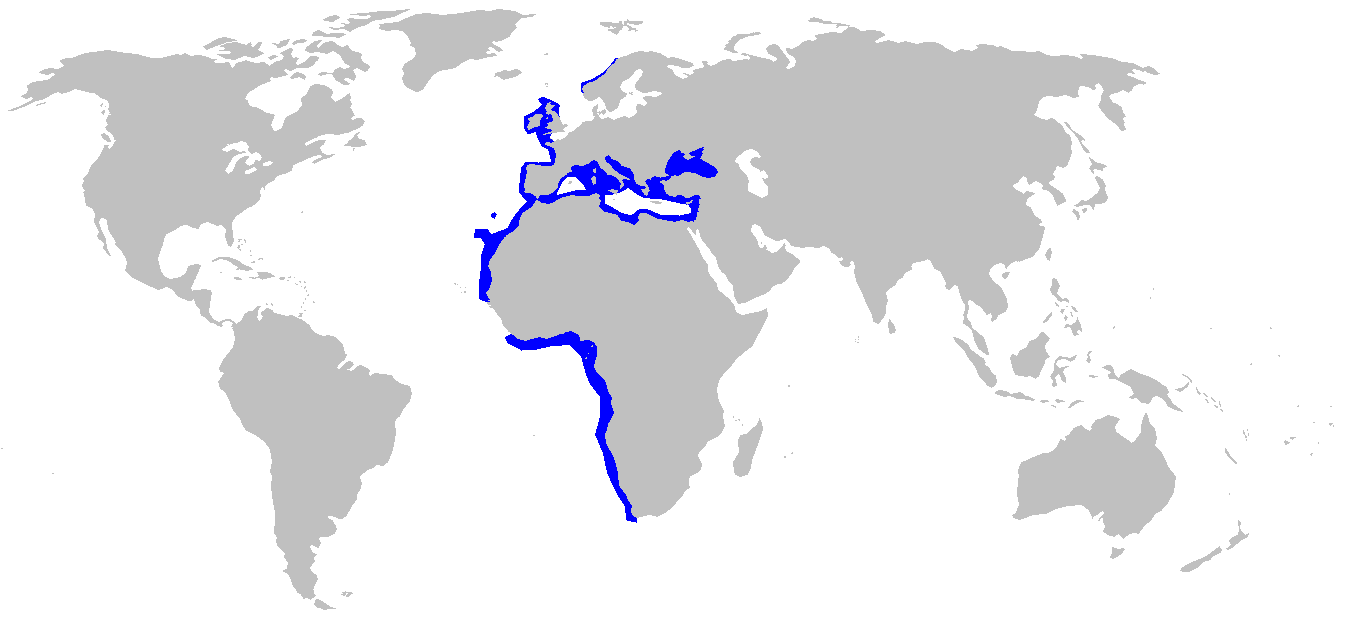
- Range of the angular roughshark (in blue)

= Angular roughshark =

Species of shark

The angular roughshark (Oxynotus centrina) is a rough shark of the family Oxynotidae.

== Taxonomy ==
Biologist Carl Linnaeus described the angular roughshark, O. centrina, in 1758. This name was finalized and accepted by the scientific community as the official name for the species in 1976.

== Description ==
At birth, they are less than 25 cm (9.8 in) and they mature at about 50 cm (20 in). Most records are of individuals less than 1 m (3.3 ft), but they can reach about 1.5 m (4.9 ft). Individuals from the Mediterranean Sea usually measure less than 80 cm (2.6 ft). Their litter size is seven or eight pups off Angola to 23 in the Mediterranean. They have ridges over their eyes that expand into large, rounded knobs, which are covered with enlarged denticles – these are absent in other species of rough sharks. They possess very large spiracles that are vertically elongated, being almost as high as the length of their eyes. Their first dorsal spine is oriented slightly forward. They feed on worms, crustaceans, and mollusks.

Oxynotus centrina has a compressed body, triangular in cross section, with a broad and flattened head. The snout is flat and blunt. Just like all of the Oxynotus species, they have two relatively large dorsal fins that are sail-like, and no anal fin. It has very rough skin and is typically a uniform black to dark grey-brown. Adults generally display darker coloration, often featuring darker blotches on the head and sides, though these blotches can sometimes be indistinct. One identifying feature is the light horizontal line below the eyes on the cheek.

Since it shares the northeast Atlantic with another species of Oxynotus, other distinguishing features include the extremely large spiracles, their dorsal fins, and their large dermal denticles above their eyes. Like most of the Oxynotus species, O. centrina has lanceolate upper teeth and blade-like lower teeth, with 12 rows of teeth on either side.

Oxynotus centrina usually moves by gliding on the bottom of the sea, sometimes hovering over the sandy or muddy surfaces of the seabed.

In 2024, an adult individual with abnormal coloration was captured near Sazan Island in Albania. The shark exhibited partial pigmentation reduction, resulting in a pale appearance with white-greyish patches. Classified as leucistic, this case represents the first documented instance of leucism in the species and the first color disorder reported in the family Oxynotidae. Despite its atypical appearance, the shark's physical health appeared unaffected.

== Range and habitat ==
Oxynotus centrina is a bathydemersal shark typically found on the outer continental shelves and upper slopes of the eastern Atlantic, ranging from Norway to South Africa and throughout the entire Mediterranean, with additional occurrences reported off the coast of Mozambique. It prefers coralline algal and muddy bottoms at depths of 50 to 660 m (160 to 2,170 ft), primarily inhabiting areas below 100 m (330 ft), though they have been recorded at depths of up to 1,300 m (4,300 ft). Studies of these sharks in the Mediterranean indicate they prefer to occupy depths of 60 to 600 m (200 to 1,970 ft).

== Reproduction ==
Male and female angular roughsharks are reported to mature at about 50–70 cm (20–28 in). Although, some studies have shown that females mature at a slightly larger size than males. Being an ovoviviparous species, O. centrina produces 10–12 pups usually between 21 and 24 cm (8.3 and 9.4 in) in length.

== Population ==
Some data has been gathered on this species of Oxynotus in the period from 1994 to 1999 in the Mediterranean, where it is mostly rare. O. centrina was only present in 0.6% of the tows during this period at a depth of 100 to 200 m. Regional indexes indicate this species is more common in the western central Mediterranean and lower index in the western and eastern Mediterranean. However, O. centrina was completely absent from the Eastern central Mediterranean.

In 1948, trawl surveys indicated that O. centrina was once present, but uncommon, in the Adriatic. The species has been absent in subsequent studies in the Adriatic, suggesting a possible extinction of that species in the area. However, recent studies, conducted by Lipej in 2004, show that some juveniles have been caught in the central Adriatic. Data collected during surveys in the Balearic Sea and the Ionian Sea identified one specimen at a depth of 800 m in the western Ionian Sea, suggesting that the population of O. centrina in the east-central Mediterranean is unknown.

However, this species was absent in the northeast Atlantic in a study of deepwater longline fishing for sharks near the Canary Islands. This is important because this species was abundant in this region until 1997.

In 2026, a deceased angular roughshark (Oxynotus centrina) was recorded at Eastern Beach, Gibraltar, representing a rare coastal sighting in Gibraltar waters.

== Conservation status ==
Oxynotus centrina is a minor bycatch of offshore fisheries such as trawl fleets. Although this can have a negative impact on the species, as stated above, the species had been thought extinct in the Adriatic, decreased fishing has led to their rediscovery.

This species, sometimes caught by fishermen in the Mediterranean, has little to no commercial value. Also, it is thought to bring bad luck to fishermen if caught and kept. When released, it has never been reported to survive.

The IUCN Red List of Threatened Species has deemed this species of Oxynotus as endangered due to consistent landings by fishermen and bycatch by deepsea fisheries.
