= Carabus blaptoides oxuroides =

Scientific classification
- Domain: Eukaryota
- Kingdom: Animalia
- Phylum: Arthropoda
- Class: Insecta
- Order: Coleoptera
- Suborder: Adephaga
- Family: Carabidae
- Genus: Carabus
- Species: C. blaptoides
- Subspecies: C. b. oxuroides

Trinomial name
- Carabus blaptoides oxuroides Schaum, 1862

Synonyms
- Carabus pandurus Bates, 1873; Carabus cyanostola Lewis, 1882; Carabus swinhoei Oberthür, 1883, nec Bates, 1870; Carabus angulatus Hauser, 1921, nec Fabricius, 1781; Carabus multiseriatus Hauser, 1921, nec Hauser, 1921; Carabus subreticulatus Hauser, 1921; Carabus viridipennis Hauser, 1921, nec Lewis, 1880; Carabus matsumurai Csiki, 1927; Carabus multiordinatus Csiki, 1927; Carabus shiranensis Kanda, 1928; Carabus paraoxuroides Baba, 1938; Carabus pseudofortunei Baba, 1938

Subspecies of beetle

Carabus blaptoides oxuroides is a subspecies of ground beetle in the family Carabidae that is endemic to Japan. The species are gray coloured with purple pronotum.
