= Tanakia latimarginata =

Conservation status
- Data Deficient (IUCN 3.1)

Scientific classification
- Kingdom: Animalia
- Phylum: Chordata
- Class: Actinopterygii
- Order: Cypriniformes
- Suborder: Cyprinoidei
- Family: Acheilognathidae
- Genus: Tanakia
- Species: T. latimarginata

Binomial name
- Tanakia latimarginata Kim, Jeon & Suk, 2014

Species of fish

Tanakia latimarginata is a species of freshwater ray-finned fish belonging to the family Acheilognathidae, the bitterlings. It is endemic to South Korea, where it is found in the Nakdong River drainage.
