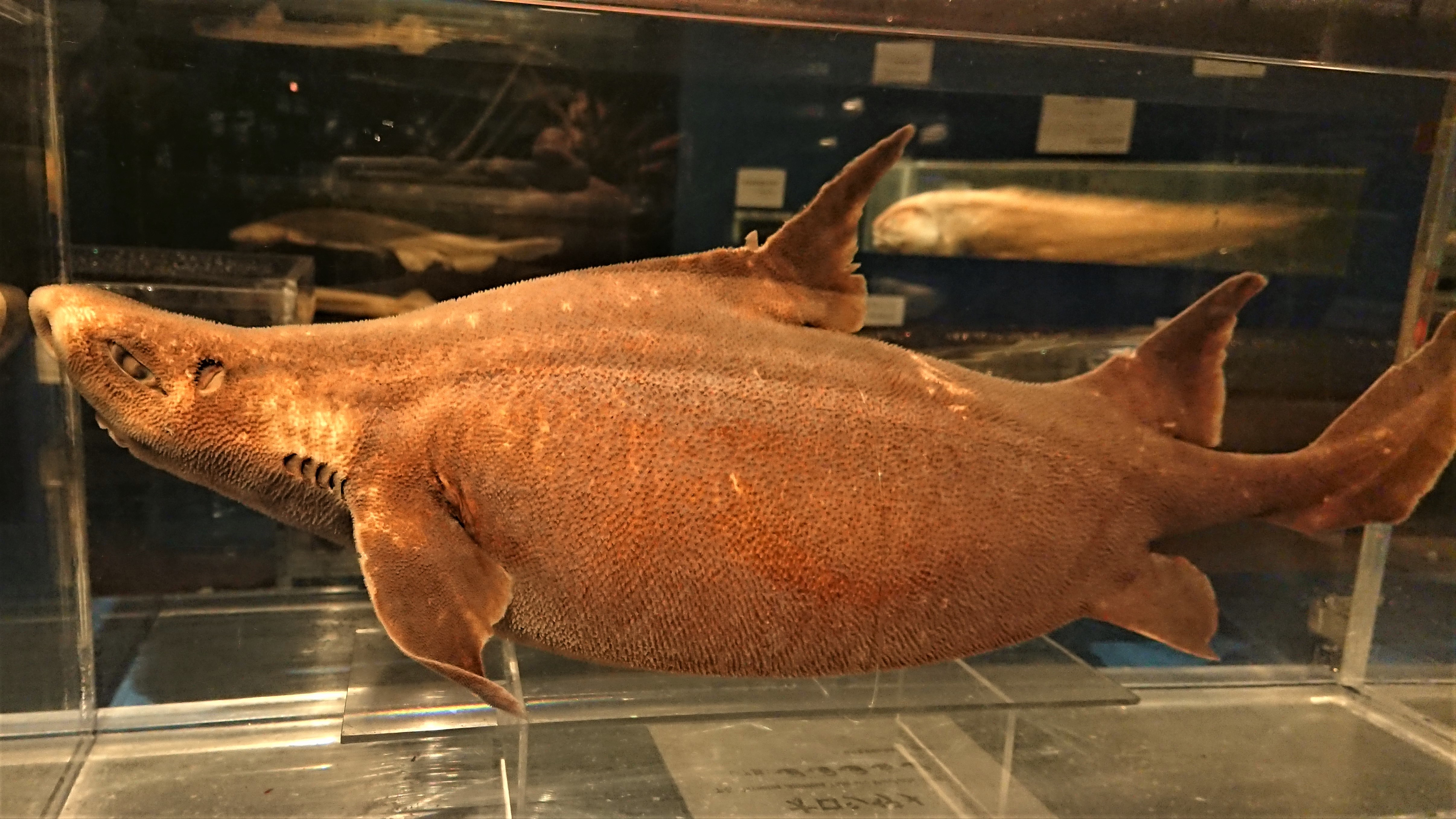

Conservation status
- Vulnerable (IUCN 3.1)

Scientific classification
- Kingdom: Animalia
- Phylum: Chordata
- Class: Chondrichthyes
- Subclass: Elasmobranchii
- Division: Selachii
- Order: Squaliformes
- Family: Oxynotidae
- Genus: Oxynotus
- Species: O. japonicus

Binomial name
- Oxynotus japonicus Ka. Yano & Murofushi, 1985
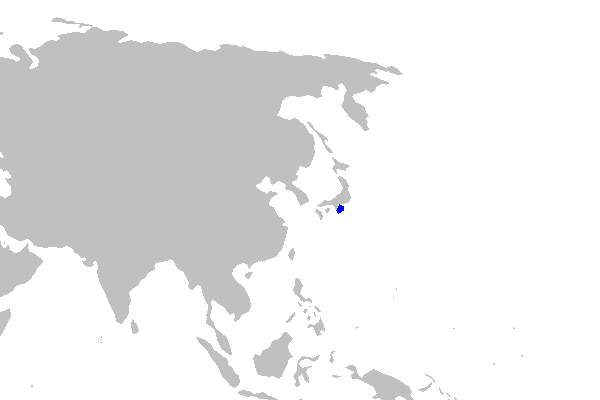
- Range of the Japanese roughshark

= Japanese roughshark =

Species of shark

The Japanese roughshark (Oxynotus japonicus) is a rare species of shark in the family Oxynotidae, known only from a handful of specimens recovered from Suruga Bay and the Enshunada Sea off Japan. It is a benthic species that occurs at a depth of 150–350 m (490–1,150 ft). This shark is caught (and discarded) as bycatch by bottom trawlers throughout its entire limited range, and may be threatened given the declines in other bottom deep sea species in Suruga Bay.

This species grows to 64.5 cm (25.4 in) long. It is similar to other rough sharks in having a stout, high trunk, a dorsally depressed head, and two sail-like dorsal fins with deeply embedded spines. The snout is short, with large nostrils whose lateral and medial apertures are separated by a thick nasal flap. The eyes and spiracles are oval in shape. The five pairs of gill slits are very small and vertical. The mouth is small, with thick, fleshy lips; the teeth in the upper jaw are narrow, erect, and smooth-edged, while those in the lower jaw are broad, blade-like, and smooth-edged. Only one row of teeth in the lower jaw are functional.

The large dorsal fins are subtriangular in shape, with the first dorsal spine sloping slightly backward. The pectoral fins have a convex front margin and a concave rear margin. The anal fin is absent. There is a strong ridge running between the pectoral and pelvic fins on each side of the body. The dermal denticles are large and widely spaced, giving the skin a very rough texture. This species differs from the similar sailfin roughshark in the positioning of the dorsal fins and the shape of the spiracle. The color is a uniform dark brown, with the lips, nasal flap margins, fin axils and inner margins of claspers white.

Reproduction is ovoviviparous, as in other dogfish sharks. Size at maturity is 59 cm (23 in) long for females and 54 cm (21 in) long for males.
