= Carabus blaptoides rugipennis =

Scientific classification
- Kingdom: Animalia
- Phylum: Arthropoda
- Clade: Pancrustacea
- Class: Insecta
- Order: Coleoptera
- Suborder: Adephaga
- Family: Carabidae
- Genus: Carabus
- Species: C. blaptoides
- Subspecies: C. b. rugipennis

Trinomial name
- Carabus blaptoides rugipennis Motschulsky, 1861

Synonyms
- Carabus auricollis Waterhouse, 1867; Carabus anurus Semenov, 1898

Subspecies of beetle

Carabus blaptoides rugipennis is a subspecies of ground beetle in the family Carabidae that can be found in Japan and Russia. The species are gray coloured with green pronotum.
