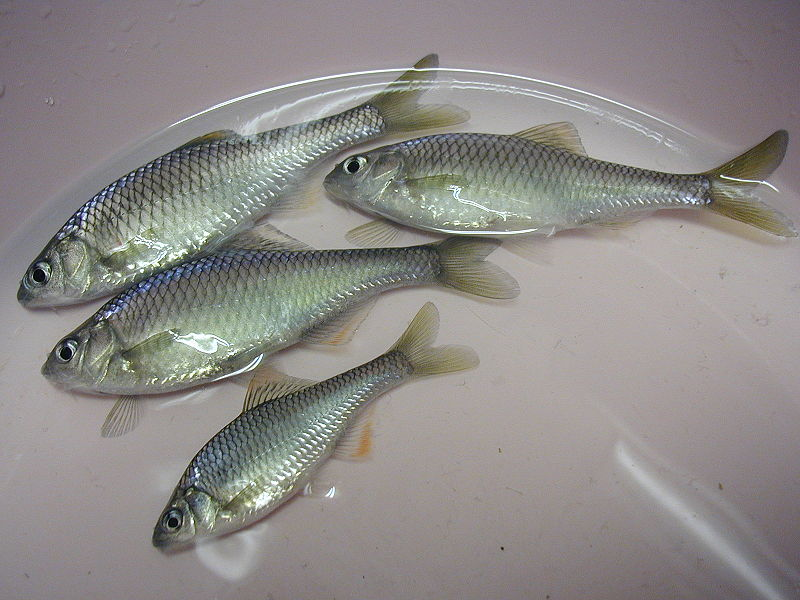
- Tanakia lanceolata

Scientific classification
- Domain: Eukaryota
- Kingdom: Animalia
- Phylum: Chordata
- Class: Actinopterygii
- Order: Cypriniformes
- Family: Acheilognathidae
- Genus: Tanakia; D. S. Jordan & W. F. Thompson, 1914

Type species
- Rhodeus oryzae D. S. Jordan & Seale, 1906

= Tanakia =

Genus of fishes

Tanakia is a genus of cyprinid fish, consisting of seven species that occur in Eastern Asia. The type species is the Tanakia limbata.

Genus is named for Shigeho Tanaka (1878-1974), "accomplished" ichthyologist of the Imperial University of Tokyo, who described Tanakia shimazui in 1908 and Pseudorhodeus tanago in 1909.

== Species ==
These are the currently recognised species in this genus:

- Tanakia koreensis (I. S. Kim & C. H. Kim, 1990)
- Tanakia lanceolata (Temminck & Schlegel, 1846)
- Tanakia latimarginata (Kim, Jeon & Suk, 2014)
- Tanakia limbata (Temminck & Schlegel, 1846) (Oily bitterling)
- Tanakia shimazui (Tanaka, 1908)
- Tanakia signifer (Berg, 1907) (Korean bitterling)
- Tanakia somjinensis (Kim & Kim, 1991)
