= Tanakia shimazui =

Scientific classification
- Kingdom: Animalia
- Phylum: Chordata
- Class: Actinopterygii
- Order: Cypriniformes
- Suborder: Cyprinoidei
- Family: Acheilognathidae
- Genus: Tanakia
- Species: T. shimazui

Binomial name
- Tanakia shimazui S. Tanaka, 1908

Species of fish

Tanakia shimazui is a species of freshwater ray-finned fish belonging to the family Acheilognathidae, the bitterlings. It is endemic to Japan.

== Etymology ==
Named in honor of "Mr. Shimazu" (no forename given), a naturalist in Tokyo, who collected type.
