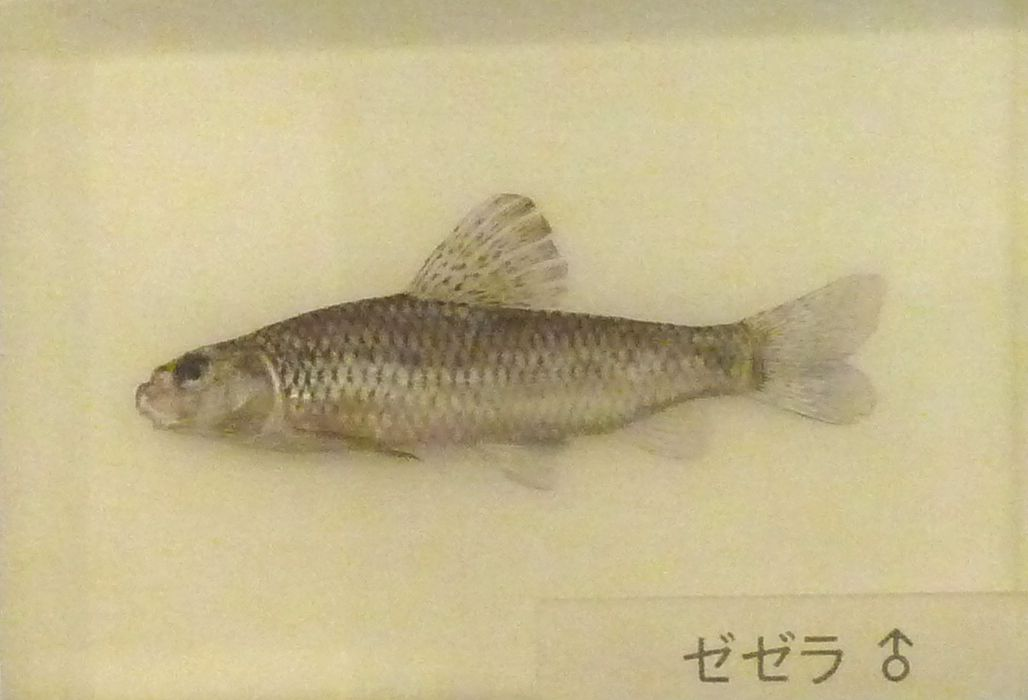

Conservation status
- Least Concern (IUCN 3.1)

Scientific classification
- Kingdom: Animalia
- Phylum: Chordata
- Class: Actinopterygii
- Order: Cypriniformes
- Suborder: Cyprinoidei
- Family: Gobionidae
- Genus: Biwia
- Species: B. zezera

Binomial name
- Biwia zezera (Ishikawa, 1895)

Synonyms
- Pseudogobio zezera Ishikawa, 1895

= Biwia zezera =

Species of fish

Biwia zezera, the Biwa gudgeon, is a species of freshwater ray-finned fish belonging to the family Gobionidae, the gudgeons. This species is found in Japan.
