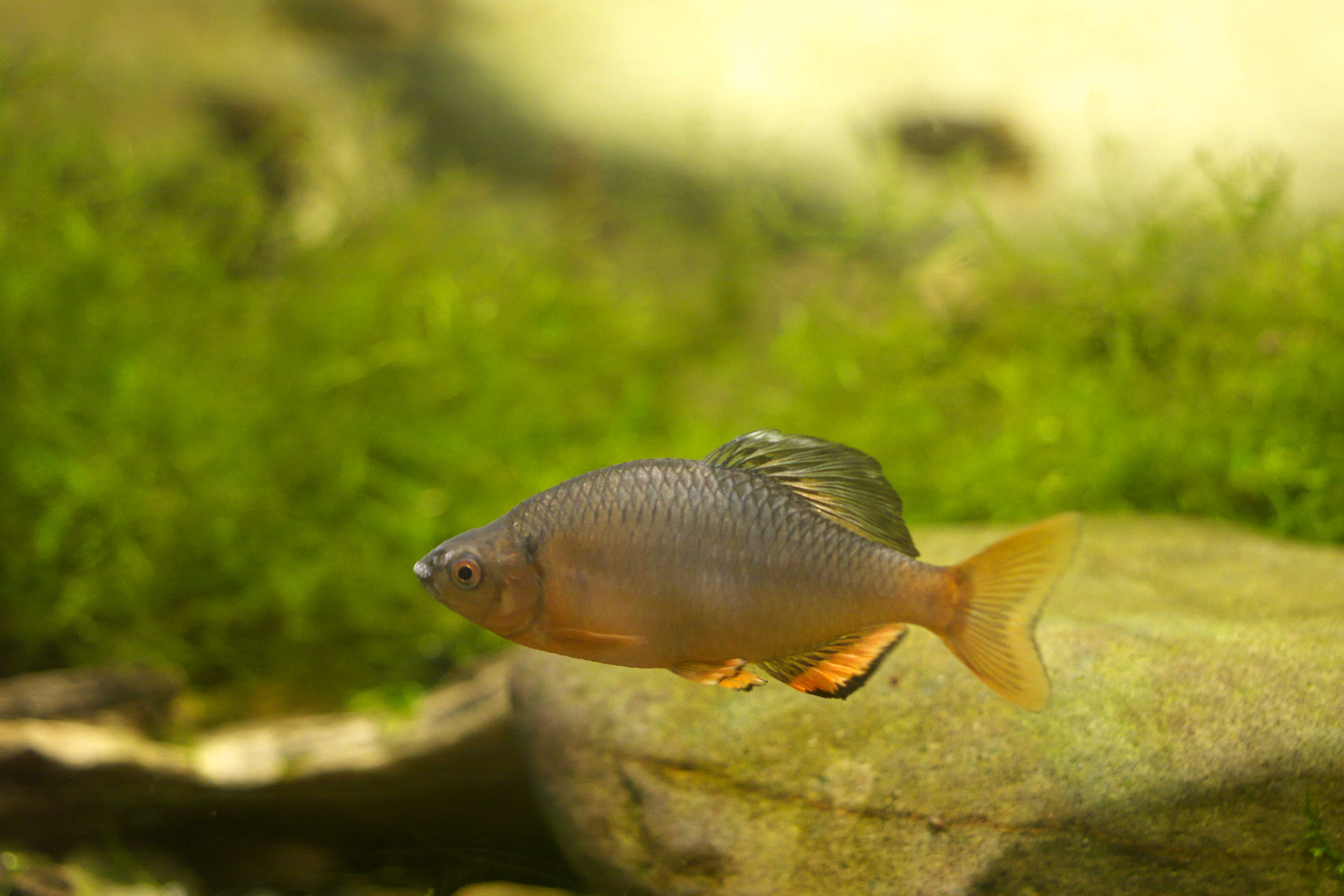

Conservation status
- Endangered (IUCN 3.1)

Scientific classification
- Kingdom: Animalia
- Phylum: Chordata
- Class: Actinopterygii
- Order: Cypriniformes
- Suborder: Cyprinoidei
- Family: Acheilognathidae
- Genus: Pseudorhodeus; Chang, Chen & Mayden, 2014
- Species: P. tanago

Binomial name
- Pseudorhodeus tanago S. Tanaka, 1909

Synonyms
- Rhodeus tanago Tanaka, 1909; Tanakia tanago Tanaka, 1909

= Tokyo bitterling =

Species of fish

The Tokyo bitterling (Pseudorhodeus tanago) is a temperate freshwater ray-finned fish belonging to the family Acheilognathidae. This fish is endemic to the island of Honshu in Japan.

The species was first described as Rhodeus tanago by Shigeho Tanaka in 1909. It is widely known as Tanakia tanago, although a 2014 study suggests it is genetically distinct from other Tanakia species, and warrants placement of it in the monotypic genus Pseudorhodeus.

== Distribution ==
In the wild, this fish is found only on the Kantō Plain of Japan, an area near the capital city, Tokyo. The fish was formerly abundant in small streams, but its habitat has been overrun by people and pollution.

== Threats ==
There is a real risk that it could become extinct in the wild. It also suffers from competition from the related but more aggressive rosy bitterling. Bitterlings lay their eggs in freshwater mussel shells. The Tokyo bitterling lays its eggs in only one type of mussel shell, limiting its chances of successful breeding. To help protect the fish, it has been declared a "national monument" by the Japanese government, and this gives it special protection.
