= Biwia tama =

Scientific classification
- Kingdom: Animalia
- Phylum: Chordata
- Class: Actinopterygii
- Order: Cypriniformes
- Suborder: Cyprinoidei
- Family: Gobionidae
- Genus: Biwia
- Species: B. tama

Binomial name
- Biwia tama (Ōshima, 1957)

Synonyms
- Abbottina tama Ōshima, 1957

Species of fish

Biwia tama is a species of freshwater ray-finned fish belonging to the family Gobionidae, the gudgeons. This fish is found in Japan.
