= Tanakia signifer =

Scientific classification
- Kingdom: Animalia
- Phylum: Chordata
- Class: Actinopterygii
- Order: Cypriniformes
- Suborder: Cyprinoidei
- Family: Acheilognathidae
- Genus: Tanakia
- Species: T. signifer

Binomial name
- Tanakia signifer L. S. Berg, 1907

Synonyms
- Acheilognathus signifer L. S. Berg, 1907

Species of fish

Tanakia signifer, the Korean bitterling, is a species of freshwater ray-finned fish belonging to the family Acheilognathidae, the bitterlings.
