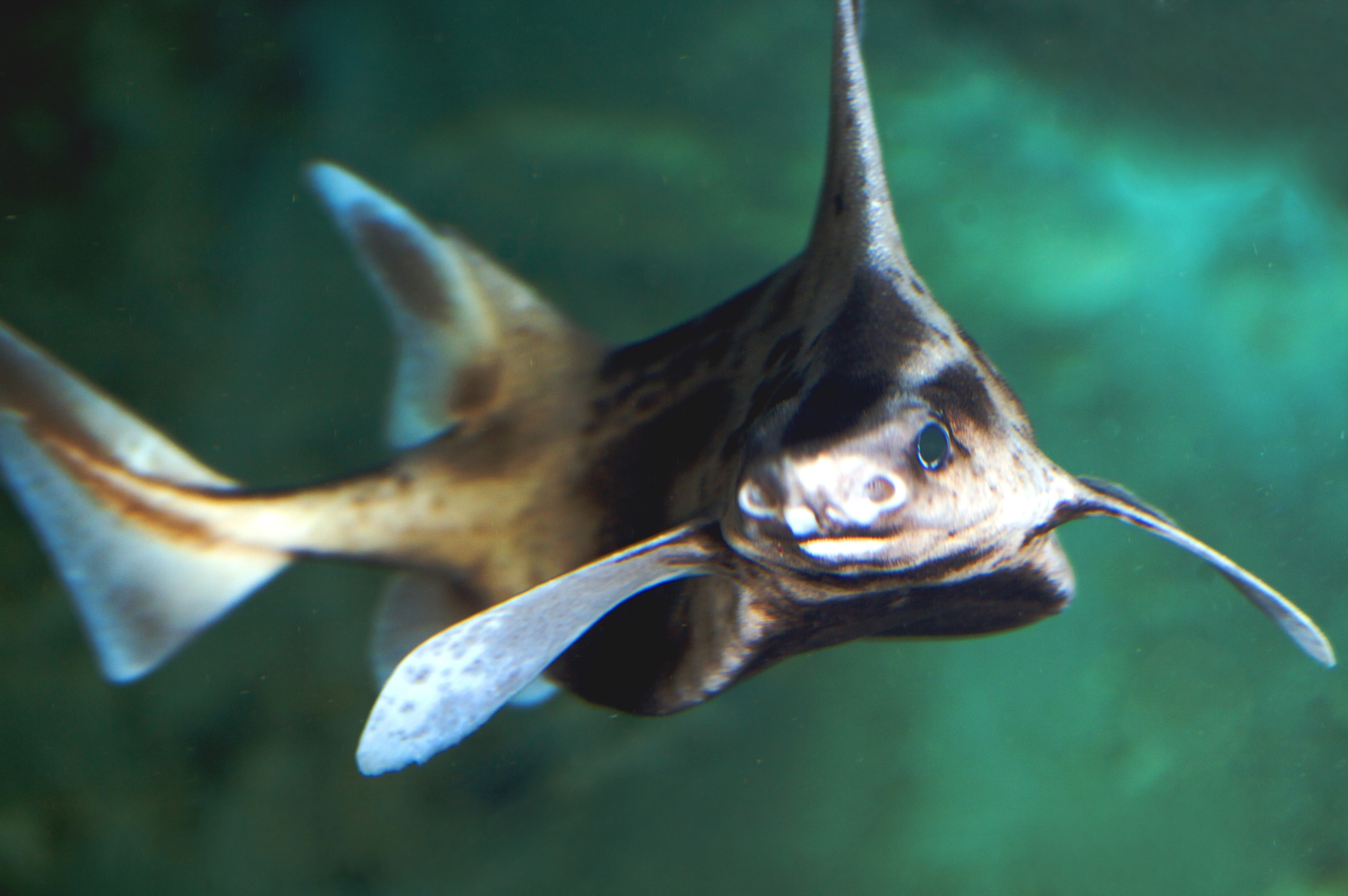

Conservation status
- Least Concern (IUCN 3.1)

Scientific classification
- Kingdom: Animalia
- Phylum: Chordata
- Class: Chondrichthyes
- Subclass: Elasmobranchii
- Division: Selachii
- Order: Squaliformes
- Family: Oxynotidae
- Genus: Oxynotus
- Species: O. caribbaeus

Binomial name
- Oxynotus caribbaeus Cervigón, 1961
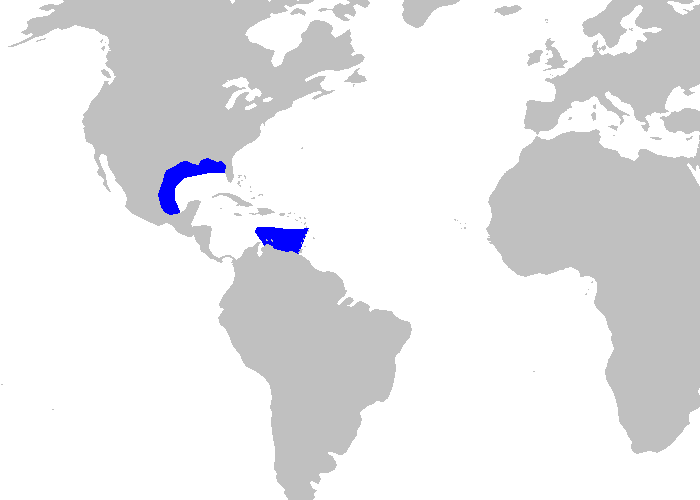
- Range of the Caribbean roughshark (in blue)

= Caribbean roughshark =

Species of shark

The Caribbean roughshark (Oxynotus caribbaeus) is a rough shark of the family Oxynotidae, found on the upper continental slopes of the Caribbean Sea, at depths between 400 and 450 m (1,310 and 1,480 ft). It reaches a length around 50 cm (20 in).

Oxynotus caribbaeus is thought to be a slow-moving predator of small benthic organisms. Not much is known about the lifecycle of this species, but it is being observed in its natural environment lately. This species is an uncommon bycatch of bottom trawls.

== Taxonomy ==
Venezuelan biologist Dr. Fernando Cervigón described this species as Oxynotus caribbaeus.

== Description ==
Oxynotus caribbaeus is a small shark found in the upper continental slope of Venezuela; it is easily distinguishable from other Oxynotus species. Adult males reach a maximum size of 50 cm (1.6 ft) in length and the females are thought to grow even longer, although none has been examined. The Caribbean roughshark has a short, blunt snout and head. This chubby-looking shark looks nothing like the typical shark. It has two dorsal fins that help differentiate this shark from other Oxynotus species. Its first dorsal fin is inclined forward, is very long and thick, and triangular in shape. The second dorsal fin is similar to the first, although it is not as long. However, as some other Oxynotus species, the Caribbean roughshark does not have an anal fin. It has the typical shark coarse dermal denticles, but these are atypically large for the size of the shark. It contains small, circular spiracles at the dorsal base of its head. The supraorbital ridges are not expanded and do not form a knob in front of the spiracles. It has lanceolate upper teeth, containing 12 rows and lower bladelike teeth containing 12 rows.

It has distinct color features that make it easily identifiable. On the head, body, and tail, it has light, greyish skin, patterned with dark bands and blotches, although it contains noticeably lighter color patterns on its pectoral fins and pelvic fins.

== Geographical habitat and ecology ==
Oxynotus caribbeaus is found in the western Atlantic Ocean, also near the bottom of the Gulf of Mexico and the Caribbean Sea. However, sightings of the Caribbean roughshark have happened in the waters off of the Bahamas, Honduras, and Venezuela.

It occupies water at a range of 400 and 450 m (1,310 and 1,480 ft). At that range, the water temperature is at about 10 °C. This means it has a bathydemersal habitat or is a demersal fish.

== Diet ==
Little is known about this shark, but due to its unusual dentition, the spear-shaped upper teeth and blade-like lower teeth, it feeds on invertebrates and fishes found near the bottom of their habitat.

== Breeding ==
This species of shark is an ovoviviparous species, meaning the embryos develop inside eggs, which are retained inside the mother's body until the eggs are ready to hatch. The sizes of these shark pups are thought to be 20 to 21 cm long, for both male and females examined.

== Threats and conservation ==
This species of shark lives in depths where deepwater fisheries operate, which can have a negative impact on a population of shark that is already uncommon and virtually unknown. Deepwater fisheries usually find O. caribbaeus as bycatch. As uncommon as it is found as a bycatch, it can still have a negative impact due to the small population observed in the inshore waters.

This shark has little to no commercial uses. Though when caught, the most probably use of O. caribbaeus is fishmeal or bait. Sometimes, it can be processed for oil or human consumption, by smoking and salting.
