= Biwia springeri =

Conservation status
- Least Concern (IUCN 3.1)

Scientific classification
- Kingdom: Animalia
- Phylum: Chordata
- Class: Actinopterygii
- Order: Cypriniformes
- Suborder: Cyprinoidei
- Family: Gobionidae
- Genus: Biwia
- Species: B. springeri

Binomial name
- Biwia springeri (Bănărescu & Nalbant, 1973)

Synonyms
- Abbottina springeri Bănărescu & Nalbant, 1973

Species of fish

Biwia springeri, the Korean dwarf gudgeon, is a species of ray-finned fish in the genus Biwia found in North and South Korea.

Named in honor of ichthyologist Victor G. Springer (b. 1928), U.S. National Museum, who collected the type specimen.
