= Shigeho Tanaka =

Japanese ichthyologist

Shigeho Tanaka (田中茂穂, Tanaka Shigeho, 1878–1974) was a Japanese ichthyologist and professor of zoology at the Imperial University of Tokyo. He published numerous works on fishes and sharks and co-authored a book on Japanese fish with famous American scientist David Starr Jordan.

== Publications ==
Jordan, D. S., S. Tanaka, and J. O. Snyder. 1913. A catalogue of the fishes of Japan. J. Coll. Sci. Imp. Univ. Tokyo, Vol. 33 (article 1): 1–497.

== Tribute ==
The genus Tanakia D. S. Jordan & W. F. Thompson 1914 was named for Tanaka, as an “accomplished” ichthyologist of the Imperial University of Tokyo, who described Tanakia shimazui in 1908 and Pseudorhodeus tanago in 1909.

== Taxon described by him ==
- See Category:Taxa named by Shigeho Tanaka
