= Carabus blaptoides blaptoides =

Scientific classification
- Domain: Eukaryota
- Kingdom: Animalia
- Phylum: Arthropoda
- Class: Insecta
- Order: Coleoptera
- Suborder: Adephaga
- Family: Carabidae
- Genus: Carabus
- Species: C. blaptoides
- Subspecies: C. b. blaptoides

Trinomial name
- Carabus blaptoides blaptoides (Kollar, 1836)

Synonyms
- Carabus lewisi Rye, 1872; Carabus goliath Morawitz, 1886; Carabus lineatipennis Hauser, 1921; Carabus multiseriatus Hauser, 1921; Carabus pseudooxuroides Hauser, 1921; Carabus hanae Chu, 1967; Carabus brevicaudus Imura & Mizusawa, 1995

Subspecies of beetle

Carabus blaptoides blaptoides is a subspecies of ground beetle from family Carabidae that is endemic to Japan.
