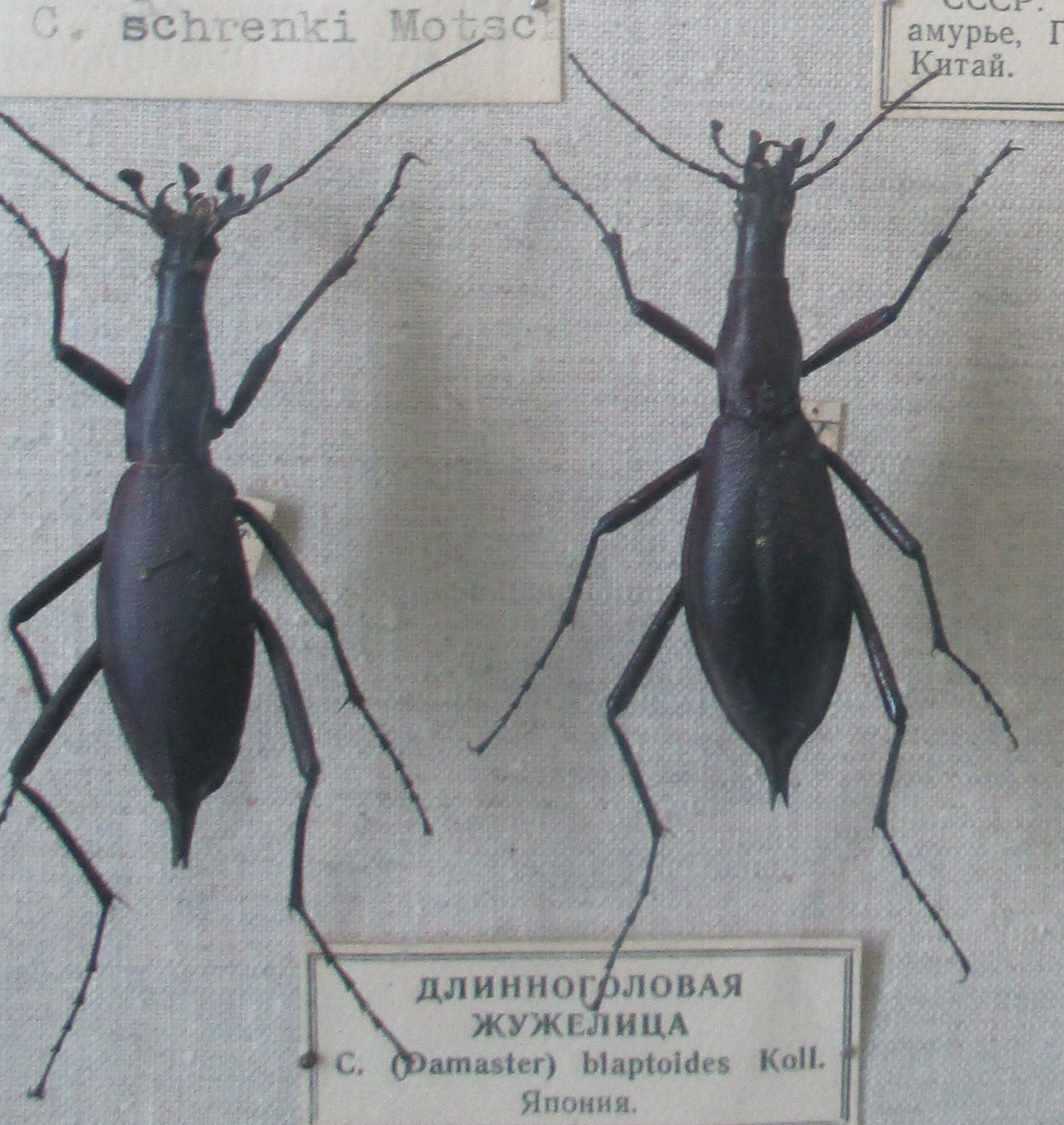

Scientific classification
- Domain: Eukaryota
- Kingdom: Animalia
- Phylum: Arthropoda
- Class: Insecta
- Order: Coleoptera
- Suborder: Adephaga
- Family: Carabidae
- Genus: Carabus
- Species: C. blaptoides

Binomial name
- Carabus blaptoides (Kollar, 1836)

= Carabus blaptoides =

Species of beetle

Carabus blaptoides (syn. Damaster blaptoides, Kollar, 1836) is a species of ground beetle in the family Carabidae that can be found in Japan and Russia. The species are black coloured, but could have either purple or green pronotum.

Subspecies include:

- Carabus blaptoides blaptoides
- Carabus blaptoides oxuroides
- Carabus blaptoides rugipennis
- †Carabus blaptoides hanae
