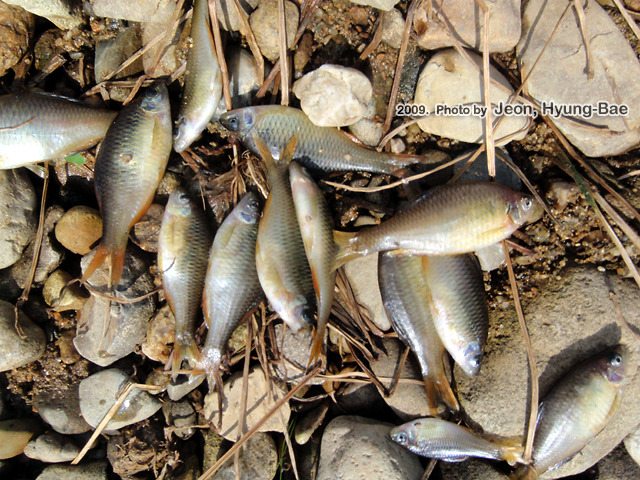

Conservation status
- Endangered (IUCN 3.1)

Scientific classification
- Kingdom: Animalia
- Phylum: Chordata
- Class: Actinopterygii
- Order: Cypriniformes
- Suborder: Cyprinoidei
- Family: Acheilognathidae
- Genus: Tanakia
- Species: T. somjinensis

Binomial name
- Tanakia somjinensis I. S. Kim & C. H. Kim, 1991

Synonyms
- Acheilognathus somjinensis (I. S. Kim & C. H. Kim, 1991)

= Tanakia somjinensis =

Species of fish

Tanakia somjinensis, also known as the Seomjin Bitterling, is an endangered species of ray-finned fish belonging to the family Acheilognathidae, the bitterlings. This fish is endemic to the Seomjin River system in the South Korea.
