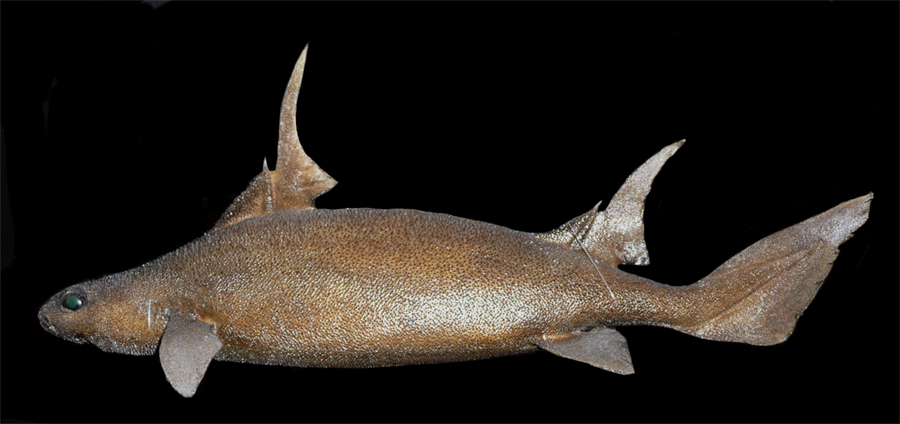

Conservation status
- Vulnerable (IUCN 3.1)

Scientific classification
- Kingdom: Animalia
- Phylum: Chordata
- Class: Chondrichthyes
- Subclass: Elasmobranchii
- Division: Selachii
- Order: Squaliformes
- Family: Oxynotidae
- Genus: Oxynotus
- Species: O. paradoxus

Binomial name
- Oxynotus paradoxus Frade, 1929
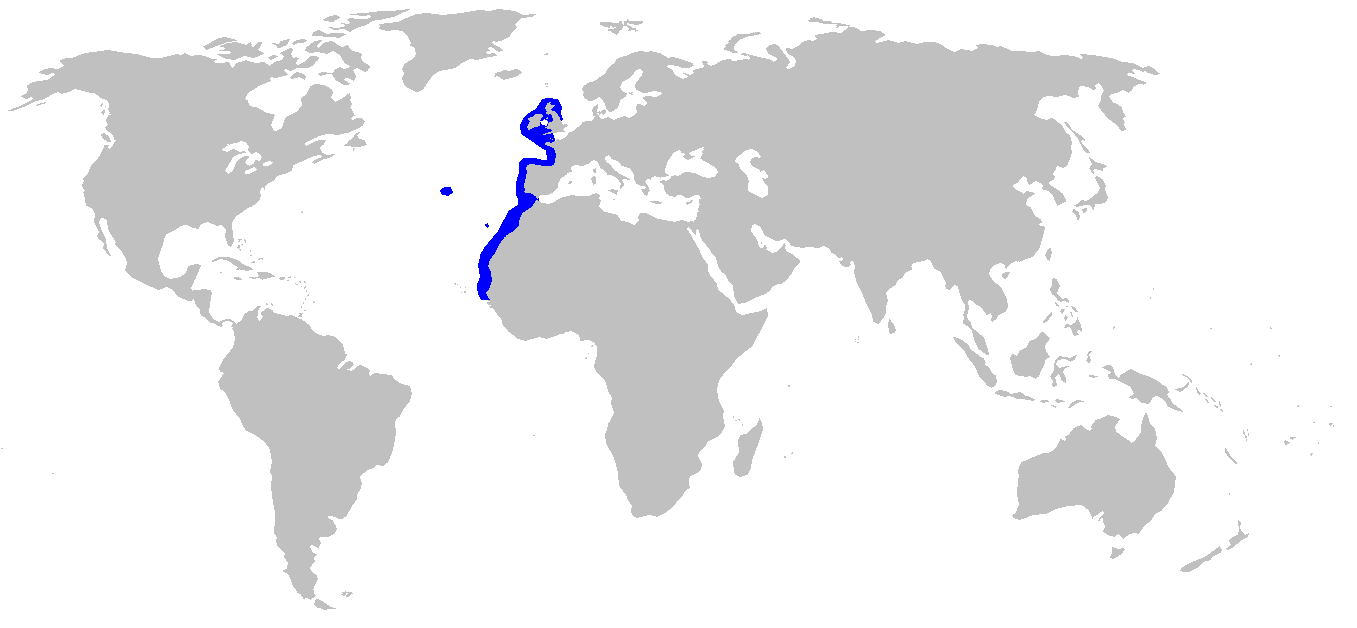
- Range of the sailfin roughshark

= Sailfin roughshark =

Species of shark

The sailfin roughshark (Oxynotus paradoxus) is a species of dogfish shark in the family Oxynotidae, found in the eastern North Atlantic from Scotland to Senegal between latitudes 61°N and 11°N, at depths of between 265 and 720 m (870 and 2,360 ft). Its length is up to 1.2 m (3 ft 11 in).

Its reproduction is ovoviviparous.

Oxynotus paradoxus is thought to be a slow-moving predator of small benthic animals. The sailfin roughsharks is found near the Eastern Atlantic Ocean at those depths. However, it has been reported to be found on the shores of Morocco, recently reported in the Mid-Atlantic Ridge, and in the Azores water. This species is an uncommon bycatch of bottom trawls, and is listed by the International Union for Conservation of Nature (IUCN) as Vulnerable.

== Taxonomy ==
French biologist F. Frade found this species of Oxynotus paradoxus. This name was later finalized and accepted by the scientific community as the official name for the species. Frade published his findings of this specimen in 1929 in the scientific journal Boletim da Sociedade Portuguesa de Ciências Naturais.

== Description ==
Oxynotus paradoxus is a rare shark found in the deep waters of the ocean from about 265–750 m (870–2,460 ft) below ocean level. At birth, O. paradoxus is about 25 cm (9.8 in) in length and can grow up to 118 cm (46 in) in length. Males reach maturity at a total length of around 75 centimetres (30 in). It has a compressed body form with a blunt snout and a wide, flattened head. O. paradoxus has two tall, narrow and pointed dorsal fins that contain concave trailing edges, but no anal fin. The first dorsal spine trails back, a unique feature of this species of Oxynotus. Both spiracles are relatively small compared to other sharks and are almost completely circular. The top teeth of O. paradoxus are lanceolate, but the lower teeth are blade-like. Each set of both upper and lower teeth contain 12 rows of teeth. The mouth is transverse and small in size, with thick lips. The gill slits are very short, and the eyes are large and oval-shaped, with a green colouration in live individuals. The flank dermal denticles contain a central cusp next to two lateral cusps and a second middle cusp above the primary cusp.

Of all the Atlantic Oxynotus species, O. paradoxus is the only species to have an incline first dorsal fin spine. The color of the shark when living is uniform dark brown, but it turns black in preserved specimens.

== Reproduction ==
This species of shark is an ovoviviparous species, meaning the embryos develop inside eggs, which are retained inside the mother's body until the eggs are ready to hatch. These shark pups are about 25 cm (9.8 in) in length.

== Geographical habitat and ecology ==
Oxynotus paradoxus lives in two separate places: the Northeast Atlantic and Eastern Central Atlantic. In the Northeast Atlantic they are found along the Atlantic slope of Scotland and the Mid-Atlantic Ridge. In the Eastern Central Atlantic they are found from Morocco southward to the Gulf of Guinea.

Based on the distribution of O. paradoxus, occupying a bathybenthic habitat, the species can be classified as a benthos organism with reproductive migrations to the continental shelf in spring.

O. paradoxus is found in the depths of 265–800 m (870–2,620 ft) below sea level. Due to their poor ability to swim, they use their relatively large and oil-filled livers to maintain their buoyancy.

== Diet ==
The diet of O. paradoxus is largely unknown; however, from reported sightings of the shark, it has been identified that they feast on small benthic fish and invertebrates, as well as crustaceans.

== Threat and conservation ==
Since this species lives in the depths where deepwater fisheries operate, they can have a negative impact on the already uncommon species by being the bycatch of these offshore fisheries. Although their population is unknown, most of its population is in the deeper offshore waters and very few are in the inshore waters.

Although this shark is a bycatch by offshore fisheries, it has little to no commercial uses. When caught, the most probable use of O. paradoxus is as fishmeal or bait.
