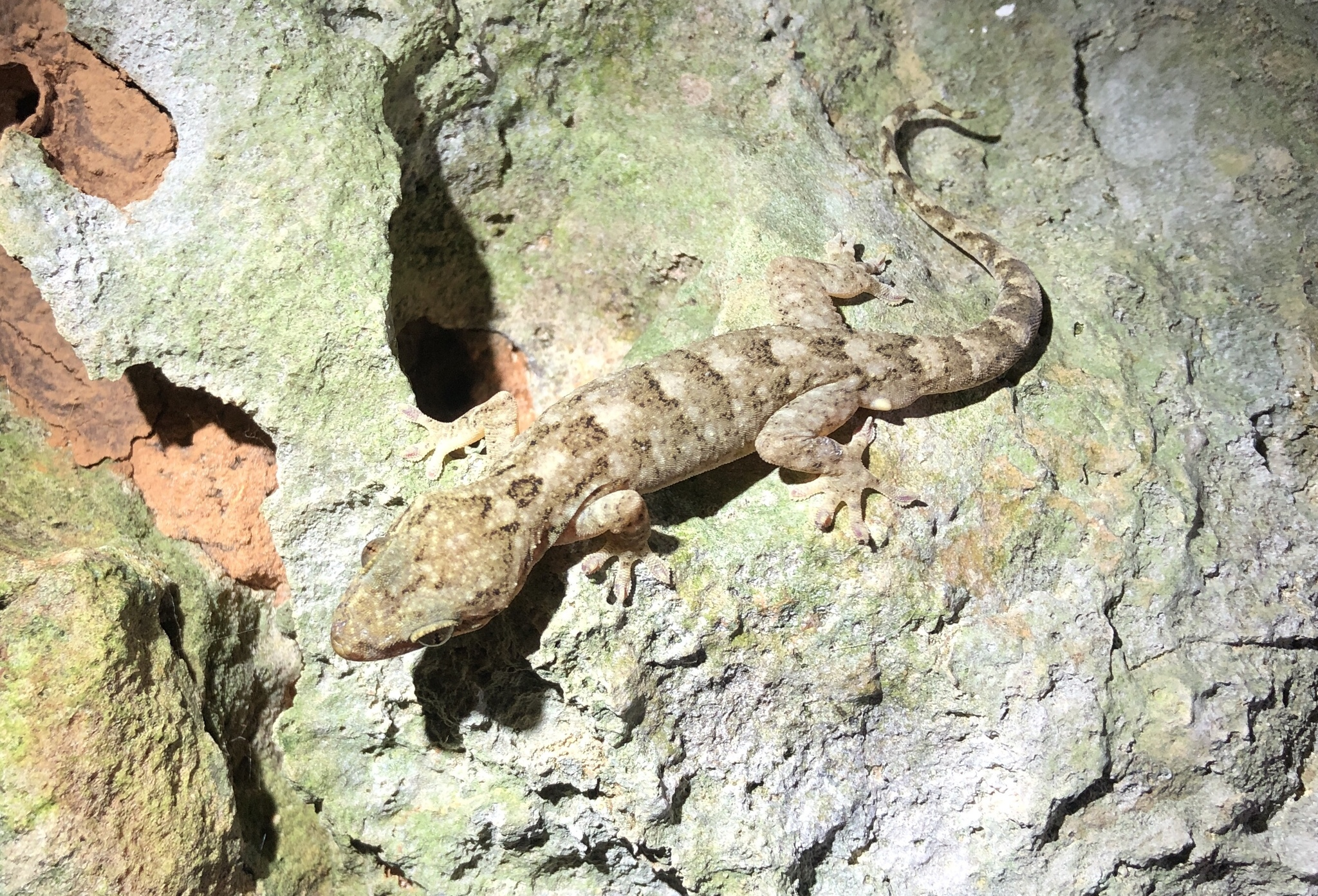

Conservation status
- Least Concern (IUCN 3.1)

Scientific classification
- Kingdom: Animalia
- Phylum: Chordata
- Class: Reptilia
- Order: Squamata
- Suborder: Gekkota
- Family: Gekkonidae
- Genus: Gekko
- Species: G. hokouensis

Binomial name
- Gekko hokouensis Pope, 1928
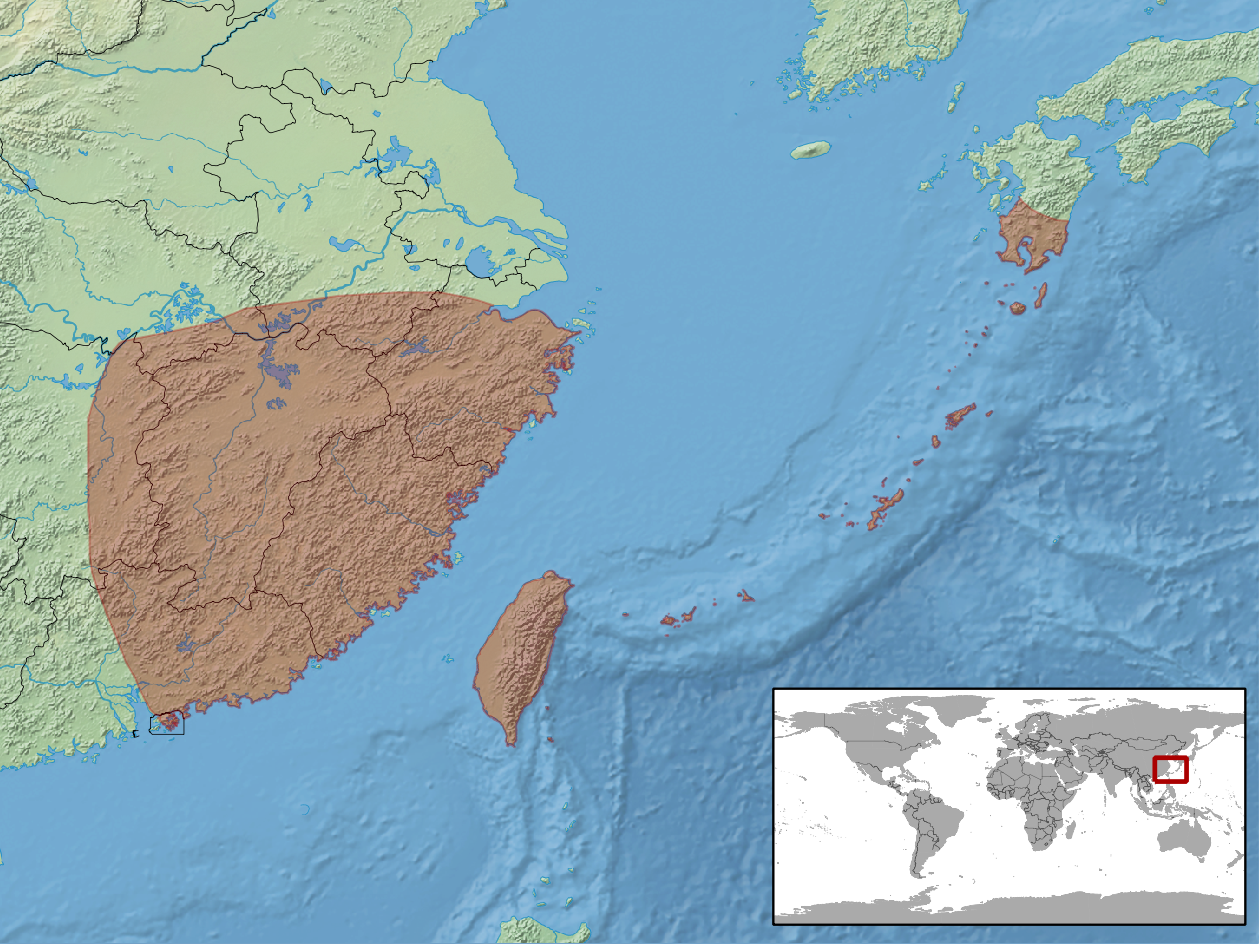

Synonyms
- Gekko japonicus hokouensis; Hemidactylus marmoratus; Gehyra intermedia; Peropus intermedius; Gekko hokounensis; Gekko hokuensis; Luperosaurus amissus

= Gekko hokouensis =

Species of lizard

Gekko hokouensis, also known as the Hokou gecko or Kwangsi gecko, is a species of gecko. G. hokouensis is a small, nocturnal, arboreal, insectivorous gecko with reproduction occurring largely in the summertime. This species can be distinguished by subtle differences in body color and pattern as well as by the numbers and shape of some scales. Generally, G. hokouensis is colored with shades of brown, grey, or tan and has distinct, darker cross-bands on its back and tail. Its back and limbs are covered with small, granular scales intermixed with small, subconical tubercles that are larger and more numerous along the upper sides of the back. A key diagnostic feature is the presence of a large, undivided tubercular scale located on each side of the base of the tail. Additionally, as an adult, this species has a snout-vent length of roughly 60 mm.

== Taxonomy ==
The species was first described by the American herpetologist Clifford H. Pope in 1928 as Gekko japonicus subsp. hokouensis. G. hokouensis belongs to the subgenus Japonigecko, and was reclassified as a distinct species in 1982. The species is currently defined morphologically and may include genetically divergent populations. There are no subspecies recognized for Gekko hokouensis.

== Genetics ==
G. hokouensis has 19 pairs of chromosomes, and unlike many other squamate reptiles, its karyotype does not include microchromosomes. This microchromosome disappearance has been attributed to repeated fusions between microchromosomes and or macrochromosomes in the ancestral karyotype of squamate reptiles. Sex chromosome evolution and sex-determining mechanisms within this species are diverse. Differentiation between Z and W homologs of Dmrt1, a sex-determining gene, has been found to occur independently in different populations of G. hokouensis.

Due to incomplete reproductive isolation, G. hokouensis has been shown to hybridize with other species of gecko, like Gekko yakuensis. The ability to hybridize and higher population growth rates has caused species replacement of G. yakuensis with G. hokouensis in southern Kyushu, Japan. However, the possibility of asymmetric assortative mating influencing the later stages of species replacement cannot be ruled out. Additionally, more comprehensive genetic studies have reported hybridization among other sympatric pairs of Japanese gekko, including G. japonicus and G. tawaenesis, G. hokouensis and G. vertebralis, and G. yakuensis and Gekko sp. A.

Genetic analysis has revealed sympatric cryptic species within G. hokouensis. Two morphologically similar species have been identified on the islands of the Okinawa Group and the central Ryukyus. Although the identified species have diagnostic external characteristics of G. hokouensis, they are reproductively isolated and genetically distinct entities. One species was identified as the original G. hokouensis population; the other a new, undescribed species endemic to the Okinawa Islands. Further phylogenetic analyses are needed to determine what evolutionary phenomena are responsible for the morphological similarity of the genetically divergent species.

== Distribution ==
G. hokouensis natural range includes southern Kyushu, Ryukyu Archipelago (except several islands), Taiwan (including Lanyus and Guishan islets), and southern and central eastern continental China. The species has also been found in the Nakadorijima and Hirashima islands near northwestern Kyushu, Yabitsu of Wakayama Prefecture, western Honshu, and Hachijojima Islands of the Izu Group. After G. japonicus, G. hokouensis has the second widest distribution area in the Japanese archipelago, occupying the forests and their edges, shrubs, and urban areas. Having significantly contracted during the last ice age, the suitable habitats for G. hokouensis and Gekko sp. are now expanding as the climate warms. They are found near human and urban habitations but also tend toward montane settings like secondary forests, rocky cliffs, and rock crevices at altitudes below 1,000 meters.

== Evolution ==
Phylogenetic analysis has revealed that G. hokouensis is a sister clade with Gekko swinhonis, and this clade is a sister with G. japonicus. In or near the Kyushu island of Japan, different populations of G. hokouensis have experienced evolution over time. In mainland Kyushu, G. hokouensis has long been native to urban areas of southern Kagoshima Prefecture, suggesting a balance of dominance with G. japonicus, which has spread from northern Kyushu. The Ibusuki and Central Koshiki populations have remained stable in size since the last ice age and have not exhibited any bottleneck events, respectively. Contrastingly, the Goto population faced a bottleneck roughly 1,000 years ago, with mitochondrial DNA suggesting that this population stemmed from the western Satsuma Peninsula.

== Invasiveness ==
The origin of the first introduction of G. hokouensis to nonnatural habitats is unknown, but the route of invasive entry appears to be from accidental transfer with building materials or garden trees through human activity and shipping. In one study, G. hokouensis populations, found in four villages, were characterized by ports that had regular vessel sails from areas by which the species is common, further pointing towards a hitchhiking introduction pattern that has been documented globally. Invasive populations have been found in Hacijojima Island of Japan since around 1980, with invasive distributions including Kanagawa, Shizuoka, and Wakayama prefectures in addition to the Nakadorijima, Hirashima, Yakushima, Shikoku, and Izu islands. In the Koshikishima Islands, recent incursions by G. japonicus and G. hokouensis have nullified the previously competition-free zones for Gekko sp. Yet, due to its large distribution, the IUCN lists the species as least concern.

== Behavior ==
In both its native and nonnative ranges, the gecko preys predominantly on insects and follows a nocturnal behavior pattern. Beyond insects, G. hokouensis diet consists of other arthropods and possibly fruits from inside human houses, possibly risking mortality during predation on some spiders. Excluding a predation case of a juvenile Okinawa Tree Lizard (Diploderma polygonatum), G. hokouensis has been considered a strict insectivore. Yet, in one study, the species was observed to feed on plant materials, possibly derived from feeding on tree sap or nectar.

In several Gekko species, including G. hokouensis, males produce low amplitude calls and exhibit a tail-waiving display when courting females. The courtship call is composed of repetitive elements of multiple frequencies across a broadband spectrum with a very regular pattern. The temporal pattern in this call may convey some information about the male signaler, such as species identity, as in many frogs and insects. Female geckos have been shown to discriminate between the conspecific calls from white noise and tended to approach conspecific calls.

== Growth and Reproduction ==
It has been reported that G. hokouensis reaches sexual maturity at 1 to 2 years and some females can begin laying eggs one year after hatching. The species is characterized by a small, fixed (or nearly fixed) clutch size, breeding between April to August. Females are capable of having multiple clutches throughout breeding season, up until the end of July when egg production concludes. This reproduction patterns differs from that of tropical geckos, and is common to other subtropical and temperate geckos.

G. hokouensis hatchlings generally appear between July and November. Their growth rate dramatically increases during the spring and summer, less in autumn, and minimally during the winter. After reaching maturity, the growth rate of females has been reported to be significantly greater than that of males.

== Management ==
In its new range, G. hokouensis has predated against native species, primarily insects. The species is not highly concerning, due to its large distribution, and may aid in pest control, serving as local predators. In Japan, there are no active control programs or management actions for prevention, mitigation, control, or eradication of this species.
