= Fernando Cervigón =

Spanish ichthyologist and marine biologist

Dr. Fernando Cervigón
- Born: May 15, 1930; Valencia
- Died: May 17, 2017 (aged 87); Caracas
- Scientific career
- Fields: Ichthyology

Fernando Cervigón Marcos (born Valencia on 15 May 1930, died Caracas 17 May 2017) was a Spanish ichthyologist and marine biologist, who lived most of his life in Venezuela. He discovered and described numerous species of fish including the Caribbean roughshark and is author of numerous works on fish and Venezuela's ocean environment including Los Peces Marinos de Venezuela. He was the president of the Museo del Mar on Margarita Island, Nueva Esparta, Venezuela.

== Early life ==
Fernando Cervigón Marcos was born in Valencia, Spain, on 15 May 1930. His secondary education was undertaken at the Colegio de Hermans Maristas between 1940 and 1948. In 1948 he matriculated at the University of Barcelona and he graduated for there with a Bachelor's degree in Natural Sciences. He completed a post-graduate course in 1958 and obtained a doctorate in Biological Sciences in 1964. His thesis for his doctorate was entitled Los Peces Marinos de Venezuela ("The marine fishes of Venezuela") and was classified as "outstanding cum laude". In 1960 he had moved to Venezuela settling in the Macanao Peninsula on Margarita Island where he began to study the fish.

== Career ==
Cervigón was appointed as scientific director of the Estación de Investigaciones Marinas de Margarita ("Margarita Marine Research Station") of the La Salle Foundation for Nature in 1961 and he remained in post until 1970 when he was appointed as a Professor-Researcher at the Universidad de Oriente, where he remained until 1980. While at the Universidad de Oriente he held the position of director of the Oceanographic Institute in Cumaná in 1973–74 and from the Nuclear Scientific Research Centre of at Nueva Esparta which he held until 1980. He retired in 1990 as full professor in 1990. He was commissioned by the UNESCO regional office to teach courses and attend conferences in a number of Latin American nations and was a Food and Agriculture Organization Consultant in 1977–78 and 1991. He visited Chile and Colombia on several occasions between 1970 and 1995 working at a number of institutions, where, in addition to teaching ichthyology courses, he directed several professorial and postgraduate theses.

During his career Cervigón discovered and described many species of fish. He was the author of several works on the fish, and on the coastal and ocean environment. of Venezuela. Among these was the multi volume Los Peces Marinos de Venezuela ("The Marine Fish of Venezuela") which started publication in 1966 with its first two volumes, with the sixth and final volume being published in 2011. He was also the founder and president of the Museo del Mar, on the island of Margarita, Nueva Esparta, Venezuela. In addition, he was a founder of the Universidad Monteávila of Caracas, where he served as Academic Vice President, professor, lecturer and here he published some more work in the humanities rather than pure science. During his long career he was awarded many recognitions and distinctions, both academic and civil, including the Venezuelan National Science Prize in 1988. In 2002, he was elected as a member of the Academy of Physical, Mathematical and Natural Sciences of Venezuela. Cervigón had a long career and a deep influence in the development of marine science and ichthyology in Venezuela, and was regarded as the father of that Science in Venezuela.

As stated above Cervigón had a wide set on interests and in addition to his ichthyological publications he published many books on other aspects of nature, the human culture of the islanders of Nueva Esparta and had interests in regional history and its place in Venezuela. After a lengthy illness, Cervigón died in Caracas on 15 May 2017.

== Taxon described by him ==
- See Category:Taxa named by Fernando Cervigón

== Taxon named in his honor ==
- The Spotfin porgy, Calamus cervigoni Randall & Caldwell, 1966
- The West African catshark, Scyliorhinus cervigoni Maurin & Bonnet, 1970
- The finspot ray, Rostroraja cervigoni (Bigelow & Schroeder, 1964)
