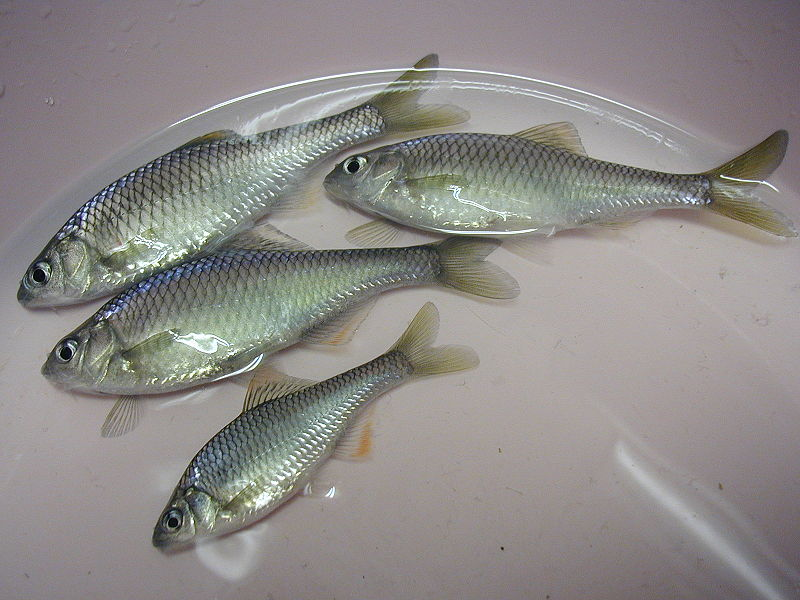

Scientific classification
- Kingdom: Animalia
- Phylum: Chordata
- Class: Actinopterygii
- Order: Cypriniformes
- Suborder: Cyprinoidei
- Family: Acheilognathidae
- Genus: Tanakia
- Species: T. lanceolata

Binomial name
- Tanakia lanceolata (Temminck & Schlegel, 1846)

Synonyms
- Capoeta lanceolata Temminck & Schlegel, 1846; Acheilognathus lanceolata (Temminck & Schlegel, 1846); Acheilognathus lanceolatus (Temminck & Schlegel, 1846)

= Tanakia lanceolata =

Species of fish

Tanakia lanceolata is a temperate freshwater ray-finned fish belonging to the family Acheilognathidae, the bitterlings. It originates in inland waterways in China, Japan and the Korean peninsula. It was originally described as Capoeta lanceolata by Temminck & Schlegel in 1846, and has also been referred to as Acheilognathus lanceolata and Acheilognathus lanceolatus in scientific publications. Its Korean name is 납자루 (napjaru, meaning "slender bitterling"), and in Japanese is known as ヤリタナゴ (槍鱮 - yaritanago)
