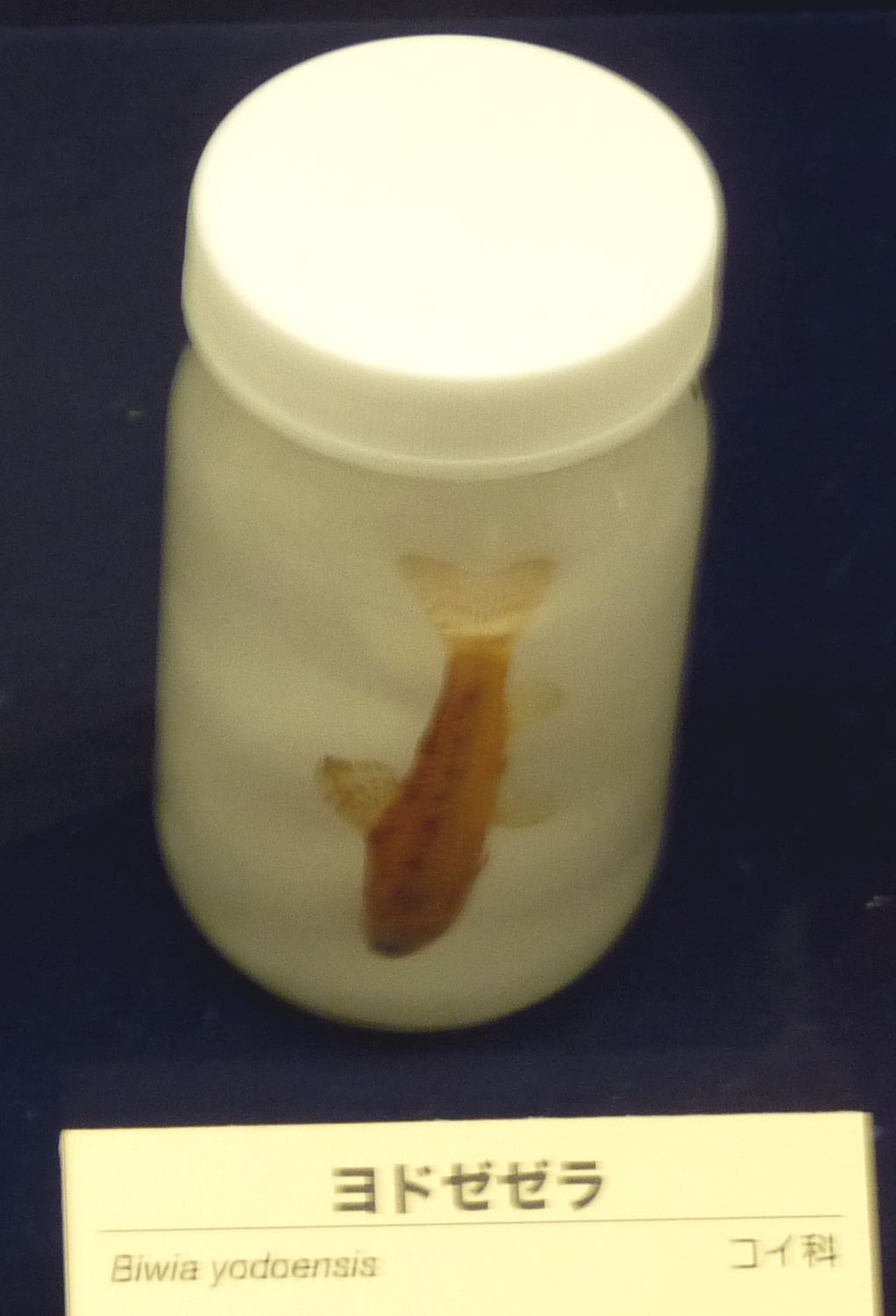

Conservation status
- Endangered (IUCN 3.1)

Scientific classification
- Kingdom: Animalia
- Phylum: Chordata
- Class: Actinopterygii
- Order: Cypriniformes
- Suborder: Cyprinoidei
- Family: Gobionidae
- Genus: Biwia
- Species: B. yodoensis

Binomial name
- Biwia yodoensis Kawase & Hosoya, 2010

= Biwia yodoensis =

Species of fish

Biwia yodoensis is a species of freshwater ray-finned fish belonging to the family Gobionidae, the gudgeons. This species is found in the Yodo River basin in Japan.
