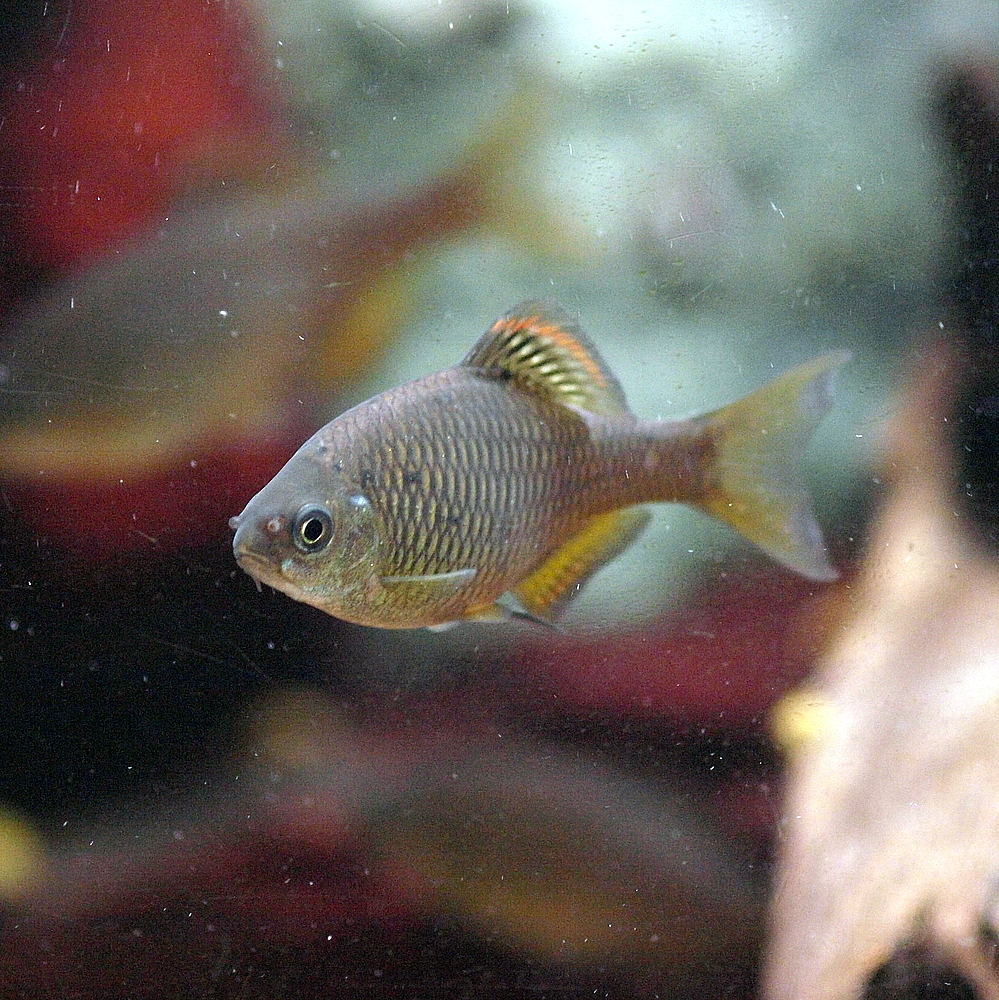

Conservation status
- Least Concern (IUCN 3.1)

Scientific classification
- Kingdom: Animalia
- Phylum: Chordata
- Class: Actinopterygii
- Order: Cypriniformes
- Suborder: Cyprinoidei
- Family: Acheilognathidae
- Genus: Tanakia
- Species: T. limbata

Binomial name
- Tanakia limbata (Temminck & Schlegel, 1846)

Synonyms
- Capoeta limbata Temminck & Schlegel, 1846; Acheilognathus limbatus (Temminck & Schlegel, 1846); Rhodeus oryzae Jordan & Seale, 1906

= Oily bitterling =

Species of fish

The oily bitterling (Tanakia limbata) is a temperate freshwater ray-finned fish belonging to the family Acheilognathidae, the bitterlings.. It originates in creeks with fast-running water in central and southern Japan. It was originally described as Capoeta limbata by Temminck & Schlegel in 1846, and has also been referred to as Acheilognathus limbatus and Acheilognathus limbata in scientific literature. The fish reaches a size of up to 6 cm (2.4 in) TL.
