= Ishikawa Chiyomatsu =

Japanese zoologist (1861–1935)

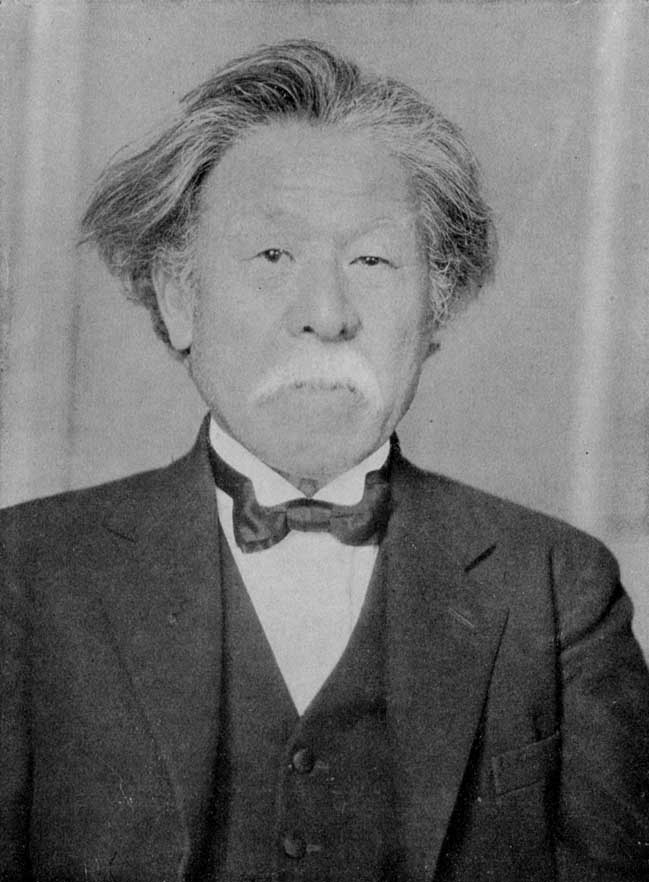
- Born: January 30, 1861; Tokyo, Japan
- Died: January 17, 1935 (aged 73)
- Other name: 石川 千代松
- Occupations: biologist, zoologist
- Children: Son:Ishikawa Kin'ichi

Ishikawa Chiyomatsu (石川 千代松; January 30, 1861 – January 17, 1935) was a Japanese biologist, zoologist, evolutionary theorist, and ichthyologist at the Naples Zoological Station starting 1887. He was responsible for disseminating Darwin's ideas on evolution in Japan.

== Biography ==
Ishikawa Chiyomatsu was born in Edo as a son of a high-ranking samurai, a Hatamoto. But the Meiji Restoration occurred and when the Tokugawa shogunate collapsed, he moved to Sunpu (Shizuoka prefecture) in 1867. In 1872, he returned to Tokyo and studied English. He entered the Tokyo Kaisei Gakko, which was a high education college belonging Ministry of Education in 1876. His was taught by Montague Arthur Fenton, which influenced Chiyomatsu to start a collection of butterflies.

Chiyomatsu entered the Tokyo Imperial University in 1878, and studied under Edward S. Morse. After Morse left Japan, his teachers were Charles Otis Whitman and Kakichi Mitsukuri. After graduating from the Tokyo Imperial University, he studied in Germany under eminent evolutionary theorist August Weismann.

He was also the 5th principal of the Dokkyo Middle School in Tokyo.

== Relatives ==
- Son: Ishikawa Kin'ichi (石川欣一)--journalist
- Daughter: Ishikawa Kiyo(石川きよ)--Married with Akira Terao (寺尾新), son of Hisashi Terao (寺尾寿), Astronomer.
- Father of wife: Mitsukuri Rinsho—statesman and legal scholar in Meiji period, Japan

== See also ==
- Category:Taxa named by Ishikawa Chiyomatsu
