= Rhodeus mantschuricus =

Scientific classification
- Kingdom: Animalia
- Phylum: Chordata
- Class: Actinopterygii
- Order: Cypriniformes
- Family: Acheilognathidae
- Genus: Rhodeus
- Species: R. mantschuricus

Binomial name
- Rhodeus mantschuricus Mori, 1934

Species of fish

Rhodeus mantschuricus is a species of freshwater ray-finned fish belonging to the family Acheilognathidae, the bitterlings. This taxon has been regarded as a synonym of the Amur bitterling (R. sericeus) but Eschmeyer's Catalog of Fishes treats it as a valid species. It is found in the basin of the Amur in Eastern Asia.
