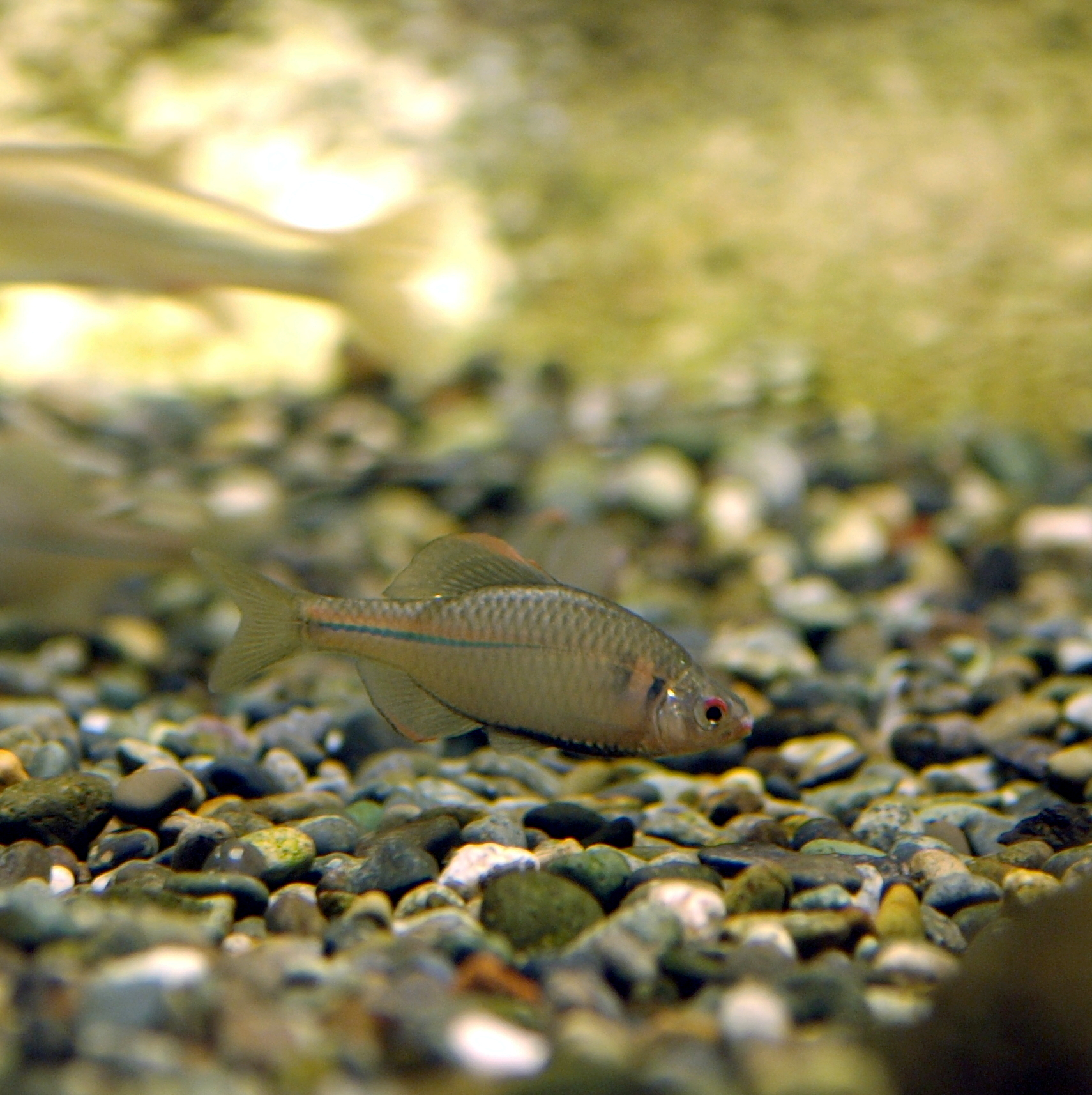

Conservation status
- Near Threatened (IUCN 3.1)

Scientific classification
- Kingdom: Animalia
- Phylum: Chordata
- Class: Actinopterygii
- Order: Cypriniformes
- Suborder: Cyprinoidei
- Family: Acheilognathidae
- Genus: Rhodeus
- Species: R. atremius

Binomial name
- Rhodeus atremius (D. S. Jordan & W. F. Thompson, 1914)

Synonyms
- Acanthorhodeus atremius Jordan & Thompson, 1914

= Kyushu bitterling =

Species of fish

The Kyushu bitterling (Rhodeus atremius) is a temperate freshwater ray-finned fish belonging to the family Acheilognathidae, the bitterlings. It originates on Kyushu Island in Japan. It was originally described as Acanthorhodeus atremius by Jordan & Thompson in 1914. The fish reaches a size of up to 6 cm (2.5 in), and is native to freshwater habitats with a pH of 6.8 to 7.8, a hardness of 20 DH, and a temperature of 10 to 25 °C (50 to 77 °F).

When spawning, the females deposit their eggs inside bivalves, where they hatch and the young remain until they can swim.

There were two currently recognised subspecies, Rhodeus atremius atremius and R. a. suigensis, but suigensis is now considered to be a separate valid species Rhodeus suigensis.
