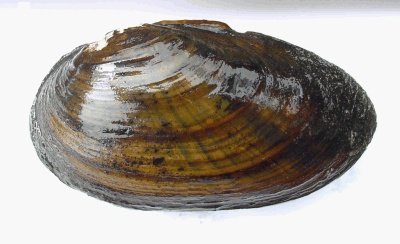
- Unio crassus from Lužnice River, Czech Republic

Conservation status
- Endangered (IUCN 3.1)

Scientific classification
- Kingdom: Animalia
- Phylum: Mollusca
- Class: Bivalvia
- Order: Unionida
- Family: Unionidae
- Genus: Unio
- Species: U. crassus

Binomial name
- Unio crassus Philipsson in Retzius, 1788
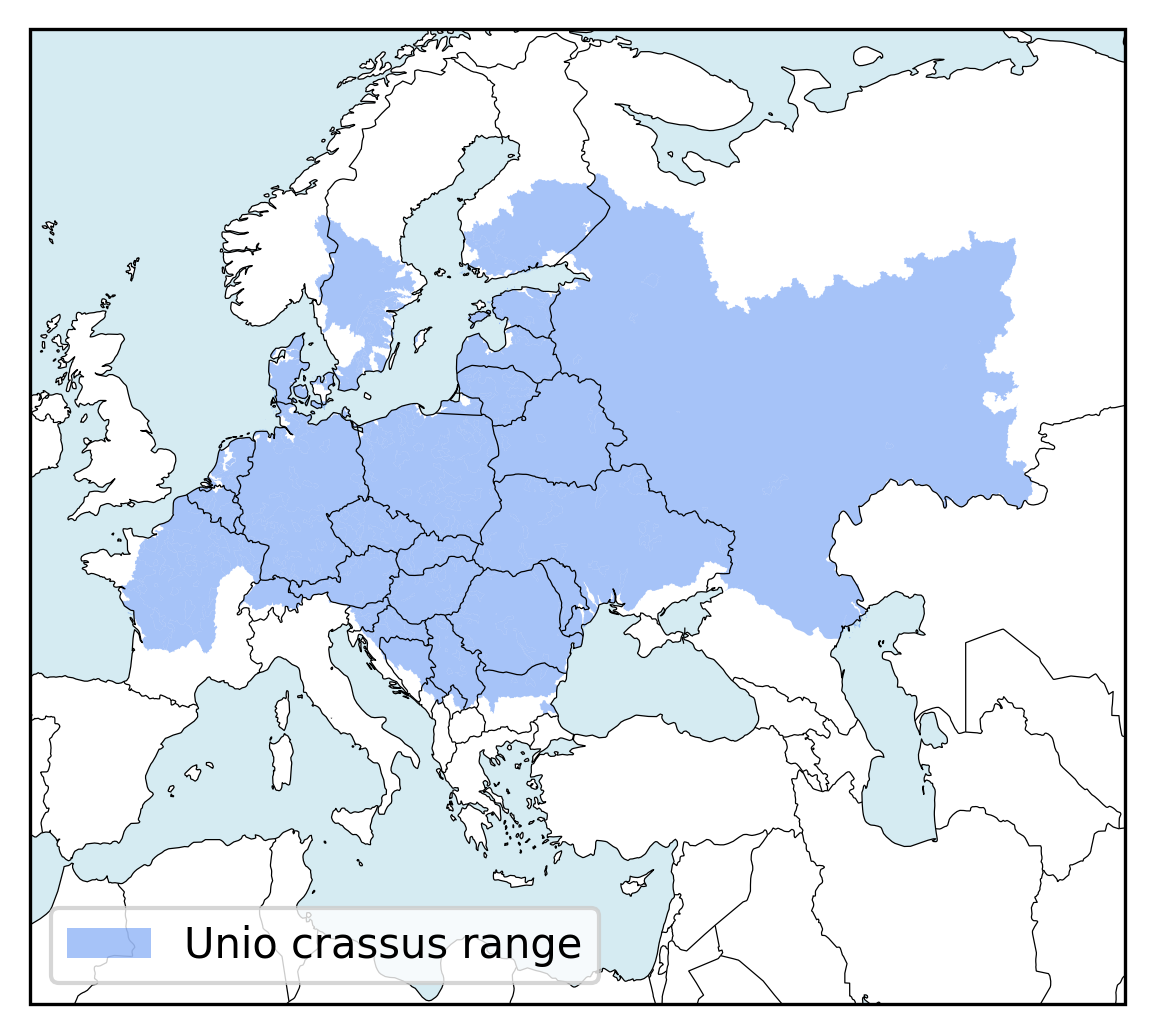

= Unio crassus =

Thick shelled river mussel

Species of bivalve

Unio crassus, the thick shelled river mussel, is a species of freshwater mussel, an aquatic bivalve mollusk in the family Unionidae, the river mussels.

== Taxonomy ==
The species was split into two species, Unio crassus and Unio tumidiformis, in 2009. Various subspecies have been noted, but their validity is not always recognized. Recently, two clades and possible subspecies, Unio crassus crassus and Unio crassus courtillieri, have been identified based on genetic sampling.

== Geography ==
It occurs across much of Europe, excluding Britain, Italy, and the Iberian Peninsula. Its range extends from France in the west to the Ural River basin in Russia and Kazakhstan in the east, and it historically occupied most major river systems. It is considered extirpated from the Netherlands, where it was last seen in 1967.

== Description ==
Unio crassus is known for its thick-walled shell. Individuals are generally 3–7 cm in length, though some reach 9–11 cm. The size and shape of the shell may vary by population or by environmental factors.

== Habitat ==
The species lives in large streams and rivers with clear water, though it is more tolerant of silt than other threatened species. Due to its sensitivity to pollution, it is considered a bioindicator for water quality. It prefers slower-flowing waters on the banks or near roots, boulders, or other features.

It is especially vulnerable to changes in water chemistry that affect local fish populations, such as nitrate and phosphate concentrations.

== Ecology ==
Its lifespan can be up to 80 years, depending on the water temperature, with an average of 20–30 years. It often forms colonies in large streams and rivers with clear, free-flowing water. It buries itself in the stream bed, leaving only its siphons exposed; through these it inhales oxygen and food (algae and microorganisms) and expels waste. It can move several meters, sometimes farther, to find suitable habitat conditions.

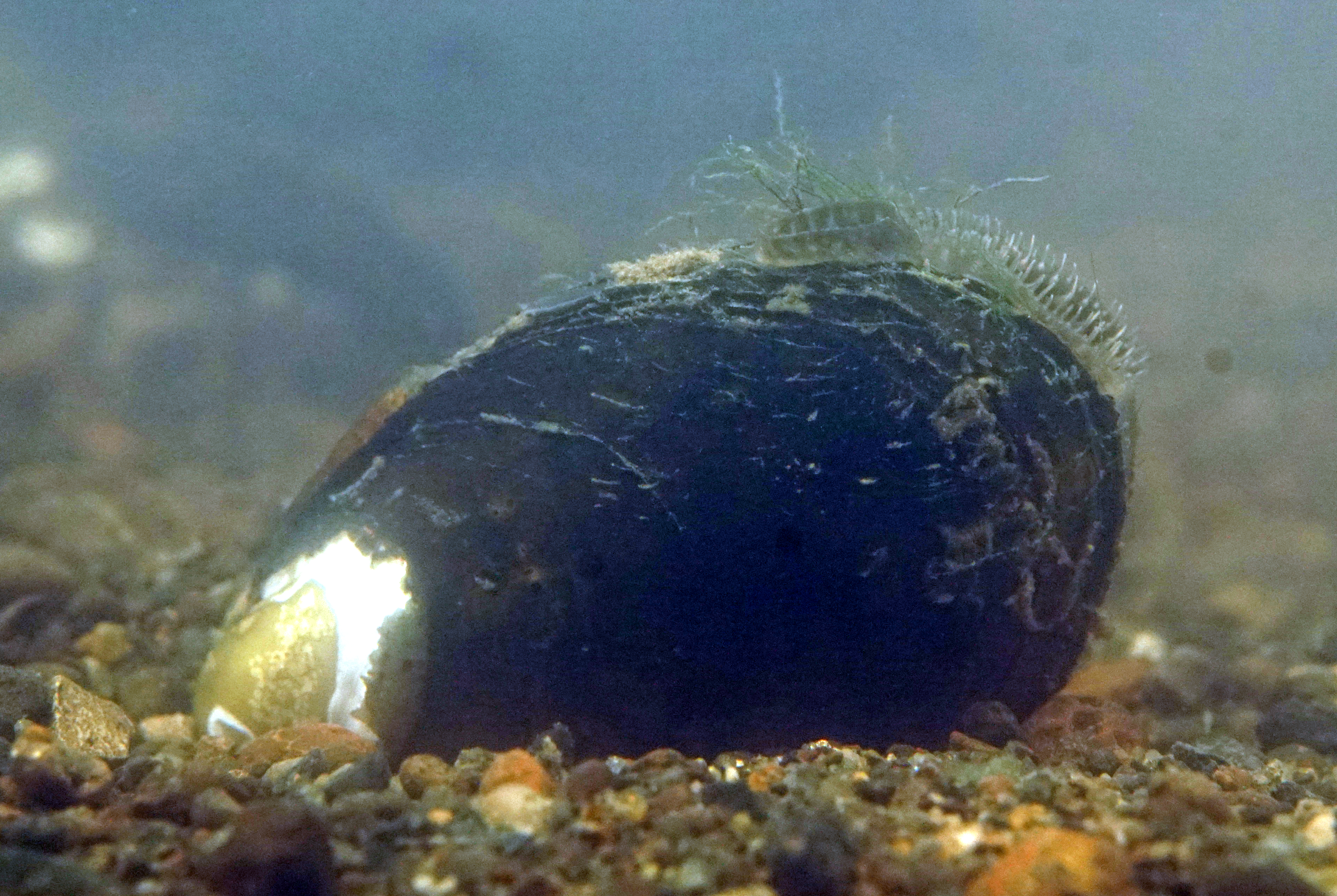
Thick shelled river mussel in a small river

They are tachytictic (short-term) breeders, meaning the cycle from fertilization to juvenile takes place in one season. In the spring, males release their spermatozoa into the water, and females take them in through siphoning. Females can have several broods of eggs per year. The eggs develop for a few weeks until the larvae are ready for release. Like most Unionidae mussels, the larvae have a parasitic stage in which they must attach to and feed off a host fish. In spring and summer, the female releases around 100,000 glochidia into the water current.

The female has a distinctive method of dispersing the larvae. She crawls up to the edge of the water, exposing her excurrent aperture, and then releases a stream of water containing glochidia (larvae). It has been suggested that this spurting behavior may lure host fish that are attracted to the water disturbance. The larvae can then attach to the fish's gills. (video of spurting mussel)

The glochidia attach to the gills of a fish and remain for 20–50 days while they metamorphose into juvenile mussels, after which they drop off and bury themselves in the stream bed for 1–3 years.

The most frequent host fishes have been identified as bullhead (Cottus gobio), minnow (Phoxinus phoxinus), chub (Leuciscus cephalus and Squalius cephalus), rudd (Scardinius erythrophthalmus), bleak (Alburnus alburnus), nase (Chondrostoma nasus), stickleback (Gasterosteus aculeatus), ide (Leuciscus idus) and perch (Perca fluviatilis). The larvae are not able to metamorphose on roach (Rutilus rutilus) or sterlet (Acipenser ruthenus). The most suitable host fish can vary by locality and population. For example, in the Danube drainage, European chub (Squalius cephalus) is considered the most suitable host for U. crassus. Invasive species such as round goby (Neogobius melanostomus) and rainbow trout (Oncorhynchus mykiss) were also unable to keep larvae alive.

== Use by humans ==
Freshwater mussels were consumed by prehistoric people in Central Europe. Archaeological evidence from shell collections in Hungary dating as far back as the Neolithic period indicates that several mussel species were gathered from a nearby river and consumed raw as an important supplementary food source. Unio crassus appears to have been a preferred species, likely because of its relatively high meat content. Unio shells used as tools, including those of U. crassus, have been found at archaeological sites dating to the 5th millennium BC.

Unio crassus was also one of several mussels used to make ornamental buttons between 4200 and 3800 BC in central Europe. Widespread occurrence of these ornaments, from Denmark to Romania, indicates trade or cross-cultural exchange of knowledge. The white hue of the nacre was highly sought after. Freshwater mother-of-pearl was used in ornaments through the Middle Ages.

The species was used as livestock fodder in Central Europe in the 19th century. Today, it is still used as fodder for poultry in Romania, and for human consumption in some areas.

== Use as a host ==
In addition to being a parasite in its larval stage, the thick-shelled river mussel also acts as a host for the endangered European bitterling (Rhodeus amarus). The bitterling's eggs must develop in the gills of freshwater mussels. Bitterling egg-infested mussels may have reduced growth rates.

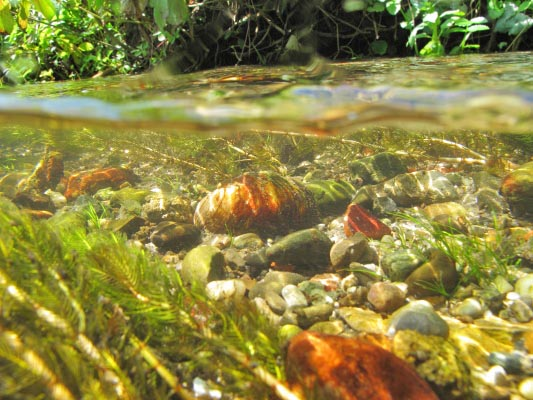
Thick shelled river mussel in its habitat

== Threats and conservation ==
During the 20th century, the thick shelled river mussel declined in Europe by as much as 50% due to deteriorating water quality, habitat fragmentation, host fish limitation, canalisation of rivers, and introduction of the muskrat (Ondatra zibethicus) to European rivers. A 2020 study identified habitat destruction, predation by muskrat, and lack of host fish as the major factors for decline. U. crassus was noted to be more tolerant of silt in the water than other threatened species.

The most stable populations are found in Russia and northern Europe.

A project in Poland successfully used artificial breeding methods including release of gravid females, release of glochidia-infested fish, and in vitro-raised juveniles, to double the population of the mussel in the Biała Tarnowska river.

Long-term conservation of the species will require changes in river management practices, controlling pollution and invasive species, restoration of river basins, and further outreach and education. More research is needed to identify priority populations for monitoring.

== Status by country ==
Its native distribution is Europe and Western Asia. It is mentioned in annexes II and IV of the European Union Habitats Directive. Globally, it is ranked endangered on the IUCN Red List. Local statuses are as follows:

- Austria – critically endangered
- Albania – vulnerable
- Belarus – vulnerable
- Belgium – strictly protected
- Bulgaria – protected
- Croatia – endangered
- Czech Republic – endangered Its conservation status in 2004-06 was unfavourable (U2) according to a report for the European Commission in accordance with the Habitats Directive.
- Denmark – believed to have been extirpated until rediscovered in Odense River in 2003. The Odense River population is estimated to number c. 3000 individuals and subsequently it has been rediscovered from Suså River where the population size is unknown (might also survive in a couple of other rivers, but this remains unconfirmed).
- Finland – in southern Finland. Vulnerable.
- France – protected
- Germany – critically endangered (vom Aussterben bedroht), strictly protected In Germany this bivalve has disappeared from 90% of its former range.
- Hungary – protected and rare
- Kazakhstan – least concern
- Latvia – vulnerable and protected
- Lithuania – sometimes reported as "extinct in the wild", but populations exist in the Neman River drainage.
- Netherlands – locally extinct. In the Netherlands it has not been seen alive after 1968 and is most likely extinct in that country.
- Poland – endangered
- Romania – endangered
- Russia – least concern
- Slovakia – vulnerable and protected
- Sweden – endangered
- Switzerland – critically endangered
