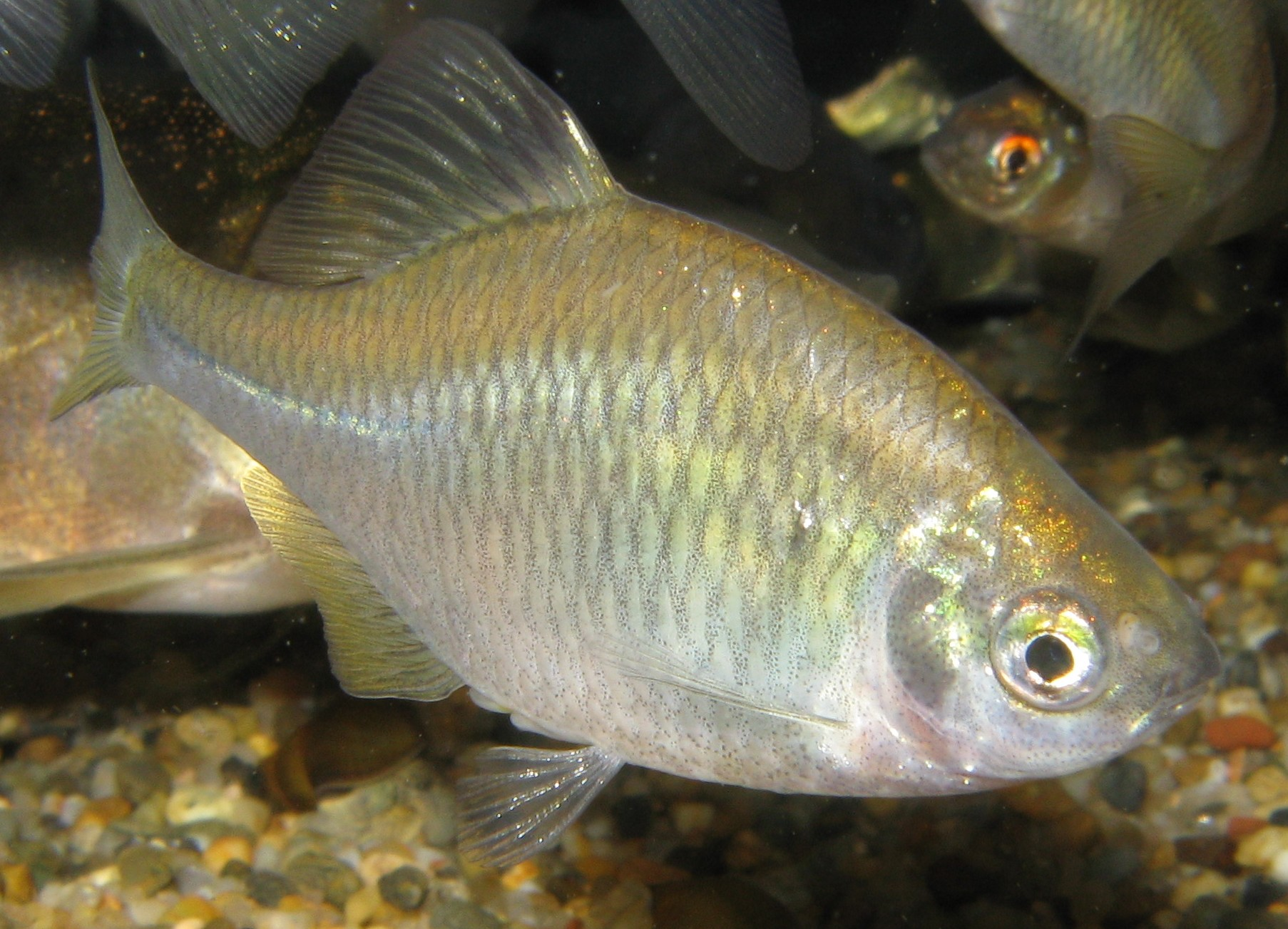

Conservation status
- Critically Endangered (IUCN 3.1)

Scientific classification
- Kingdom: Animalia
- Phylum: Chordata
- Class: Actinopterygii
- Division: Teleostei
- Order: Cypriniformes
- Suborder: Cyprinoidei
- Family: Acheilognathidae
- Genus: Rhodeus
- Species: R. smithii

Binomial name
- Rhodeus smithii (Regan, 1908)

Synonyms
- Rhodeus ocellatus kurumeus; Rhodeus kurumeus; Rhodeus ocellatus smithii; Achilognathus smithii

= Rhodeus smithii =

Species of fish

Rhodeus smithii, sometimes known as the Japanese rosy bitterling, Japanese bitterling, or Nippon baratanago is a temperate freshwater ray-finned fish belonging to the family Acheilognathidae, the bitterlings. It originates in stagnant waters in inland rivers in Japan. It was originally described as Achilognathus smithii by Charles Tate Regan in 1908, and is also referred to as Rhodeus ocellatus smithii in scientific literature.

Named in honor of British traveler, sportsman and naturalist Richard Gordon Smith (1858-1918), who collected specimens in Japan for the British Museum (Natural History).

It is listed as critically endangered in the IUCN Red List. The fish reaches a length up to 6.5 centimetres (2.6 in), and is native to freshwater habitats with a pH of 6.8 to 7.8, a hardness of 20 DH, and a temperature of 10 to 25 °C (50 to 77 °F). When spawning, the females deposit their eggs inside bivalves, where they hatch and the young remain until they can swim.

It lives about three years and rarely exceeds this lifespan.

It was widespread in the west side of Japan (Kyushu and western part of Honshū) before World War II. In 1942, the rosy bitterling was accidentally introduced with grass (Ctenopharyngodon idella) and silver carp (Hypophthalmichthys molitrix) from mainland China.

The two species are morphologically very similar, but several distinguishing characters are seen, such as the number of longitudinal scales, principal rays in the dorsal and anal fins, and shape of eggs. Also, rosy bitterling has a silvery-white area anteriorly (white lines) on the ventral fin, but R. smithii does not. In comparison, the ventral fin of R. smithii is a dark color. Another notable difference is body size. R. smithii does not commonly exceed 60 mm (2.4 in) in length, whereas rosy bitterling males are larger than 80 mm (3.1 in) and females of the species commonly exceed 60 mm (2.4 in).

== Status ==
R. smithii was widely distributed in small ponds, reservoirs, and creeks in Kyushu and the western part of Japan. However, since the rosy bitterling was introduced, their population has been increasing dramatically all over Japan. These two species coexist in many areas, and hybridization tends to occur easily.

Hybridization and subsequent gene introgression has been observed within these species in Kashima and Ogori. Because of these interbreeding events, the number of R. smithii has dramatically declined all over Japan and now is in danger of extinction. In 1994, R. smithii was on the IUCN Red List as an endangered species, and now it is critically endangered. R. smithii is also listed as a critically endangered species in the Japanese Red Data Book.

== Conservation ==
Environmental pollution, reservoir conditions, etc. have propagated the decline of native R. smithii in various places.

Since R. smithii is critically endangered, nonprofit organizations and study groups were established in Japan to help protect this subspecies.

Yao study group, one of the R. smithii conservation groups, started activities for protecting them. For example, this organization (Yao City, Osaka) made the protection pond in May 1999 where 41 male and 60 female fish were released with prawns. Also, 45 freshwater mussels were transplanted at the same time. They monitored and collected data regularly through 2001. In 2000, they succeeded in increasing the population to 6000 individuals and they transferred 500 individuals to another five ponds from the protected pond. However, in 2001, few individuals were collected. Due to the poor water quality that year compared to previous years, the study group concluded eutrophication has a negative effect on reproduction. Since then, Yao study group has considered designing new purification systems to conserve them. They also educate children (as an environmental study) for the next generation.
