= Unio gibbus =

Conservation status
- Critically Endangered (IUCN 3.1) (Europe)

Scientific classification
- Kingdom: Animalia
- Phylum: Mollusca
- Class: Bivalvia
- Order: Unionida
- Family: Unionidae
- Genus: Unio
- Species: U. gibbus

Binomial name
- Unio gibbus Spengler, 1793
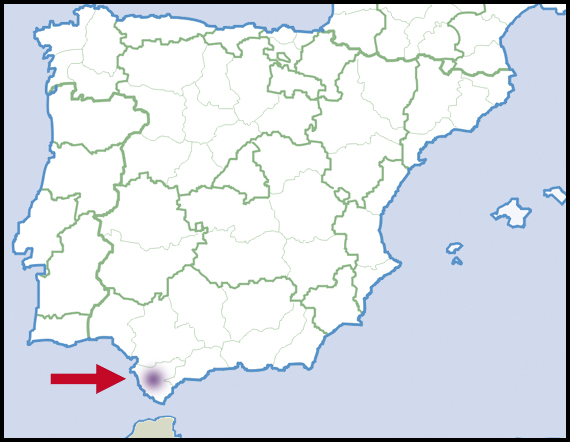
- Native range of the species in Europe

Species of bivalve

Unio gibbus is a species of bivalve belonging to the family Unionidae.

The species is found in the Iberian Peninsula and Morocco.
