= Rhodeus laoensis =

Conservation status
- Vulnerable (IUCN 3.1)

Scientific classification
- Kingdom: Animalia
- Phylum: Chordata
- Class: Actinopterygii
- Order: Cypriniformes
- Suborder: Cyprinoidei
- Family: Acheilognathidae
- Genus: Rhodeus
- Species: R. laoensis

Binomial name
- Rhodeus laoensis Kottelat, A. Doi & Musikasinthorn in Kottelat, 1998

Species of fish

Rhodeus laoensis is a tropical freshwater ray-finned fish belonging to the family Acheilognathidae, the bitterlings. It originates in Nam Theun River in the Mekong Delta in Laos. The fish reaches a length up to 4.7 cm (1.9 in). When spawning, the females deposit their eggs inside bivalves, where they hatch and the young remain until they can swim. It was discovered in 1998 along with 21 other species by Maurice Kottelat
