= Rhodeus meridionalis =

Conservation status
- Least Concern (IUCN 3.1)

Scientific classification
- Kingdom: Animalia
- Phylum: Chordata
- Class: Actinopterygii
- Order: Cypriniformes
- Suborder: Cyprinoidei
- Family: Acheilognathidae
- Genus: Rhodeus
- Species: R. meridionalis

Binomial name
- Rhodeus meridionalis S. L. Karaman, 1924

Species of fish

Rhodeus meridionalis, the Vardar bitterling, is a species of freshwater ray-finned fish in the genus Rhodeus. It is occurs in Greece and North Macedonia where it is found from the Vardar River to Pinios River.

It is most abundantly found in still or slow-flowing water having dense aquatic vegetation. The fish feeds mainly on plants and to a lesser degree on worms, crustaceans, and insect larvae.
