= Unio tumidiformis =

Conservation status
- Critically Endangered (IUCN 3.1)

Scientific classification
- Kingdom: Animalia
- Phylum: Mollusca
- Class: Bivalvia
- Order: Unionida
- Family: Unionidae
- Genus: Unio
- Species: U. tumidiformis

Binomial name
- Unio tumidiformis Castro, 1885

Synonyms
- Unio baeticus Kobelt, 1888

Species of bivalve

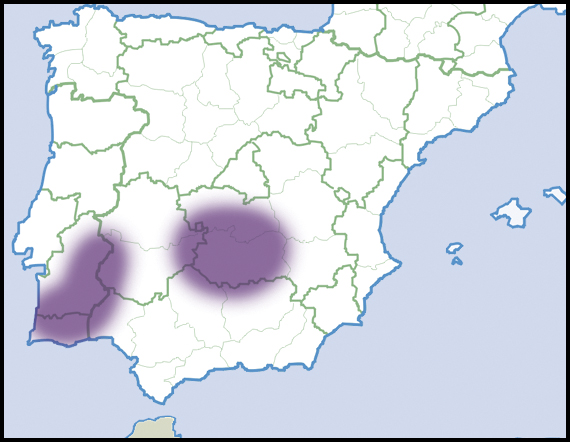
Native range of the species

Unio tumidiformis is a species of bivalve belonging to the family Unionidae. It is endemic to the southwestern Iberian Peninsula. Existing populations are known from the Guadiana, Mira, and Sado Rivers in Portugal and Spain.

Unio tumidiformis is related to Unio crassus and has been considered a "race" of the latter, but a 2009 study found the two species to be clearly distinct.

== Description ==
Unio tumidiformis grows to a shell length of 57 mm (2.2 in) and wet weight of 16 g (0.56 oz). The shell is oval in shape. In a population in southern Portugal, mussels became sexually mature at the age of 2 years. The maximum observed age was 7 years.

== Habitat ==
Unio tumidiformis occurs in temporary Mediterranean-type streams, surviving the dry season in pools that do not dry up. It is also known from some lakes (Lagunas de Ruidera in Spain). Its larvae (glochidia) seem to successfully develop only in fish of the genus Squalius (Cyprinidae).

== Conservation ==
Populations from the Guadiana and Guadalquivir River basins have already been extirpated. This species is threatened by changes of hydrologic regime of the streams, natural droughts, gravel and water extraction, dams, and impoundments. Also the loss of suitable host fish and pollution are threats.
