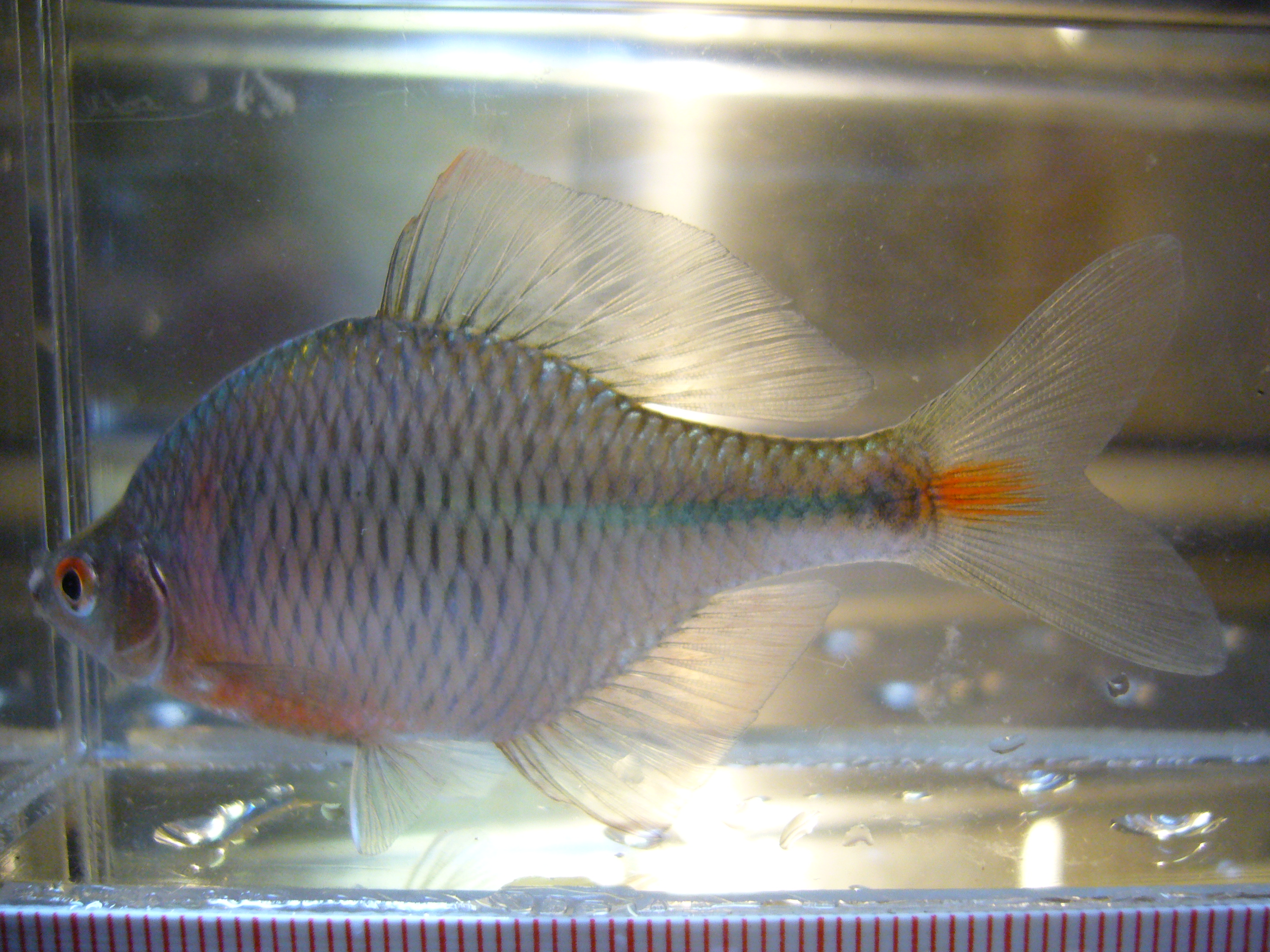

Conservation status
- Data Deficient (IUCN 3.1)

Scientific classification
- Kingdom: Animalia
- Phylum: Chordata
- Class: Actinopterygii
- Order: Cypriniformes
- Suborder: Cyprinoidei
- Family: Acheilognathidae
- Genus: Rhodeus
- Species: R. ocellatus

Binomial name
- Rhodeus ocellatus (Kner, 1866)

Synonyms
- Pseudoperilampus ocellatus Kner, 1866; Rhodeus maculatus Fowler, 1910; Rhodeus kurumeus D. S. Jordan & W. F. Thompson, 1914; Rhodeus hwanghoensis Mori, 1928; Rhodeus wangkinfui H. W. Wu, 1930; Rhodeus pingi C. P. Miao, 1934

= Rosy bitterling =

Species of fish

The rosy bitterling or Tairiku baratanago (Rhodeus ocellatus) is a small freshwater ray-finned fish belonging to the family Acheilognathidae, the bitterlings. This species occurs in East Asia from the Amur River basin to the Pearl River basin.

Females are about 4–5 cm (1.6–2.0 in) long and males are 5–8 cm (2.0–3.1 in). Their bodies are flat with an argent-colored luster. However, males change to a reddish (sometimes purple) color during the spawning season (March to September) which functions to attract females. This reddish color is similar to the color of a red rose, which is why it is called a rosy bitterling.

== Ecology and reproductive system ==
Rosy bitterlings live in ponds (reservoirs) where freshwater mussels are abundant. Farm ponds are an important habitat for not only rosy bitterlings, but also mussels and plankton. Freshwater mussels play an important role in rosy bitterling reproduction. The female rosy bitterling has a unique pipe about the same length as its own body, used for laying eggs on a specific spot of mussels. Usually, two or three eggs are laid at once and placed on the gill of the mussel. A male spawns into the gill cavity of the mussels right after a female lays eggs to ensure fertilization. Normally, a female lays eggs repeatedly at 6- to 9-day intervals about 10 times in a season.

Eggs grow in the mussels' gills and juveniles stay inside the mussel about 15 to 30 days after fertilization. Eggs hatch after about three days when juveniles are about 2.8 mm long. The body has a unique shape resembling the bud of a matsutake mushroom. Juveniles swim out of the mussel from the margin of the excurrent siphon. At this point, juveniles are about 7.5 mm long and about the same shape as adults. Usually, juveniles grow around 40–50 mm within one year, when they become adults.

This and Rhodeus smithii, sometimes called the Japanese rosy bitterling, were formerly considered conspecific. In 1942, rosy bitterling were accidentally introduced with grass (Ctenopharyngodon idella) and silver carp (Hypophthalmichthys molitrix) from mainland China. Since the rosy bitterling was introduced, their population has been increasing dramatically all over Japan. Hybridization and subsequent gene introgression has been observed within these species in Kashima and Ogori. Because of these interbreeding events, the number of R. smithii has dramatically declined all over Japan and now is in danger of extinction. In 1994, R. smithii was on the IUCN Red List as an endangered species, and now it is critically endangered.

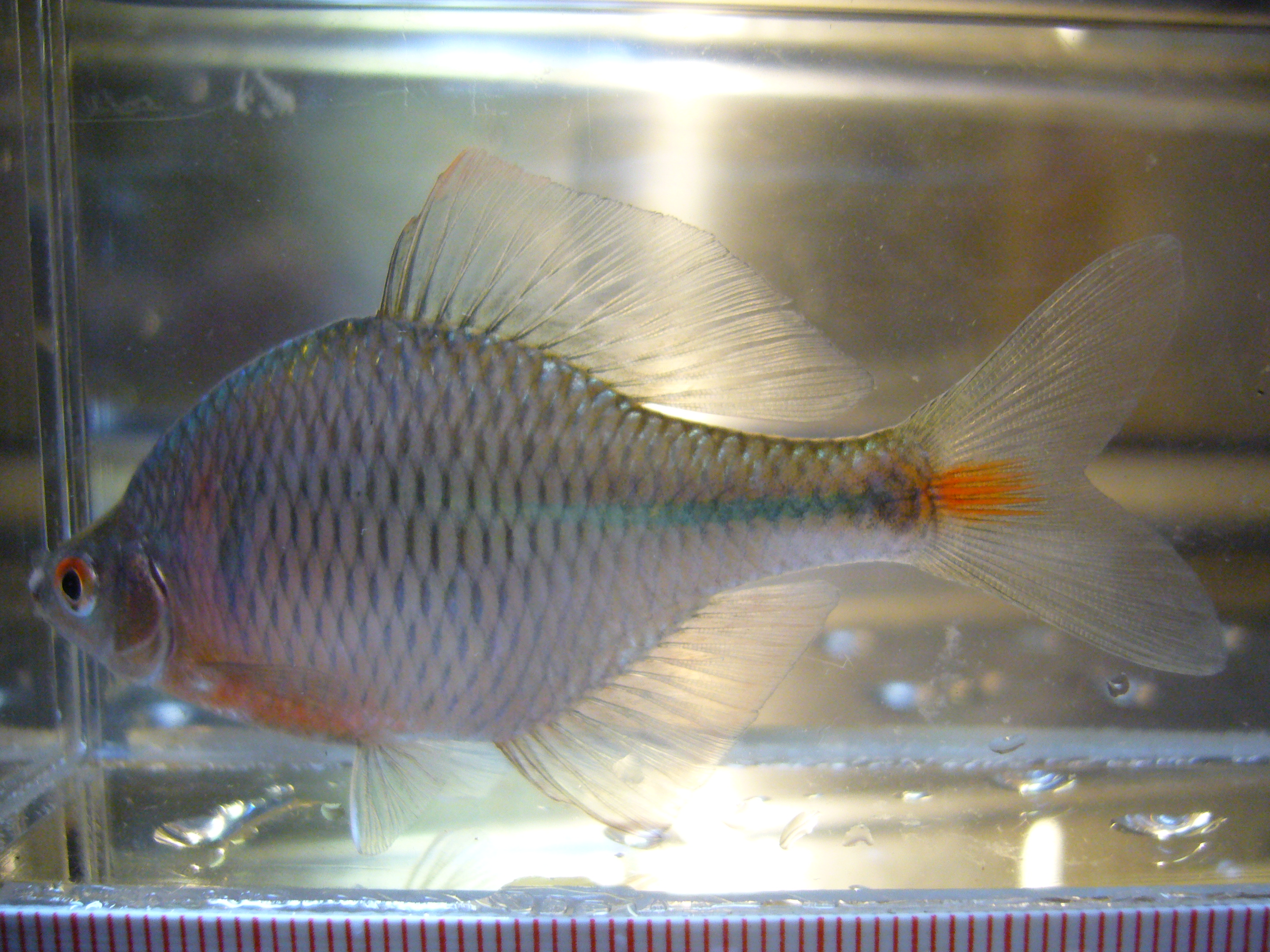
R. o. ocellatus (Tairiku baratanago sex M)

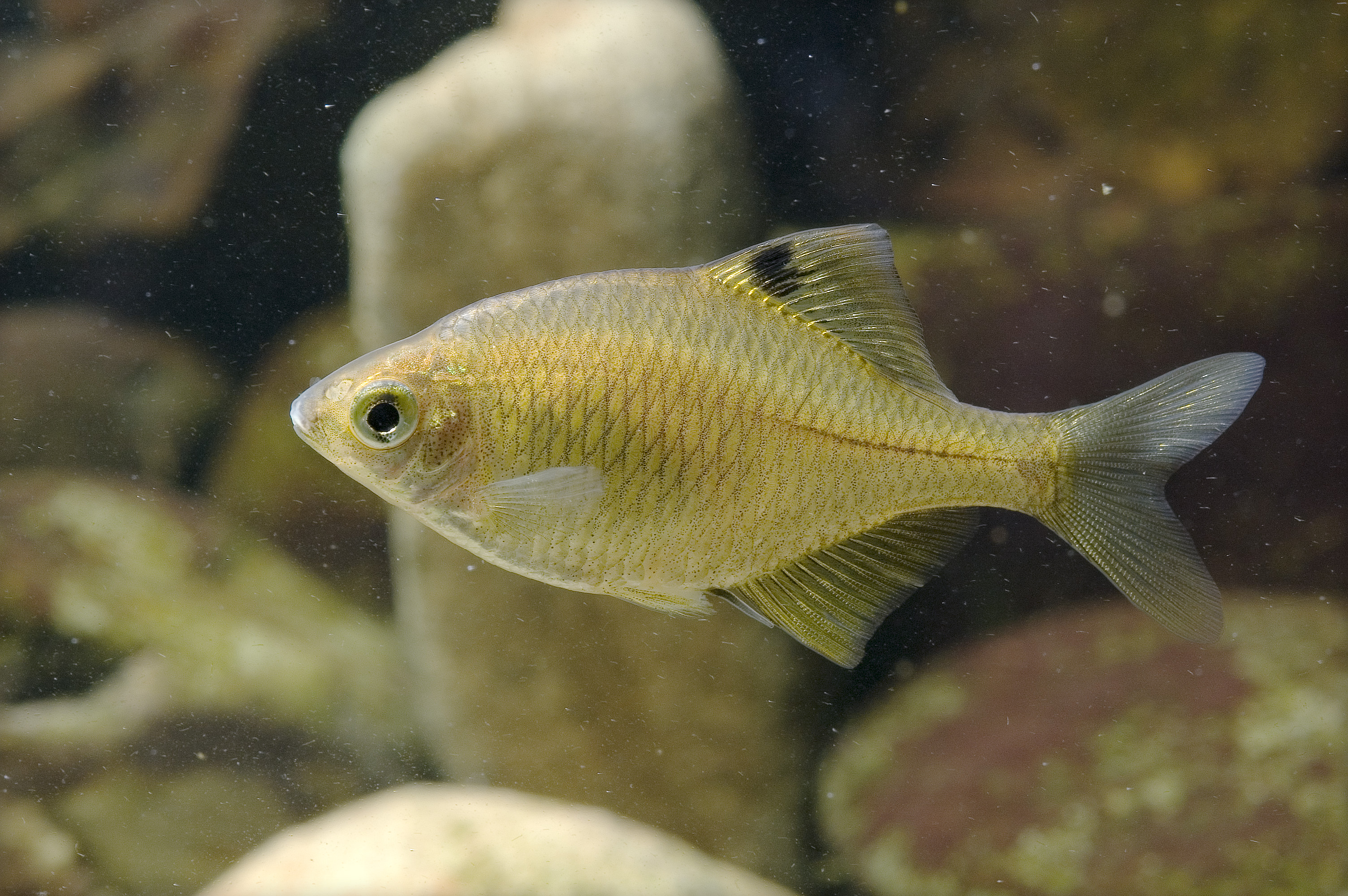
R. o. ocellatus (Tairiku baratanago sex F)
