= Rhodeus pseudosericeus =

Conservation status
- Vulnerable (IUCN 3.1)

Scientific classification
- Kingdom: Animalia
- Phylum: Chordata
- Class: Actinopterygii
- Order: Cypriniformes
- Suborder: Cyprinoidei
- Family: Acheilognathidae
- Genus: Rhodeus
- Species: R. pseudosericeus

Binomial name
- Rhodeus pseudosericeus R. Arai, S. R. Jeon & Ueda, 2001

Species of fish

Rhodeus pseudosericeus, the Hangang bitterling, is a temperate freshwater ray-finned fish belonging to the family Acheilognathidae, the bitterlings. It originated in the Namhan River system in the Gyeonggi-do and Gangwon-do provinces of Korea. It was originally described as Acanthorhodeus atremius by Jordan & Thompson in 1914. The fish reaches a length up to 6.1 cm (2.4 in). When spawning, the females deposit their eggs inside bivalves, where they hatch and the young remain until they can swim.
