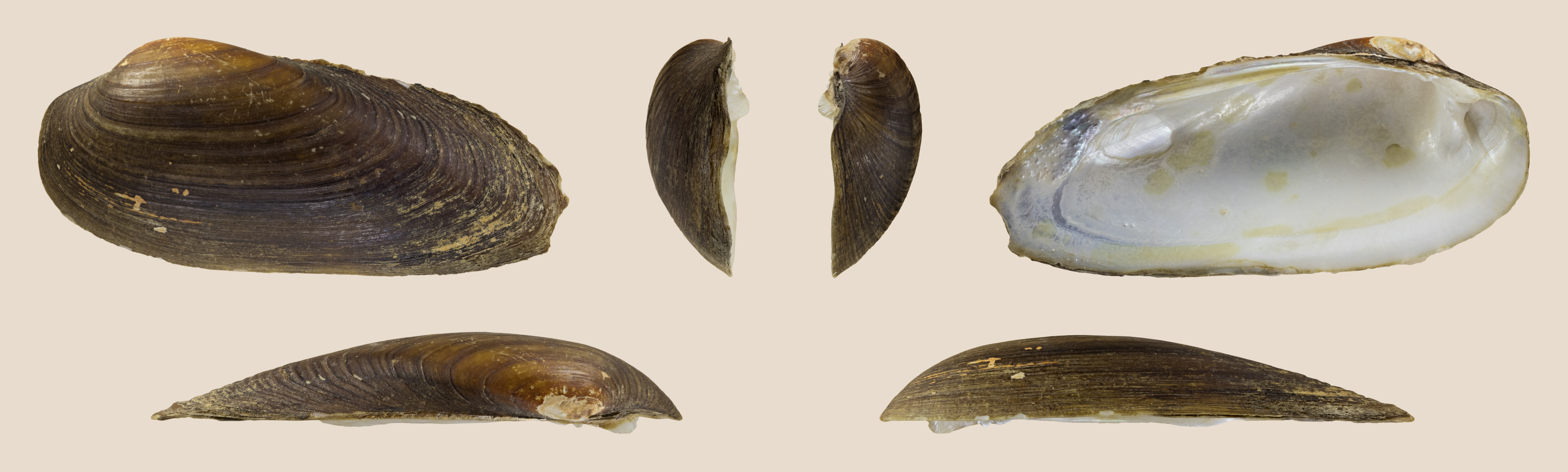
- Left valve of a brown shell

Conservation status
- Least Concern (IUCN 3.1)

Scientific classification
- Kingdom: Animalia
- Phylum: Mollusca
- Class: Bivalvia
- Order: Unionida
- Family: Unionidae
- Genus: Unio
- Species: U. pictorum

Binomial name
- Unio pictorum (Linnaeus, 1758)
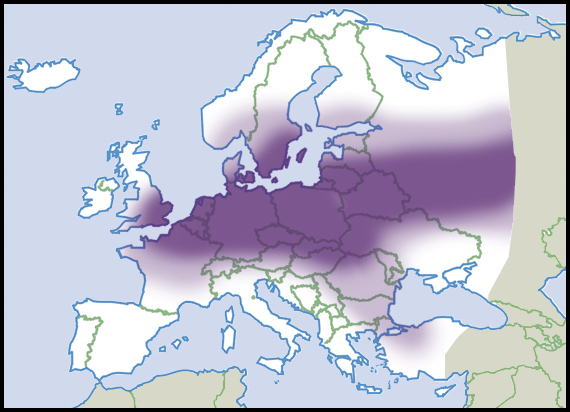
- Distribution of Unio pictorum in Europe.

= Unio pictorum =

Painter's mussel

Species of bivalve

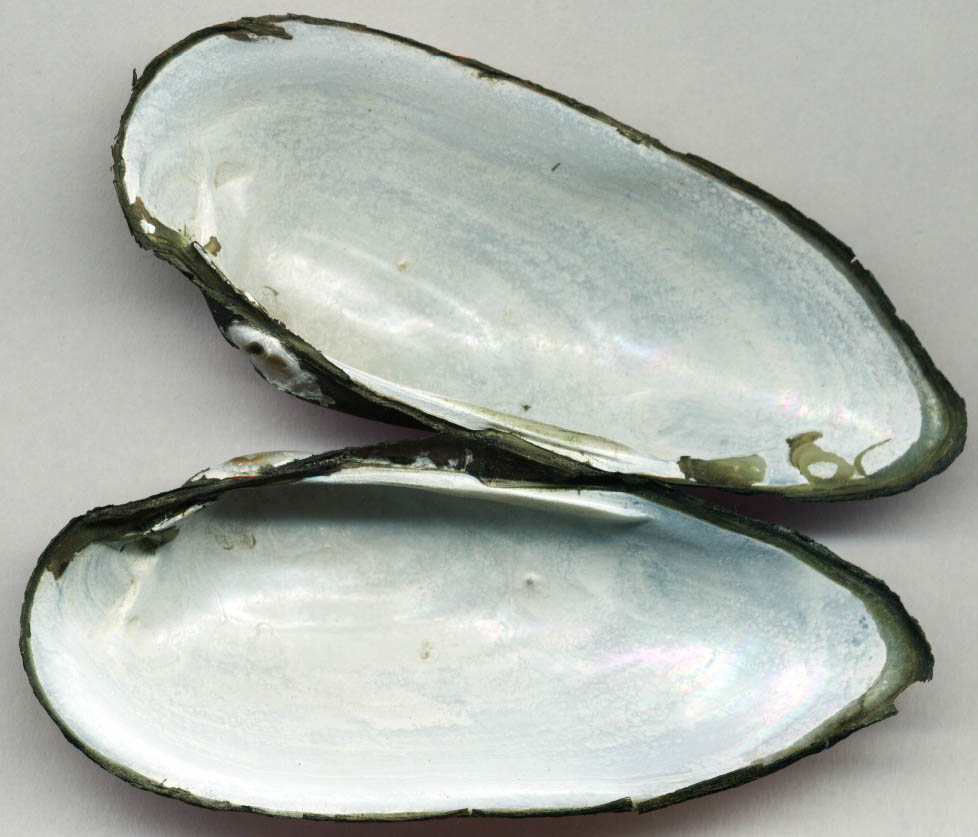
Internal view of both valves

Unio pictorum is moving on the muddy bottom of a freshwater lake. Russia, the Southern Urals.

Unio pictorum, the painter's mussel, is a species of medium-sized freshwater mussel, an aquatic bivalve mollusk in the family Unionidae, the river mussels.

This species lives in Europe. It is called the "painter's mussel" because the shell was historically used as a conveniently sized and shaped receptacle for holding artist's paint.

Subspecies

- † Unio pictorum alexeevi Mangikian, 1929
- † Unio pictorum pseudorumanus Chepalyga, 1967
- † Unio pictorum rumanoides Chepalyga, 1967

== Synonyms ==
- Limnium pictorum(Linnaeus, 1758) ·
- Lymnium pictorum (Linnaeus, 1758) ·
- Mya nodosa Gmelin, 1791 (a junior synonym)
- Mya ovalis Philipsson, 1788 (a junior synonym)
- Mya pictorum Linnaeus, 1758 (original combination)
- Unio (Unio) kalmykorum Bogachev, 1924 (junior subjective synonym)
- Unio (Unio) limosus Nilsson, 1822 (a junior synonym)
- Unio (Unio) pictorum (Linnaeus, 1758) ·
- Unio (Unio) protractus Lindholm, 1932 (junior subjective synonym)
- Unio (Unio) rostrata Lamarck, 1819 (a junior synonym)
- Unio annulatus Kobelt, 1911 (a junior synonym)
- Unio ascanius Kobelt, 1912 (junior synonym)
- Unio deshayesii Michaud, 1831 (a junior synonym)
- Unio gaudioni Drouët, 1881 (junior synonym)
- Unio gentilis F. Haas, 1911junior subjective synonym
- Unio inflatus Studer, 1820 (a junior synonym)
- Unio kalmykorum Bogachev, 1924 (a junior synonym)
- Unio latirostris Küster, 1853 (a junior synonym)
- Unio limosus Nilsson, 1822 (a junior synonym)
- Unio limosus behningi Starobogatov & Pirogov, 1970 (a junior synonym)
- Unio lindholmi Zhadin, 1938 (a junior synonym)
- Unio longirostris Rossmässler, 1836 ·
- Unio longirostris schrenckianus Clessin, 1880 (a junior synonym)
- Unio maltzani Küster, 1854 (a junior synonym)
- Unio pictorum okensis Zhadin, 1938 (a junior synonym)
- Unio pictorum var. grandis Rossmässler, 1842 (a junior synonym)
- Unio pictorum var. okae Kobelt, 1911 (invalid; junior homonym of Unio...)
- Unio pictorum var. okensis Zhadin, 1938 (junior synonym)
- Unio pictorum var. pachyodon H. Jordan, 1879 junior subjective synonym
- Unio pictorum var. pygmaeus Zhadin, 1938 (a junior synonym)
- Unio pictorum var. tumens de Joannis, 1859 (a junior synonym)
- Unio pictorum var. vinceleus de Joannis, 1859 (a junior synonym)
- Unio platyrhynchus Rossmässler, 1835 (a junior synonym)
- Unio ponderosus Rossmässler, 1842 (a junior synonym)
- Unio praeposterus Küster, 1853 (a junior synonym)
- Unio protractus Lindholm, 1932 ·
- † Unio protractus subpictorum Lindholm, 1932 (subjective synonym)
- Unio quinqueannulatus Küster, 1854 (junior synonym)
- Unio rostrata Lamarck, 1819 ·
- Unio rostratus Lamarck, 1819 (wrong gender agreement)
- Unio schrenkianus Clessin, 1880 (a junior synonym)
- Unio voltzii Kobelt, 1911 (invalid; not Koch & Dunker, 1837)

== Distribution ==
The native distribution of this species is Europe and Siberia (Russia).

- Croatia
- Czech Republic - in Bohemia, in Moravia, least concern (LC); Czech code, Decree for implementation, No. 395/1992 Sb. (and No. 175/2006 Sb.) - Critically Threatened species.
- Slovakia - not in red lists
- Estonia – frequent.
- Germany
  - endangered (gefährdet)
  - Listed as specially protected species in annex 1 in Bundesartenschutzverordnung.
- Netherlands - Common (algemeen)
- Serbia
- Russia
- Sweden - not so common, scattered occurrence
- British Isles - mostly in England

Biotope: water bodies and slower streams.
