= Rhodeus albomarginatus =

Conservation status
- Vulnerable (IUCN 3.1)

Scientific classification
- Kingdom: Animalia
- Phylum: Chordata
- Class: Actinopterygii
- Order: Cypriniformes
- Family: Acheilognathidae
- Genus: Rhodeus
- Species: R. albomarginatus

Binomial name
- Rhodeus albomarginatus F. Li & Arai, 2014

Species of fish

Rhodeus albomarginatus is a species of freshwater ray-finned fish in the genus Rhodeus, a bitterling. It is endemic to China, where it is found in the Lvjiang River of the Yangtze River drainage and uses the freshwater mussel Ptychorhynchus murinum as its host for spawning.
