= Rhodeus haradai =

Conservation status
- Endangered (IUCN 3.1)

Scientific classification
- Kingdom: Animalia
- Phylum: Chordata
- Class: Actinopterygii
- Order: Cypriniformes
- Suborder: Cyprinoidei
- Family: Acheilognathidae
- Genus: Rhodeus
- Species: R. haradai

Binomial name
- Rhodeus haradai R. Arai, N. Suzuki & S. C. Shen, 1990

Species of fish

Rhodeus haradai is a subtropical freshwater ray-finned fish belonging to the family Acheilognathidae, the bitterlings. It originates in the Hainan province of China. When spawning, the females deposit their eggs inside bivalves, where they hatch and the young remain until they can swim.

Named in honor of I. Harada, ichthyologist who reported this new species as R. spinalis in 1943.
