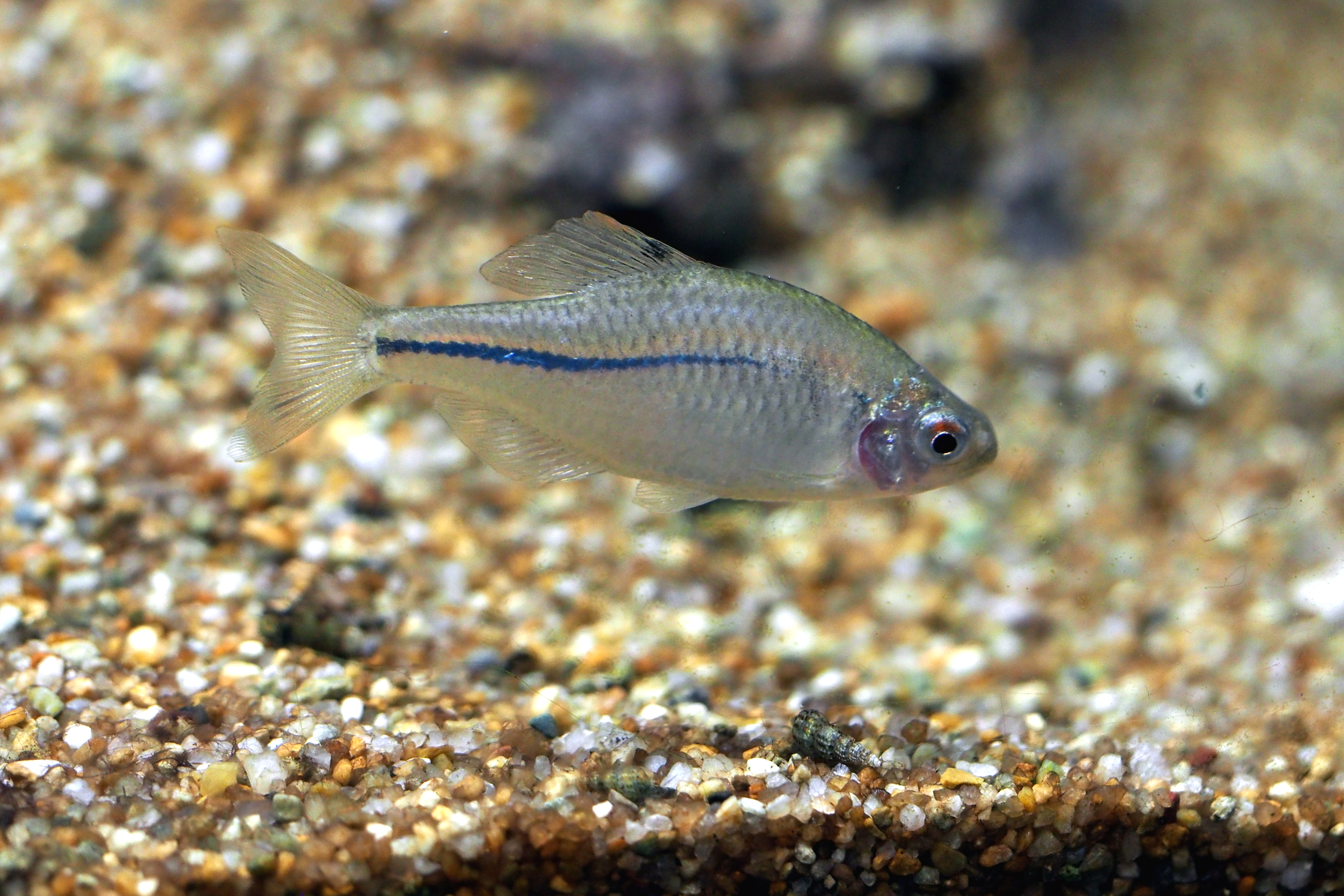

Conservation status
- Least Concern (IUCN 3.1)

Scientific classification
- Kingdom: Animalia
- Phylum: Chordata
- Class: Actinopterygii
- Order: Cypriniformes
- Suborder: Cyprinoidei
- Family: Acheilognathidae
- Genus: Rhodeus
- Species: R. sinensis

Binomial name
- Rhodeus sinensis Günther, 1868

= Rhodeus sinensis =

Species of fish

Rhodeus sinensis is a subtropical freshwater ray-finned fish belonging to the family Acheilognathidae, the bitterlings. It originated in inland rivers in China, and has been introduced as an exotic species in Afghanistan. The fish reaches a length up to 5.2 cm (2.0 in), and is native to freshwater habitats with a pH of 6.8 to 7.8, a hardness of 20 DH, and a temperature of 10 to 25 °C (50 to 77 °F). When spawning, the females deposit their eggs inside bivalves, where they hatch and the young remain until they can swim.
