= Rhodeus nigrodorsalis =

Conservation status
- Vulnerable (IUCN 3.1)

Scientific classification
- Kingdom: Animalia
- Phylum: Chordata
- Class: Actinopterygii
- Order: Cypriniformes
- Family: Acheilognathidae
- Genus: Rhodeus
- Species: R. nigrodorsalis

Binomial name
- Rhodeus nigrodorsalis Li, Liao & Arai, 2020

Species of fish

Rhodeus nigrodorsalis is a species of freshwater ray-finned fish belonging to the family Acheilognathidae, the bitterlings. The species is only known in China. The fish spawns primarily during January to March.
