= Rhodeus fangi =

Conservation status
- Least Concern (IUCN 3.1)

Scientific classification
- Kingdom: Animalia
- Phylum: Chordata
- Class: Actinopterygii
- Order: Cypriniformes
- Suborder: Cyprinoidei
- Family: Acheilognathidae
- Genus: Rhodeus
- Species: R. fangi

Binomial name
- Rhodeus fangi (Miao, 1934)

Synonyms
- Pararhodeus fangi C. P. Miao, 1934

Species of fish

Rhodeus fangi is a subtropical freshwater ray-finned fish belonging to the family Acheilognathidae, the bitterlings. It originates in the Pearl River, Yangtze River in China. It was originally described as Pararhodeus fangi by C.P. Miao in 1934.

== Etymology ==
Named in honor of ichthyologist Fang Ping-Wen (sometimes transcribed as Bingwen, 1903–1944), Metropolitan Museum of Natural History, Academia Sinica (spelled "Sinerica" by Miao), Nanjing, China.

When spawning, the females deposit their eggs inside bivalves, where they hatch and the young remain until they can swim.
