= Rhodeus sciosemus =

Scientific classification
- Kingdom: Animalia
- Phylum: Chordata
- Class: Actinopterygii
- Order: Cypriniformes
- Suborder: Cyprinoidei
- Family: Acheilognathidae
- Genus: Rhodeus
- Species: R. sciosemus

Binomial name
- Rhodeus sciosemus (D. S. Jordan & W. F. Thompson, 1914)

Synonyms
- Acanthorhodeus sciosemus Jordan & Thompson, 1914

Species of fish

Rhodeus sciosemus is a subtropical freshwater ray-finned fish belonging to the family Acheilognathidae, the bitterlings. It originates in inland rivers in Japan. It was originally described as Acanthorhodeus sciosemus by Jordan & Thompson in 1914. When spawning, the females deposit their eggs inside bivalves, where they hatch and the young remain until they can swim.
