= Rhodeus kyphus =

Conservation status
- Data Deficient (IUCN 3.1)

Scientific classification
- Kingdom: Animalia
- Phylum: Chordata
- Class: Actinopterygii
- Division: Teleostei
- Order: Cypriniformes
- Suborder: Cyprinoidei
- Family: Acheilognathidae
- Genus: Rhodeus
- Species: R. kyphus

Binomial name
- Rhodeus kyphus (Đ. Y. Mai, 1978)

Synonyms
- Pararhodeus kyphus Mai, 1978; Acheilognathus kyphus (Mai, 1978)

Species of fish

Rhodeus kyphus is a species of freshwater ray-finned fish in the genus Rhodeus, a bitterling. It is found in eastern Asia; inhabiting Thailand and northern Vietnam. However, due to a general lack of knowledge, IUCN has classified the fish as being data deficient. In Czech, Rhodeus kyphus is known as "Hořavka thajská", meaning Thai bitterling.
