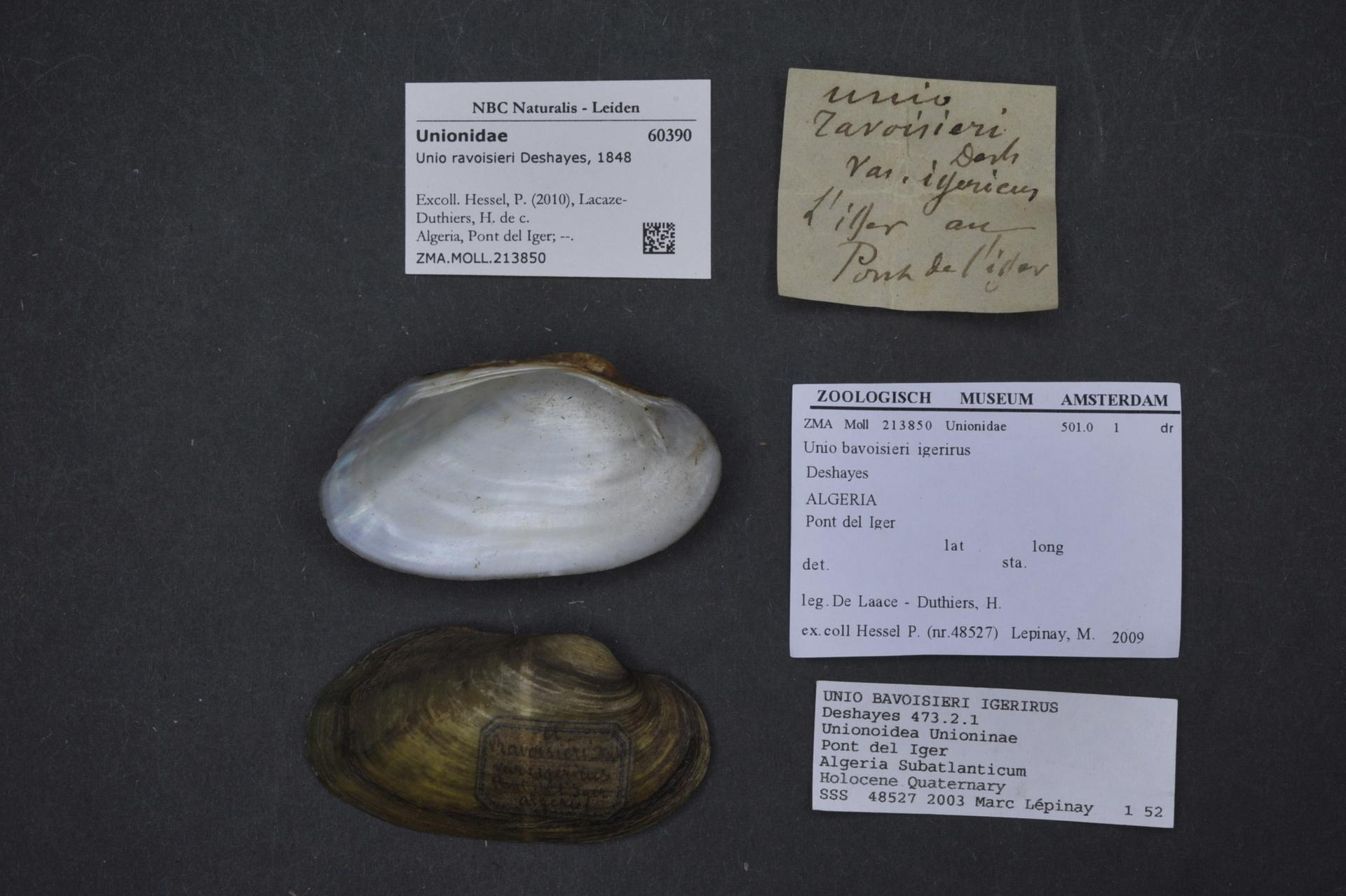

Scientific classification
- Kingdom: Animalia
- Phylum: Mollusca
- Class: Bivalvia
- Order: Unionida
- Family: Unionidae
- Genus: Unio
- Species: U. ravoisieri

Binomial name
- Unio ravoisieri Deshayes, 1848

= Unio ravoisieri =

Species of bivalve

Unio ravoisieri is a species of bivalve belonging to the family Unionidae. It is endemic to North Africa, including at least Algeria and Tunisia. It occurs in rivers and is often found in shallow rivers on gravel and silt bottoms.

Unio ravoisieri grows to a shell length of at least 10 cm (4 in).
