= Rhodeus spinalis =

Conservation status
- Least Concern (IUCN 3.1)

Scientific classification
- Kingdom: Animalia
- Phylum: Chordata
- Class: Actinopterygii
- Order: Cypriniformes
- Suborder: Cyprinoidei
- Family: Acheilognathidae
- Genus: Rhodeus
- Species: R. spinalis

Binomial name
- Rhodeus spinalis Ōshima, 1926

Synonyms
- Pseudoperilampus hainanensis Nichols & Pope, 1927; Rhodeus ocellatus vietnamensis Đ. Y. Mai, 1978; Rhodeus vietnamensis Mai, 1978

Species of fish

Rhodeus spinalis is a subtropical freshwater and brackish water ray-finned fish belonging to the family Acheilognathidae, the bitterlings. It originates on Hainan Island and the Xijiang River basin in China, and may be native to portions of Vietnam. The fish reaches a length up to 10.0 cm (3.9 in). When spawning, the females deposit their eggs inside bivalves, where they hatch and the young remain until they can swim.
