= Georgian bitterling =

Conservation status
- Least Concern (IUCN 3.1)

Scientific classification
- Kingdom: Animalia
- Phylum: Chordata
- Class: Actinopterygii
- Order: Cypriniformes
- Suborder: Cyprinoidei
- Family: Acheilognathidae
- Genus: Rhodeus
- Species: R. colchicus

Binomial name
- Rhodeus colchicus Bogutskaya & Komlev, 2001

Species of fish

The Georgian bitterling (Rhodeus colchicus) is a temperate freshwater ray-finned fish belonging to the family Acheilognathidae, the bitterlings. It originates in the western portion of the Transcaucasia region of Georgia. It was originally described by Nina Gidalevna Bogutskaya and Alexey Mikhailovich Komlev in 2001. It reaches a maximum size of 6.8 cm (2.7 in).
