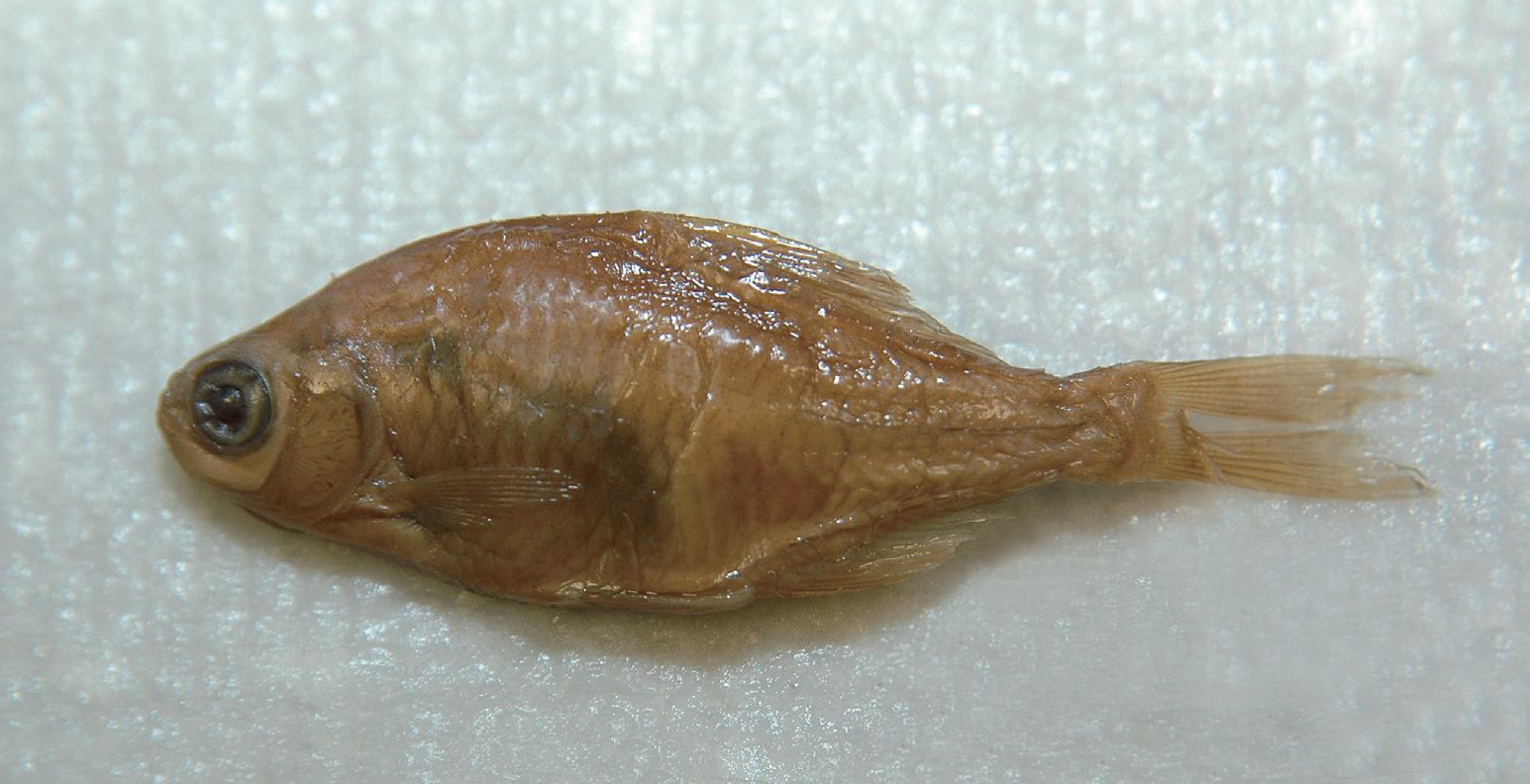

Scientific classification
- Domain: Eukaryota
- Kingdom: Animalia
- Phylum: Chordata
- Class: Actinopterygii
- Order: Cypriniformes
- Suborder: Cyprinoidei
- Family: Acheilognathidae
- Genus: Rhodeus
- Species: R. hondae

Binomial name
- Rhodeus hondae (D. S. Jordan & Metz, 1913)

Synonyms
- Pseudoperilampus hondae Jordan & Metz, 1913; Acheilognathus hondae (Jordan & Metz, 1913)

= Rhodeus hondae =

Species of fish

Rhodeus hondae also known as Seoho bitterling (Korean: 서호납줄갱이; Hanja: 西湖납줄갱이; RR: seohonapjulgaengi; lit. Western lake bitterling) is a species of freshwater ray-finned fish in the genus Rhodeus. It is endemic to South Korea.

Named in honor of K. Honda, director, Agricultural Station at Suigen (Korea), "who obtained for us a fine collection from the pond at this station". Following this single specimen, two further specimens were collected in the same place in 1935 by T. Mori. As no further specimens have been collected since, it is now considered extinct.
