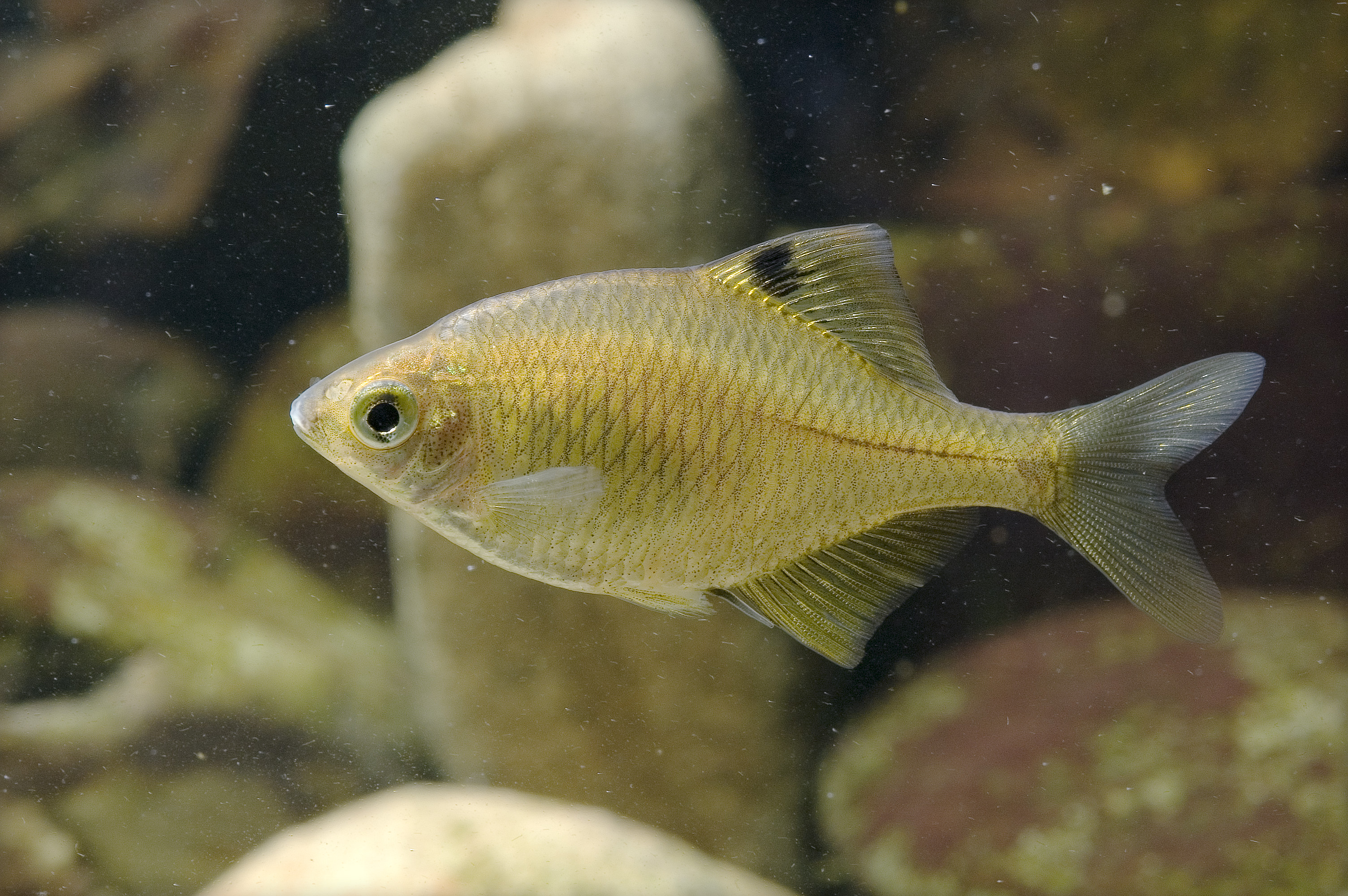
- Rosy bitterling (R. ocellatus)

Scientific classification
- Kingdom: Animalia
- Phylum: Chordata
- Class: Actinopterygii
- Division: Teleostei
- Order: Cypriniformes
- Family: Acheilognathidae
- Genus: Rhodeus; Agassiz, 1832

Type species
- Cyprinus amarus Bloch, 1782

= Rhodeus =

Genus of fishes

Rhodeus is a genus of freshwater ray-finned fishes belonging to the family Acheilognathidae, the bitterlings. The scientific name is derived from the Greek word rhodeos, meaning "rose". Most species in the genus are restricted to Asia, but two species are found in Europe (R. amarus and R. meridionalis).

Bitterlings are short-lived species, generally surviving only about five years. Their maximum size is 11 cm, but they are usually much shorter. Bitterlings inhabit slow-flowing or still waters, such as ponds, lakes, marshes, muddy and sandy pools, and river backwaters. Because they depend on freshwater mussels to reproduce, their range is restricted. Bitterlings are omnivorous, feeding on both invertebrates and plants.

Bitterlings have a remarkable reproduction strategy where parents transfer responsibility for the care of their young to various species of freshwater mussels (Unionidae and Margaritiferidae). The female extends her long ovipositor into the mantle cavity of the mussel and deposits her eggs between the gill filaments. The male then ejects his sperm into the mussel's inhalent water current and fertilization takes place within the gills of the host. The same female may use a number of mussels, and she deposits only one or two yellow, oval eggs into each. Early developmental stages are protected from predation within the body of the mussel. After 3 to 4 weeks, larvae swim away from the hosts to continue life on their own.

In 1936, the bitterling was thought to respond to hormones in a pregnant woman's urine, but the work was later discredited.

== Species ==
This genus and Acheilognathus have a convoluted taxonomic history, one being at times included in the other. They are now considered separate, but some species formerly in Rhodeus are now in Acheilognathus.

These are the currently recognized species in this genus:

- Rhodeus albomarginatus F. Li & Arai, 2014
- Rhodeus amarus (Bloch, 1782) (European bitterling)
- Rhodeus amurensis Vronsky, 1967
- Rhodeus atremius (D. S. Jordan & W. F. Thompson, 1914) (Kyushu bitterling)
- Rhodeus caspius Esmaeili, Sayyadzadeh, Japoshvili, Eagderi, Abbasi & Mousavi-Sabet, 2020
- Rhodeus colchicus Bogutskaya & Komlev, 2001 (Georgian bitterling)
- Rhodeus cyanorostris F. Li, T.-Y. Liao & Arai, 2020
- Rhodeus elongatus (Mai, 1978)
- Rhodeus fangi (Miao, 1934)
- Rhodeus flaviventris F. Li, Arai & T.-Y.Liao, 2020
- Rhodeus haradai Arai, N. Suzuki & S. C. Shen, 1990
- Rhodeus hondae (D. S. Jordan & Metz, 1913)
- Rhodeus kyphus (Mai, 1978)
- Rhodeus laoensis Kottelat, A. Doi & Musikasinthorn, 1998
- Rhodeus lighti (H. W. Wu, 1931) (Light's bitterling)
- Rhodeus mantschuricus T. Mori, 1934 (Amur bitterling)
- Rhodeus meridionalis S. L. Karaman, 1924 (Vardar bitterling)
- Rhodeus monguonensis G. L. Li, 1989
- Rhodeus nigrodorsalis Li, Liao & Arai, 2020
- Rhodeus notatus Nichols, 1929
- Rhodeus ocellatus (Kner, 1866) (Rosy bitterling)
- Rhodeus pseudosericeus Arai, S. R. Jeon & Ueda, 2001
- Rhodeus rheinardti (Tirant, 1883)
- Rhodeus sciosemus (D.S. Jordan & W. F. Thompson, 1914)
- Rhodeus sericeus (Pallas, 1776) (Amur bitterling)
- Rhodeus shitaiensis F. Li & Arai, 2011
- Rhodeus sinensis Günther, 1868
- Rhodeus smithii (Regan, 1908)
- Rhodeus spinalis Ōshima, 1926
- Rhodeus suigensis T. Mori, 1935
- Rhodeus tugbae Kalaycı, Kurtul, Bayçelebi, Kaya & Turan, 2025
- Rhodeus uyekii T. Mori, 1935
