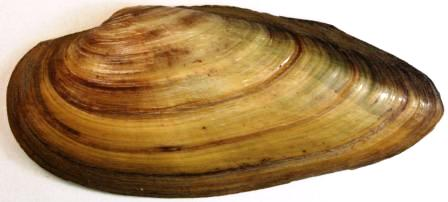
- A shell of Unio pictorum (Painter's mussel), anterior end towards the left

Scientific classification
- Kingdom: Animalia
- Phylum: Mollusca
- Class: Bivalvia
- Order: Unionida
- Family: Unionidae
- Subfamily: Unioninae
- Tribe: Unionini
- Genus: Unio; Philipsson, 1788

Species
- See text

Synonyms
- Batavusiana Bourguignat, 1889 (superseded rank); Batavusiana (Crassunio) Modell, 1964 (a junior synonym); Cafferia C. T. Simpson, 1900 junior subjective synonym; Consentunio Jatsko, 1972 (junior subjective synonym); Crassiana Servain, 1882 junior subjective synonym; Crassunio Modell, 1964 (junior objective synonym); Eolymnium Prashad, 1919 junior subjective synonym; Eolymnium (Shadininaia) Starobogatov, 1983 (a junior synonym); Limnium (incorrect subsequent spelling of Lymnium); Lymnium Moquin-Tandon, 1856; Margarita (Unio) Philipsson, 1788 (reversed priority of genus-group names); Margaron (Unio) Philipsson, 1788 (reversed priority of genus-group names); Mysca W. Turton, 1822 junior subjective synonym; Nemrodia Pallary, 1939 (unavailable; the name published without designating a type species); † Ningxiaconcha Q.-H. Ma, 1991 junior subjective synonym; Nodularia (Cafferia) C. T. Simpson, 1900 superseded combination; Pictunio Jatsko, 1972 (junior objective synonym of Unio); Unio (Bataviana) Servain, 1882 (a junior synonym); Unio (Batavusiana) Bourguignat, 1889 (a junior synonym); Unio (Cafferia) C. T. Simpson, 1900 superseded combination; Unio (Consentunio) Jatsko, 1972 (junior subjective synonym); Unio (Crassiana) Servain, 1882 junior subjective synonym; Unio (Crassunio) Modell, 1964 (junior objective synonym); Unio (Eolymnium) Prashad, 1919 junior subjective synonym; Unio (Limnium) [sic] (incorrect subsequent spelling of Lymnium; synonym); Unio (Lymnium) Moquin-Tandon, 1856; Unio (Nemrodia) Pallary, 1939 (original rank); Unio (Tumidunio) Jatsko, 1972; Unio (Tumidusiana) Locard, 1889; Unio (Unio) Philipsson, 1788; Unionea Rafinesque, 1815 (unnecessary substitute name or unjustified emendation of Unio); Unis F. W. Hutton, 1883 (orthographic variant)

= Unio (bivalve) =

Unio Temporal range: Late Jurassic–Recent

Genus of bivalves

Unio is a genus of medium-sized freshwater mussels, aquatic bivalve mollusks in the family Unionidae, the river mussels. They are found throughout Europe, Africa, and the Middle East, with some species introduced to East Asia. Fossil species are also known from the Jurassic of North America.

Unio is the type genus of the family Unionidae.

== Species ==
Species in the genus Unio include:

- Unio abyssinicus Martens, 1866
- Unio bruguierianus Bourguignat, 1853
- Unio caffer Krauss, 1848
- Unio cariei – extinct (no longer recognised)
- Unio courtillieri Hattemann, 1859
- Unio crassus Philipsson, 1788 (Thick shelled river mussel) - near threatened
- Unio damascensis Lea, 1863
- Unio delicatus Lea, 1863
- Unio delphinus Spengler, 1793
- Unio dembeae Reeve, 1865
- Unio durieui Deshayes, 1847
- Unio elongatulus C. Pfeiffer, 1825
- Unio eucirrus Bourguignat, 1857
- Unio foucauldianus Pallary, 1936
- Unio gibbus Spengler, 1793
- Unio hueti Bourguignat, 1855
- Unio ionicus Drouët, 1879
- Unio mancus Lamarck, 1819
- Unio meridionalis Drouët, 1883
- Unio pictorum (Linnaeus, 1758) (Painter's mussel)
- Unio ravoisieri Deshayes, 1848
- Unio sesirmensis Kobelt, 1913
- Unio terminalis Bourguignat, 1852
- Unio tigridis Bourguignat, 1852
- Unio tumidiformis Castro, 1885
- Unio tumidus Philipsson, 1788 (Swollen river mussel)
- Unio turtoni (=Unio mancus)
