= Unio turtoni =

Conservation status
- Data Deficient (IUCN 2.3)

Scientific classification
- Kingdom: Animalia
- Phylum: Mollusca
- Class: Bivalvia
- Order: Unionida
- Family: Unionidae
- Genus: Unio
- Species: U. turtoni

Binomial name
- Unio turtoni B.C. Payraudeau, 1826

Species of bivalve

Unio turtoni is a species of medium-sized freshwater mussel, an aquatic bivalve mollusk in the family Unionidae, the river mussels.

The species is endemic to France and eastern Spain and is rarely found.
