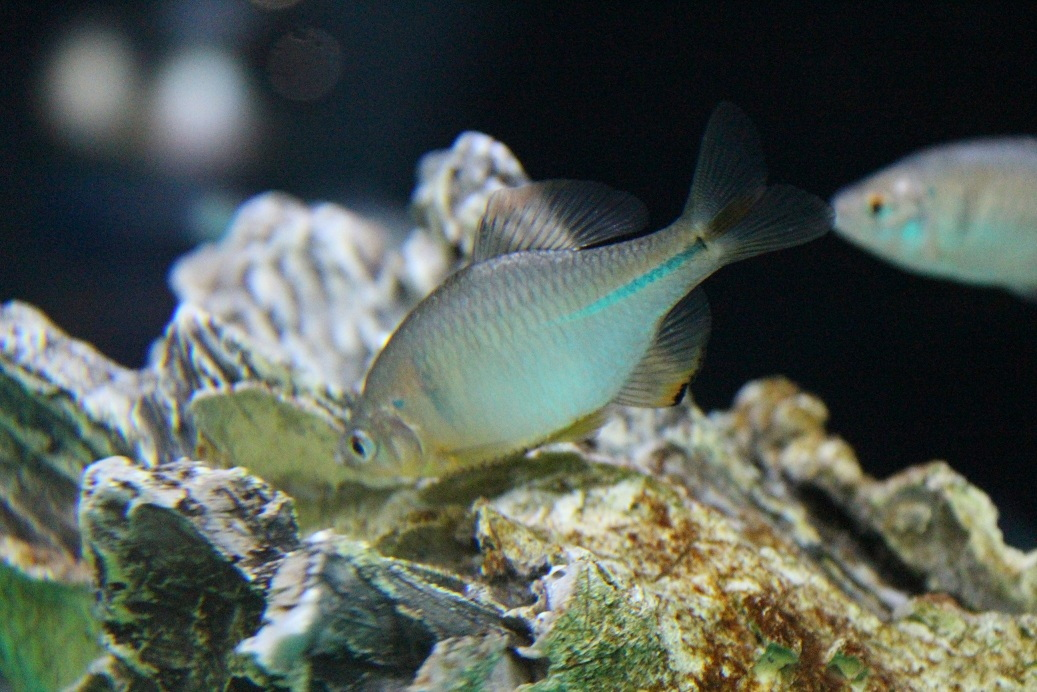
- Korean rose bitterling

Conservation status
- Least Concern (IUCN 3.1)

Scientific classification
- Kingdom: Animalia
- Phylum: Chordata
- Class: Actinopterygii
- Order: Cypriniformes
- Suborder: Cyprinoidei
- Family: Acheilognathidae
- Genus: Rhodeus
- Species: R. uyekii

Binomial name
- Rhodeus uyekii (T. Mori, 1935)

Synonyms
- Pseudoperilampus uyekii Mori, 1935

= Rhodeus uyekii =

Species of fish

Rhodeus uyekii, or gag-si-bung-eo, is a temperate freshwater ray-finned fish belonging to the family Acheilognathidae, the bitterlings. It originates in inland rivers in South Korea. It was originally described as Pseudoperilampus uyekii by T. Mori in 1935.

Named in honor of Homiki Uyeki (1882-1976), botanist, Suigen Agricultural College (type locality is in Suigen, Korea).

The fish reaches a length up to 6.0 cm (2.4 in). When spawning, the females deposit their eggs inside bivalves, where they hatch and the young remain until they can swim.
