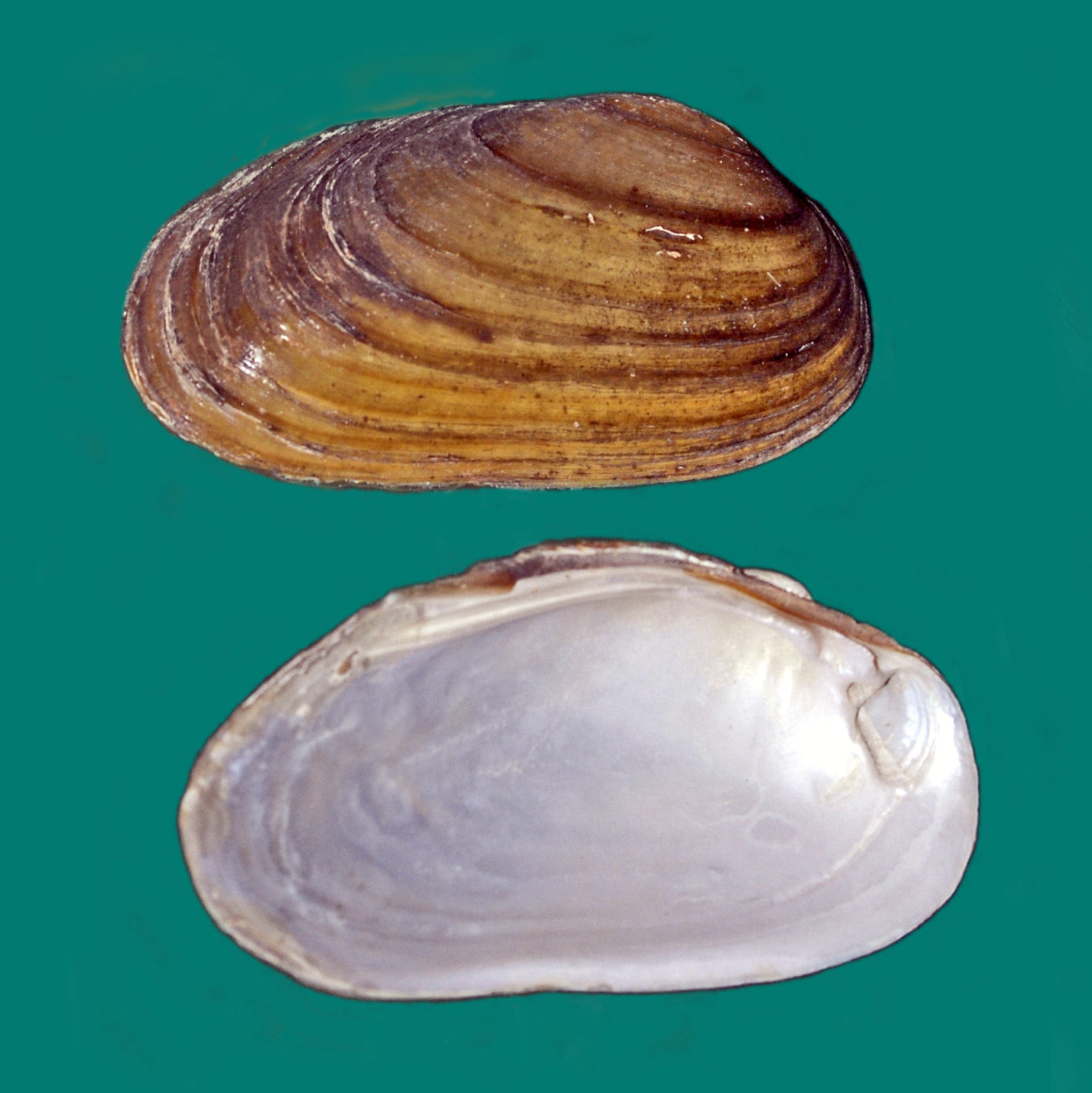
- A view of valves of Unio mancus
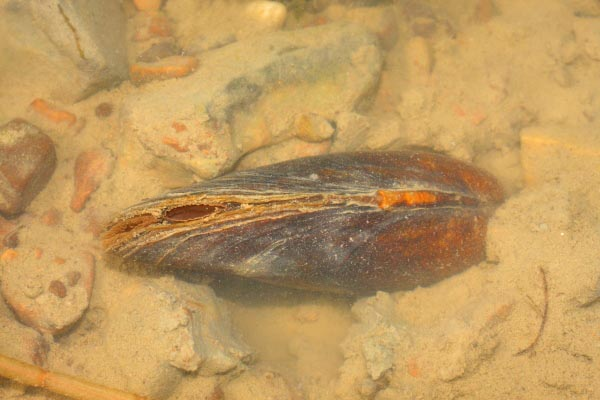
- A live individual of Unio mancus

Conservation status
- Near Threatened (IUCN 3.1)

Scientific classification
- Kingdom: Animalia
- Phylum: Mollusca
- Class: Bivalvia
- Order: Unionida
- Family: Unionidae
- Subfamily: Unioninae
- Tribe: Unionini
- Genus: Unio
- Species: U. mancus

Binomial name
- Unio mancus Lamarck, 1819

Synonyms
- Unio elongatulus Pfeiffer, 1825; Unio emarginatus I. Lea, 1834 ·; Unio fascellinus Locard, 1882; Unio lagnisicus Bourguignat, 1882 ·; Unio manca Lamarck, 1819; Unio plebeius Drouët, 1888 (junior homonym of Unio compressus var. plebius C.B. Adams, 1842); Unio suborbicularis Drouët, 1888; Unio valentinus Rossmässler, 1854 (junior synonym); Unio voltzii var. ursannensis Kobelt, 1911 (junior synonym)

= Unio mancus =

Species of bivalve

Unio mancus is a species of freshwater mussel, an aquatic bivalve mollusk in the family Unionidae, the river mussels.

Subspecies

- Unio mancus mancus Lamarck, 1819
- Unio mancus requienii Michaud, 1831
- Unio mancus turtonii Payraudeau, 1826

== Distribution ==
This species can be found from northeast Spain throughout the Mediterranean zone, northeast Africa and in the Middle East. It is present in Austria, Bosnia and Herzegovina, Croatia, Cyprus, France, Greece, Italy, Lebanon, Montenegro, Slovenia, Spain, Switzerland, Syria and Turkey.

== Description ==
Shells of Unio mancus usually reach a size of 55–65 millimetres (2.2–2.6 in), with a maximum of 10 centimetres (3.9 in). These freshwater mussels have a dark brown or yellowish-green periostracum. The shells are equivalve, inequilateral and oval-shaped, with a rounded anterior margin and a truncated posterior margin. The inner is iridescent white.
