= Rhodeus shitaiensis =

Conservation status
- Vulnerable (IUCN 3.1)

Scientific classification
- Kingdom: Animalia
- Phylum: Chordata
- Class: Actinopterygii
- Order: Cypriniformes
- Suborder: Cyprinoidei
- Family: Acheilognathidae
- Genus: Rhodeus
- Species: R. shitaiensis

Binomial name
- Rhodeus shitaiensis Li & Arai, 2011

Species of fish

Rhodeus shitaiensis is a species of freshwater ray-finned fish in the genus Rhodeus. It is endemic to China, where it is found in the Qiupu River of the Yangtze River drainage.
