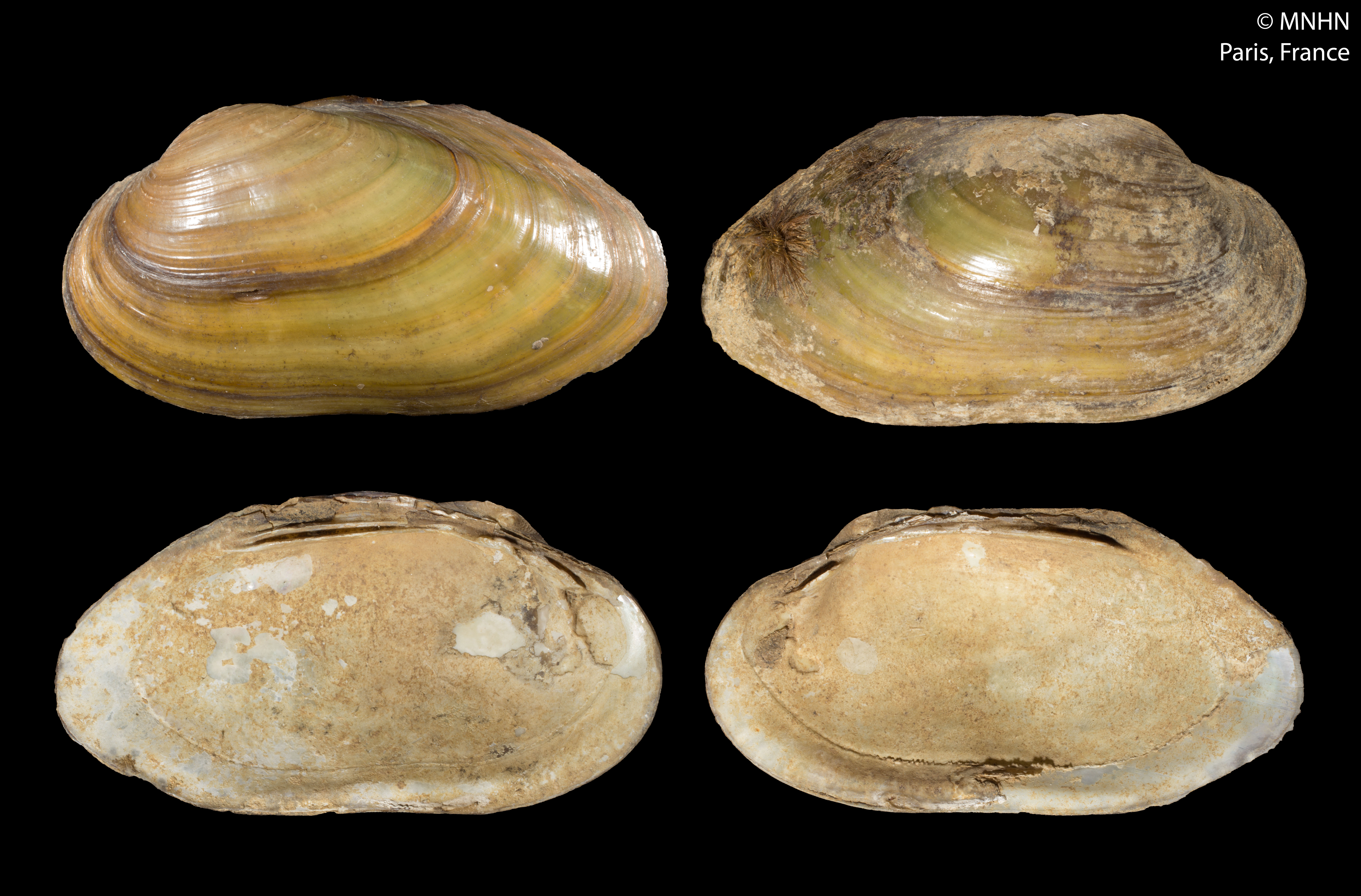
- Shell of Unio delphinus (lectotype at MNHN, Paris)

Conservation status
- Endangered (IUCN 3.1)

Scientific classification
- Kingdom: Animalia
- Phylum: Mollusca
- Class: Bivalvia
- Order: Unionida
- Family: Unionidae
- Subfamily: Unioninae
- Tribe: Unionini
- Genus: Unio
- Species: U. delphinus

Binomial name
- Unio delphinus Spengler, 1793

Synonyms
- Unio hispanus Rossmässler, 1844 (junior synonym); Unio hispanus var. sevillensis Kobelt, 1888 (junior synonym)

= Unio delphinus =

Species of bivalve

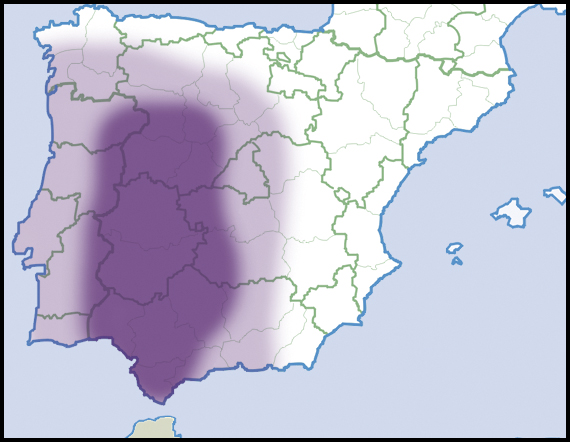
Native range of the species

Unio delphinus is a species of bivalve belonging to the family Unionidae.

== Distribution ==
This species occurs in the Atlantic basins of the Iberian Peninsula and Morocco
