= Rhodeus amurensis =

Conservation status
- Least Concern (IUCN 3.1)

Scientific classification
- Kingdom: Animalia
- Phylum: Chordata
- Class: Actinopterygii
- Order: Cypriniformes
- Suborder: Cyprinoidei
- Family: Acheilognathidae
- Genus: Rhodeus
- Species: R. amurensis

Binomial name
- Rhodeus amurensis (Vronsky, 1967)

Species of fish

Rhodeus amurensis is a temperate freshwater ray-finned fish belonging to the family Acheilognathidae, the bitterlings. It originates in the Amur River and Lake Khanka in Asia, and is found in China and Russia. It was originally described as Pseudoperilampus lighti amurensis by B.B. Vronsky in 1967, and has also been referred to in scientific literature as Rhodeus lighti amurensis.

The females deposit their eggs inside bivalves, where they hatch and the young remain until they can swim.
