= Rhodeus monguonensis =

Scientific classification
- Domain: Eukaryota
- Kingdom: Animalia
- Phylum: Chordata
- Class: Actinopterygii
- Order: Cypriniformes
- Suborder: Cyprinoidei
- Family: Acheilognathidae
- Genus: Rhodeus
- Species: R. monguonensis

Binomial name
- Rhodeus monguonensis Li, 1989

Synonyms
- Pseudoperilampus monguonensis Li, 1989

Species of fish

Rhodeus monguonensis is a species of freshwater ray-finned fish in the genus Rhodeus. It is endemic to China.
