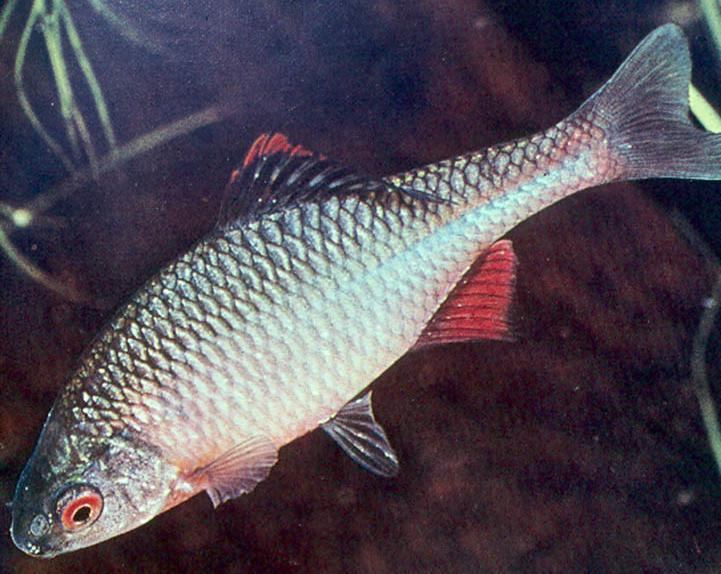

Conservation status
- Least Concern (IUCN 3.1)

Scientific classification
- Kingdom: Animalia
- Phylum: Chordata
- Class: Actinopterygii
- Division: Teleostei
- Order: Cypriniformes
- Family: Acheilognathidae
- Genus: Rhodeus
- Species: R. sericeus

Binomial name
- Rhodeus sericeus (Pallas, 1776)

Synonyms
- Cyprinus sericeus Pallas, 1776

= Amur bitterling =

Species of fish

The Amur bitterling (Rhodeus sericeus) is a small fish of the carp family. It is sometimes just called "bitterling", which dates back to the time when the European bitterling (Rhodeus amarus) was still considered conspecific with R. sericeus, and "bitterling" properly refers to any species in the entire genus Rhodeus. The Amur bitterling is found in Siberia, while the European bitterling is found from European Russia westwards.

Mussels form an essential part of their reproductive system, with bitterling eggs being laid inside them. Long thought to be symbiotic with the mussels (whose larval phase attaches to fish gills during development), recent research has indicated they are, in fact, parasitic, with co-evolution being seen in Chinese bitterling and mussel species.

Bitterlings usually reside in areas with dense plant growth. They are hardy fish and can survive in water that is not very well oxygenated. They grow to be 3–4 in (76–102 mm) long at most. The bitterling's diet consists of plant material and small larvae of insects.

== Colour variation ==
Transparent scale variants of bitterlings occur, though not commonly, and are exploited in the aquarium trade.
