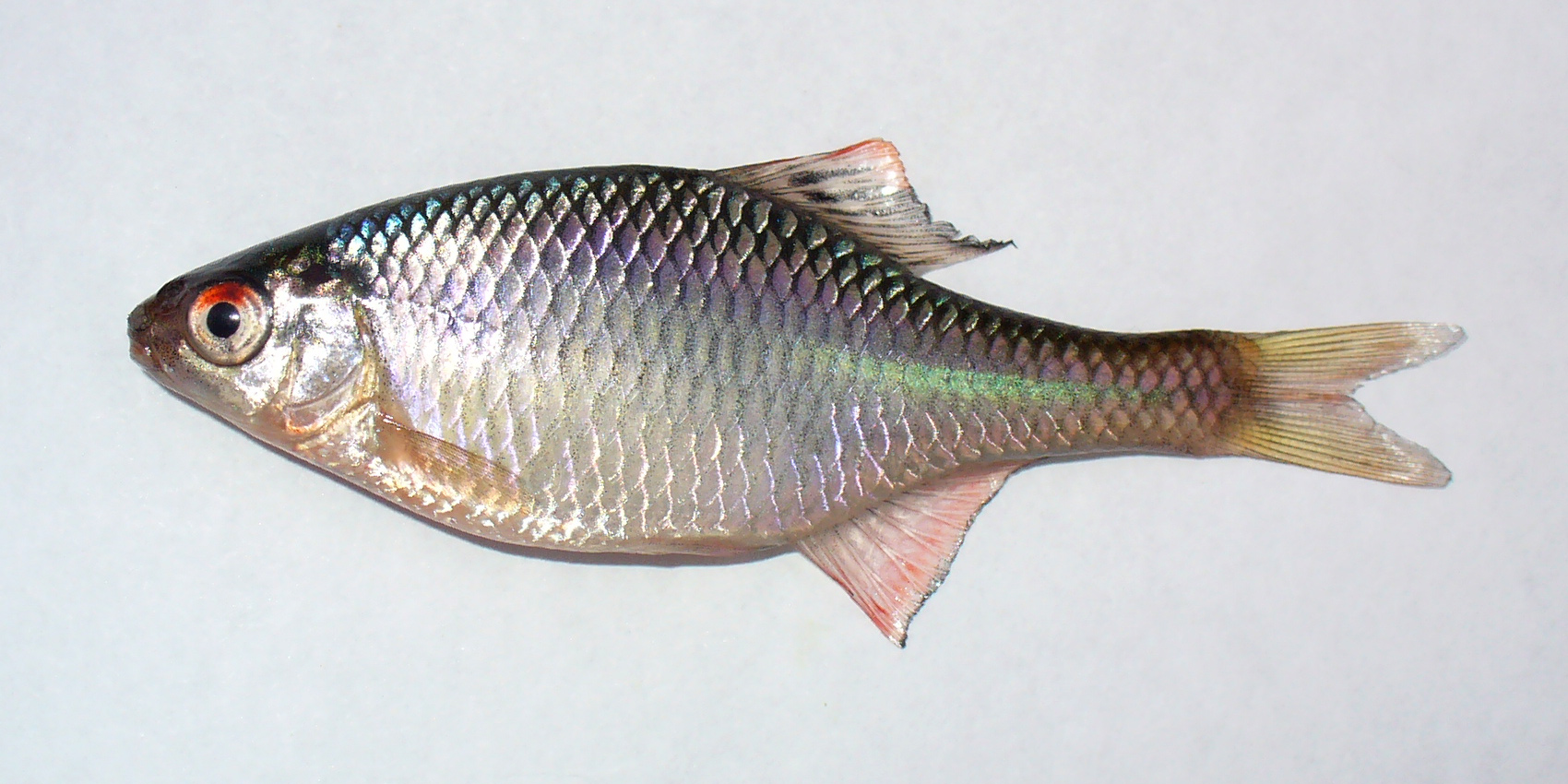

Conservation status
- Least Concern (IUCN 3.1)

Scientific classification
- Kingdom: Animalia
- Phylum: Chordata
- Class: Actinopterygii
- Order: Cypriniformes
- Suborder: Cyprinoidei
- Family: Acheilognathidae
- Genus: Rhodeus
- Species: R. amarus

Binomial name
- Rhodeus amarus (Bloch, 1782)

Synonyms
- Cyprinus amarus Bloch, 1782; Rhodeus sericeus amarus (Bloch, 1782); Rhodeus lucinae Walecki, 1863; Rhodeus genitalis Walecki, 1863

= European bitterling =

Species of fish

The European bitterling (Rhodeus amarus) is a temperate freshwater ray-finned fish belonging to the family Acheilognathidae, the bitterlings. It originates in Europe, ranging from the Rhone River basin in France to the Neva River in Russia. It was originally described as Cyprinus amarus by Marcus Elieser Bloch in 1782, and has been referred to in scientific literature as Rhodeus sericeus amarus. It is known simply as "the bitterling" in its native range, where it is the only species of its genus Rhodeus, and sometimes in the scientific literature, also, but this is technically wrong, being a leftover from the times when the European bitterling was united with its Siberian relative, the Amur bitterling, in R. sericeus. Properly, "bitterling" can refer to any species of Acheilognathus or Rhodeus.

The fish reaches a size of up to 10 cm (4 in). It is found among plants over sandy and muddy bottoms in shallow waters. It feeds mainly on plants, and to a lesser extent, upon worms, crustaceans, and insect larvae.

This species of fish was once used for human pregnancy tests. Female specimens were injected with the urine of the woman to be tested. If the woman was pregnant, the hormones in the urine would cause the fish's ovipositors to protrude.

The fish spawns in clear, slow-running or still water, often with a muddy bottom. The female deposits her eggs inside freshwater mussels. The male sheds his sperm into the inhalent current of the respiring mussel and thereby fertilizes the eggs. The young hatch and remain protected within the mussel for about a month, eventually leaving the mussel as actively swimming larvae. Both sexes reach sexual maturity in one year, at a length of 30 to 35 mm (1.2 to 1.4 in).

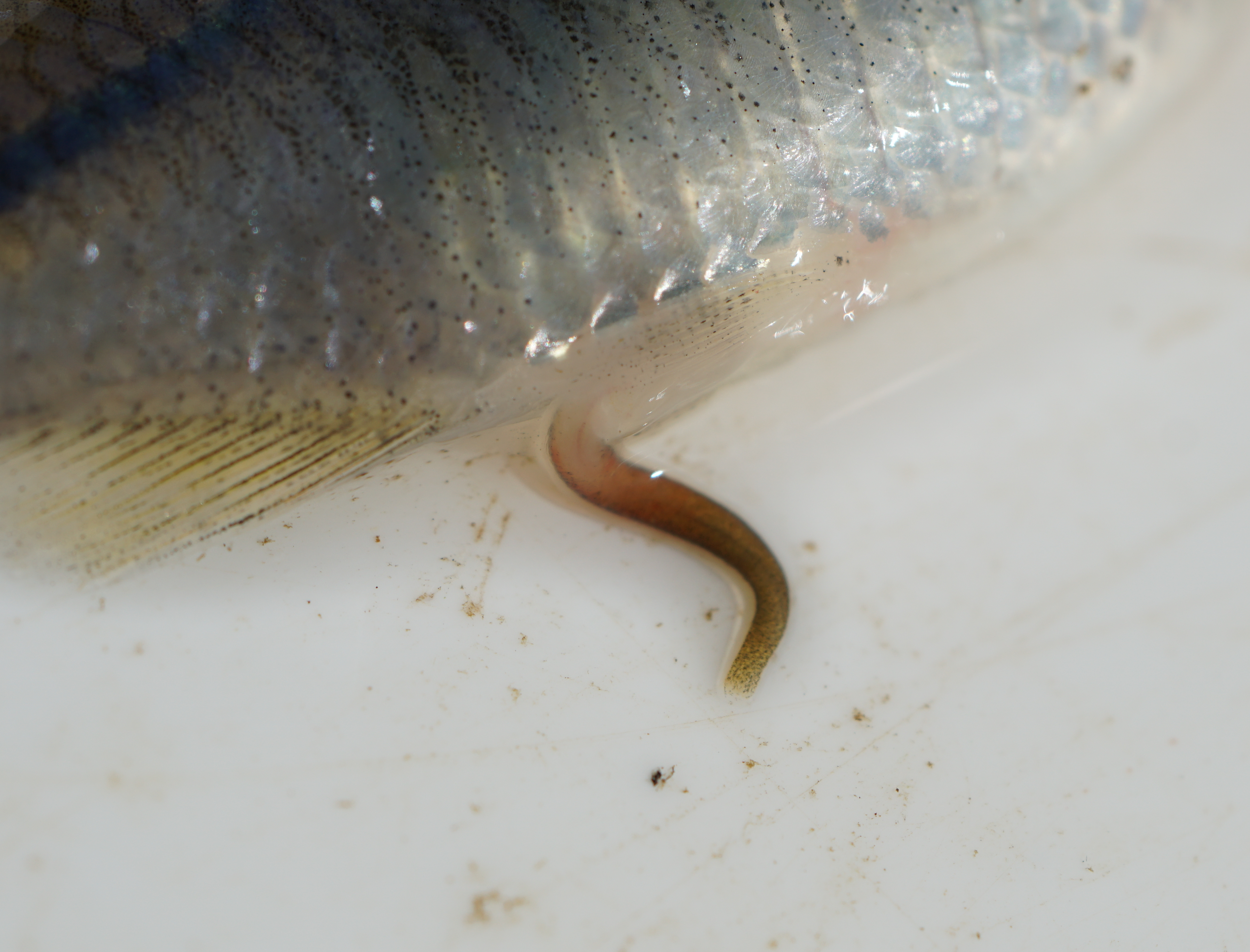
Laying tube of the bitterling
