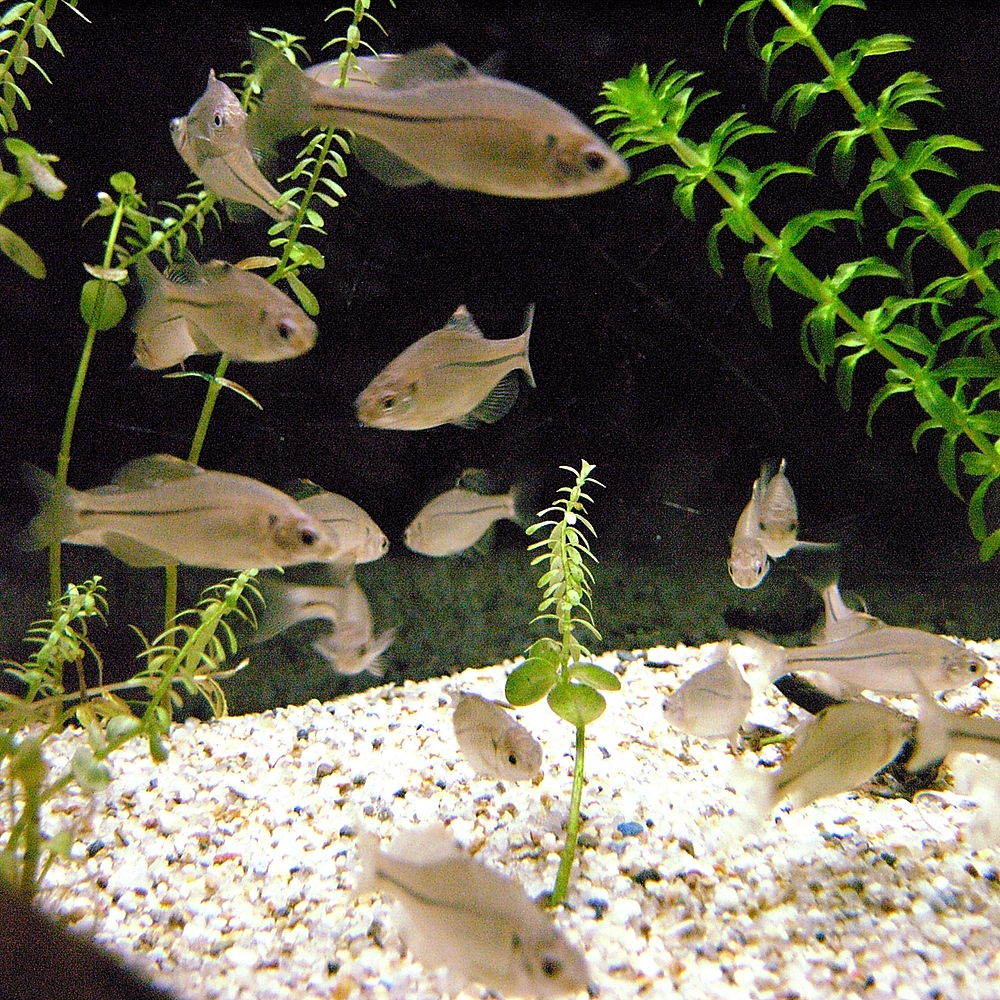

Conservation status
- Data Deficient (IUCN 3.1)

Scientific classification
- Kingdom: Animalia
- Phylum: Chordata
- Class: Actinopterygii
- Order: Cypriniformes
- Suborder: Cyprinoidei
- Family: Acheilognathidae
- Genus: Rhodeus
- Species: R. suigensis

Binomial name
- Rhodeus suigensis (T. Mori, 1935)

Synonyms
- Pseudoperilampus suigensis Mori, 1935

= Rhodeus suigensis =

Species of fish

Rhodeus suigensis is a temperate freshwater ray-finned fish belonging to the family Acheilognathidae, the bitterlings. It originated in inland rivers in Japan and the Korean peninsula. It was originally described as Pseudoperilampus suigensis by T. Mori in 1935, and has also been referred to as Rhodeus atremius suigensis in scientific literature. The species was listed as endangered in 1994 by the World Conservation Monitoring Centre, but in 1996 was relisted as "data deficient". When spawning, the females deposit their eggs inside bivalves, where they hatch and the young remain until they can swim.
