= Altha (disambiguation) =

Altha may refer to:

- Altha, Florida, a town in Florida
- Altha (moth), a genus of moth
- Altha Lake, a lake in California
