= Parasa euchlora =

Scientific classification
- Domain: Eukaryota
- Kingdom: Animalia
- Phylum: Arthropoda
- Class: Insecta
- Order: Lepidoptera
- Family: Limacodidae
- Subfamily: Limacodinae
- Genus: Parasa
- Species: P. euchlora

Binomial name
- Parasa euchlora Karsch, 1896

Species of moth

Parasa euchlora is a species of moth in the genus Parasa. It is in the family Limacodidae and the subfamily Limacodinae.

== Distribution ==
Parasa euchlora occurs in Cameroon, Ghana, Liberia, Nigeria and Togo.

== Larval foodplants ==
The larval foodplant of Parasa euchlora is Vitex doniana.
