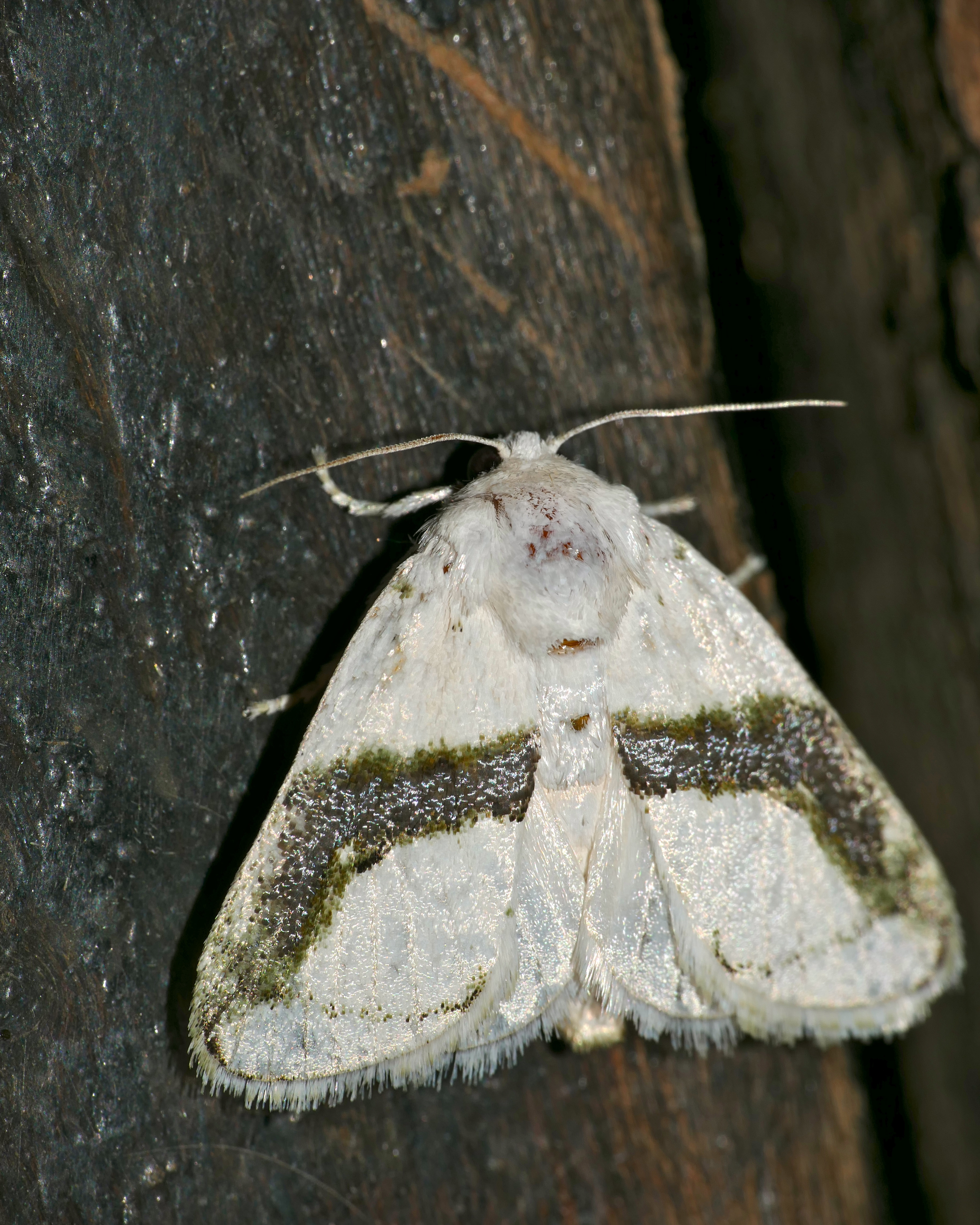

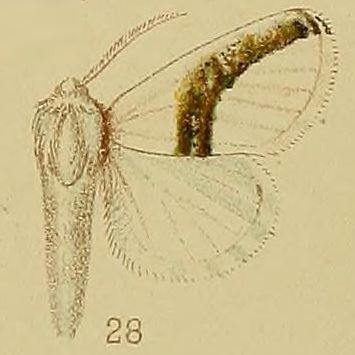

Scientific classification
- Kingdom: Animalia
- Phylum: Arthropoda
- Clade: Pancrustacea
- Class: Insecta
- Order: Lepidoptera
- Family: Limacodidae
- Genus: Afraltha
- Species: A. chionostola

Binomial name
- Afraltha chionostola (Hampson, 1910)

= Afraltha chionostola =

Species of moth

Afraltha chionostola, the learner slug, is a species of moths in the genus Afraltha. It’s in the family Limacodidae and in the subfamily Limacodinae.

== Distribution ==
Afraltha chionostola occurs in Angola, Botswana, DR Congo, Malawi, Namibia, South Africa, Zambia and Zimbabwe.
