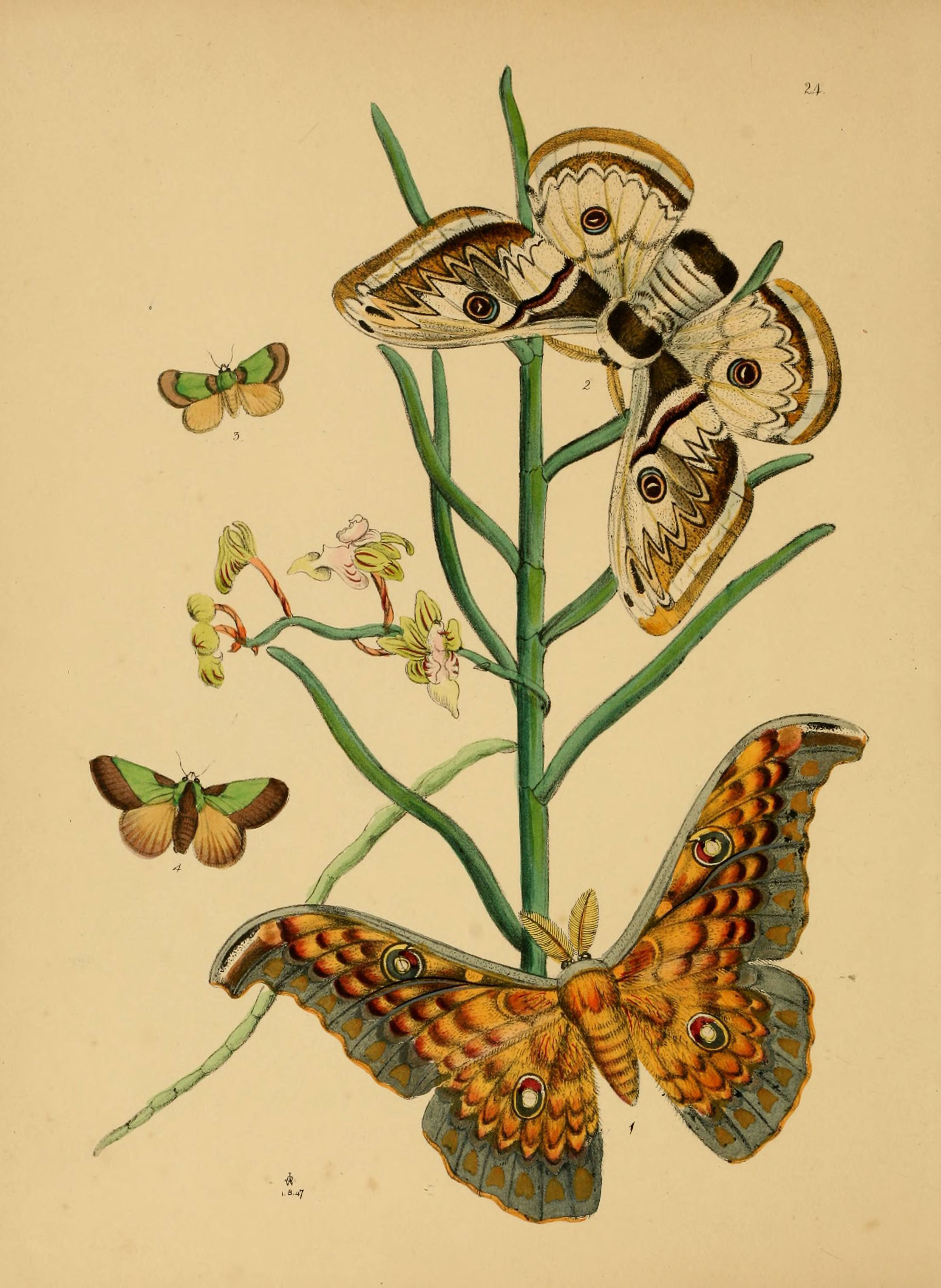

Scientific classification
- Kingdom: Animalia
- Phylum: Arthropoda
- Class: Insecta
- Order: Lepidoptera
- Family: Limacodidae
- Genus: Parasa
- Species: P. hilaris

Binomial name
- Parasa hilaris Meyrick, 1913

= Parasa hilaris =

Species of moth

Parasa hilaris is a moth of the family Limacodidae first described by Edward Meyrick in 1913. It is found in Sri Lanka and India.

Adult wingspan is 32 mm. Palpi projecting beyond frontal tuft. Head green with reddish-brown sides. Thorax green. Abdomen brownish green. Legs with pale tipped joints. Hind tibiae have a terminal pair of spurs. Forewings with a reddish-brown patch which covers basal area. Marginal band with an irregular inner edge. Hindwings pale green with a slight brown tinge towards outer margin.

It is a pest of Azadirachta indica.
