= Parasa similis =

Scientific classification
- Kingdom: Animalia
- Phylum: Arthropoda
- Class: Insecta
- Order: Lepidoptera
- Family: Limacodidae
- Genus: Parasa
- Species: P. similis

Binomial name
- Parasa similis Felder, 1874

Species of moth

Parasa similis is a moth of the family Limacodidae first described by Felder in 1874. It is found in Sri Lanka.
