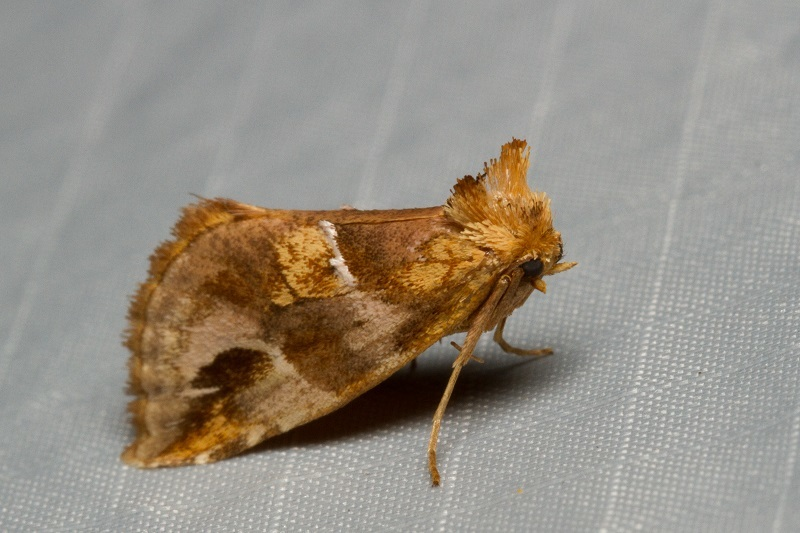
- Crothaema decorata

Scientific classification
- Kingdom: Animalia
- Phylum: Arthropoda
- Class: Insecta
- Order: Lepidoptera
- Family: Limacodidae
- Subfamily: Limacodinae
- Genus: Crothaema; Butler, 1880

Type species
- Crothaema sericea Butler, 1880

= Crothaema =

Genus of moths

Crothaema is a genus of moths in the family Limacodidae.

== Species ==
Some species of this genus are:

- Crothaema conspicua Janse, 1964
- Crothaema decorata Distant, 1892
- Crothaema flava Berio, 1940
- Crothaema gloriosa Hering, 1928
- Crothaema mormopis Meyrick, 1934
- Crothaema ornata Romieux, 1934
- Crothaema schoutedeni Hering, 1954
- Crothaema sericea Butler, 1880
- Crothaema trichromata West, 1937
