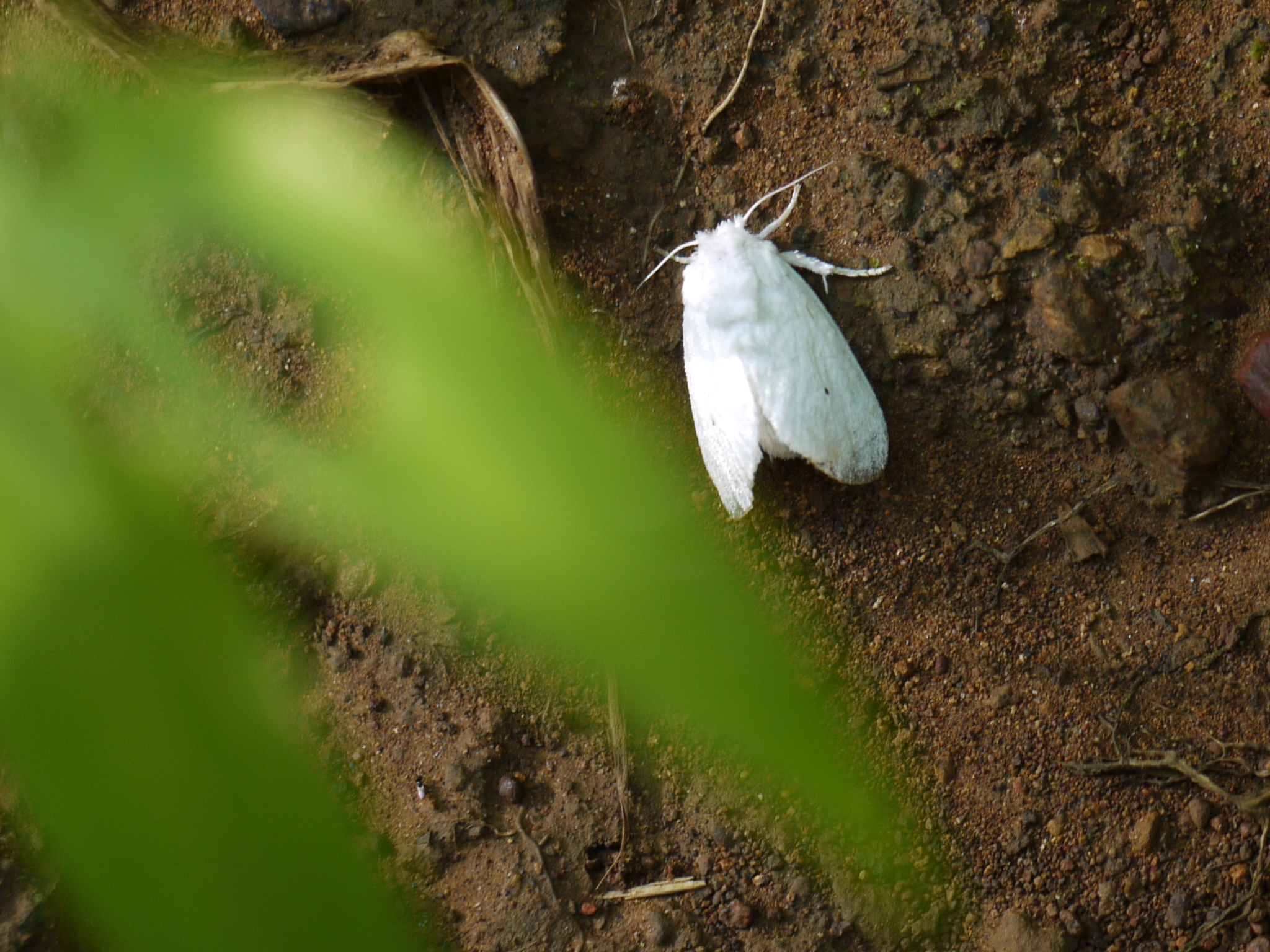

Scientific classification
- Kingdom: Animalia
- Phylum: Arthropoda
- Class: Insecta
- Order: Lepidoptera
- Family: Limacodidae
- Genus: Altha
- Species: A. subnotata

Binomial name
- Altha subnotata (Walker, 1865)

Synonyms
- Belgoraea subnotata Walker, 1865; Altha (Belgoraea) subnotata Walker, 1865

= Altha subnotata =

Species of moth

Altha subnotata is a moth of the family Limacodidae first described by Francis Walker in 1865. It is found in Sri Lanka, India, Brazil, and Nepal.

Altha subnotata can be identified by its short and slight palpi and the lack of spurs on its mid and hind tibia. The head, thorax and abdomen of the moth are pure white, and its wings are broad and rounded. Its forewings are bright white with a black dot beyond the lower end of the cell and two dots are found on the outer margin below the apex. The underside with the cost of the forewing costa are black. Its hind wings are white with two black dots on the outer margin below apex.

The caterpillar is sluggish and is found on the underside of leaves. Its body is a perfectly semi-ovoid. Early instars are greyish white and translucent. A transverse olive-brown band is present anteriorly, centrally and posteriorly. A double dorsal series of six transparent glossy humps are visible with a lens when the caterpillar reaches later instars. Late instars are pale bluish green with a narrow white dorsal band. On the flank, there are several wavy dorsal lines. A yellow sub-lateral stripe is present. Pupation occurs in a white ovoid cocoon, which is dull, hard and smooth.
