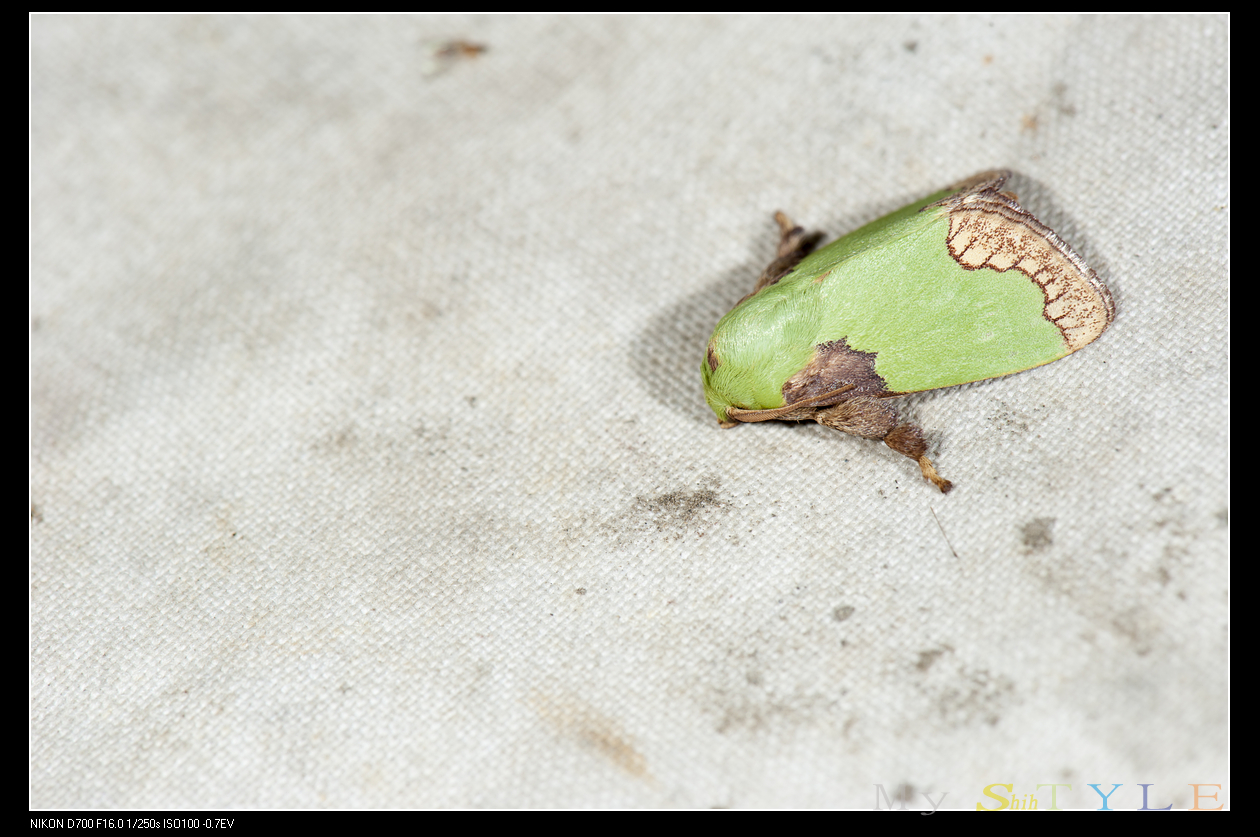

Scientific classification
- Domain: Eukaryota
- Kingdom: Animalia
- Phylum: Arthropoda
- Class: Insecta
- Order: Lepidoptera
- Family: Limacodidae
- Genus: Parasa
- Species: P. consocia

Binomial name
- Parasa consocia Walker, 1865

Synonyms
- Parasa tessellata Moore, 1877; Heterogenea princeps Staudinger, 1887

= Parasa consocia =

Species of moth

Parasa consocia is a moth of the family Limacodidae. It is found in the Russian Far East, Japan, China, Taiwan and North East India.
