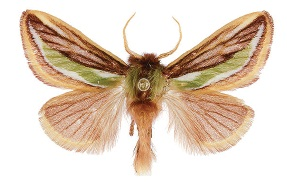

Scientific classification
- Domain: Eukaryota
- Kingdom: Animalia
- Phylum: Arthropoda
- Class: Insecta
- Order: Lepidoptera
- Family: Limacodidae
- Genus: Parasa
- Species: P. minwangi

Binomial name
- Parasa minwangi Wu & Chang, 2013

= Parasa minwangi =

Species of moth

Parasa minwangi is a moth of the family Limacodidae. It is found in the Nanling Mountains of southern China (Henan, Guangxi, Anhui, Hubei, Sichuan, Yunnan, Shaanxi and Gansu). The habitat consists of mid-elevation mountain areas (altitudes ranging from 600 to 1,400 meters).

The wingspan is 21–22 mm. The forewing ground colour is chestnut with an ochreous stripe and a large median green patch delimited by slender white lines and a subsequent wide brown border. The hindwings are chestnut. Adults have been recorded on wing in April, May, June, August and September, possibly in two generations per year.

== Etymology ==
The species is named in honour of Dr. Min Wang, who represents the main collector of most of the type material of the species.
