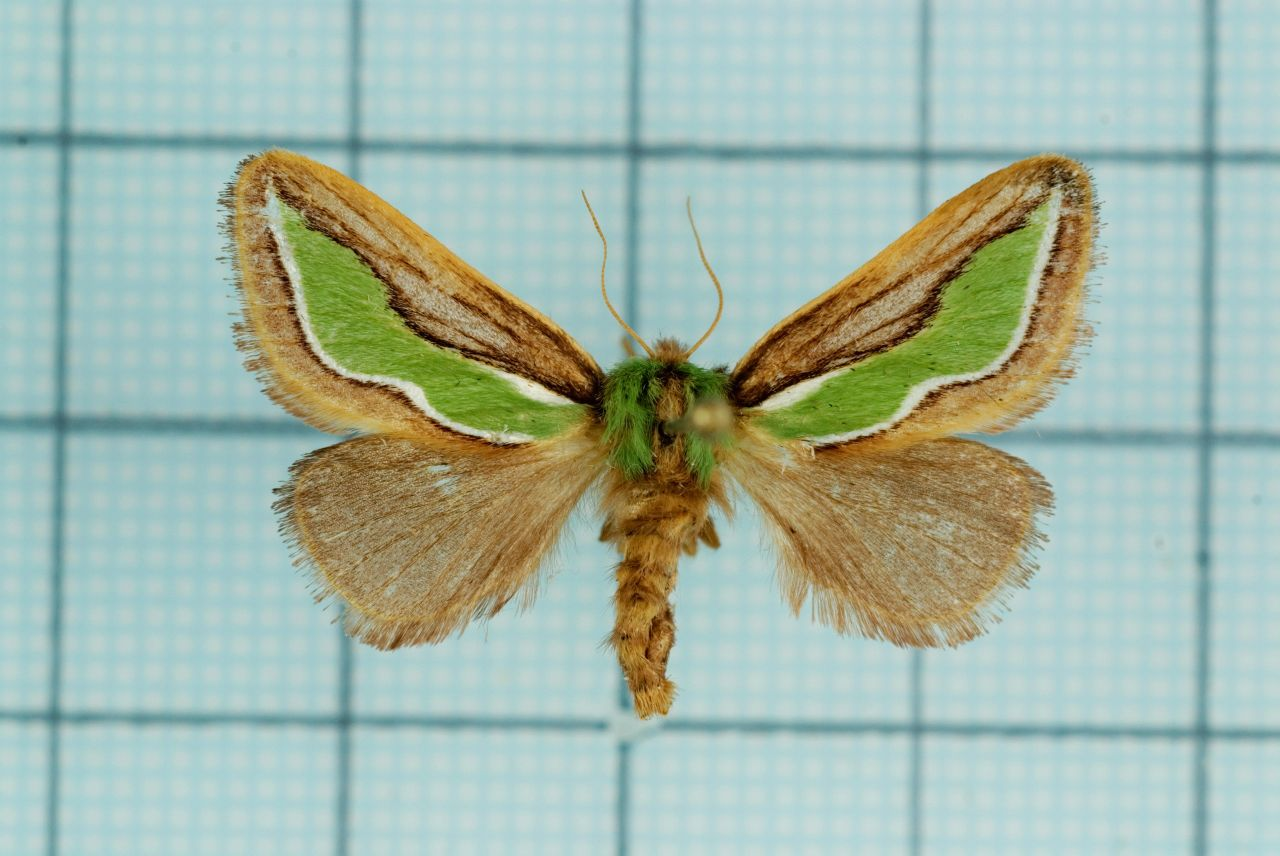

Scientific classification
- Kingdom: Animalia
- Phylum: Arthropoda
- Clade: Pancrustacea
- Class: Insecta
- Order: Lepidoptera
- Family: Limacodidae
- Genus: Parasa
- Species: P. darma

Binomial name
- Parasa darma Moore, 1859

= Parasa darma =

Species of moth

Parasa darma is a moth of the family Limacodidae. It is found in Burma, Sundaland, Palawan and Taiwan.

The wingspan is 21–31 mm.

The larvae feed on Cocos species. They are green with blue bands.
