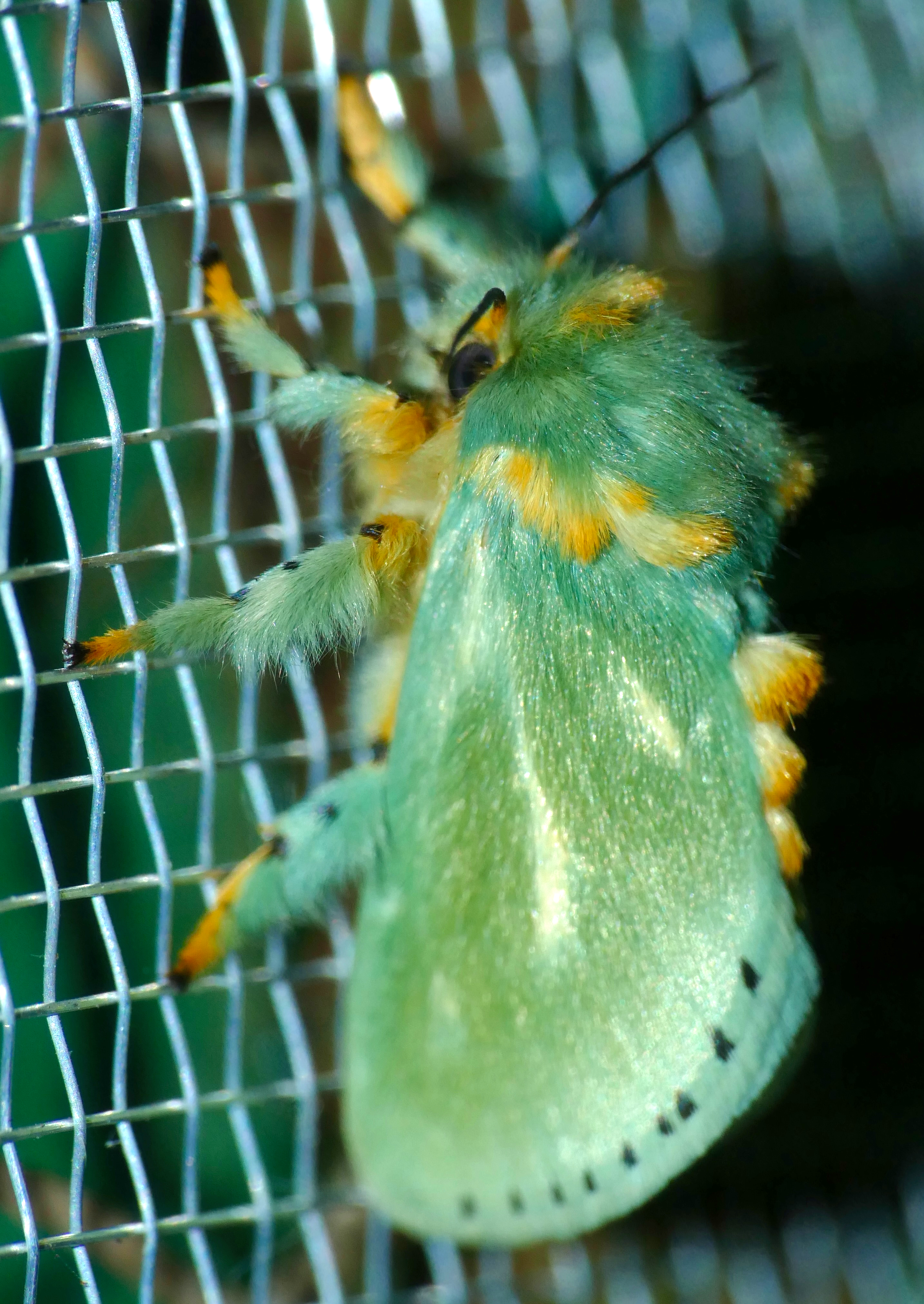
- Adult
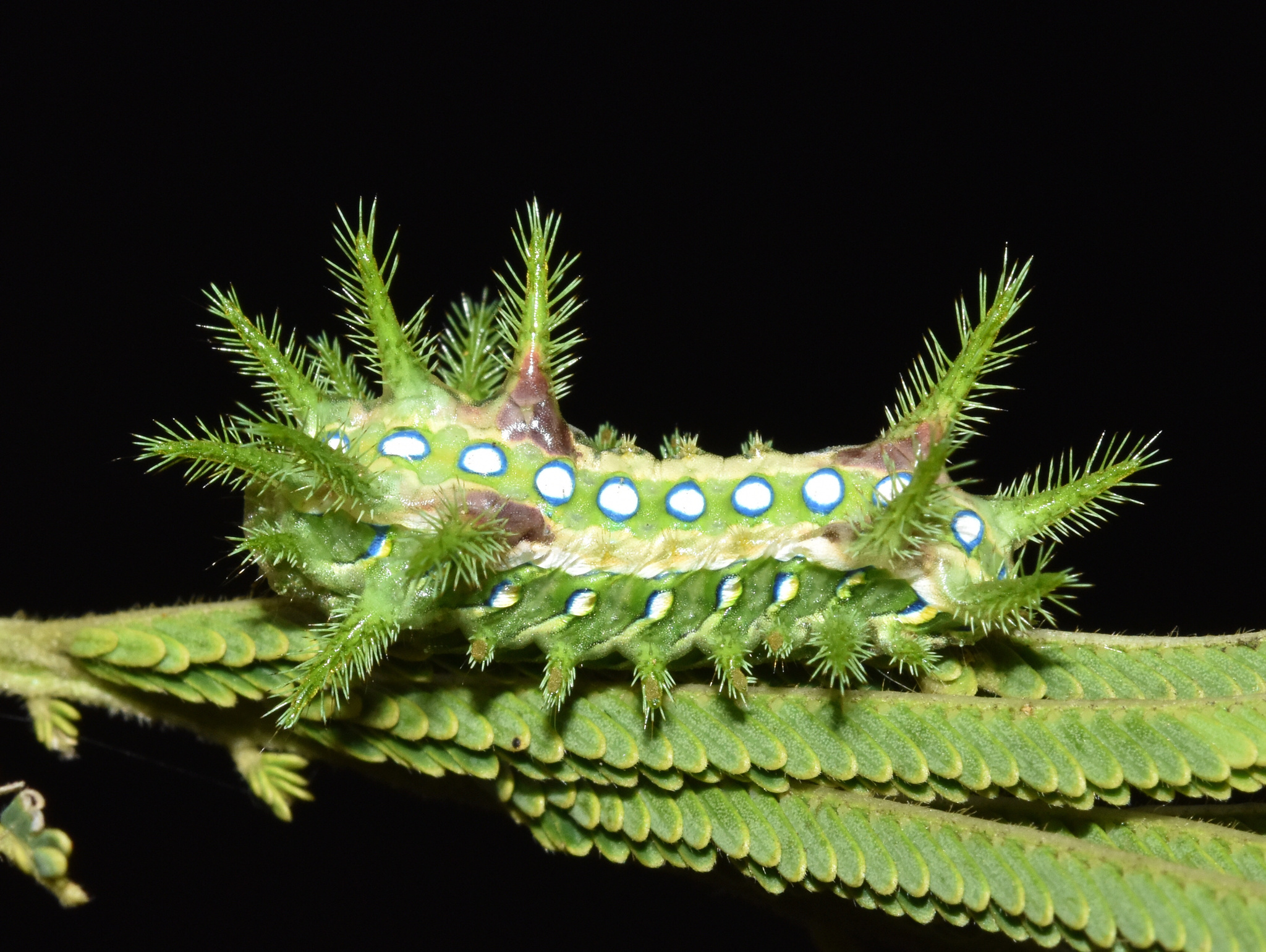
- Larvae

Scientific classification
- Kingdom: Animalia
- Phylum: Arthropoda
- Class: Insecta
- Order: Lepidoptera
- Family: Limacodidae
- Genus: Coenobasis
- Species: C. amoena

Binomial name
- Coenobasis amoena Felder, 1874

Synonyms
- Oeceticus buchholzi

= Coenobasis amoena =

Species of moth

Coenobasis amoena, the rayed slug, is a species of slug moth described by Rudolf Felder in 1874. The host plants of this species are: Vachellia, Acacia mearnsii and Gossypium.

== Distribution ==
The distribution of Coenobasis amoena are some of the Southern and Eastern Africa.
