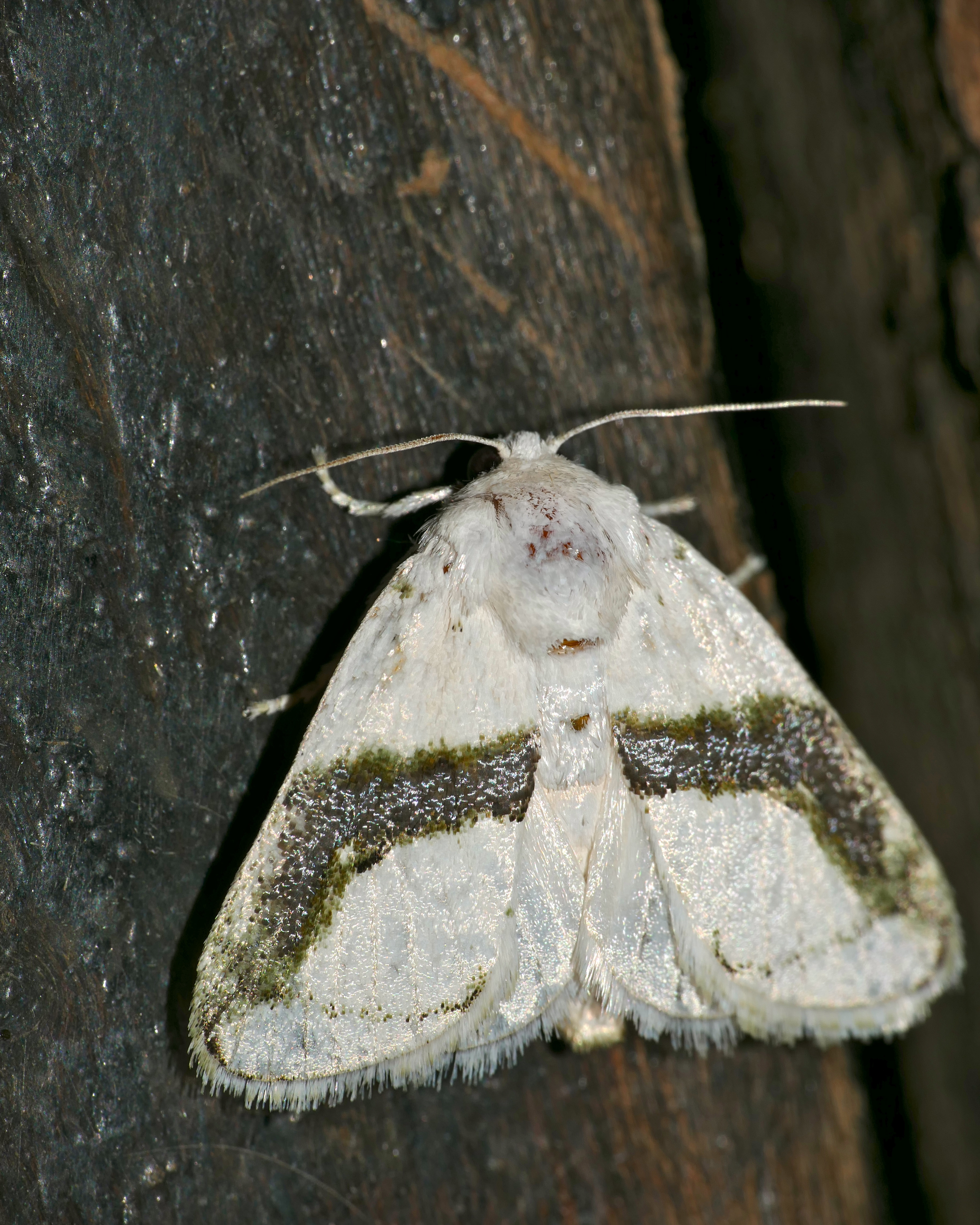
- Afraltha chionostola

Scientific classification
- Kingdom: Animalia
- Phylum: Arthropoda
- Class: Insecta
- Order: Lepidoptera
- Family: Limacodidae
- Subfamily: Limacodinae
- Genus: Afraltha; Hering, 1955

= Afraltha =

Genus of moths

Afraltha is a genus of moths in the family Limacodidae and the subfamily Limacodinae. It has 3 species.

== List of species ==
- Afraltha chionostola Hampson, 1910
- Afraltha sudanicola Clench, 1955
- Afraltha xanthocharis Clench, 1955
