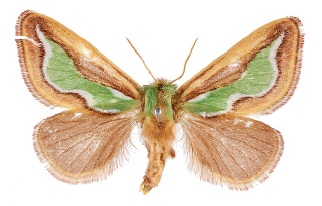
- Female
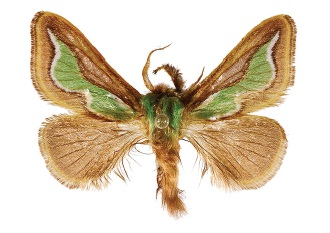
- Male

Scientific classification
- Domain: Eukaryota
- Kingdom: Animalia
- Phylum: Arthropoda
- Class: Insecta
- Order: Lepidoptera
- Family: Limacodidae
- Genus: Parasa
- Species: P. viridiflamma

Binomial name
- Parasa viridiflamma Wu & Chang, 2013

= Parasa viridiflamma =

Species of moth

Parasa viridiflamma is a moth of the family Limacodidae. It is found in Taiwan. The habitat consists of mid-elevation mountain areas (altitudes ranging from 1,400 to 2,610 meters).

The wingspan is 23–24 mm for males and about 26 mm for females. The forewing ground colour is chestnut with a median large green patch delimited externally by a white line which is in turn is lined by a brown border. All these pattern elements are strongly incurved between the cubitals and anal veins, but less so towards the termen. The hindwings are chestnut. Adults have been recorded on wing in May and from mid-June to late August possibly in one generation per year.

== Etymology ==
The species name refers to the flame-shaped green median patch on the forewing and is derived from viridis (meaning green) and flamma (meaning flame).
