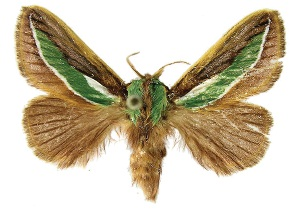

Scientific classification
- Kingdom: Animalia
- Phylum: Arthropoda
- Class: Insecta
- Order: Lepidoptera
- Family: Limacodidae
- Genus: Parasa
- Species: P. undulata

Binomial name
- Parasa undulata (Cai, 1983)

Synonyms
- Latoia undulata Cai, 1983

= Parasa undulata =

Species of moth

Parasa undulata is a moth of the family, Limacodidae. It is found in China (Henan, Guangxi, Anhui, Hubei, Sichuan, Yunnan, Shaanxi and Gansu).
