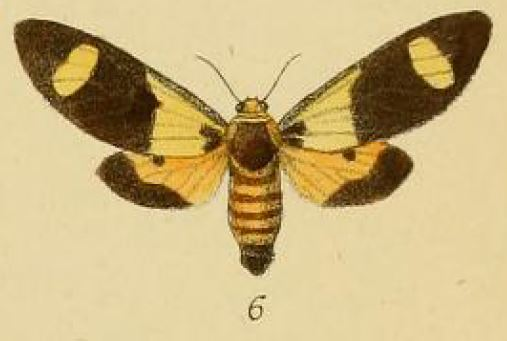
- Casphalia picta

Scientific classification
- Kingdom: Animalia
- Phylum: Arthropoda
- Class: Insecta
- Order: Lepidoptera
- Family: Limacodidae
- Subfamily: Limacodinae
- Genus: Casphalia; Walker, 1866

= Casphalia =

Genus of moths

Casphalia is a moth genus in the family Limacodidae.

== Species ==
- Casphalia citrimaculata Aurivillius 1905
- Casphalia elegans Jordan 1915
- Casphalia elongata Jordan 1915
- Casphalia extranea Walker 1869
- Casphalia flavicollis Walker 1866
- Casphalia nigerrima Holland, 1893
- Casphalia nigridorsa Aurivillius 1905
- Casphalia picta Schaus & Clements 1893
