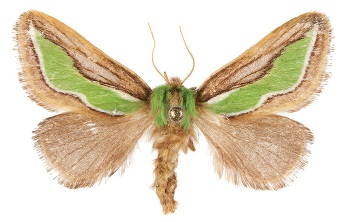
- Female
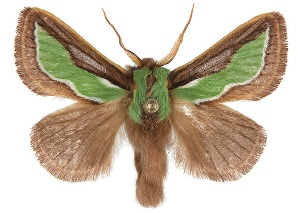
- Male

Scientific classification
- Domain: Eukaryota
- Kingdom: Animalia
- Phylum: Arthropoda
- Class: Insecta
- Order: Lepidoptera
- Family: Limacodidae
- Genus: Parasa
- Species: P. pygmy

Binomial name
- Parasa pygmy Solovyev, 2010

= Parasa pygmy =

Species of moth

Parasa pygmy is a moth of the family Limacodidae. It is found in Taiwan, inhabiting mountains, at altitudes ranging from 2,000 to 3,000 meters.

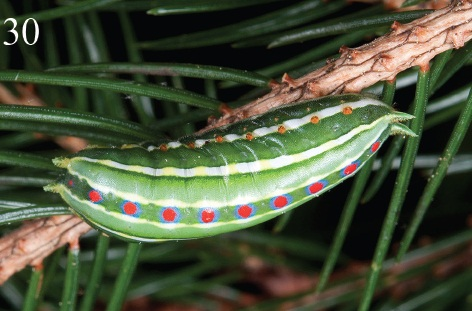
Larva

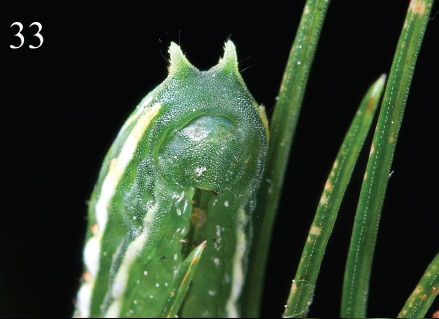
Larva

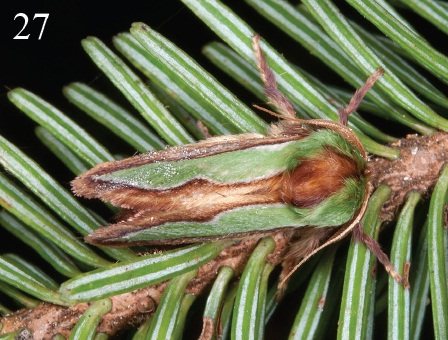
Adult male

The wingspan is 24–25 mm. The forewing ground colour is chestnut with a large median green patch delimited externally by a thin white line, which in turn is lined by a brown border. The hindwings are chestnut. Adults have been recorded on wing from mid-August to early October, probably in one generation per year.

The larvae feed on Picea morrisonicola. Larvae have been found in late May. Full-grown larvae have a spindle-like body with a length of about 20 mm. The head and body ground coloration is green. The species probably overwinters as an egg.
