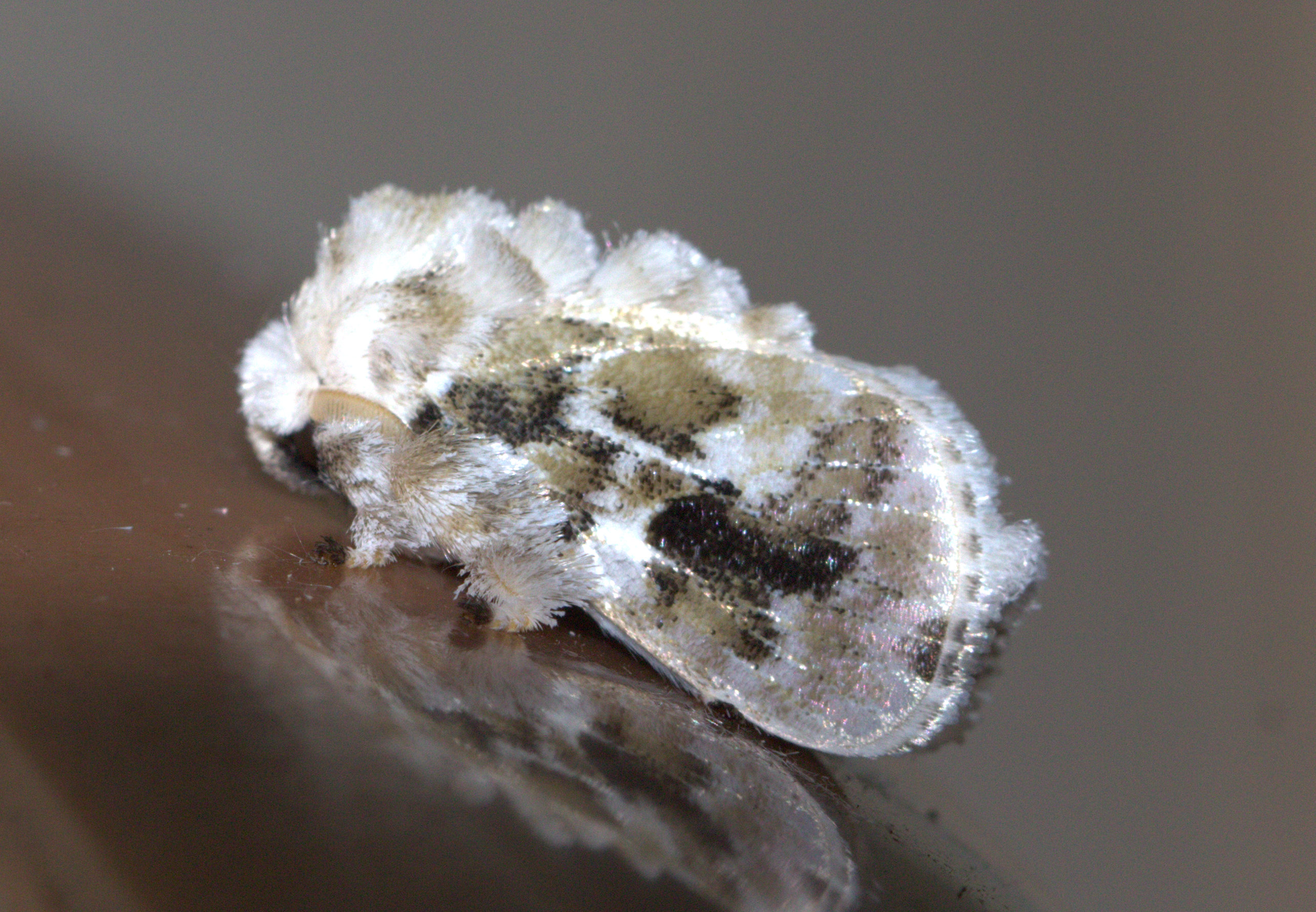

Scientific classification
- Kingdom: Animalia
- Phylum: Arthropoda
- Class: Insecta
- Order: Lepidoptera
- Family: Limacodidae
- Genus: Altha
- Species: A. nivea

Binomial name
- Altha nivea Walker, 1862

= Altha nivea =

Species of moth

Altha nivea is a moth of the family Limacodidae first described by Francis Walker in 1862. It is found in Sri Lanka, India, Borneo.

The forewings are a white-orange to brown shade. Prominent dark dots are found at one third from the apex on the wing margins.

Larval food plants include Camellia.
