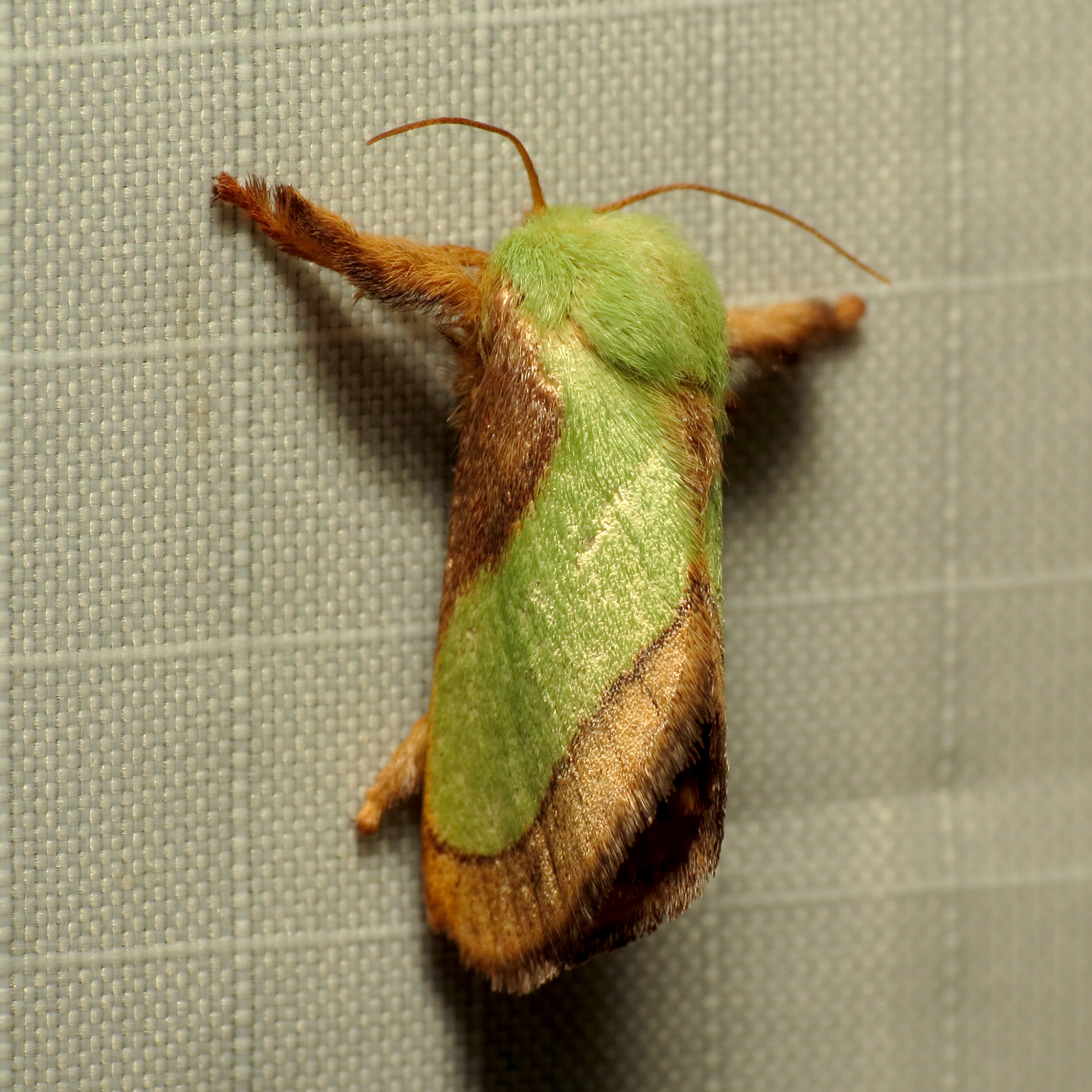

Scientific classification
- Kingdom: Animalia
- Phylum: Arthropoda
- Clade: Pancrustacea
- Class: Insecta
- Order: Lepidoptera
- Family: Limacodidae
- Genus: Parasa
- Species: P. chloris

Binomial name
- Parasa chloris (Herrich-Schaffer, 1854)

= Parasa chloris =

Species of moth

Parasa chloris, the smaller parasa, is a species of slug caterpillar moth in the family Limacodidae.

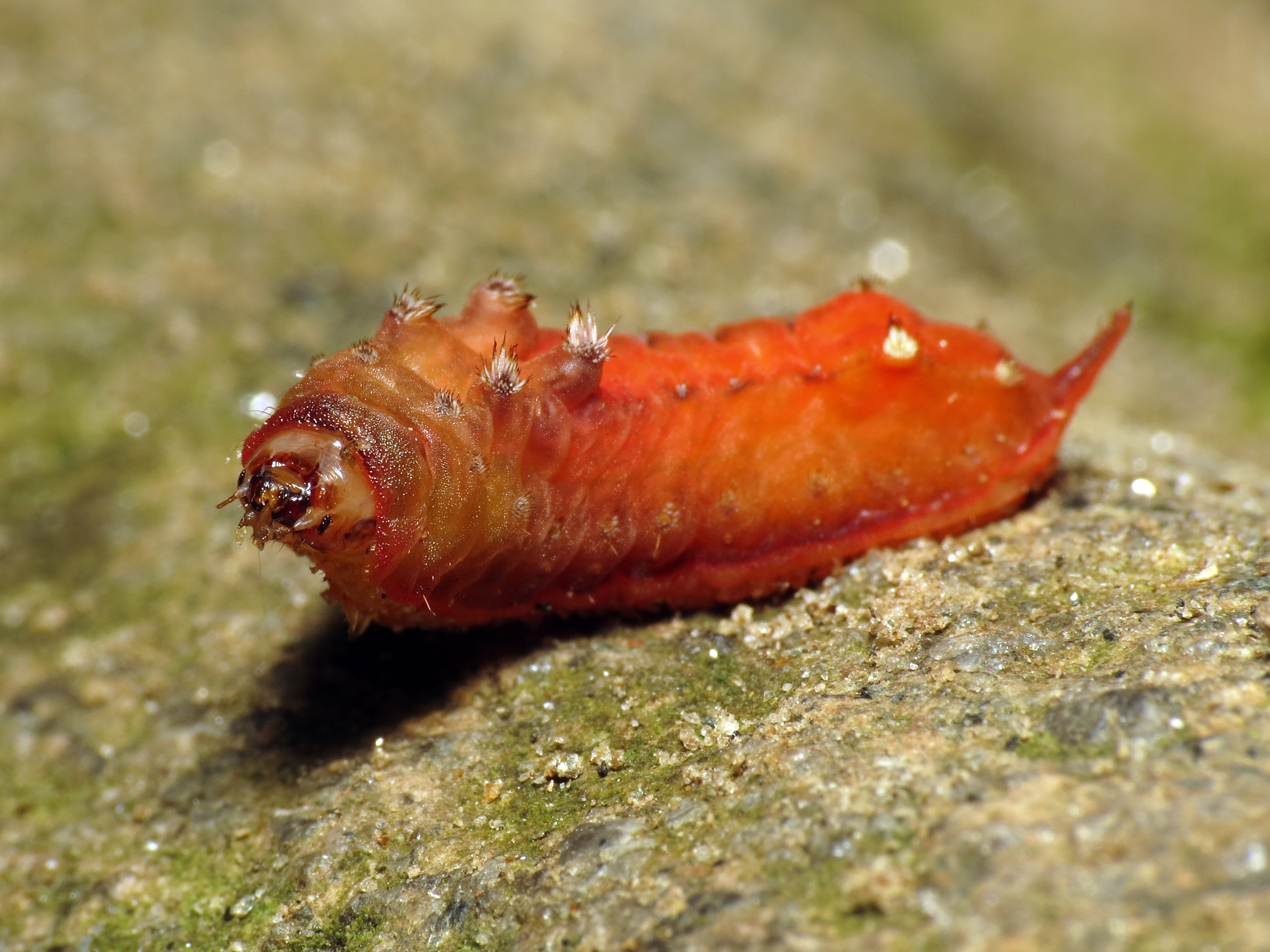
Smaller parasa, Parasa chloris

== Subspecies ==
Two subspecies are recognised:

- Parasa chloris chloris (Herrich-Schäffer, 1854)
- Parasa chloris huachuca Dyar, 1905
