= Parasa hampsoni =

Scientific classification
- Kingdom: Animalia
- Phylum: Arthropoda
- Class: Insecta
- Order: Lepidoptera
- Family: Limacodidae
- Genus: Parasa
- Species: P. hampsoni

Binomial name
- Parasa hampsoni Dyar, 1894

Synonyms
- Parasa viridis Hampson, 1893

Species of moth

Parasa hampsoni is a moth of the family Limacodidae first described by Harrison Gray Dyar Jr. in 1894. It is found in Sri Lanka.
