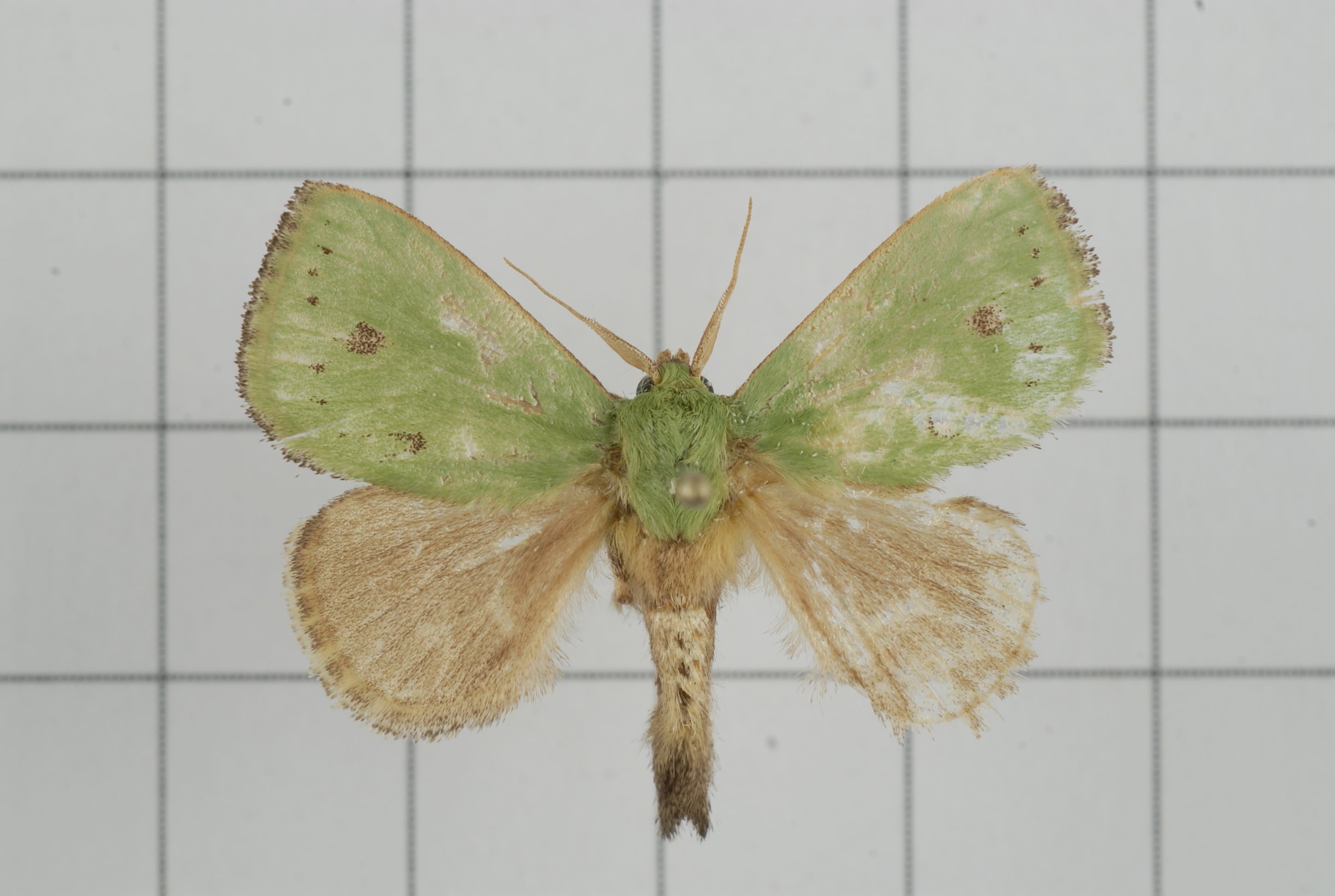

Scientific classification
- Kingdom: Animalia
- Phylum: Arthropoda
- Class: Insecta
- Order: Lepidoptera
- Family: Limacodidae
- Genus: Parasa
- Species: P. bicolor

Binomial name
- Parasa bicolor (Walker, 1855)

Synonyms
- Monema virescens Matsumura, 1915; Neaera bicolor Walker, 1855; Latoia oryzae Cai, 1983

= Parasa bicolor =

Species of moth

Parasa bicolor, the green rice moth, is a moth of the family Limacodidae. The species was first described by Francis Walker in 1855. It is found in Sri Lanka, India, Nepal, Pakistan, Myanmar, Laos, Taiwan, Vietnam, Malaysia, Java, China and Taiwan.

== Biology and control ==
Its wingspan is 13–19 mm. Head, thorax and forewings greenish. Abdomen and hindwings brownish. Caterpillar yellowish. The caterpillar undergoes eight larval instars. The female lays eggs on the undersides of leaves. Eggs hatch after 6 to 10 days. Early instars feed on leaves and leaving brownish white leaf epithelium. Late instars completely eat the leaf tissue. Pupation occurs in a cocoon within the soil.

Larval host plants are Oryza, Phyllostachys, Bambusa, Sinobambusa, Arundinaria and Pleioblastus species. Adults can be controlled by light traps. Soil turning in winter can kill overwintering caterpillars and cocoons.
