= Altha adala =

Scientific classification
- Kingdom: Animalia
- Phylum: Arthropoda
- Class: Insecta
- Order: Lepidoptera
- Family: Limacodidae
- Genus: Altha
- Species: A. adala

Binomial name
- Altha adala (Moore, 1859)

Synonyms
- Narosa adala Moore, in Horsfield & Moore, 1859

Species of moth

Altha adala is a moth of the family Limacodidae first described by Frederic Moore in 1859. It is found in Sri Lanka, India, Thailand, Myanmar, Vietnam, Java, Bali, Borneo, and Sumatra.

Forewings with dull orange shade with a central dark brown dot. The caterpillar has a greenish-white body which is ovate and without tubercles.

Larval food plants include Annona, Bauhinia, Coffea, Mangifera, Eugenia, Rosa, Psidium guajava and Mangifera indica.
