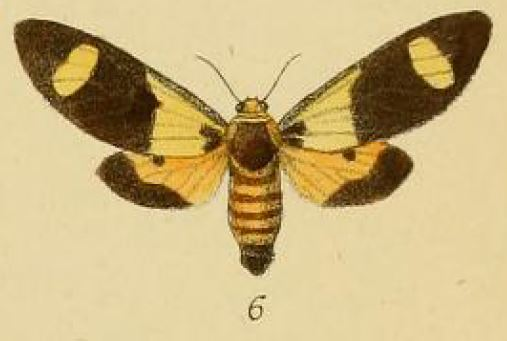

Scientific classification
- Domain: Eukaryota
- Kingdom: Animalia
- Phylum: Arthropoda
- Class: Insecta
- Order: Lepidoptera
- Family: Limacodidae
- Genus: Casphalia
- Species: C. picta

Binomial name
- Casphalia picta Schaus & Clements, 1893

= Casphalia picta =

Species of moth

Casphalia picta is a moth species in the genus Casphalia that is found in Sierra Leone. The species was first described by William Schaus and W. G. Clements in 1893.
