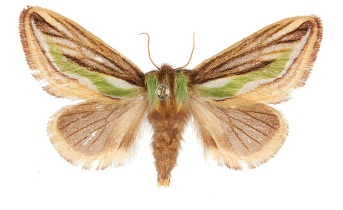
- Female
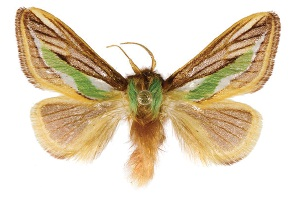
- Male

Scientific classification
- Domain: Eukaryota
- Kingdom: Animalia
- Phylum: Arthropoda
- Class: Insecta
- Order: Lepidoptera
- Family: Limacodidae
- Genus: Parasa
- Species: P. martini

Binomial name
- Parasa martini Solovyev, 2010

= Parasa martini =

Species of moth

Parasa martini is a moth of the family Limacodidae. It is found in Taiwan. The habitat consists of mid-elevation mountain areas (altitudes ranging from 950 to 2,223 meters) with primary vegetation.

The wingspan is 24–25 mm. The forewing ground colour is chestnut with an ochreous stripe and one median longitudinal green patch delimited by white lines and a subsequent wide brown border. The hindwings are chestnut. The anal margin and marginal scales are ochreous. Adults have been recorded on wing from late May to late June, in mid- and late July and from mid-August to mid-September, possibly in two generations per year.
