= Casphalia elegans =

Scientific classification
- Kingdom: Animalia
- Phylum: Arthropoda
- Class: Insecta
- Order: Lepidoptera
- Family: Limacodidae
- Genus: Casphalia
- Species: C. elegans

Binomial name
- Casphalia elegans Jordan, 1915

Species of moth

Casphalia elegans is a moth species in the genus Casphalia found in Ghana.
