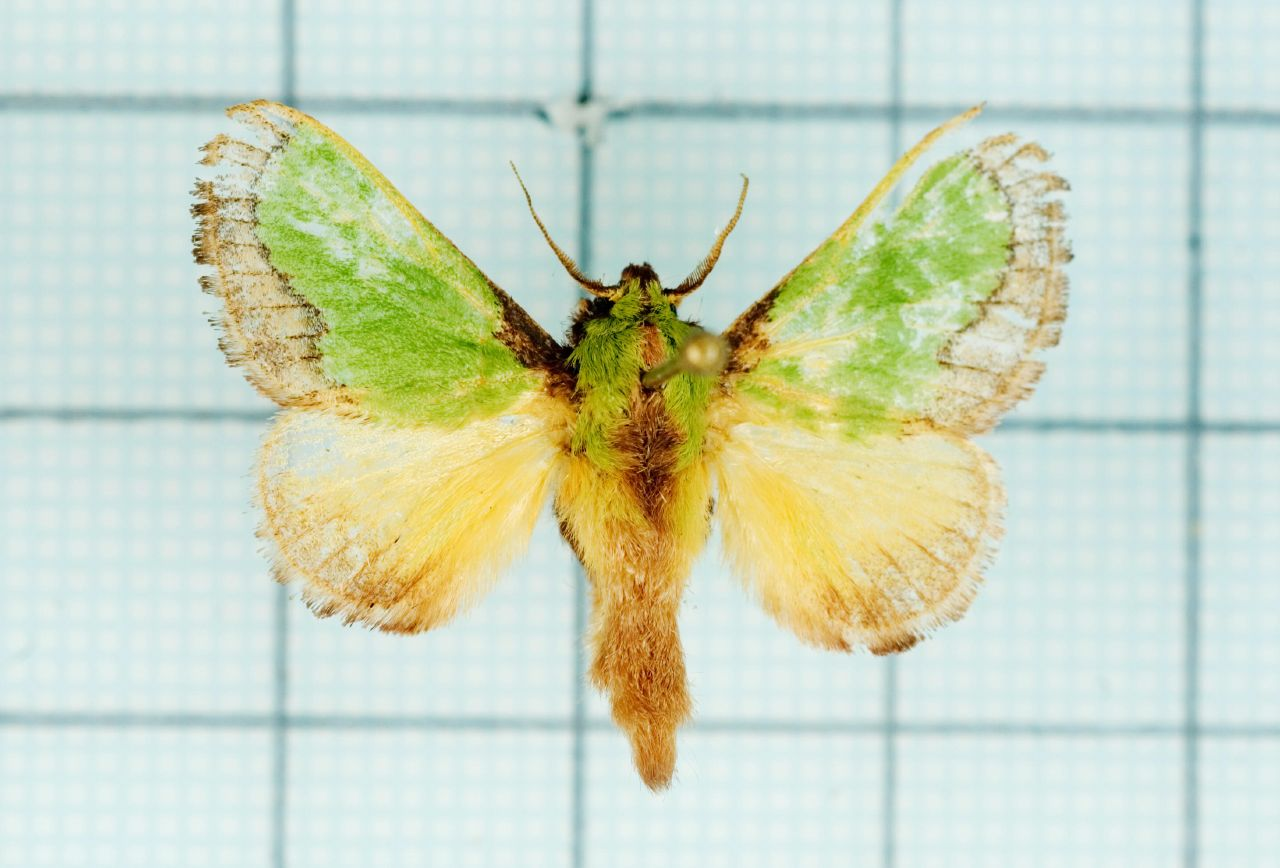

Scientific classification
- Domain: Eukaryota
- Kingdom: Animalia
- Phylum: Arthropoda
- Class: Insecta
- Order: Lepidoptera
- Family: Limacodidae
- Genus: Parasa
- Species: P. shirakii

Binomial name
- Parasa shirakii Kawada, 1930

= Parasa shirakii =

Species of moth

Parasa shirakii is a moth of the family Limacodidae. It is found in Taiwan.

The wingspan is 27–34 mm.
