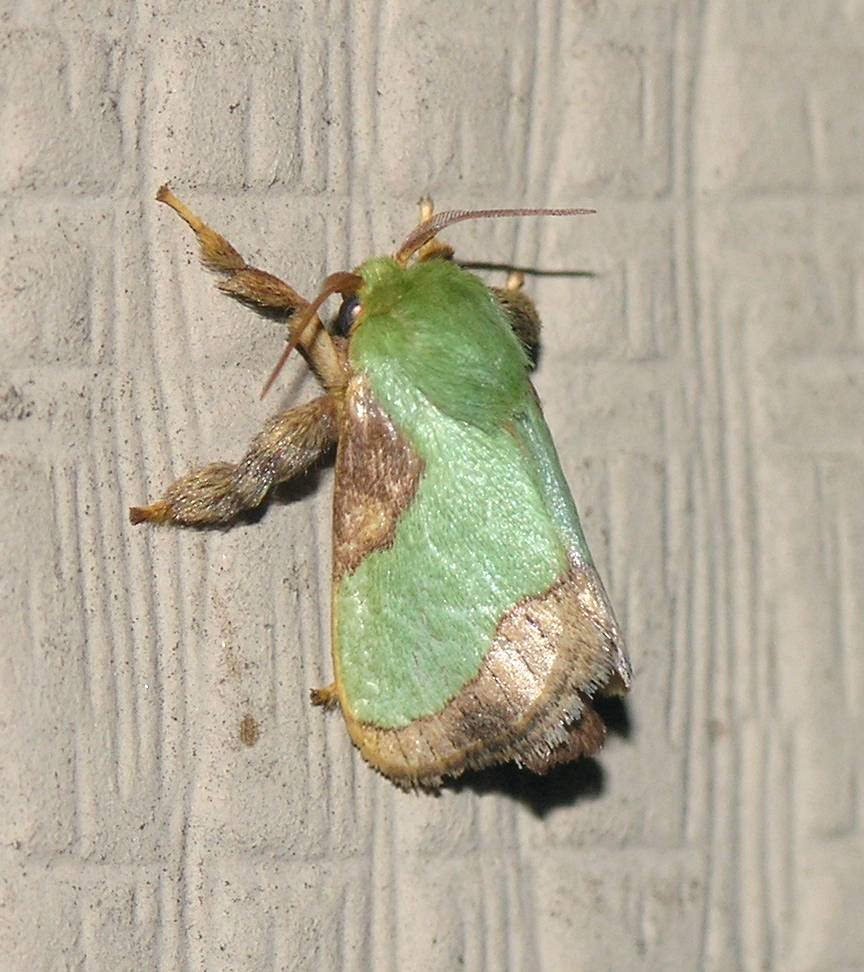

Scientific classification
- Kingdom: Animalia
- Phylum: Arthropoda
- Clade: Pancrustacea
- Class: Insecta
- Order: Lepidoptera
- Family: Limacodidae
- Genus: Parasa
- Species: P. indetermina

Binomial name
- Parasa indetermina (Boisduval, 1832)

Synonyms
- Latoia indetermina (Boisduval, 1832); Latoia vernata Packard, 1864

= Parasa indetermina =

Species of moth

Parasa indetermina, the stinging rose moth, is a moth of the family Limacodidae. It is found in the United States from New York to Florida, west to Missouri, Texas, and Oklahoma.

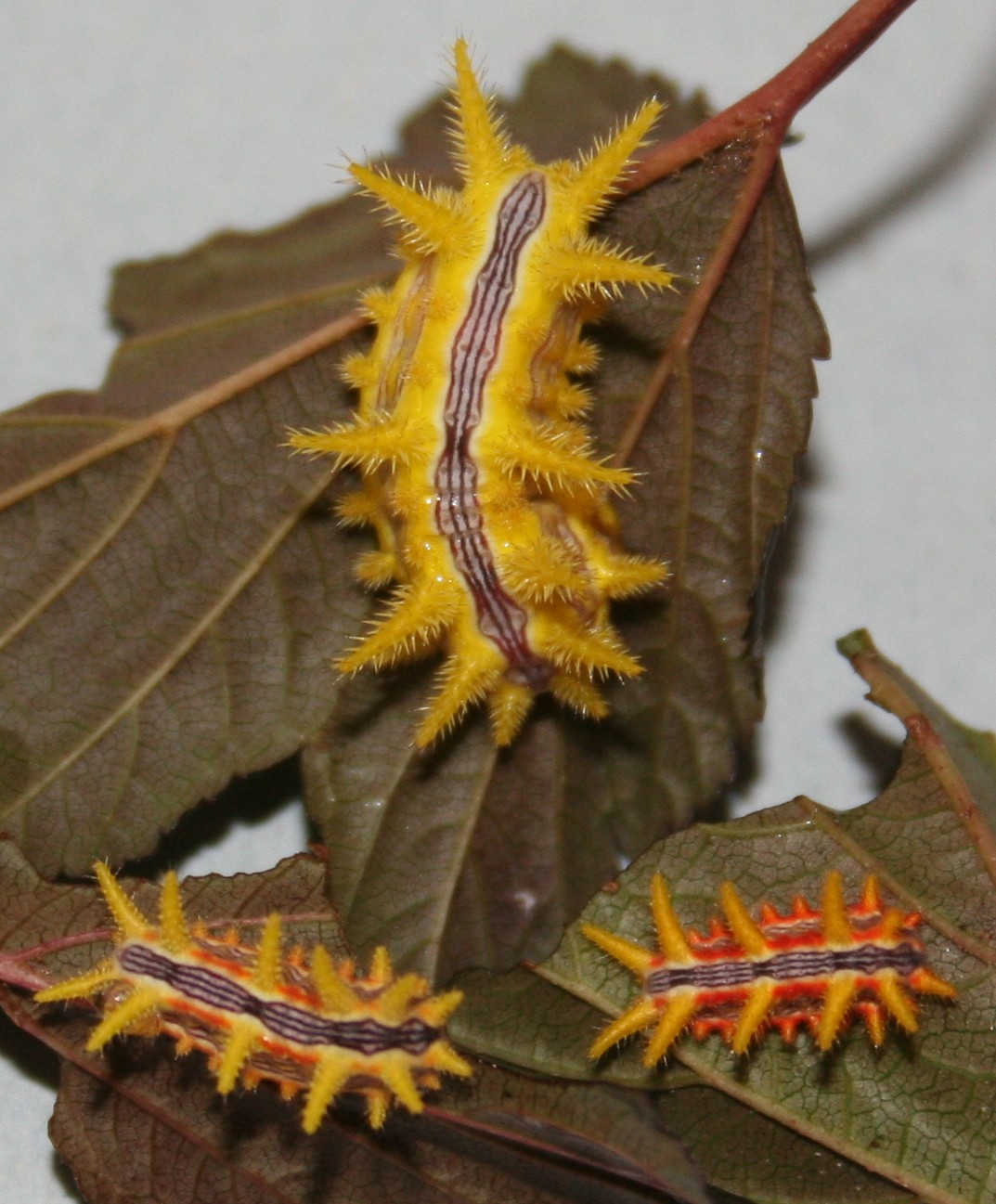
Caterpillars

The wingspan is 23–30 mm. Adults are on wing from June to July.

The larvae feed on apple, dogwood, hickory, maple, oak, poplar, and rose bushes. and possess numerous urticating hairs, from which they derive their common name.
