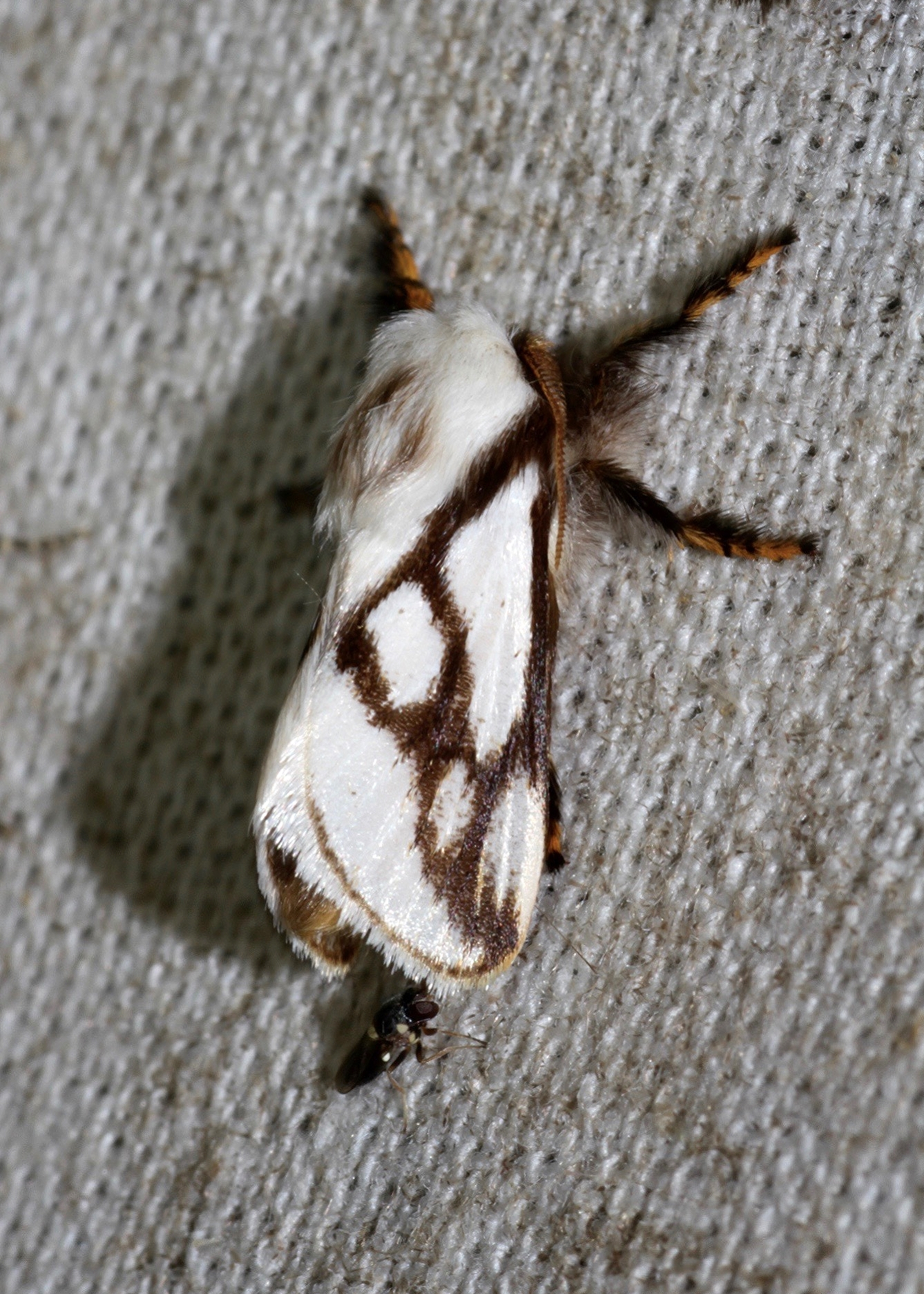

Scientific classification
- Kingdom: Animalia
- Phylum: Arthropoda
- Class: Insecta
- Order: Lepidoptera
- Family: Limacodidae
- Genus: Parapluda
- Species: P. invitabilis

Binomial name
- Parapluda invitabilis Wallengren, 1860

= Parapluda invitabilis =

Species of moth

Parapluda invitabilis is a species of moth in the family Limacodidae and in the subfamily Limacodinae.

== Distribution ==
Parapluda invitabilis occurs in Botswana, DR Congo, Djibouti, Ethiopia, Gabon, Malawi, Mozambique, South Africa, Tanzania, Uganda, Zambia and Zimbabwe.
