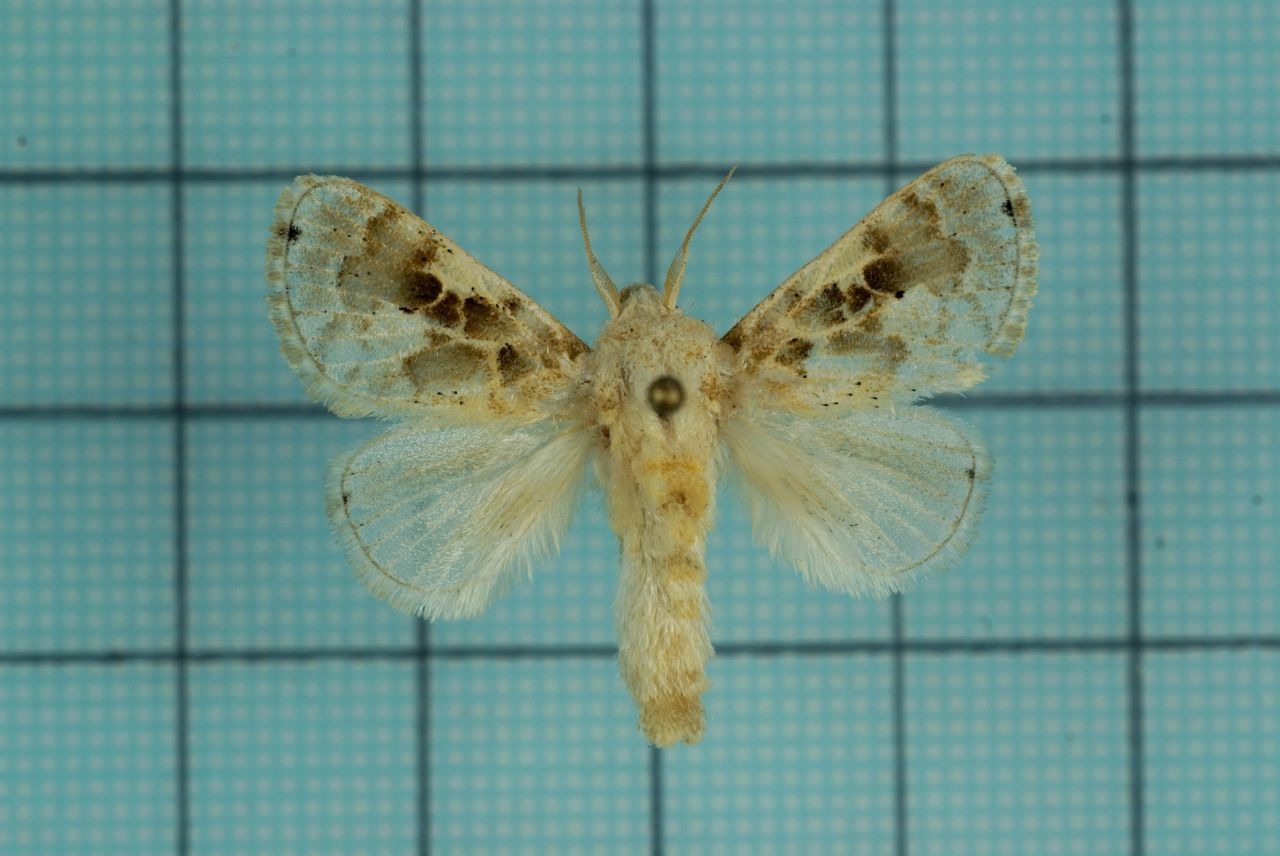
- Altha lacteola melanopsis

Scientific classification
- Kingdom: Animalia
- Phylum: Arthropoda
- Class: Insecta
- Order: Lepidoptera
- Family: Limacodidae
- Genus: Altha
- Species: A. lacteola

Binomial name
- Altha lacteola (C. Swinhoe, 1890)

Synonyms
- Belgoraea lacteola C. Swinhoe, 1890

= Altha lacteola =

Species of moth

Altha lacteola is a moth of the family Limacodidae first described by Charles Swinhoe in 1890. It is found in south-east Asia, including Vietnam and Taiwan.

The wingspan is 25–30 mm. Adults are on wing in September.

== Subspecies ==
- Altha lacteola lacteola
- Altha lacteola melanopsis Strand, 1915 (Taiwan)
