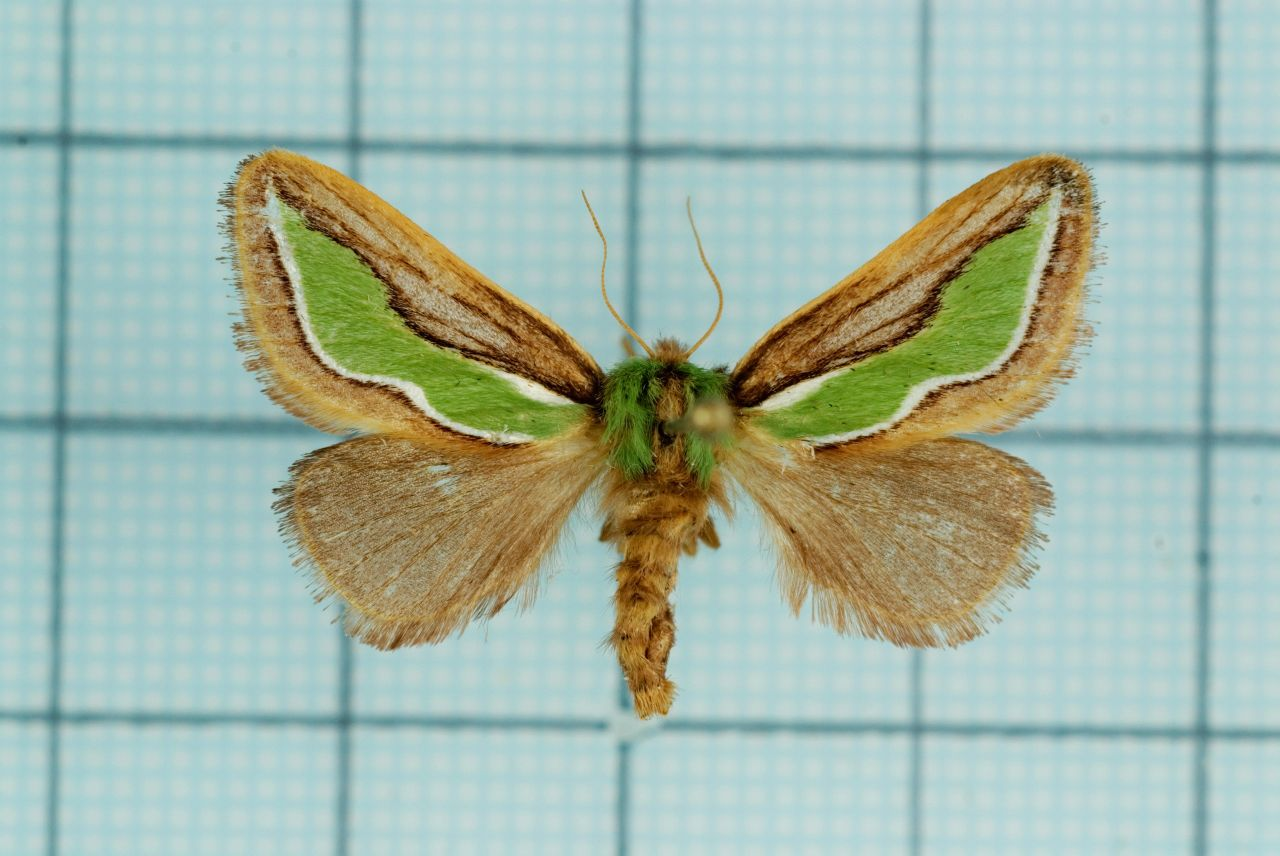
- Parasa darma

Scientific classification
- Domain: Eukaryota
- Kingdom: Animalia
- Phylum: Arthropoda
- Class: Insecta
- Order: Lepidoptera
- Family: Limacodidae
- Subfamily: Limacodinae
- Genus: Parasa; Moore, [1860]

Synonyms
- Neaera Herrich-Schäffer, [1854]; Neaerasa Staudinger, 1892; Callochlora Packard, 1864

= Parasa =

Genus of moths

Parasa is a genus of moths of the family Limacodidae. It was described by Frederic Moore in 1860.

== Description ==
Palpi projecting beyond frontal tuft. Forewings are rounded at apex. Veins 7, 8, and 9 stalked. Veinlet in cell forked or the lower discocellular absent. The fork of the veinlet replacing it. Hindwing with veins 6 and 7 on a short stalk or from cell. Hind tibia with a terminal pair of spurs.

== Species ==
- albipuncta species group
  - Parasa albipuncta Hampson, 1893
  - Parasa hampsoni Dyar, 1894
  - Parasa zhudiana (Cai, 1983)
- argentifascia species group
  - Parasa argentifascia (R.Q. Cai, 1983)
  - Parasa eupuncta (R.Q. Cai, 1983)
  - Parasa liangdiana (R.Q. Cai, 1983)
  - Parasa mutifascia (R.Q. Cai, 1983)
  - Parasa parapuncta (R.Q. Cai, 1983)
- argentilinea species group
  - Parasa argentilinea Hampson, 1893
- bicolor species group
  - Parasa albida Candèze, 1927
  - Parasa argyroneura Hering, 1931
  - Parasa bicolor (Walker, 1855)
  - Parasa feina (Cai, 1983)
  - Parasa flavabdomena (Cai, 1983)
  - Parasa foliola Solovyev & Witt, 2009
  - Parasa hainana (Cai, 1983)
  - Parasa jade Solovyev & Witt, 2009
  - Parasa jiana (Cai, 1983)
  - Parasa mina (R.Q. Cai, 1983)
  - Parasa pseudobicolor Holloway, 1990
  - Parasa umbra Solovyev & Witt, 2009
  - Parasa virescens (Matsumura, 1911)
  - Parasa yana (Cai, 1983)
- bimaculata species group
  - Parasa anchutka Solovyev, 2011
  - Parasa balitkae Holloway, 1987
  - Parasa bimaculata (Snellen, 1897)
  - Parasa brillians Holloway, 1987
  - Parasa chlorostigma (Snellen, 1879)
  - Parasa fidea Solovyev, 2011
  - Parasa semperi Holloway, 1987
- consocia species group
  - Parasa consocia Walker, 1865
  - Parasa humeralis Walker, 1862
  - Parasa lorquini (Reakirt, 1864)
  - Parasa neopastoralis Rose, 2004
  - Parasa pastoralis Butler, 1885
  - Parasa stekolnikovi Solovyev & Witt, 2009
  - Parasa zulona Reakirt, 1864
- darma species group
  - Parasa darma Moore, 1859
  - Parasa darmoides Holloway, 1982
- herbifera species group
  - Parasa bana (Cai, 1983)
  - Parasa barbatanellus Holloway, 1990
  - Parasa canangae Hering, 1931
  - Parasa canangoides Holloway, 1986
  - Parasa herbifera (Walker, 1855)
  - Parasa melli Hering, 1931
  - Parasa mustacha Holloway, 1990
- jina species group
  - Parasa atera Solovyev & Witt, 2009
  - Parasa jina (R.Q. Cai, 1983)
- lepida species group
  - Parasa actiacus Solovyev, 2011
  - Parasa corbetti Holloway, 1987
  - Parasa emeralda Solovyev & Witt, 2009
  - Parasa himalepida Holloway, 1987
  - Parasa julikatis Solovyev & Witt, 2009
  - Parasa lepida (Cramer, 1779)
  - Parasa media (Walker, 1855)
  - Parasa philepida Holloway, 1987
  - Parasa shirakii Kawada, 1930
  - Parasa sundalepida Holloway, 1986
- ostia species group
  - Parasa altilis Solovyev & Witt, 2009
  - Parasa ostia Swinhoe, 1902
  - Parasa prasina Alphéraky, 1895
  - Parasa shaanxiensis (Cai, 1983)
  - Parasa vadimi Solovyev & Witt, 2009
- repanda species group
  - Parasa campagnei de Joannis, 1928
  - Parasa repanda (Walker, 1855)
  - Parasa pseudorepanda Hering, 1933
- undulata species group
  - Parasa minwangi Wu & Chang, 2013
  - Parasa viridiflamma Wu & Chang, 2013
  - Parasa martini Solovyev, 2011
  - Parasa pygmy Solovyev, 2011
  - Parasa undulata (R.Q. Cai, 1983)
- xueshana species group
  - Parasa badia Solovyev & Witt, 2009
  - Parasa dilucida Solovyev & Witt, 2009
  - Parasa xueshana (R.Q. Cai, 1983)
- unknown species group
  - Parasa campylostagma Dognin, 1914
  - Parasa chloris (Herrich-Schäffer, [1854])
  - Parasa dusii Solovyev & Saldaitis, 2010
  - Parasa euchlora Karsch, 1896
  - Parasa figueresi Corrales & Epstein, 2004
  - Parasa hilarula (Staudinger, 1887)
  - Parasa imitata Druce, 1887
  - Parasa indetermina (Boisduval, 1832)
  - Parasa joanae Epstein, 2004
  - Parasa laonome Druce, 1887
  - Parasa laranda Druce, 1887
  - Parasa prussi Karsch, 1896
  - Parasa sandrae Corrales & Epstein, 2004
  - Parasa shirleyae Corrales & Epstein, 2004
  - Parasa sinica Moore, 1877
  - Parasa solovyevi C.S. Wu, 2011
