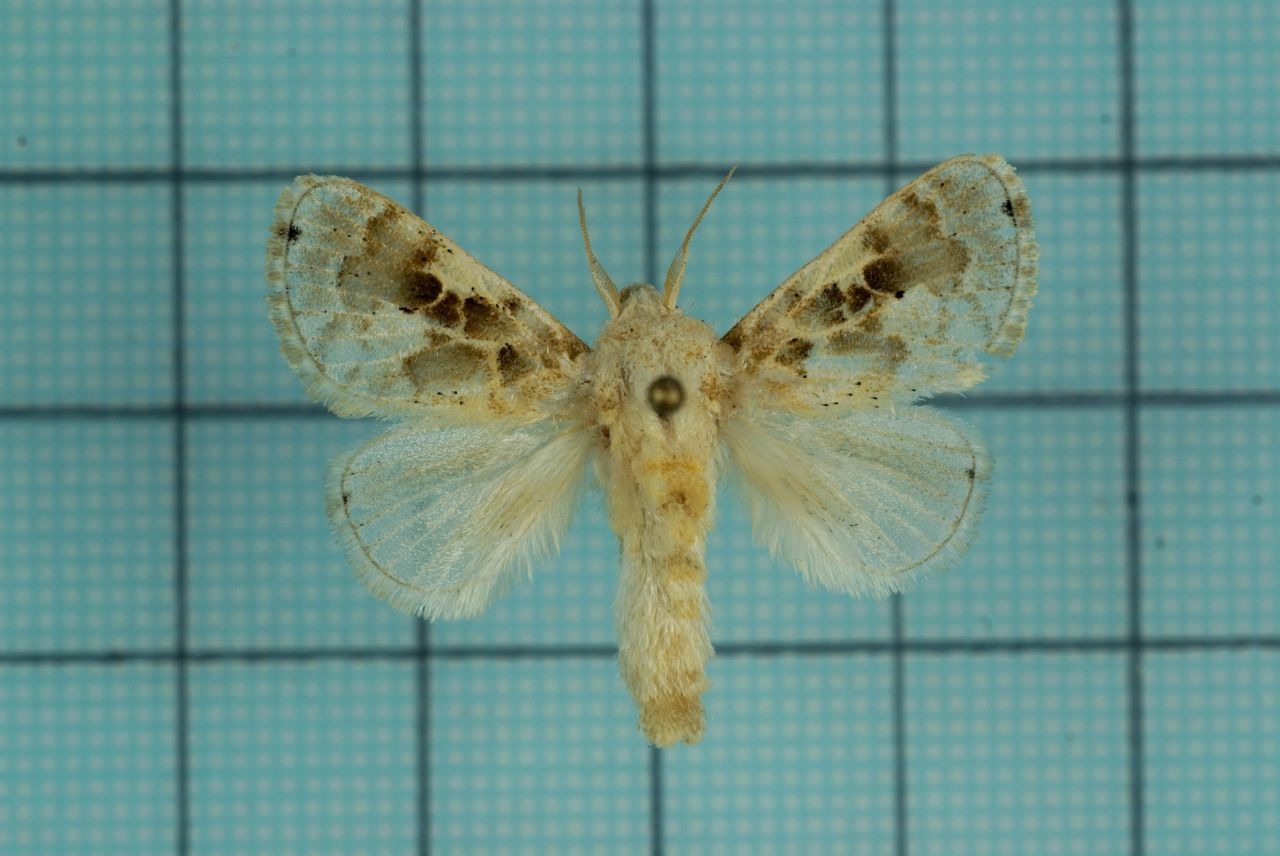
- Altha lacteola

Scientific classification
- Kingdom: Animalia
- Phylum: Arthropoda
- Class: Insecta
- Order: Lepidoptera
- Family: Limacodidae
- Subfamily: Limacodinae
- Genus: Altha; Walker, 1862

Type species
- Altha nivea Walker, 1862

Synonyms
- Belgoraea

= Altha (moth) =

Genus of moths

Altha is a genus of moths of the family Limacodidae first described by Francis Walker in 1862.

== Description ==
Palpi short and slight. Mid and hind tibia lack spurs. Forewings with vein 7 from the cell or stalked with veins 8 and 9. Hindwing with vein 6 and 7 from the cell.

== Species ==
Some species of this genus are:

- Altha adala Moore, 1859
- Altha alastor Tams, 1930 (from Sulawesi)
- Altha ansorgei Bethune-Baker, 1911 (from Angola and Nigeria)
- Altha basalis West, 1940 (from Congo and Tanzania)
- Altha circumscripta Hering 1931
- Altha contaminata Hampson, 1892
- Altha lacides Hampson, 1910 (from Zambia)
- Altha lacteola (Swinhoe, 1890) (from Taiwan and Vietnam)
- Altha nivea Walker, 1862 (from India to Sundaland/Borneo)
- Altha nix Solovyev & Witt, 2009 (from Laos, Thailand and Vietnam)
- Altha nuristana Daniel 1865
- Altha peralbida Swinhoe, 1904(from India)
- Altha pura (from Indonesia)
- Altha rufescens Swinhoe
- Altha rubrifusalis Hampson, 1910 (from Ghana, Nigeria and Sierra Leone)
- Altha subnotata Walker, 1865(from India, Sri Lanka)
