= Altha Lake =

Lake in the state of California, United States

- Location within California
- Location: Madera County, California
- Coordinates: 37°42′45″N 119°08′43″W
- Type: Lake
- Surface elevation: 9,714 feet (2,961 m)

Altha Lake is a lake in the Sierra Nevada in eastern Madera County, California.

It is within the boundaries of the Ansel Adams Wilderness, and in the Sierra National Forest.

History

Altha Lake was likely named for Altha Branson Summers, the wife of a local hotel owner.

== See also ==
- List of lakes in California
