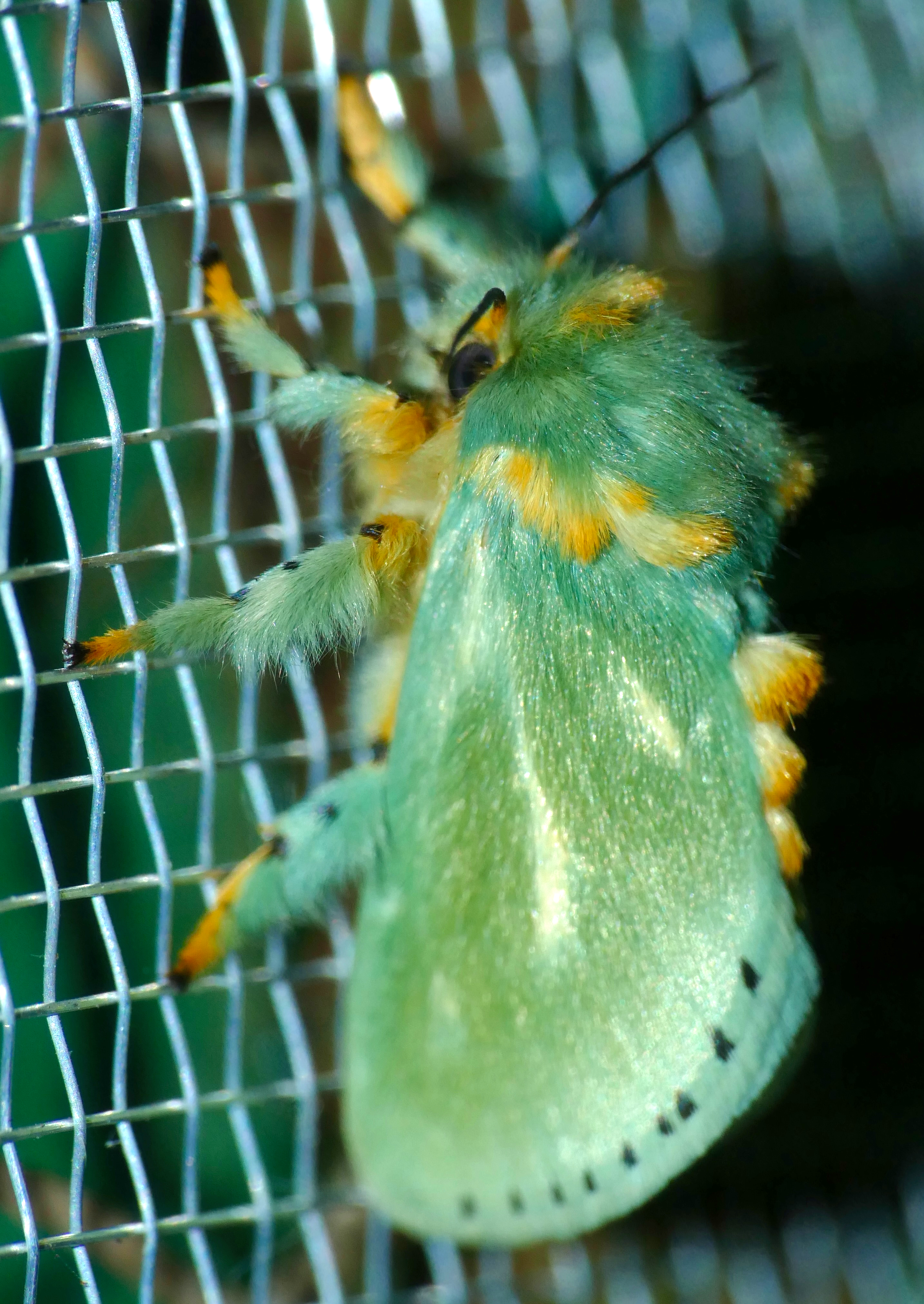
- Coenobasis amoena

Scientific classification
- Kingdom: Animalia
- Phylum: Arthropoda
- Class: Insecta
- Order: Lepidoptera
- Family: Limacodidae
- Genus: Coenobasis; Felder, 1874

= Coenobasis =

Genus of insects

Coenobasis is a genus of slug moths described by Rudolf Felder in 1874.

== List of species ==
- Coenobasis albiramosa Walker, 1865
- Coenobasis amoena Felder, 1874
- Coenobasis argentilinea Aurivillius, 1899
- Coenobasis chloronoton Hampson, 1916
- Coenobasis farouki Wiltshire, 1947
- Coenobasis hemichlora Grünberg, 1910
- Coenobasis intermedia Janse, 1964
- Coenobasis panochra Janse, 1964
- Coenobasis postflavida Hampson, 1910
- Coenobasis turnina West, 1937
