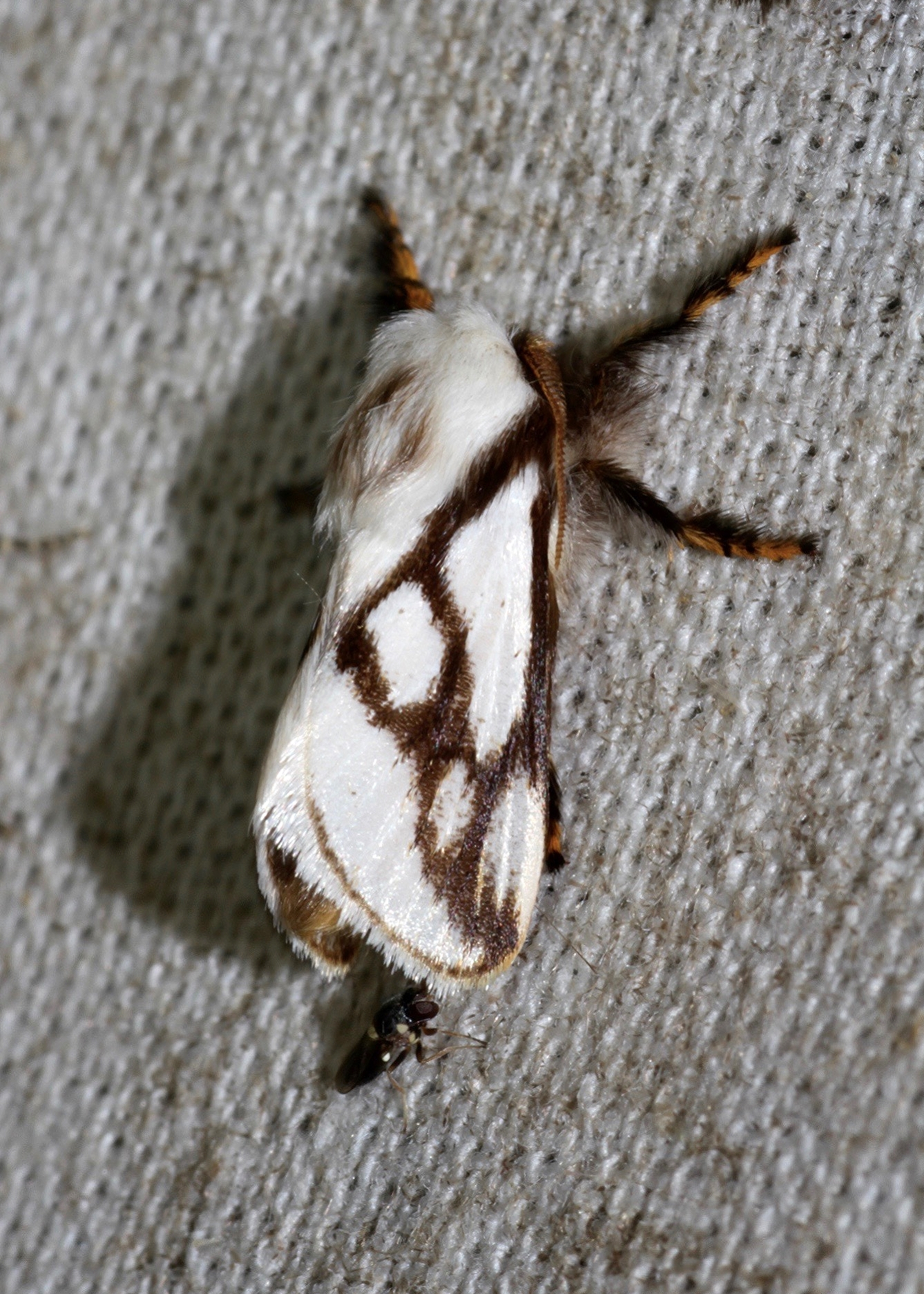
- Parapluda invitabilis

Scientific classification
- Kingdom: Animalia
- Phylum: Arthropoda
- Clade: Pancrustacea
- Class: Insecta
- Order: Lepidoptera
- Family: Limacodidae
- Subfamily: Limacodinae

Tribes
- Eucleini; Limacodini

= Limacodinae =

Subfamily of moths

Limacodinae is a subfamily of moths in the family Limacodidae.

== Selected genera ==
- Afraltha
- Afrobirthama
- Afroplax
- Altha
- Apluda
- Astatophlebia
- Baria
- Birthama
- Brachia
- Brachypecta
- Caffricola
- Casphalia
- Chrysamma
- Coenobasis
- Cosuma
- Crothaema
